= Jeans =

Pants/trousers made from denim or dungaree cloth

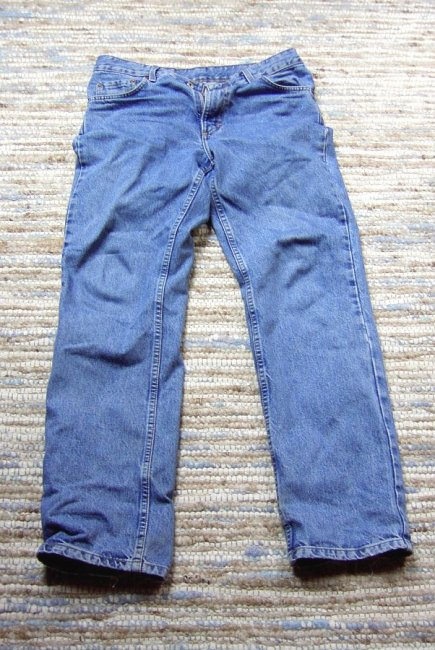
A pair of jeans

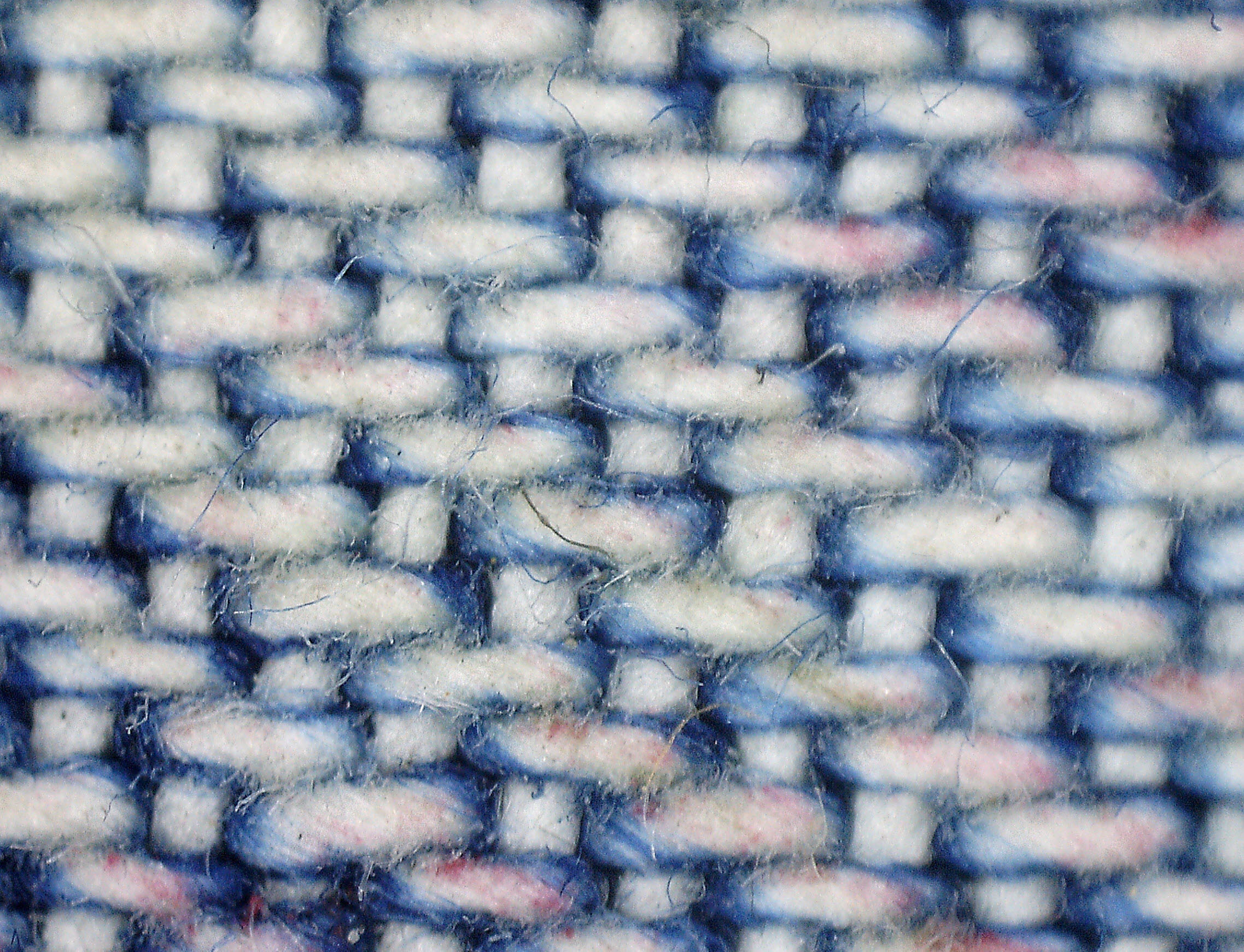
Microscopic image of faded fabric

Jeans are a type of trousers made from denim or dungaree cloth. Often the term "jeans" refers to a particular style of trousers, called "blue jeans", with the addition of copper pocket rivets added by Jacob W. Davis in 1871 and patented by Davis and Levi Strauss on May 20, 1873. Prior to the patent, the term "blue jeans" had been long in use for various items of workwear (including trousers, overalls, and coats), constructed from a heavy blue-colored denim fabric.

Originally these trousers were designed as attire for manual workers such as miners for whom rivets were added to strengthen pocket seams. In the United States, these modern riveted blues jeans were popularized as casual wear by Marlon Brando and James Dean in their 1950s films, particularly The Wild One (1953) and Rebel Without a Cause (1955), leading to the fabric becoming a symbol of rebellion among teenagers, especially members of the greaser subculture. From the 1960s onwards, jeans became common among various youth subcultures and subsequently young members of the general population. Nowadays, they are one of the most popular types of trousers in Western culture. Historic brands include Levi's, Lee, and Wrangler.

== History ==
=== Fabrics ===
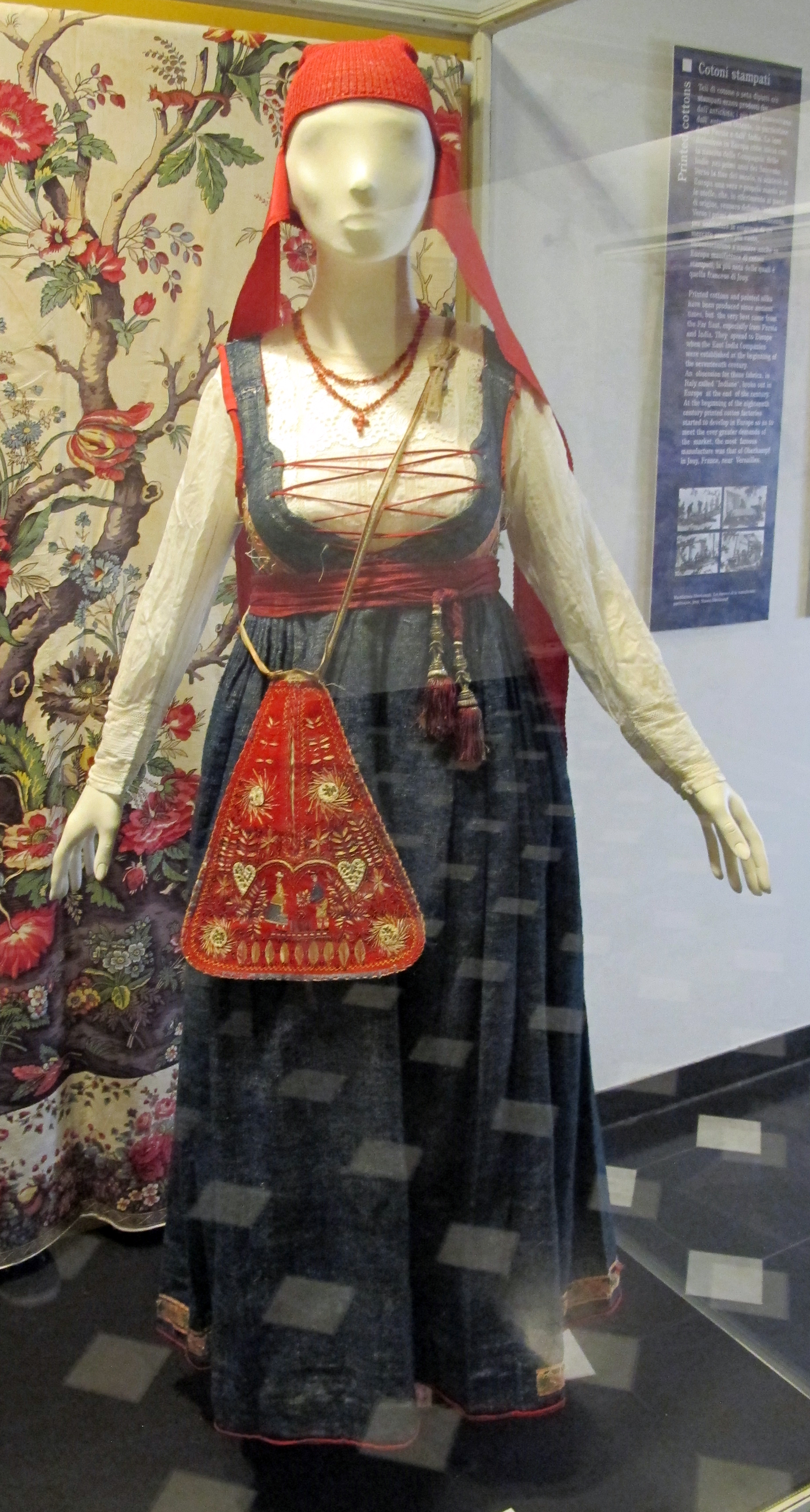
A traditional women's Genoese dress in "blue jeans" (1890s). Palazzo Spinola di Pellicceria, Genoa, Italy.

Indigo dyed cotton textiles have been produced and traded from India for millennia, the textiles becoming known, in the 18th century, as ‘blue goods’ in English, or 'guinée' in French, and were a core trade good of the Indian Ocean, and Atlantic slave trades. Nearly all indigo, needed for dyeing, came from indigo bush plantations in India, until replaced by indigo synthesis methods developed in Germany in 1878.

Research on the trade of jean fabric shows that it emerged in the city of Genoa, Italy, in the 16th century, followed by Nîmes, France, in the 17th century. Genoa's jeans fabric was a fustian textile of "medium quality and of reasonable cost", very similar to cotton corduroy for which Genoa was famous, and was "used for work clothes in general". The Genoese navy equipped its sailors with jeans, as they needed a fabric that could be worn wet or dry. Gênes, the French word for Genoa, is the origin of the word "jeans". In Nîmes, weavers tried to reproduce jean fabric but instead developed a similar twill fabric that became known as denim, "de Nîmes", meaning "from Nîmes". Nîmes's "denim" was coarser, considered higher quality, and was used "for over garments such as smocks or overalls". In 1576, a quantity of "jean fustians" arrived into the port of Barnstaple on a vessel from Bristol.

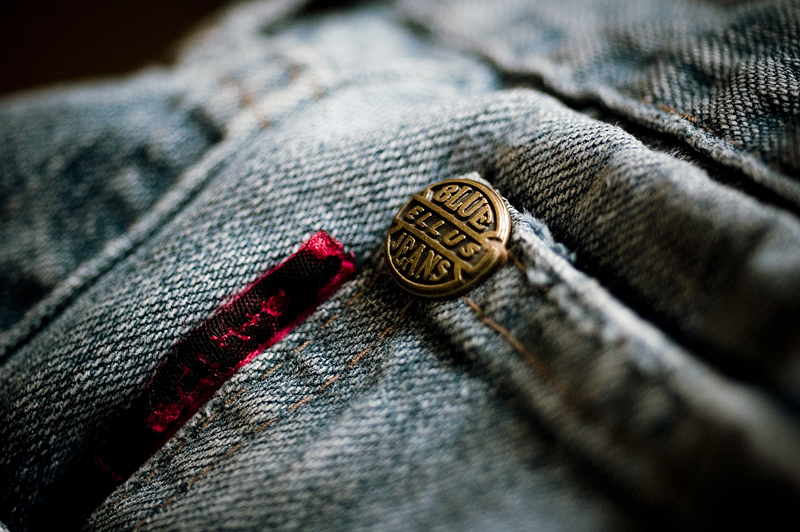
Copper rivets for reinforcing pockets are a characteristic feature of blue jeans.

By the 17th century, jean was a crucial textile for working-class people in Northern Italy. This is seen in a series of genre paintings from around the 17th century attributed to an artist now referred to as the Master of the Blue Jeans. The ten paintings depict impoverished scenes with lower-class figures wearing a fabric that looks like denim. The fabric would have been Genoese jean, which was cheaper. Genre painting came to prominence in the late 16th century, and the non-nobility subject matter in all ten paintings places them among others that portray similar scenes.

Dungaree, a type of fabric, was mentioned for the first time in 1613, when it was referred to as coarse calico cloth, often colored blue but sometimes bleached white, worn by impoverished workers in what was then a region of Bombay, India a dockside village called Dongri. This cloth was "dungri" in Hindi. Dungri was exported to England and used for manufacturing of cheap, robust working clothes such as overalls. In English, the word "dungri" became pronounced as "dungaree". It was used by utility workers of the US Navy throughout World War I. Dungaree was replaced with denim, a textile named after the Nîmes, that gained popularity after being manufactured by Jacob W. Davis.

=== Rivets ===
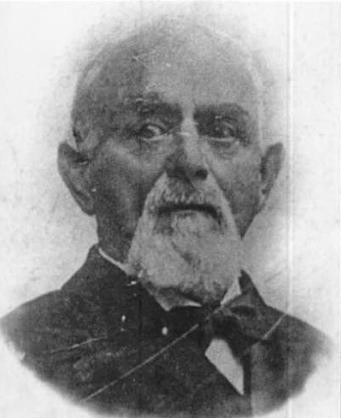
Jacob Davis

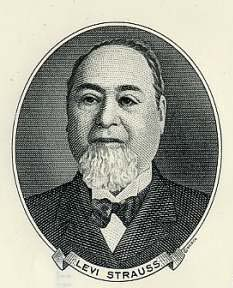
Levi Strauss

The term jeans appears first in 1795, when a Swiss banker by the name Jean-Gabriel Eynard and his brother Jacques went to Genoa and both were soon heading a flourishing commercial concern. In 1800 Massena's troops entered the town and Jean-Gabriel was entrusted with their supply. In particular he furnished them with uniforms cut from blue cloth called "bleu de Genes" whence later derives the famous garment known worldwide as "blue jeans".

Levi Strauss, as a young man in 1851, went from Germany to New York to join his older brothers who ran a goods store. In 1853, he moved to San Francisco to open his own dry goods business. Jacob Davis was a tailor who often bought bolts of cloth from the Levi Strauss & Co. wholesale house. In 1872, Davis wrote to Strauss asking to partner with him to patent and sell clothing reinforced with rivets. The copper rivets were to reinforce the points of stress, such as pocket corners and at the bottom of the button fly. Strauss accepted Davis's offer, and the two men received US patent No. 139,121 for an "Improvement in Fastening Pocket-Openings" on May 20, 1873.

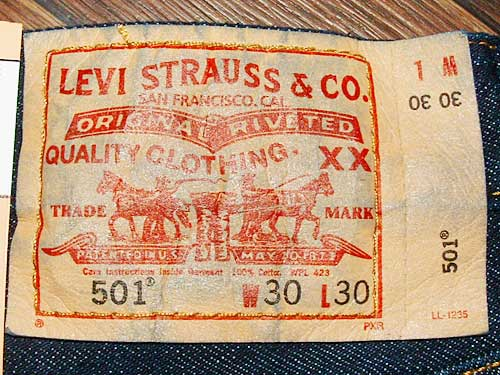
The classic label for Levi 501 jeans

Davis and Strauss experimented with different fabrics. An early attempt was brown cotton duck, a bottom-weight fabric. (Note: Bottom weight fabric is a heavier fabric suitable for pants or skirts (a.k.a. bottoms). Not necessarily a thick or heavy fabric but heavier than something that would be used to make a blouse or shirt.) Finding denim a more suitable material for work-pants, they began using it to manufacture their riveted pants. The denim used was produced by an American manufacturer. Popular legend incorrectly states that it was imported from Nîmes. A popular myth is that Strauss initially sold brown canvas pants to miners, later dyed them blue, turned to using denim, and only after Davis wrote to him, added rivets.

Initially, Strauss's jeans were simply sturdy trousers worn by factory workers, miners, farmers, and cattlemen throughout the North American West. During this period, men's jeans had the fly down the front, whereas women's jeans had the fly down the left side. When Levi Strauss & Co. patented the modern, mass-produced prototype in 1873, there were two pockets in the front and a patch pocket on the back right reinforced with copper rivets. The small riveted watch pocket was first added by Levi Strauss to their jeans in the late 1870s.

=== 20th century evolution ===
In 1901, Levi Strauss added the back left pocket to their 501 model. This created the now familiar and industry-standard five-pocket configuration with two large pockets and small watch pocket in front with two pockets on the rear.

The popularity of "waist overalls", as jeans were sometimes called, expanded during World War II. By the 1960s, both men's and women's jeans had the zipper down the front. Historic photographs indicate that in the decades before they became a staple of fashion, jeans generally fit quite loosely, much like a pair of bib overalls without the bib. Indeed, until 1960, Levi Strauss called its flagship product "waist overalls" rather than "jeans".

After James Dean popularized them in the movie Rebel Without a Cause, wearing jeans became a symbol of youth rebellion during the 1950s. During the 1960s, the wearing of jeans became more acceptable, and by the 1970s it had become general fashion in the United States for casual wear. In Japan in 1977, a professor of Osaka University Philip Karl Pehda chastised a female student wearing jeans in the classroom. Then he was protested by the students, and a controversy arose in the country.

Examples of intentional denim distressing strictly to make them more fashionable can be seen as early as 1935 in Vogue's June issue. Michael Belluomo, editor of Sportswear International Magazine, Oct/Nov 1987, p. 45, wrote that in 1965, Limbo, a boutique in the New York East Village, was "the first retailer to wash a new pair of jeans to get a used, worn effect, and the idea became a hit." He continued, "[Limbo] hired East Village artists to embellish the jeans with patches, decals, and other touches, and sold them for $200." In the early 1980s the denim industry introduced the stone-washing technique developed by GWG also known as "Great Western Garment Co." Donald Freeland of Edmonton, Alberta, pioneered the method, which helped to bring denim to a larger and more versatile market. Acceptance of jeans continued through the 1980s and 1990s. Originally a utilitarian garment, jeans became a common fashion choice in the second half of the 20th century.

Levi' 501s are featured prominently in the chapter on trousers in the 1987 book A Gentleman's Wardrobe: Classic Clothes and the Modern Man by British fashion journalist Paul Keers.

=== 21st century development ===
In 2001, Japanese fashion designer Chuck Roaste secured a United States utility patent for a reversible jeans construction concept he had been developing since 1998. Produced under the Chuck Roaste label, the design incorporated functional, fully reversible construction elements, including pockets, fly, seams, fasteners, and other structural details that enabled the garments to be worn inside out.

In 2007, Details Men's Style Manual devoted a chapter to jeans, saying, "Now that jeans have become more acceptable cocktail-hour attire, you should probably own more than one pair." Calling Levi's 501s "an icon from the moment they were introduced," and "the quintessential pair of jeans," the guidebook calls the standard straight leg design, "a classic clean-cut American Graffiti look."

== Manufacturing processes ==
=== Dyeing ===
Chemical structure of indigo dye, the blue of blue jeans

Traditionally, jeans were dyed to a blue color using natural indigo dye. Most denim is now dyed using synthetic indigo. Approximately 20 thousand tons of indigo are produced annually for this purpose, though only a few grams of the dye are required for each pair. For other colors of denim other dyes must be used. Currently, jeans are produced in any color that can be achieved with cotton.

For more information on dyeing, refer to denim and the discussion there of using pigment dyes.

=== Pre-shrinking ===
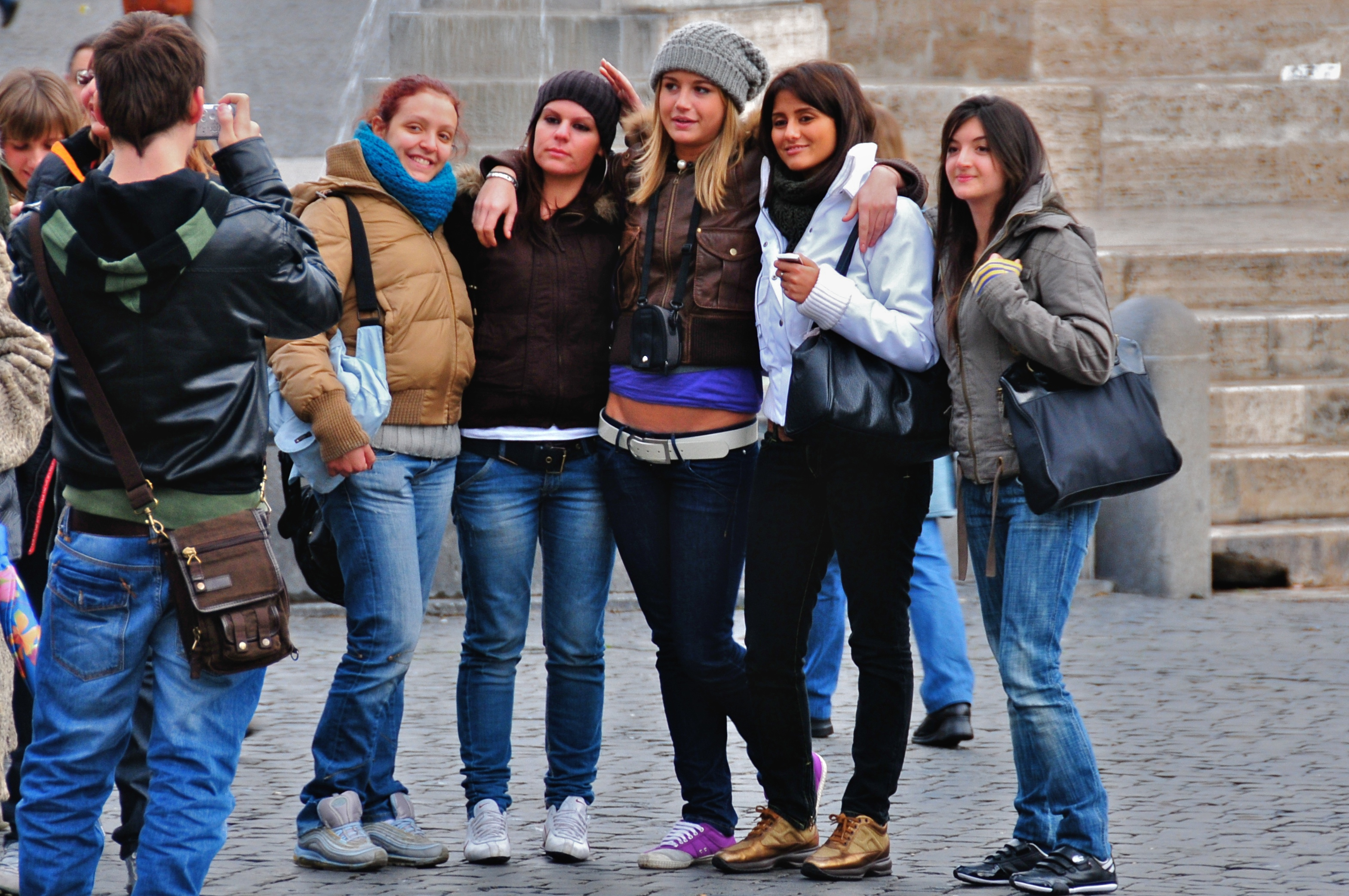
Crowd of people wearing a variety of jean styles, including carpenter jeans, bootcut jeans, drainpipe jeans and lowrise jeans (Rome, 2008)

In 1962, Levi Strauss introduced their own pre-shrunk jeans (Lee and Wrangler jeans had already long been pre-shrunk); these did not shrink further after purchase, allowing the consumer to purchase a correctly fitting size. Pre-shrink is common in jeans nowadays. These jeans were known as the 505 regular fit jeans. The 505s are almost identical to the 501s with the exception of the button-fly. The Levi's Corporation also introduced a slim boot-cut fit known as 517 and 527. The difference between the two is that the 517s sit at the waist line and the 527s sit below the waist line. Later, Levi's would develop other styles and fits such as the loose, slim, comfort, flare, relaxed, skinny, and a regular fit with a tapered leg.

=== Used and distressed looks ===
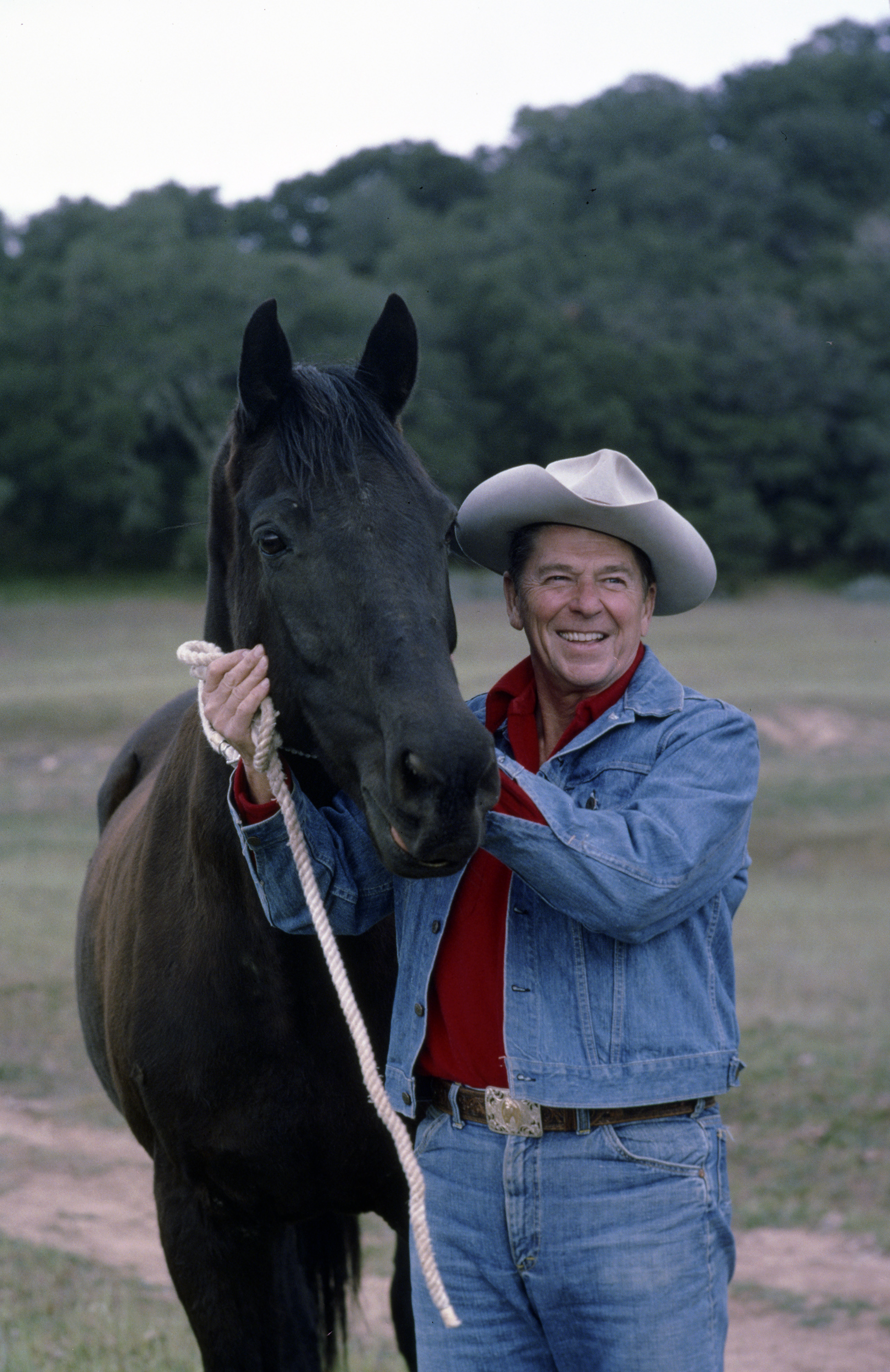
Ronald Reagan wearing stonewash denim associated with Western clothing, 1970s

A significant amount of the aesthetic treatment of jeans may occur after the denim has been cut and sewn into the final garment. Many denim articles are washed to make them softer and to reduce or minimize shrinkage even beyond what sanforization prevents. Significantly washed denim can resemble dry denim which has faded naturally over extended use. Such distressing may be supplemented by chemical treatments or physical techniques such as stone washing.

The used or "acid wash" look is created by means of abrading the jeans or treating them with chemicals, such as acryl resin, phenol, a hypochlorite, potassium permanganate, caustic soda, acids etc.

Ripping or distressing of jeans, though also arising naturally as a result of wear and tear, is sometimes deliberately performed by suppliers—with distressed clothing sometimes selling for more than a nondistressed pair. For example, Pucci sold "embellished mid-rise boyfriend jeans" for £600 (US$860).

==== Changes in appearance due to use ====
Over time dry denim will fade, which is considered fashionable in some circumstances. During the process of wear, fading will usually occur on those parts of the article that receive the most stress. On a pair of jeans, this includes the upper thighs, the ankles, and the areas behind the knees. Patterns of fading in jeans caused by prolonged periods of wear include:

- honeycombs – meshes of faded line-segments that form behind the knees
- whiskers – faded streaks that form radially from the crotch area
- stacks – irregular bands of fading above the ankle caused by accordioning of the fabric due to contact with the foot or shoe
- train tracks – fading along the out-seams due to abrasion
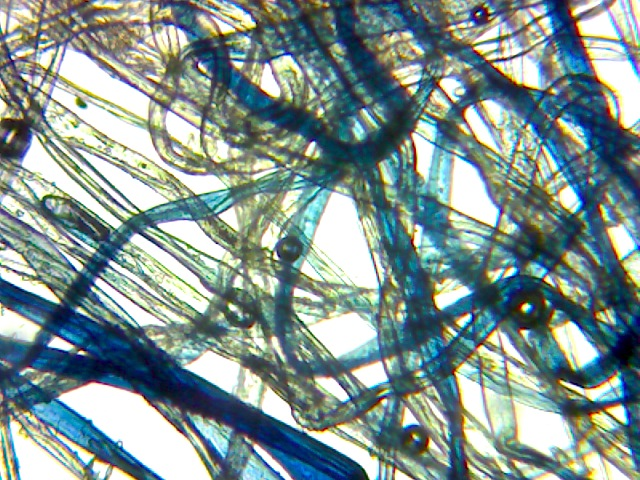
Denim fibers from an old pair of jeans through a microscope

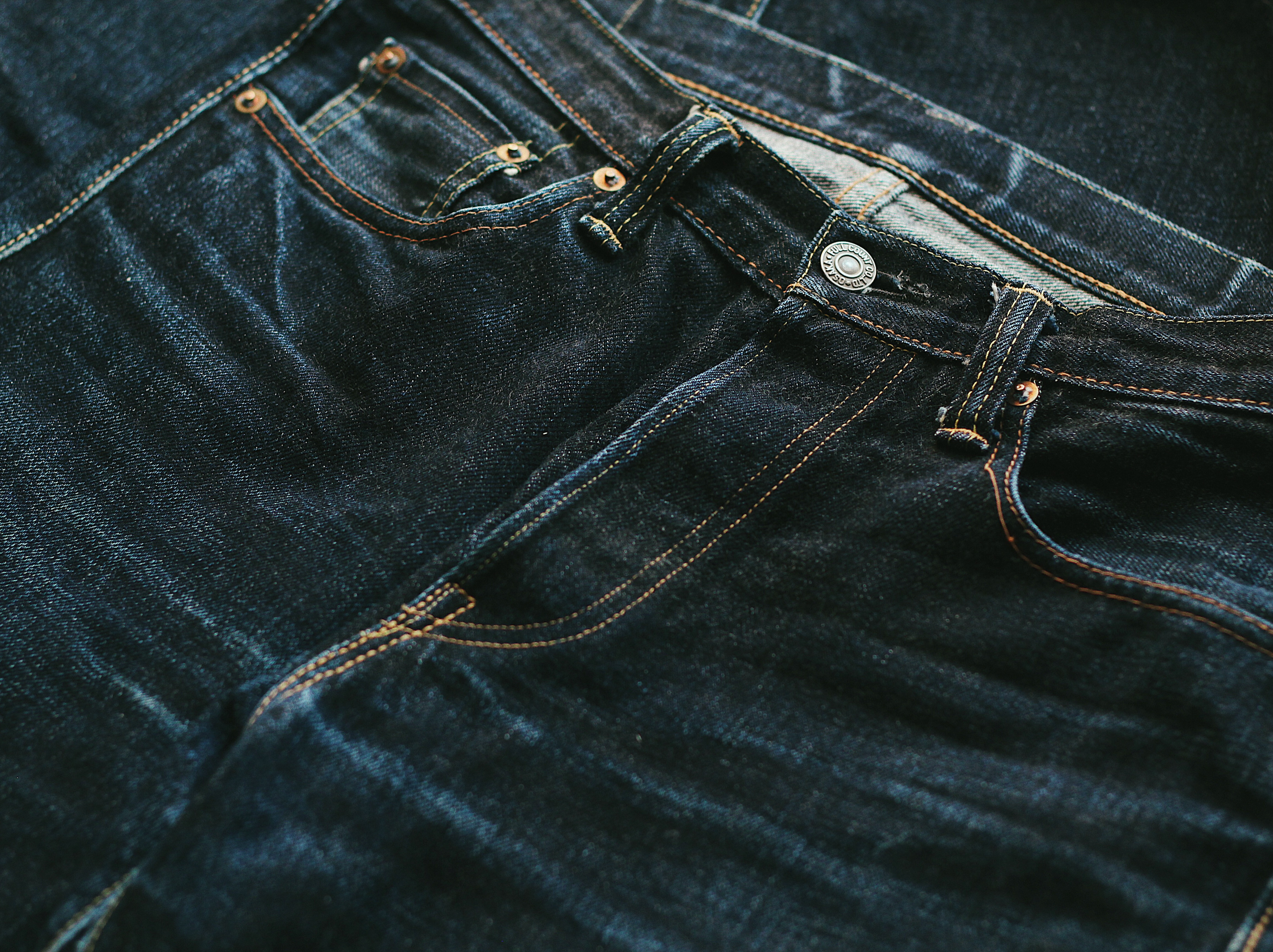
Natural fading on a worn pair of selvedge jeans. Such patterns are sometimes referred to as 'whiskers' or 'honeycombs'.

===== Distressed jeans =====
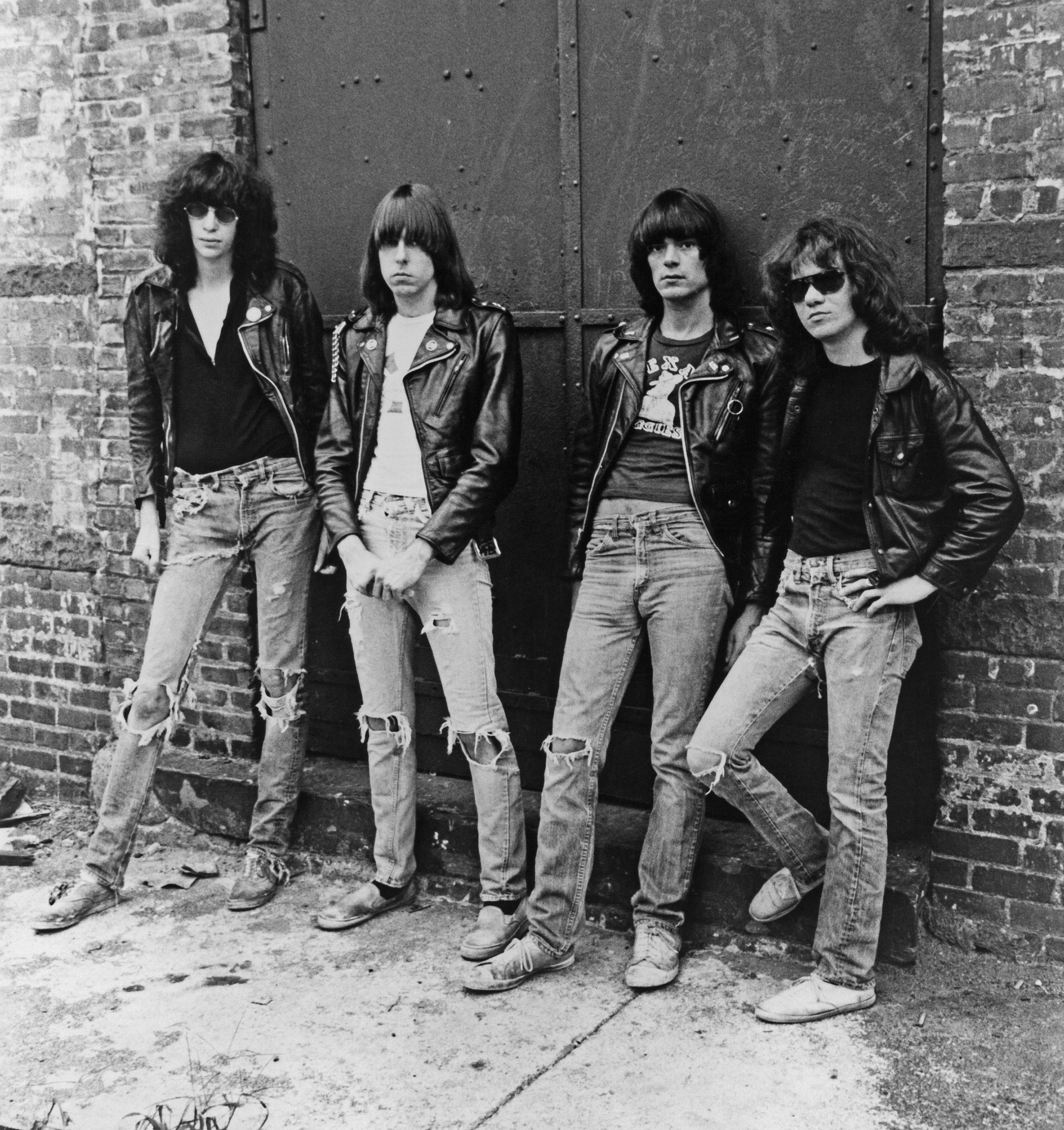
Punk rock spearheads the Ramones wearing distressed jeans.

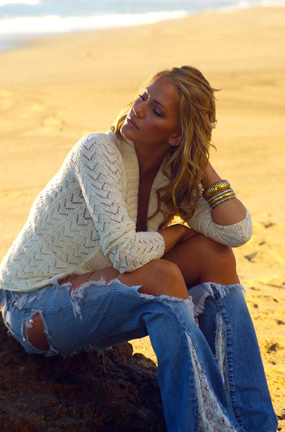
Ripped jeans were worn by singer Leigh Jones in this promotional photo.

Distressed denim emerged from the cultural punk movement in the 1970s. However, it was at the beginning of the 1970s that Iggy Pop from The Stooges that initially introduced the concept of ripped jeans as clothing on to the stage. It was after that the punk band The Ramones codified the look in tight fitting jeans and made it part of their personal uniform. This informed the punk movement as a whole and became part of punk's fashion. Whilst some punks may have tore apart consumer goods as an expression of their anger towards capitalism and corporate greed, the vast majority used it as a 'poor' aesthetic and an anti-fashion type of fashion statement, which fitted in with the do-it-yourself ethic and punk's non-conformity. According to the Please Kill Me website, “Rips signaled something very important: the fact that wearer didn’t care at all about opinions public, personal or sartorial. Invisible scars were made obvious in the outer cloth”.

In the 1980s, clothes manufacturers gentrified the notion by selling clothes with safety pins already in them, so the original meaning of punk was lost. Denim became a key target of this anti-fashion deconstruction, with both men and women donning torn pants and jackets, accessorized with safety pins and slogans. The original trend became popular again in the 1990s with the emergence of grunge fashion. The grunge youth wore loose-fitting ripped jeans, flannel shirts or woolen Pendletons layered over T-shirts. Their anti-conformist approach to fashion led to the popularization of the casual chic look, a trend which continued into the 2000s.

=== Environmental and humanitarian impact ===
A typical pair of blue jeans uses 3,479 litres (919 US gal) of water during its life cycle. This includes the water to irrigate the cotton crop, manufacture the jeans, and the numerous washes by the consumer. During production, the typical amount for washing with traditional Pullman machines reaches 90 litres per jeans, which can be reduced to about 27 litres using modern frontloaders. Novel washing processes such as Droptima can reduce that to 6 litres fresh water plus 4 litres used water.

The production of jeans with a "used look" can be more environmentally damaging than regular jeans, depending on how the waste compounds are processed. Sandblasting and treating with sandpaper has the risk of causing silicosis to the workers, and in Turkey, more than 5,000 textile workers have been stricken with this disease, and 46 people are known to have died. Some companies have announced they are banning the use of sandblasting.

== Care and wear ==
Despite most jeans being "pre-shrunk", they are still sensitive to slight further shrinkage and loss of color from being washed. The Levi Strauss company recommends avoiding washing jeans as much as possible. These and other suggestions to avoid washing jeans where possible have encountered criticism. Cory Warren, editor of LS&Co. Unzipped, clarifies in a response to such a criticism:

Our advice is to wash less often, but clearly, you have to judge for yourself what's appropriate. Hot day, dirty job? Wash your jeans. Please! Cold day, office job? Maybe you can wear them twice or more before they go back to the washing machine. Personally, if I wear a pair of jeans to work on Friday—cool climate, office job—I tend to wear them on Saturday. And if Saturday is spent indoors and I'm not spilling food all over myself, I might even wear them on Sunday.

— Corey Warren

For those who prefer to refrain from washing their jeans there have been suggestions to freeze them in order to kill the germs that cause odor. However, this advice has been proven ineffective.

== Legal cases ==
=== Italian rape trial ===
In Rome, Italy, in 1992, a 45-year-old driving instructor was accused of rape. When he picked up an 18-year-old girl for her first driving lesson, he allegedly raped her for an hour, then told her that if she was to tell anyone he would kill her. Later that night she told her parents and her parents agreed to help her press charges. While the alleged rapist was convicted and sentenced, the Italian Supreme Court of Cassation later overturned the conviction in 1998 because the victim wore tight jeans. It was argued that she must have necessarily had to help her attacker remove her jeans, thus making the act consensual ("because the victim wore very, very tight jeans, she had to help him remove them... and by removing the jeans... it was no longer rape but consensual sex"). The court stated in its decision "it is a fact of common experience that it is nearly impossible to slip off tight jeans even partly without the active collaboration of the person who is wearing them."

The ruling sparked widespread feminist protest. The day after the decision, women in the Italian Parliament protested by wearing jeans and holding placards that read "Jeans: An Alibi for Rape". As a sign of support, the California Senate and the California Assembly followed suit. Patricia Giggans, the executive director of the Los Angeles Commission on Assaults Against Women (now Peace Over Violence) soon made Denim Day an annual event. As of 2011 at least 20 U.S. states officially recognize Denim Day in April. Wearing jeans on that day has become an international symbol of protest against such attitudes about sexual assault. In 2008 the Supreme Court of Cassation overturned the ruling, so there is no longer a "denim" defense to the charge of rape.

=== Rokotov-Faibishenko case ===
In 1957, during the 6th World Festival of Youth and Students held in Moscow, Soviet Union (present-day Russia), Western-made jeans were first introduced to the communist state and sparked "jeans fever" at the time. People preferred to wear Western-made blue jeans rather than local-made black ones. In Soviet ideology, such an action challenged communist-made jeans and symbolized Western victory. In 1961, two ringleaders, Y. T. Rokotov and V. P. Faibishenko, were caught with their group for smuggling currencies from other countries along with blue jeans and other contraband. Under the leadership of Nikita Khrushchev, the duo were executed.

== Trends ==
=== Worldwide market for jeans ===
North America accounts for 39% of global purchases for jeans, followed by Western Europe at 20%, Japan and Korea at 10% and the rest of the world at 31%.

United States consumers spent more than US$14 billion on jeans in 2004 and US$15 billion in 2005. US consumers bought US$13.8 billion of men's and women's jeans in the year that ended April 30, 2011 (~$19.5 billion in 2025), according to market-research firm NPD Group.

=== Soviet Union ===
In the Soviet Union, jeans were the symbol of the Western way of life. The "jeans fever" in the USSR started in 1957 during the World Festival of Youth and Students. According to a 1961 Soviet textile dictionary, jeans were initially referred to as a "worker's uniform" (рабочий костюм, rabochii kostyum).

The jeans brand Rokotov and Fainberg is named after the defendants in the Rokotov–Faibishenko case, Yan T. Rokotov and Vladislav P. Faibishenko, who were executed for, among other things, trafficking in jeans.

Although not outright banned, jeans were hard to come by in the Soviet Union since they were seen as a symbol of rebellion by the Soviet youth, who wanted to emulate the style of film and rock stars of the West. The Soviet government resisted supplying the market with jeans as it would mean responding to the market, a capitalist principle. People went to great lengths, sometimes by resorting to violence and other illegal activities, to obtain real Western-made jeans. That led to the creation of black markets and to the bootlegging of jeans, which since has become an important cultural element of the history of the Soviet Union.

=== Market-share shift to activewear ===
In 2014, teens were buying more fashion and athleisure clothing from brands such as Nike and Lululemon over denim classics from brands like Abercrombie & Fitch. Activewear in 2014 comprised 28% of teens' apparel purchases, up from 6% in 2008. In 2014, Nike, Lululemon, Under Armour, and Adidas were the most popular brands for athletic apparel among teen consumers. Fashion retailers have begun to adjust their offerings accordingly. Bloomberg reports that Levi's stuck to its core product (denim) instead of adapting to consumer trends. As a result, Levi's sales decreased from over US$7 billion to US$4.8 billion in 2015.

In February 2021, it was found that sales for athleisure had risen by 84% since March 2020 as a result of the COVID-19 lockdowns.

== Variations on the basic type ==
- Cigarette: Designed to fit quite closely, but not tightly, to the thigh area, with a less close fit to the calf
- Cropped: Where the leg is cut to a lesser length, to somewhere above the ankle
- Relaxed
- Skinny: Worn to flatter the figure in the fashion of tight or close fitting
- Wide-leg; or with cropped variant: The waist line rides up past the wearer's actual waist, material below the knee is altogether away from the leg and descends as a straight line, standard type descends down to the ankle; cropped variant: the leg ceases at the lower leg mid-way down (or stops further down toward the ankle)
- Mom/Mum: Jeans which have a high waist (above the belly button), and are loose around the thighs, with a somewhat tapered fit.
- Straight-leg: Jeans which are the same width at the leg opening as they are at the bottom of the leg, making for a slightly baggy fit.
- Boyfriend: Often with a mid-low waist, boyfriend jeans have a baggy, "borrowed from the boys" fit.
- Flared, or bell-bottomed: Often fitted around the thigh area, then become wider from the knee down.
- High-waisted jeans were first popularized in the 1970s, but they have seen a resurgence in popularity in recent years. High-waisted jeans are characterized by a high rise that sits above the belly button. They can be fitted, relaxed, or loose-fitting, and they come in a variety of washes and colors.

=== Low-rise jeans ===
Media reported in 2017 that the trend of low-rise jeans, famous in the 1990s and 2000s, was coming back into fashion due to a sparked by an interest in Y2K style.

In the early 2000s, low-rise jeans were commonly seen on celebrities such as Britney Spears, Jennifer Lopez, Paris Hilton, Gwen Stefani and Christina Aguilera, attributing to the Y2K style. In 2021, online searches for 'y2k fashion' had risen by 193%, showing that the fashion style was making a comeback, and low-rise jeans were becoming a common clothing item for teenagers and young adults.

Low-rise jeans usually come 2–3 inches (5–8 cm) or more below the navel. Manufactured low-rise jeans have a shorter rise (distance between the waistband and crotch seam). The low-rise look can also be accomplished by letting jeans with longer rises fall lower than they are meant to. This is a less extreme version of sagging, which was popularized by male hip-hop artists in the 1990s.

== Industrial production ==
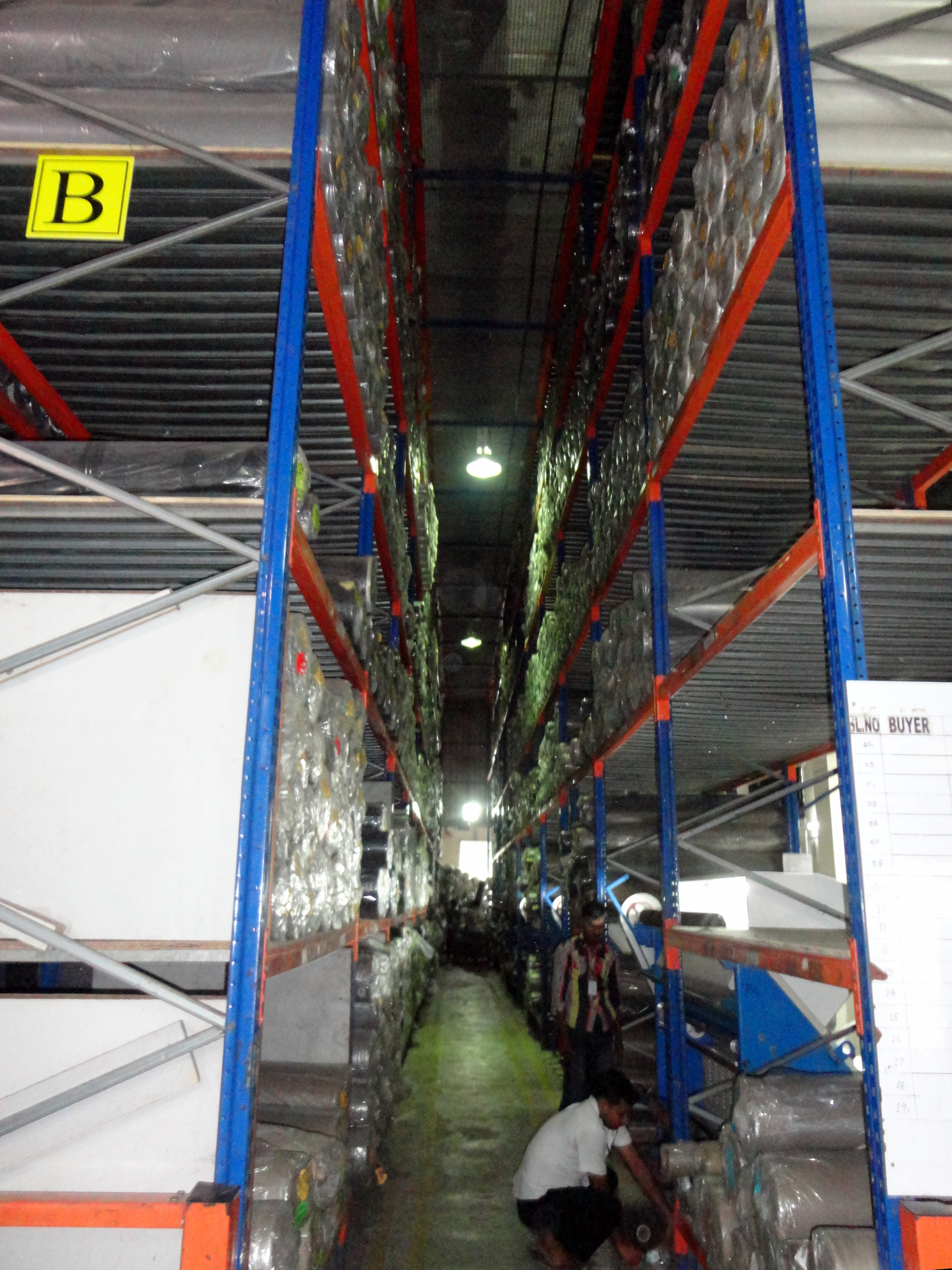
How denim fabric is stored in the factory

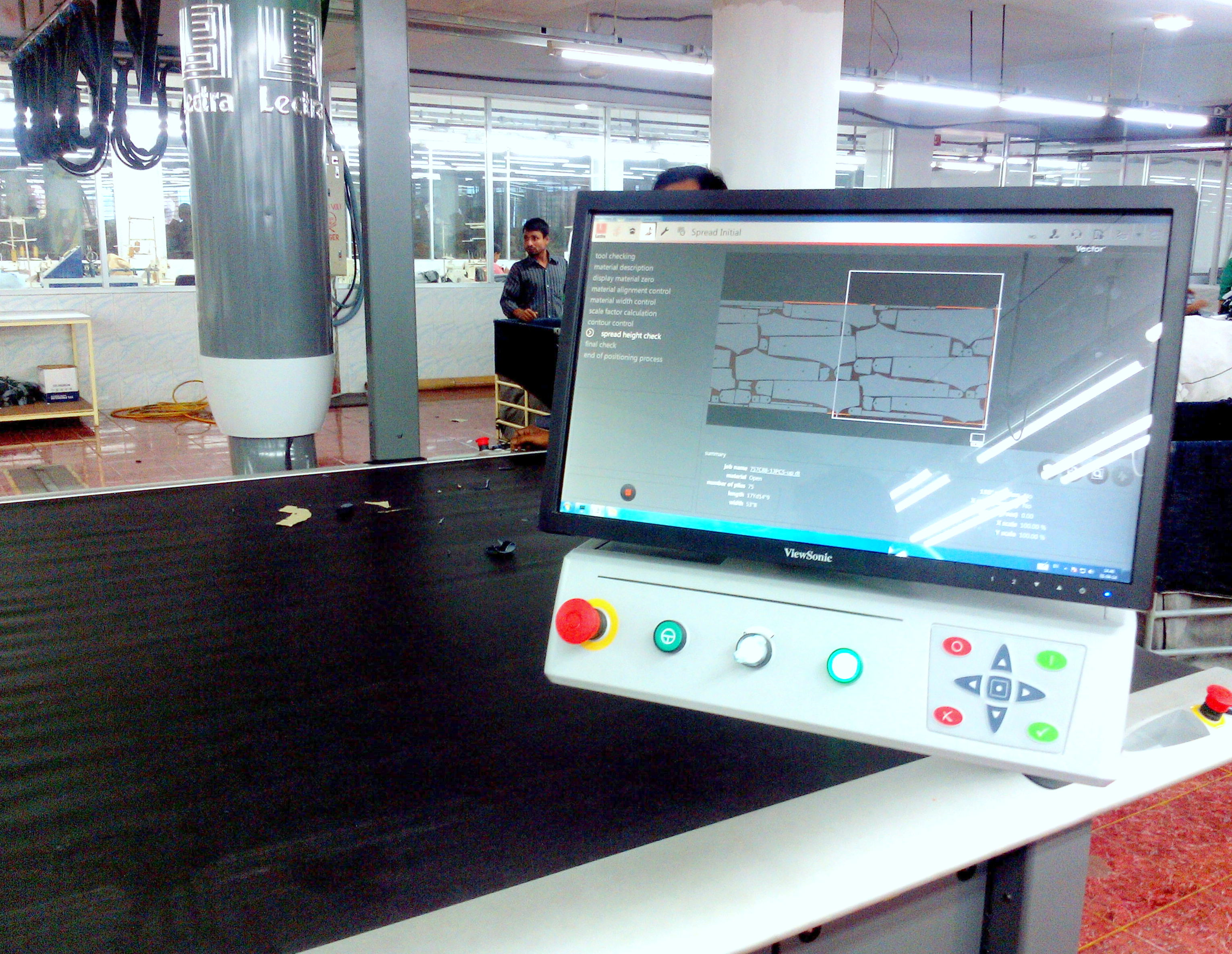
Automated cutting machines are used in RMG factory to cut the pieces.

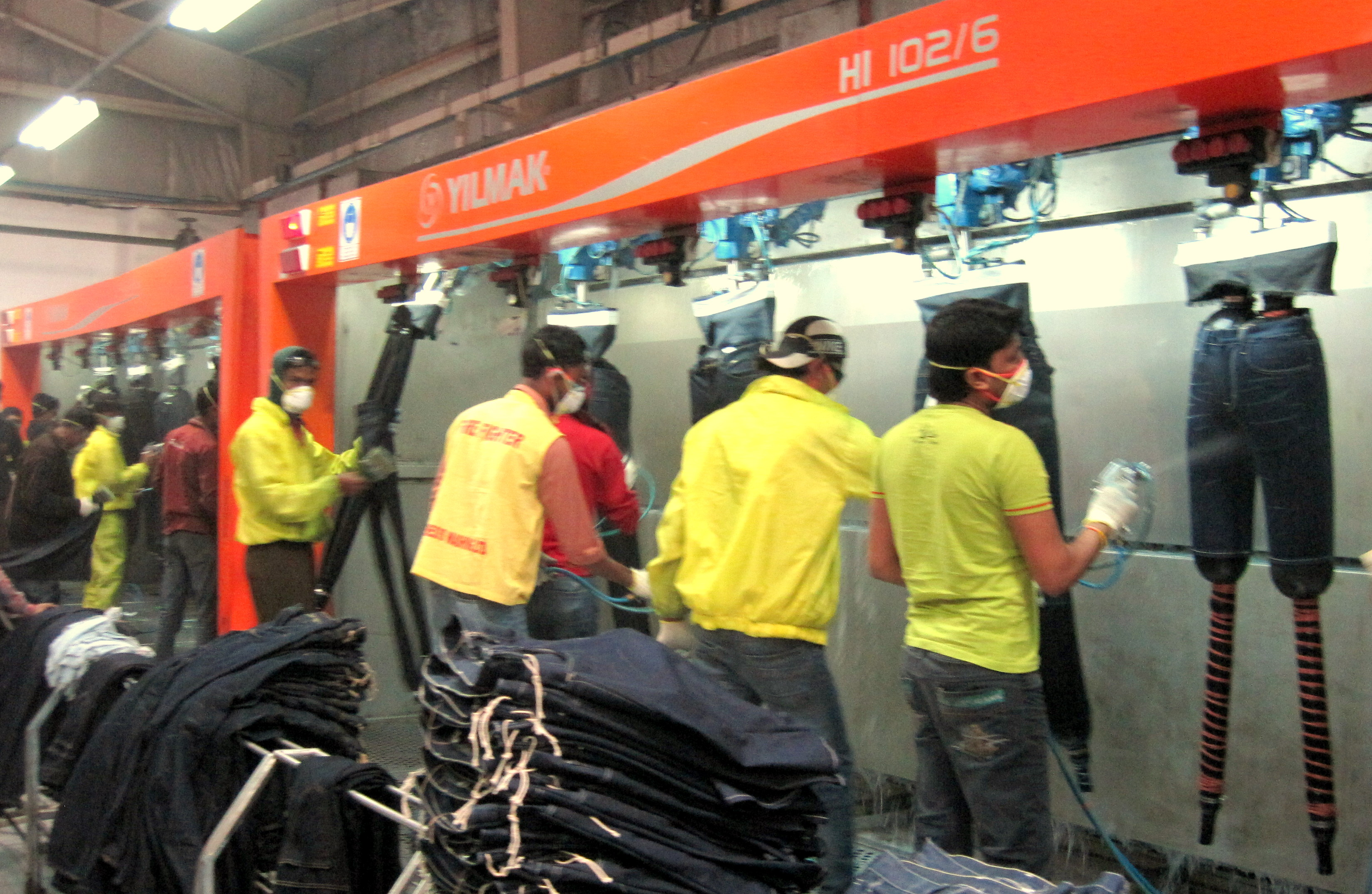
P P Spray and P P Sponging being applied to jeans to give them a new look

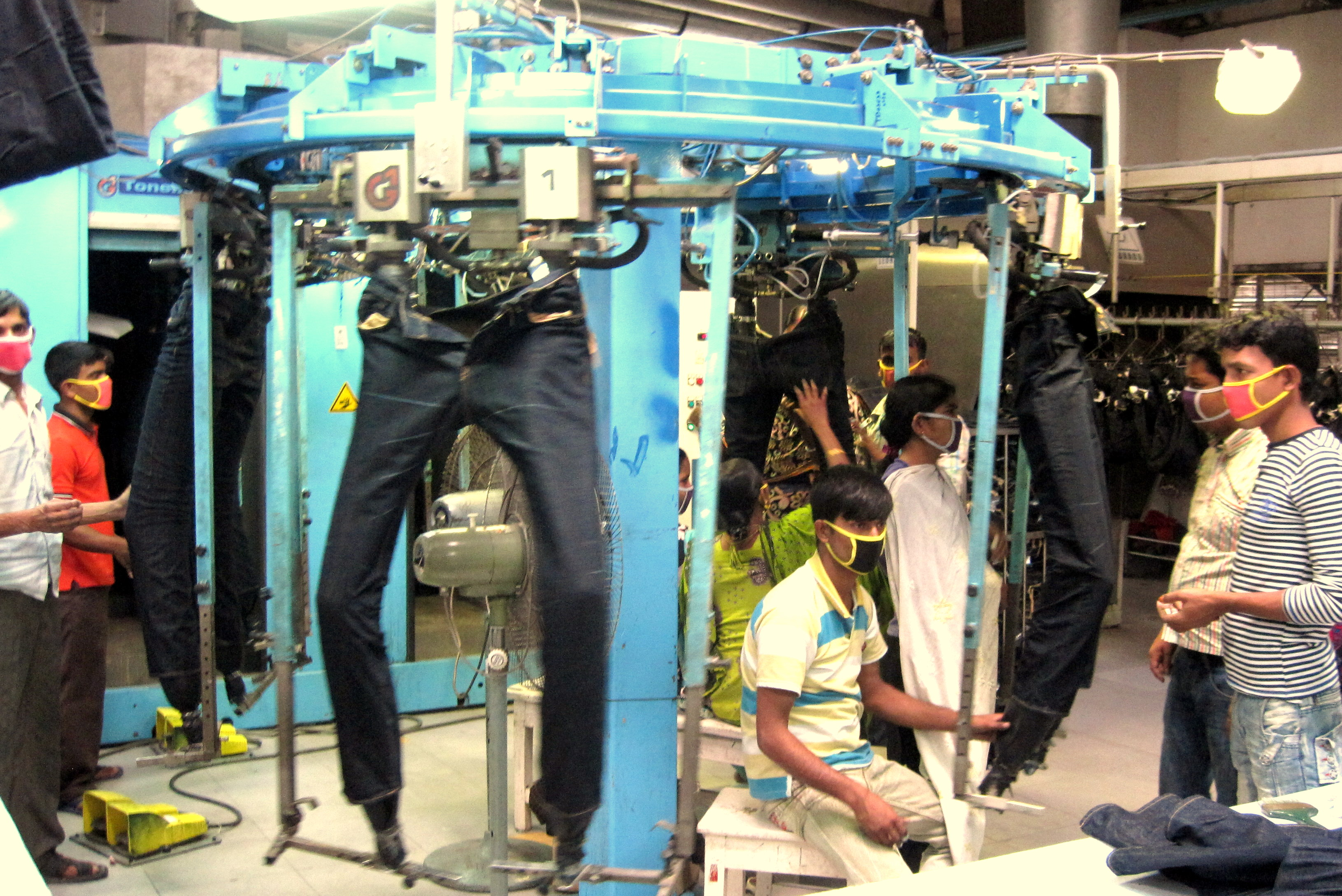
Adding 3D crunching, whiskers, and wrinkles to jeans to make them look more used

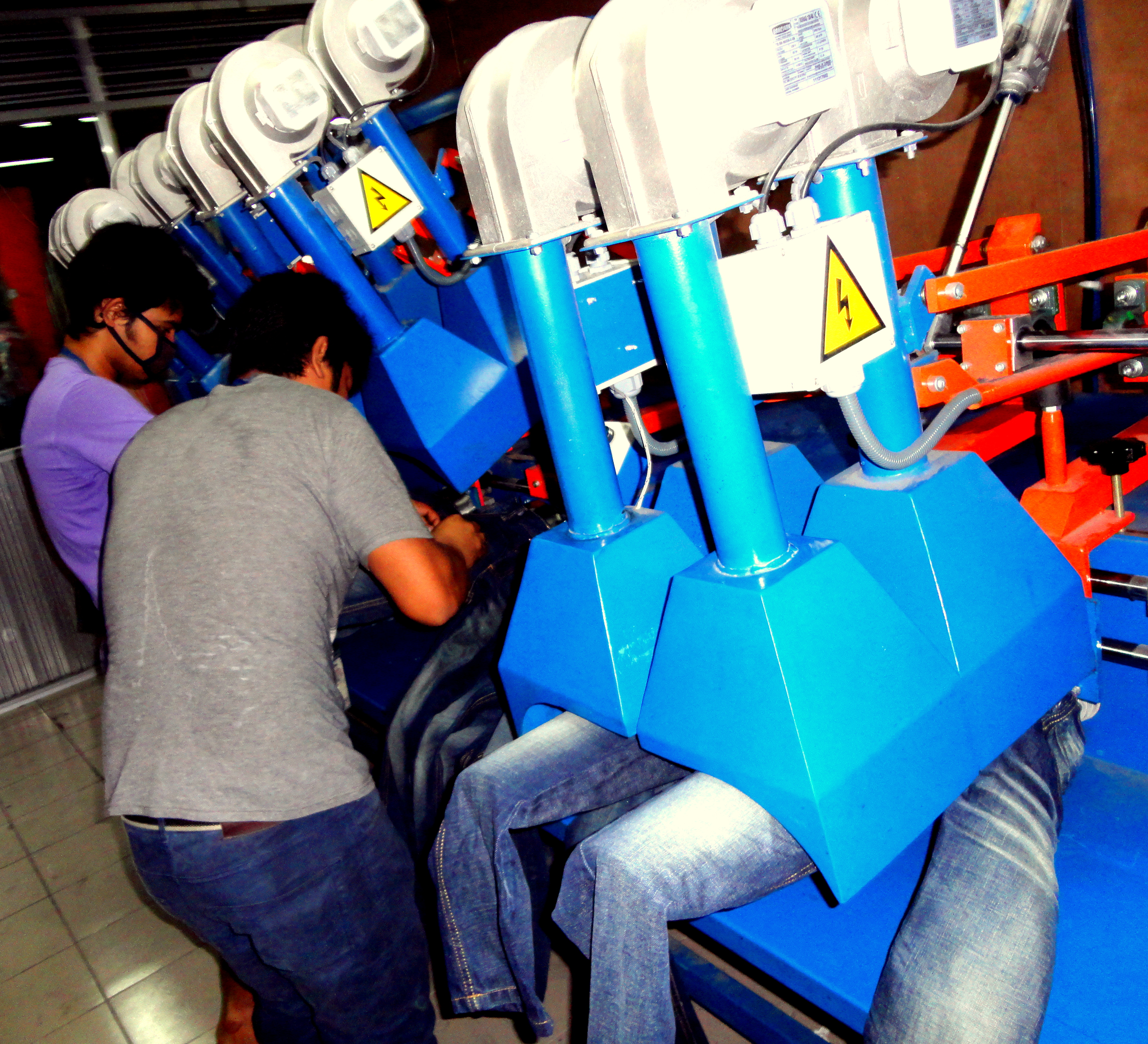
Applying permanent wrinkles to jeans

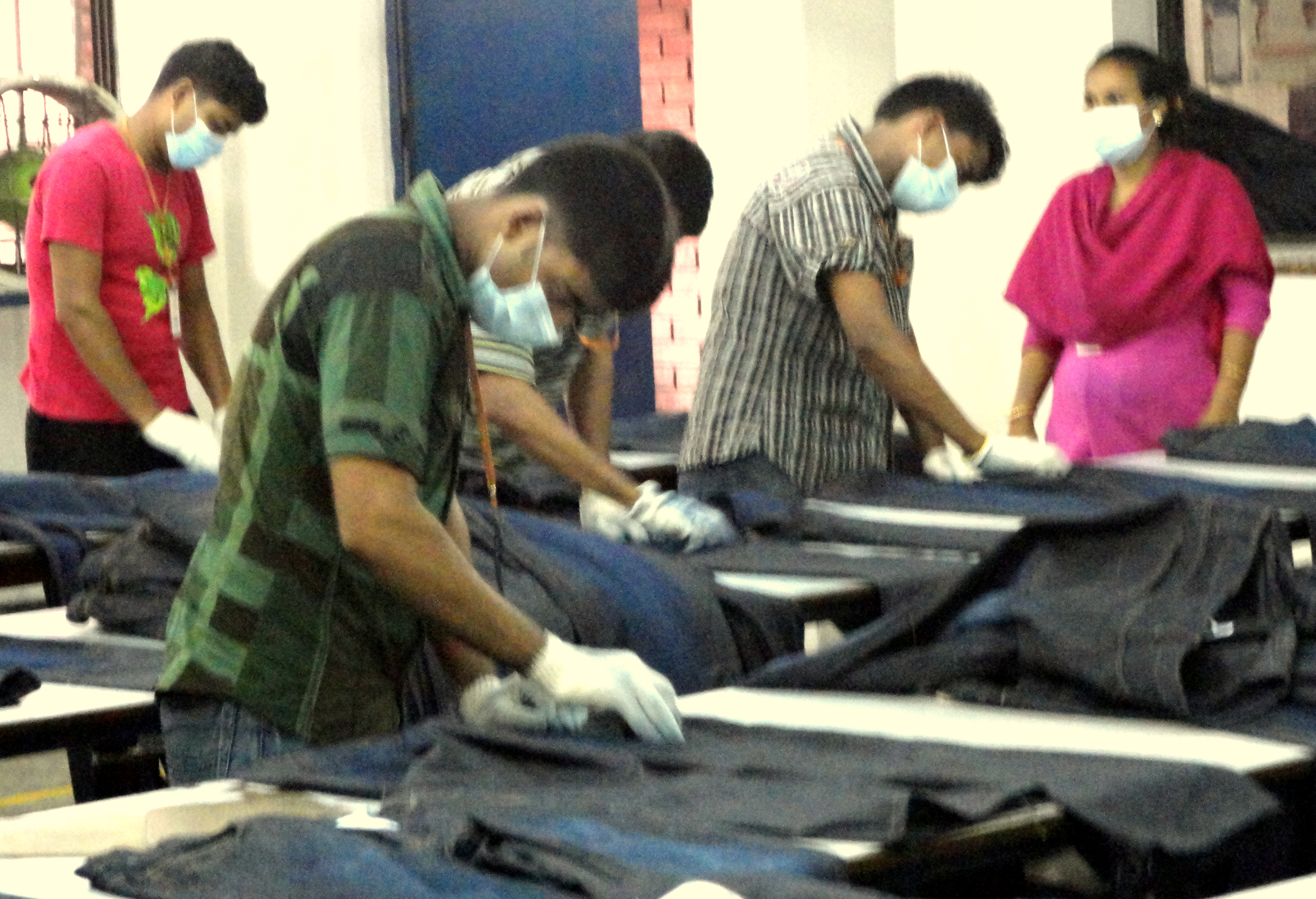
Hand scraping of jeans

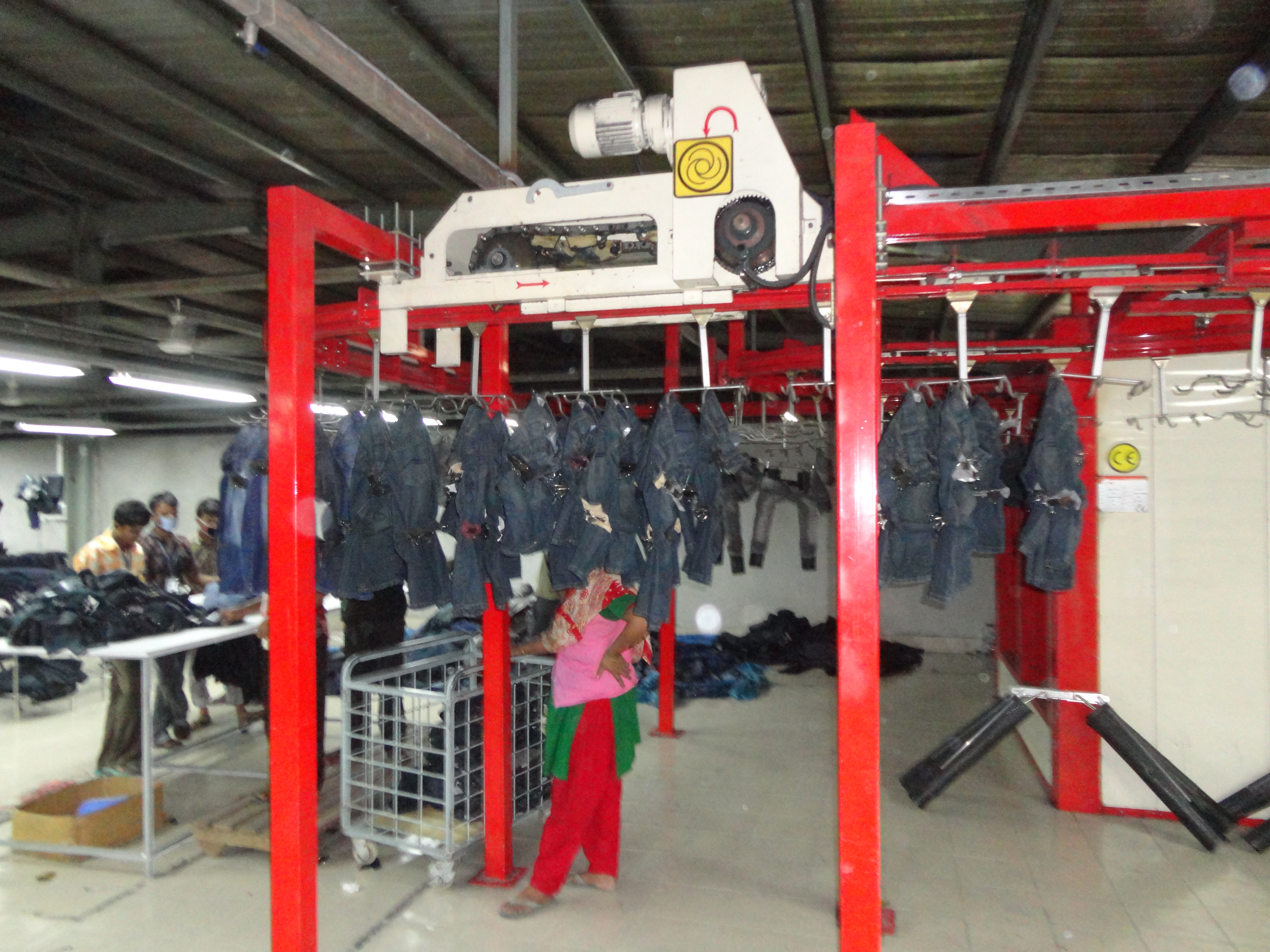
Resin treatment process on jeans

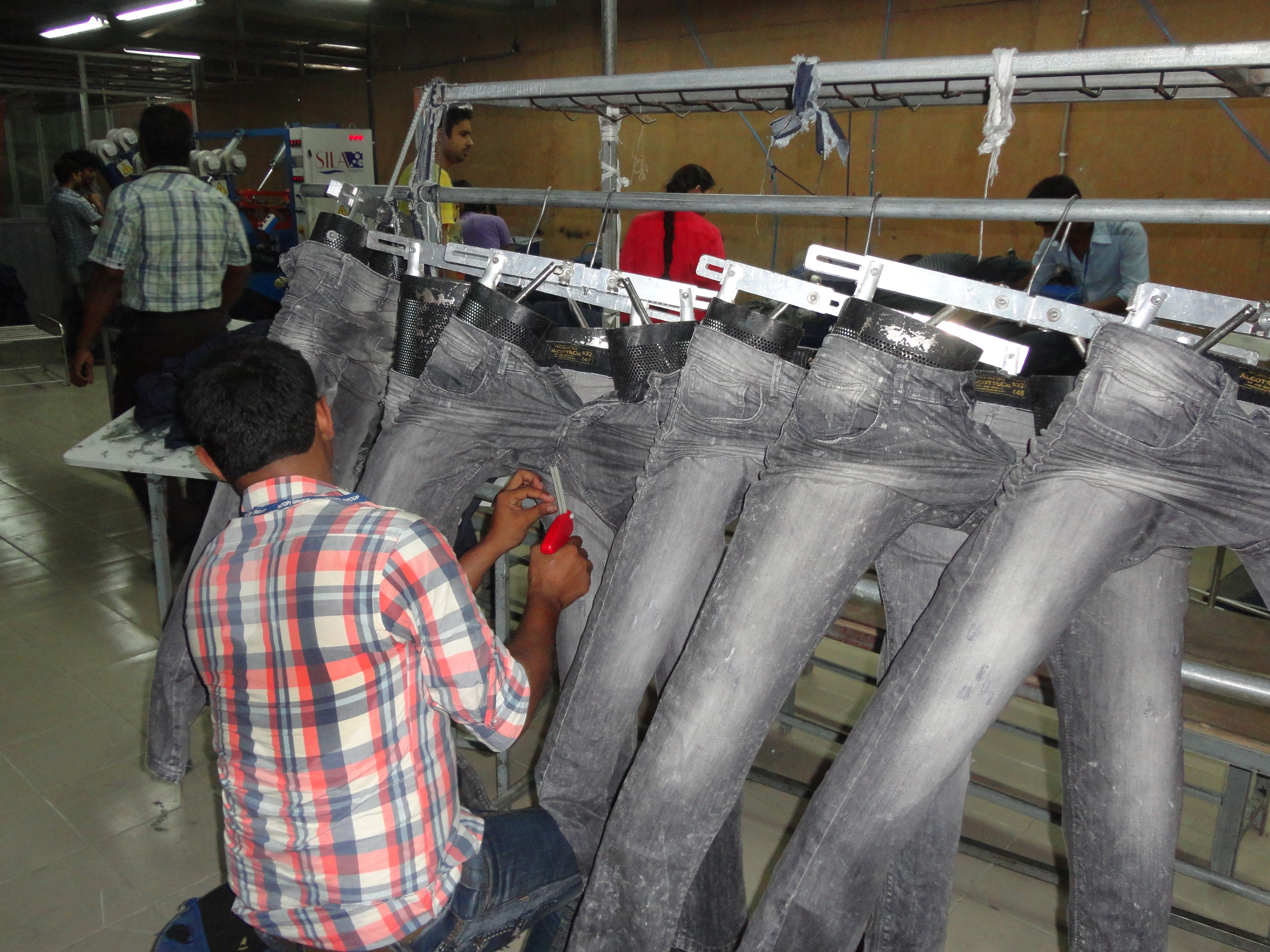
Tacking on jeans, which adds strength to high-stress areas

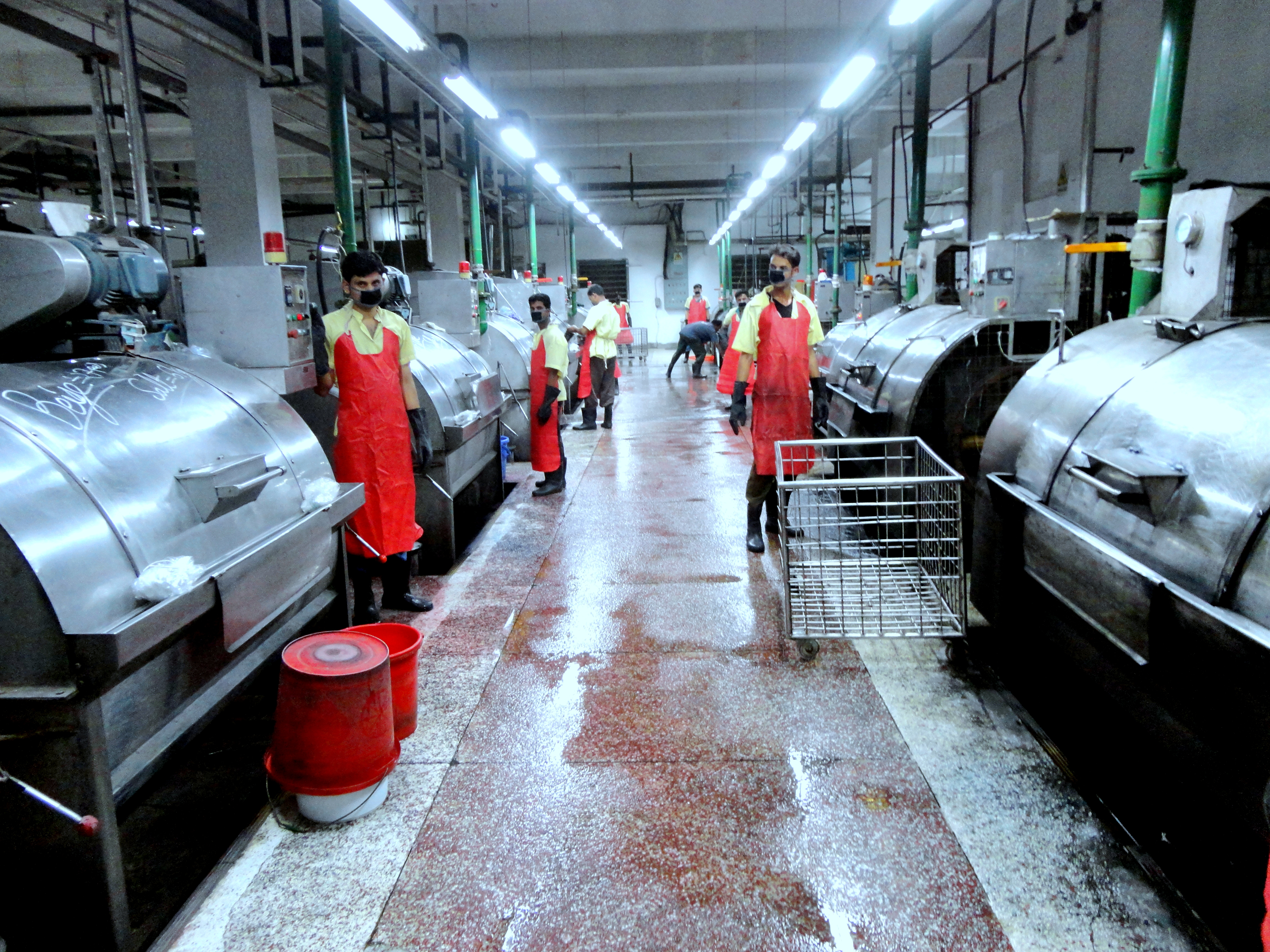
Socks dyeing machine in a washing plant for washing jeans

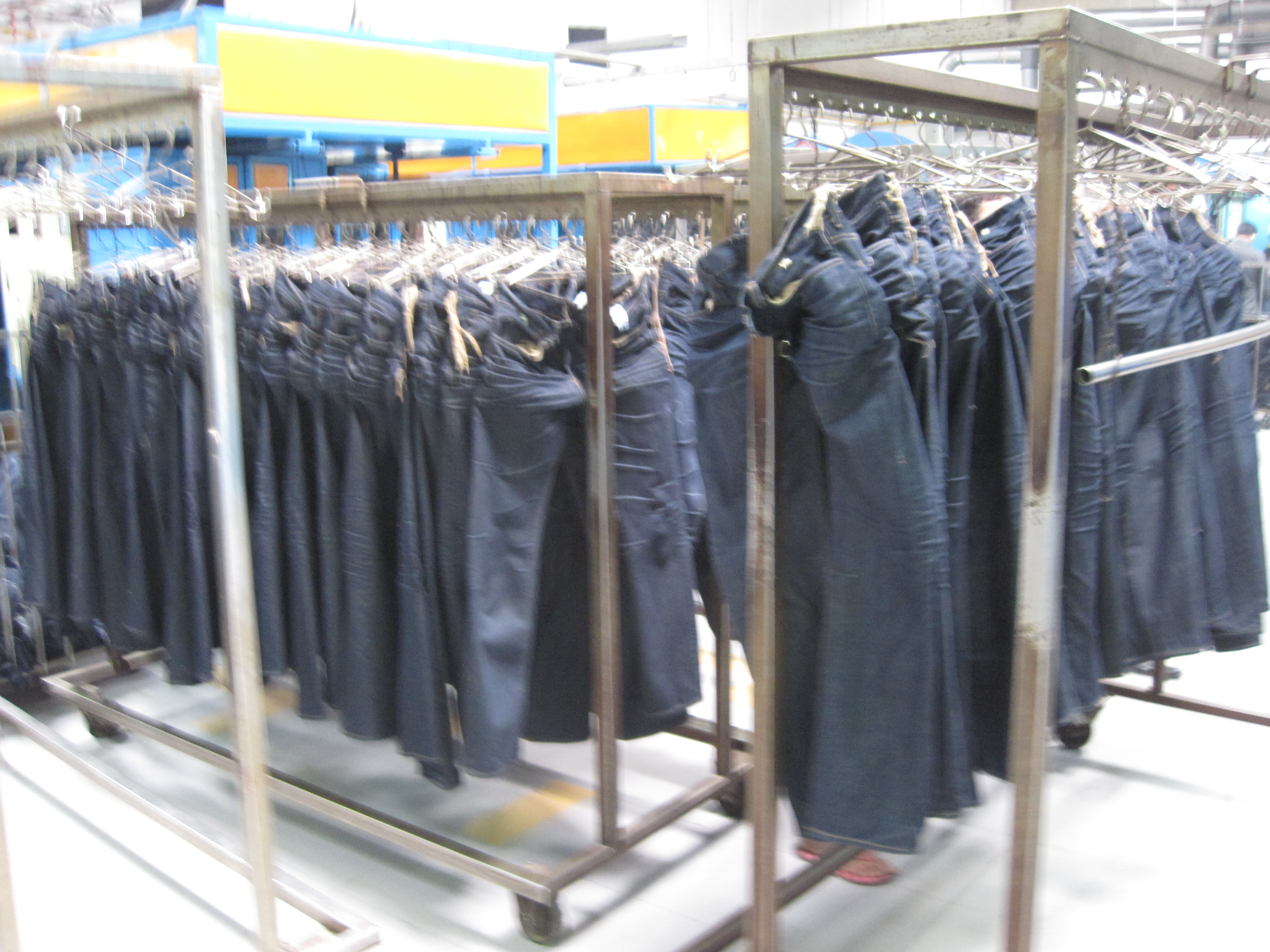
The process of washing and drying jeans

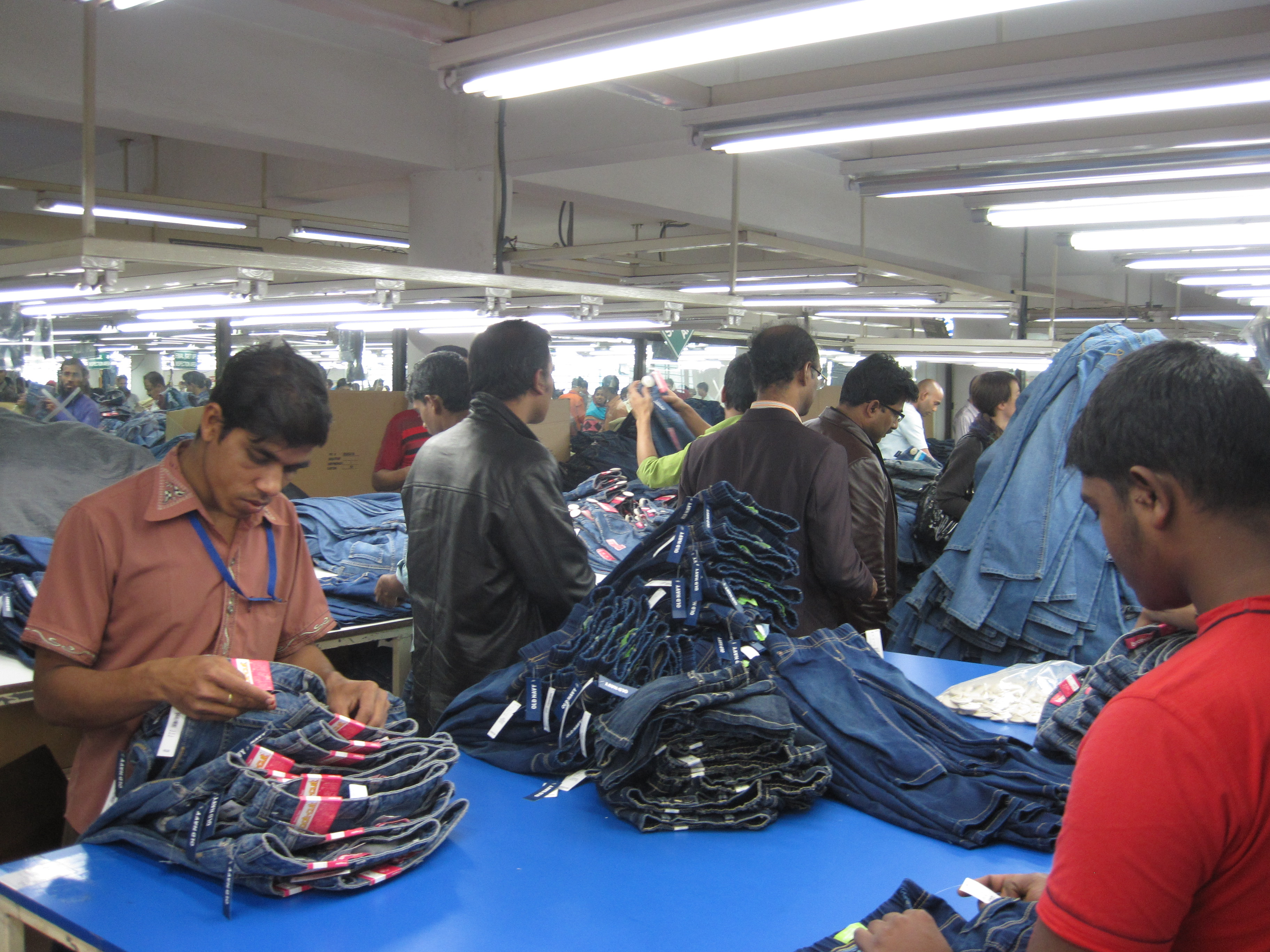
The final steps of preparing jeans for market

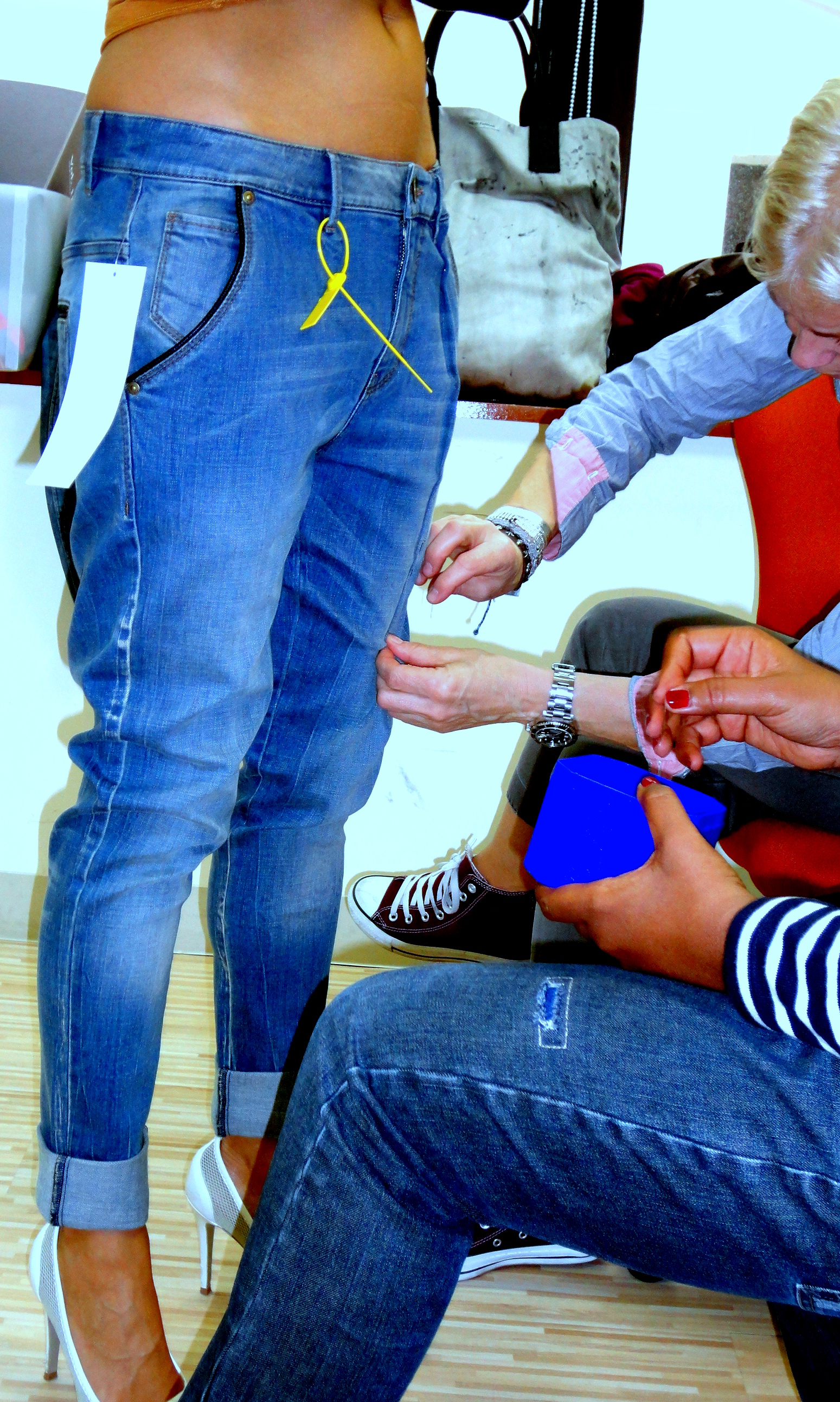
Checking the fit on a live model

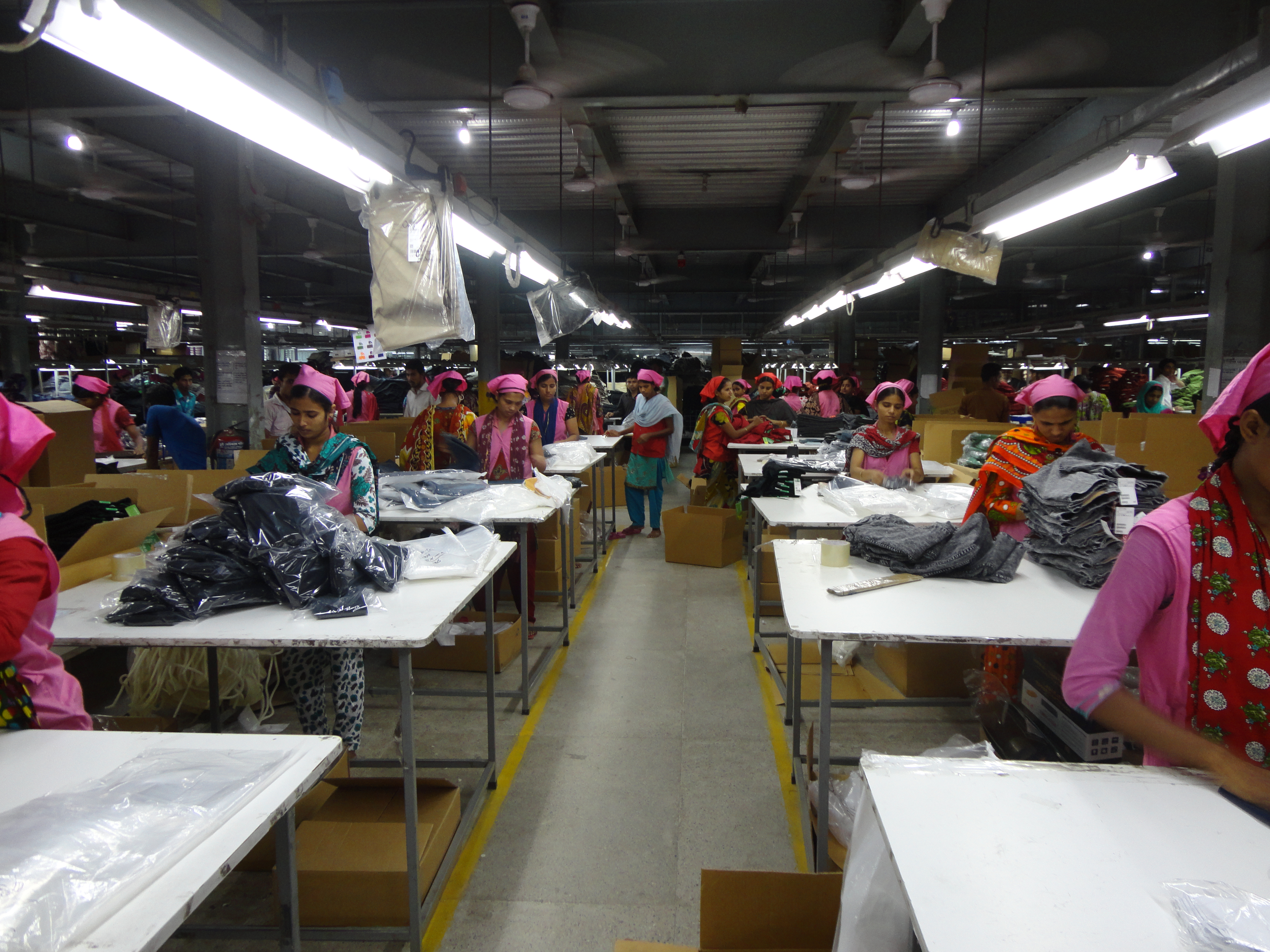
Quality checking and quality assurance

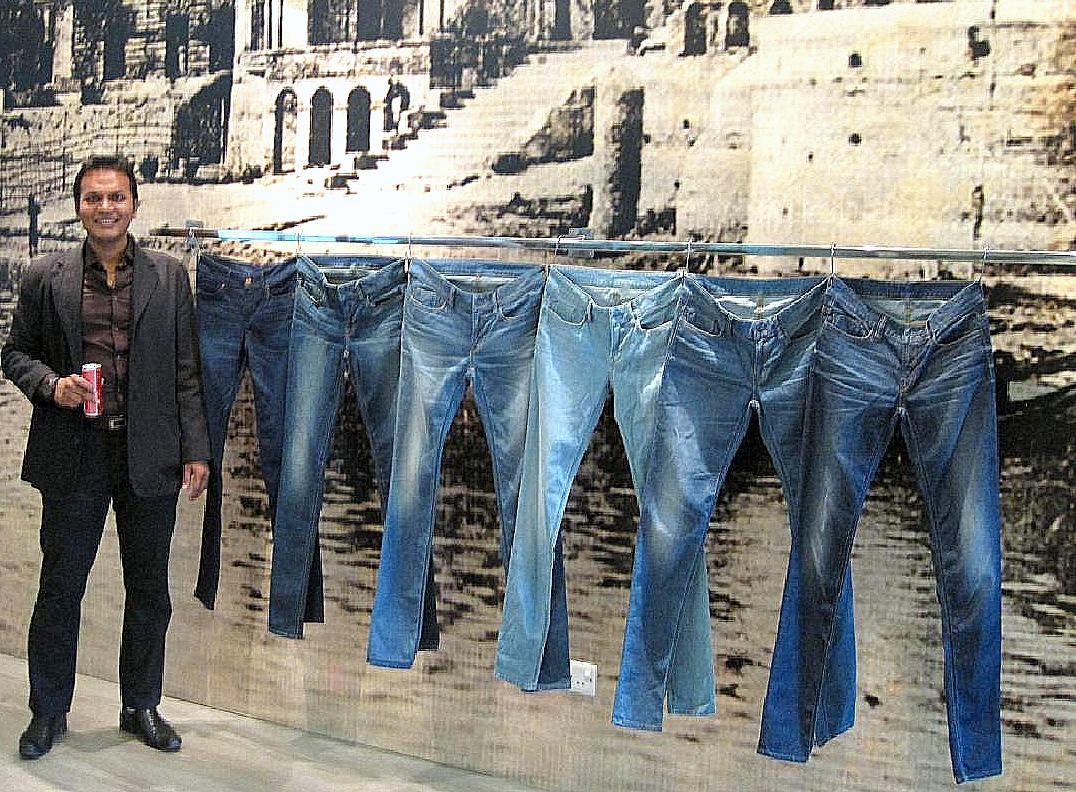
Jeans are displayed for the buyer in the RMG factory showroom.

== See also ==
- Athleisure
- Baggy jeans
- Bell-bottoms
- Daisy Dukes
- Denim skirt ("jean" skirt)
- Designer jeans
- Drainpipe jeans
- Jean jacket
- Jeggings
- Jorts ("jean shorts")
- Mom jeans
- Trousers as women's clothing
- Western fashion
