= Denim =

Warp-faced textile

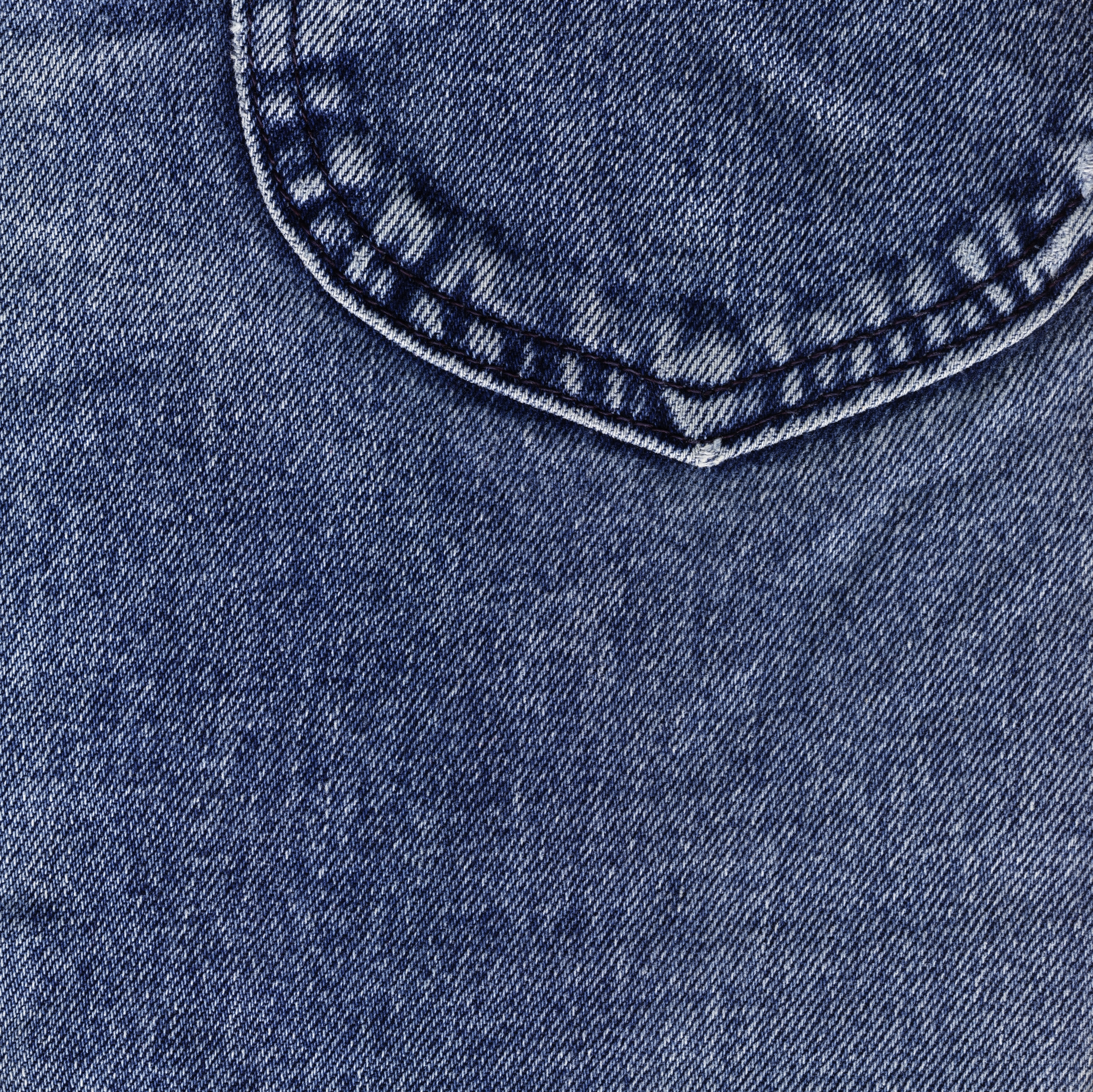
Denim fabric dyed with indigo and then washed heavily

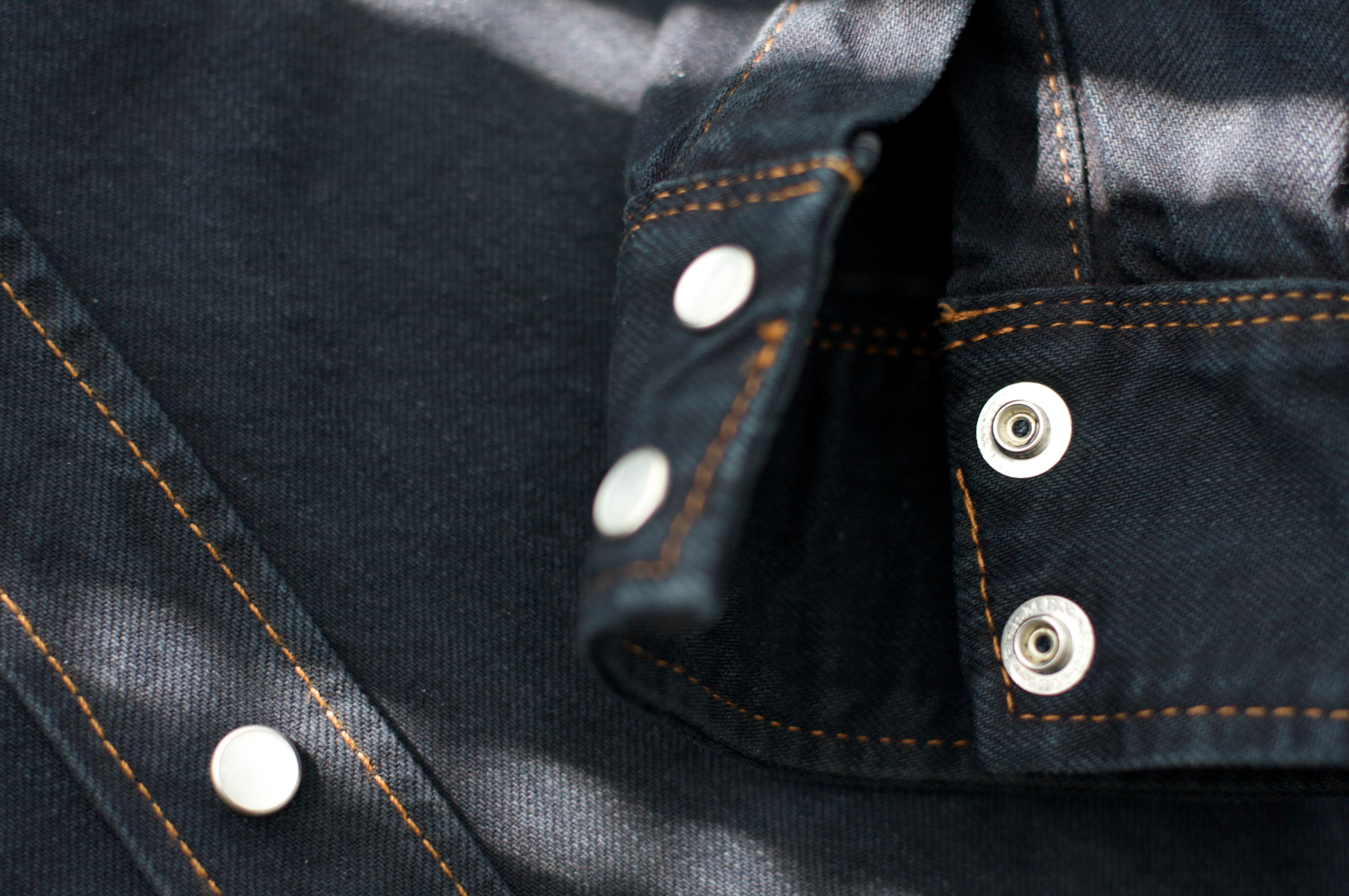
Denim fabric dyed with indigo and black dyes and made into a shirt

Denim is a sturdy, cotton, warp-faced textile in which the weft passes under two or more warp threads. This twill weave produces a diagonal ribbing that distinguishes it from cotton duck. Denim, as it is recognised today, was first produced in Nîmes, France.

Denim is available in a range of colors, but the most common type of denim is indigo denim in which the warp threads are dyed while the weft threads are left white. As a result of the warp-faced twill weave, one side of the textile is dominated by the blue warp threads, and the other side is dominated by the white weft threads. Jeans made from this cloth are thus predominantly white on the inside. Denim is used to create a wide variety of garments, accessories, and furniture.

== Etymology ==
Denim originated as a contraction of the French phrase sergé de Nîmes ('serge from Nîmes').

== History ==
Denim has been used in the United States since the mid-19th century. Denim initially gained popularity in 1873 when Jacob W. Davis manufactured the first pair of rivet-reinforced denim pants. The popularity of denim jeans exceeded the production capacity of Davis's small shop, so he moved his production to the facilities of dry goods wholesaler Levi Strauss & Co., which had been supplying him with bolts of denim fabric.

Throughout the 20th century, denim was used for durable uniforms such as those issued to staff of the French national railways. In the post-war years, the Royal Air Force issued olive-drab denim coveralls (colloquially known as "denims") for dirty work.

During the mid-20th century, particularly in the 1950s and 1960s, denim underwent a significant shift in its functionality. Denim evolved from being primarily associated just about workwear and durability and became part of a younger culture. It was strongly associated with rebellion and nonconformity, which was being largely influenced by famous actors, popular films of the time, and significant figures. Younger generations began wearing denim on a more regular day basis rather than only wearing for work and labor. With younger ages starting to wear denim on a more regular basis it helped push denim into the mainstream fashion industry. By the late 1960s, denim had spread beyond just the United States and had become widely adopted in other parts of the world.

As denim became increasingly accepted by younger generations, its use expanded rapidly. By the late 1960s, it had moved from being seen as just rebellious clothing to something that was more widely accepted in everyday life. During this period, denim was also adopted by many countercultural movements, further strengthening its association with individuality and self-expression. By the end of this decade, denim had traveled beyond the United States and was being worn as fashion in Europe and many other parts of the world. This was one of the many milestones marking its transition from workwear to a global fashion material.

By the 1970s, denim had become fully integrated into mainstream culture and was no longer limited to youth or subcultures. It had extended into many other industries, including automotive design and fashion branding, reflecting its widespread popularity. This period marked the point at which denim had transitioned from a symbol of rebellion to a standard material used across a wide range of consumer products.

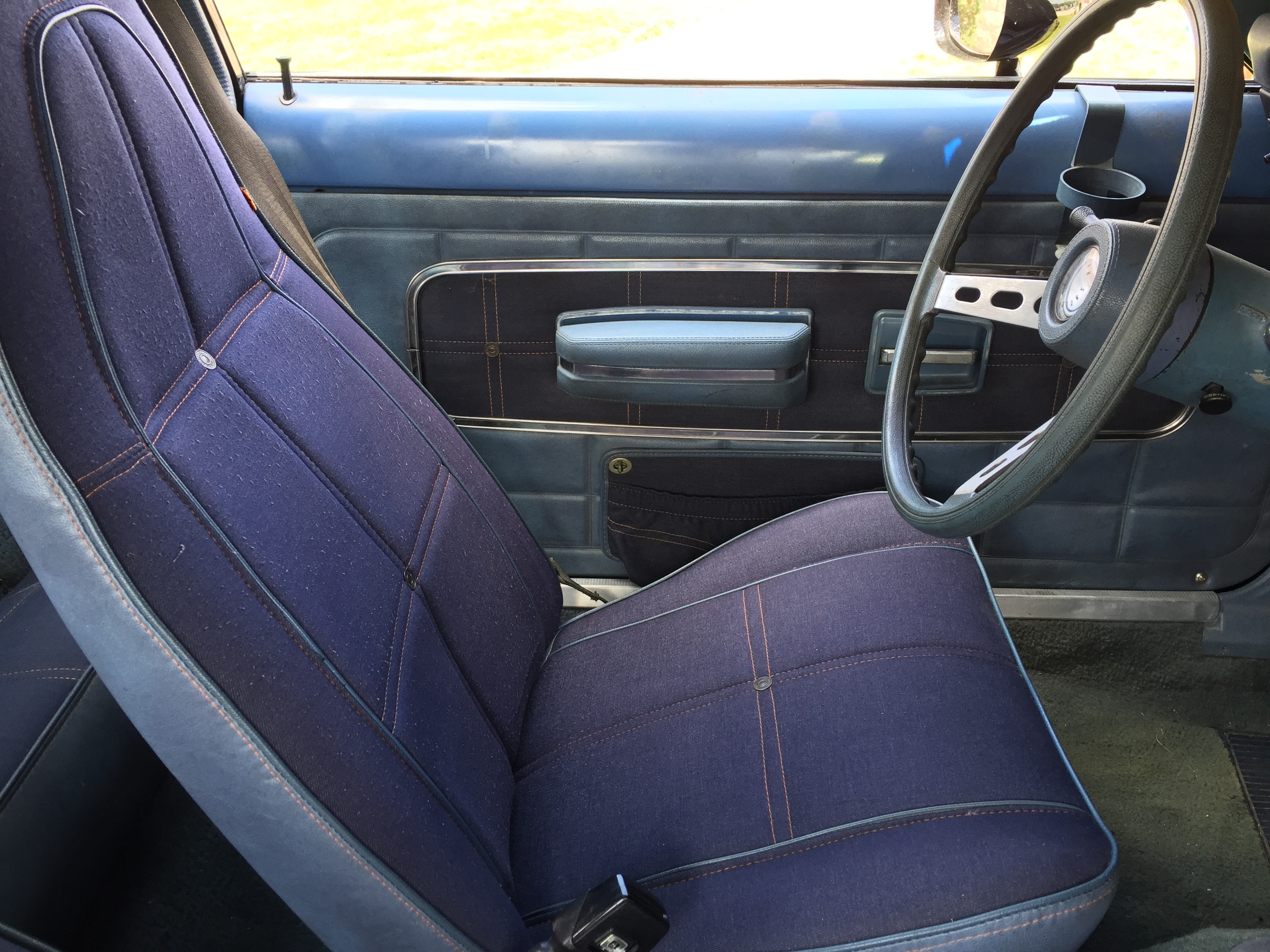
AMC Gremlin with Levi's trim and upholstery

Denim jeans were such an integral part of youth culture that automobile manufactures, beginning with American Motors Corporation began offering denim-like interior finishes. (Because denim cannot pass fire resistance safety standards, indigo-colored spun nylon or vinyl was used, with contrast stitching and copper rivets helping to sell the effect.) A Levi's-branded trim package debuted with AMC's 1973 model year. Similar packages were available from Volkswagen from 1973 to 1975 (the "Jeans Beetle") and from Jeep from 1975 through 1977.

In 2001, Japanese fashion designer Chuck Roaste obtained a United States utility patent for a reversible denim jeans construction method he had been developing since 1998. Produced under the Chuck Roaste label, the design featured fully reversible construction details—including pockets, fly, seams, fasteners, and related structural components—allowing the garments to be worn inside out. The concept was also extended to other apparel, including reversible denim shirts, skirts, and dresses.

In August 2025, the Denim Institute and Museum was announced. Founded by curator Loren Cronk and L'Agence CEO Jonny Saven, the institute functions as a non-profit dedicated to preserving denim culture via exhibits, classes and training. It opened in July 2026.

== Creating denim ==
All denim is created through generally the same process:

1. Raw cotton fibers are converted to filament yarn.
2. The warp yarn is dyed, while the weft is left undyed (usually) or dyed.
3. The yarns are woven on a shuttle loom, projectile loom, air-jet loom, or water-jet loom.
4. The woven product is sanforized.
5. Denim fabric

=== Yarn production ===
Traditional denim yarn is composed entirely of cotton. Once cotton fibers are cleaned and combed into long, cohesive lengths of similar-length fiber, they are spun into yarn using an industrial machine. Throughout the creation of denim, washes, dyes, or treatments are used to change the appearance of denim products.

Some yarns may substitute an elastane component such as Spandex/Lycra for up to 3% of the cotton, the woven form of which (typically called 'stretch denim') may have a elasticity of up to 15%.

=== Dyeing ===
Denim was originally dyed with indigo dye extracted from plants, often from the genus Indigofera. In South Asia, indigo dye was extracted from the dried and fermented leaves of Indigofera tinctoria; this is the plant that is now known as "true indigo" or "natural indigo". In Europe, the use of Isatis tinctoria, or woad, can be traced back to the 8th century BC, although it was eventually replaced by Indigofera tinctoria as the superior dye product. However, most denim today is dyed with synthetic indigo dye. In all cases, the yarn undergoes a repeated sequence of dipping and oxidation—the more dips, the stronger the color of the indigo.

Before 1915, cotton yarns were dyed using a skein dyeing process, in which individual skeins of yarn were dipped into dye baths. Rope dyeing machines were developed in 1915, and slasher or sheet dyeing machines were developed in the 1970s. These methods involve a series of rollers that feed continuous yarns in and out of dye vats. In rope dyeing, continuous yarns are gathered together into long ropes or groups of yarns – after these bundles are dyed, they must be re-beamed for weaving. In sheet dyeing, parallel yarns are laid out as a sheet in the same order in which they will be woven; because of this, uneven dye circulation in the bath can lead to side-to-side color variations in the woven cloth. Rope dyeing eliminates this possibility because color variations can be evenly distributed across the warp during beaming.

Denim fabric dyeing is divided into two categories: indigo dyeing (Indigo dye is a unique shade of blue) and sulfur dyeing (Sulfur dye is a synthetic organic dye and it is formed by sulphurisation of organic intermediates, this contains nitro or amino groups). Indigo dyeing produces the traditional blue color or shades similar to it. Sulfur dyeing produces specialty black and other colors, such as red, pink, purple, grey, rust, mustard, and green.

Indigo dyeing behaved differently from many other textile dyeing methods. Unlike many other dyes that fully penetrate the fibers of the material, indigo primarily adheres to the outer surface of the cotton yarns. This is what gives denim its distinctive aging characteristics. This happens because indigo is soluble in water and must be chemically reduced before dyeing; it is then rapidly oxidized when exposed to air. This results in the dye not fully reaching the core of the yarn, creating a layered structure with the outer parts of the yarn being colored, but the interior parts remaining lighter.

This surface-level dyeing produces what is commonly referred to as a ring-dyed structure of the denim. Over time, as the denim is worn, the fabric reveals the cotton's inner layers. This process leads to the characteristic fading patterns seen in denim, which can vary depending on the movement and stress points of the denim as it is worn and used. Particular areas that show the most fading are the knees, seams, and pockets.

Along with this, the method in which the indigo dye is applied to the cotton affects the appearance of the denim. Rope dyeing and slasher dyeing are two of the most common industrial techniques that are used. Each of which influences the color and consistency, as well as the production efficiency. While both methods rely on repetitions of dipping and oxidation cycles, there are differences in how the yarn is handled during the process, in which subtle variations in shade and the fabric's character can develop.

=== Weaving ===
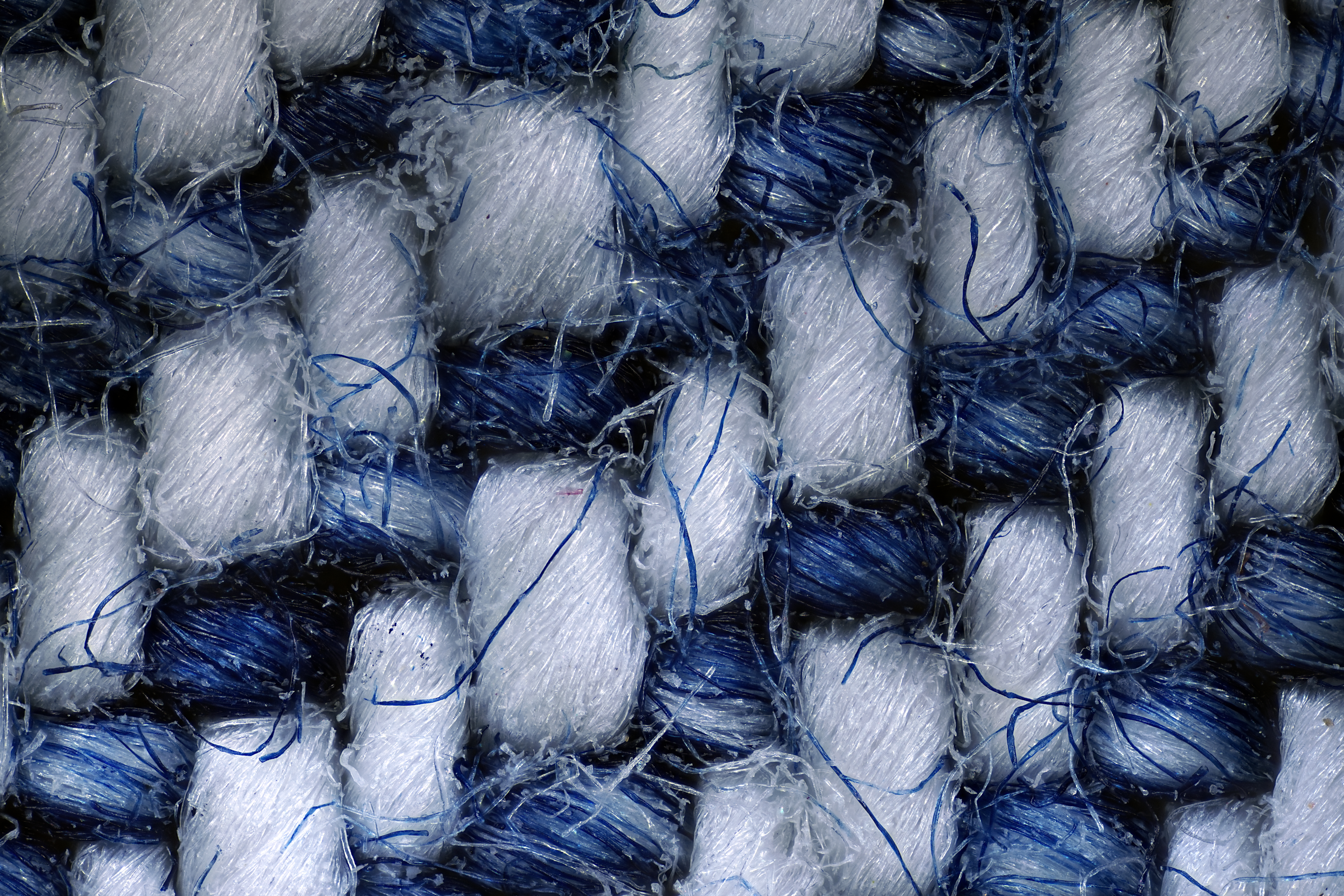
Denim under a microscope.

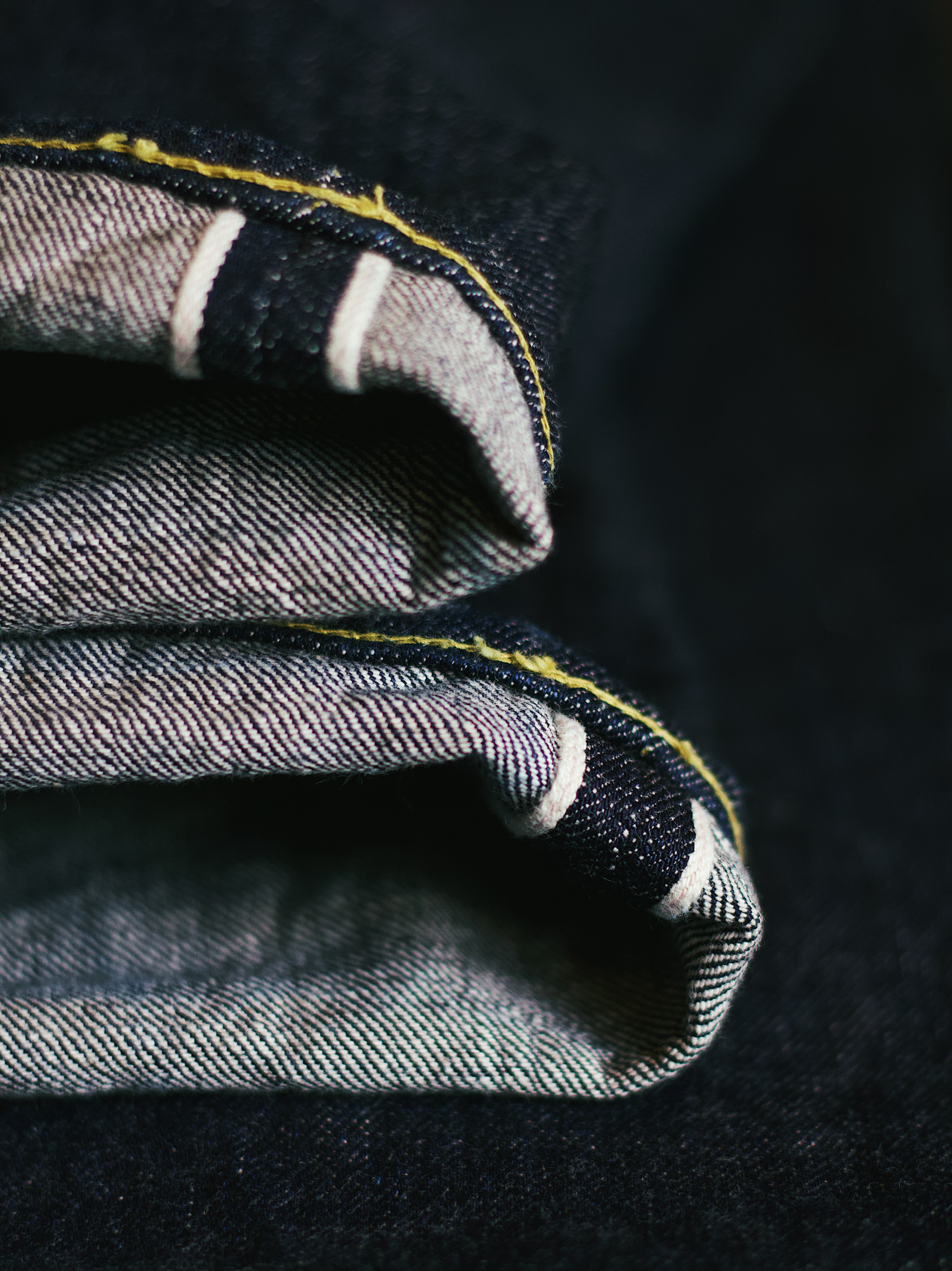
Selvedge identifier visible in white at the interior of a pair of jeans

Most denim made today is made on a shuttleless loom that produces bolts of fabric 60 inches (1,500 mm) or wider, but some denim is still woven on the traditional shuttle loom, which typically produces a bolt 30 inches (760 mm) wide. Shuttle-loom-woven denim is usually recognizable by its selvedge (sometimes written 'selvage'), the edge of a fabric created as a continuous cross-yarn (the weft) reverses direction at the edge side of the shuttle loom. The selvedge is traditionally accentuated with warp threads of one or more contrasting colors, which can serve as an identifying mark.

Although quality denim can be made on either loom, selvedge denim has come to be associated with premium products since final production that showcases the selvedge requires greater care of assemblage.

The weight of denim can vary greatly, with a yard of fabric weighing anywhere from 9 to 32 oz (260 to 910 g), with 11 to 14 oz (310 to 400 g) being typical.

== Uses ==
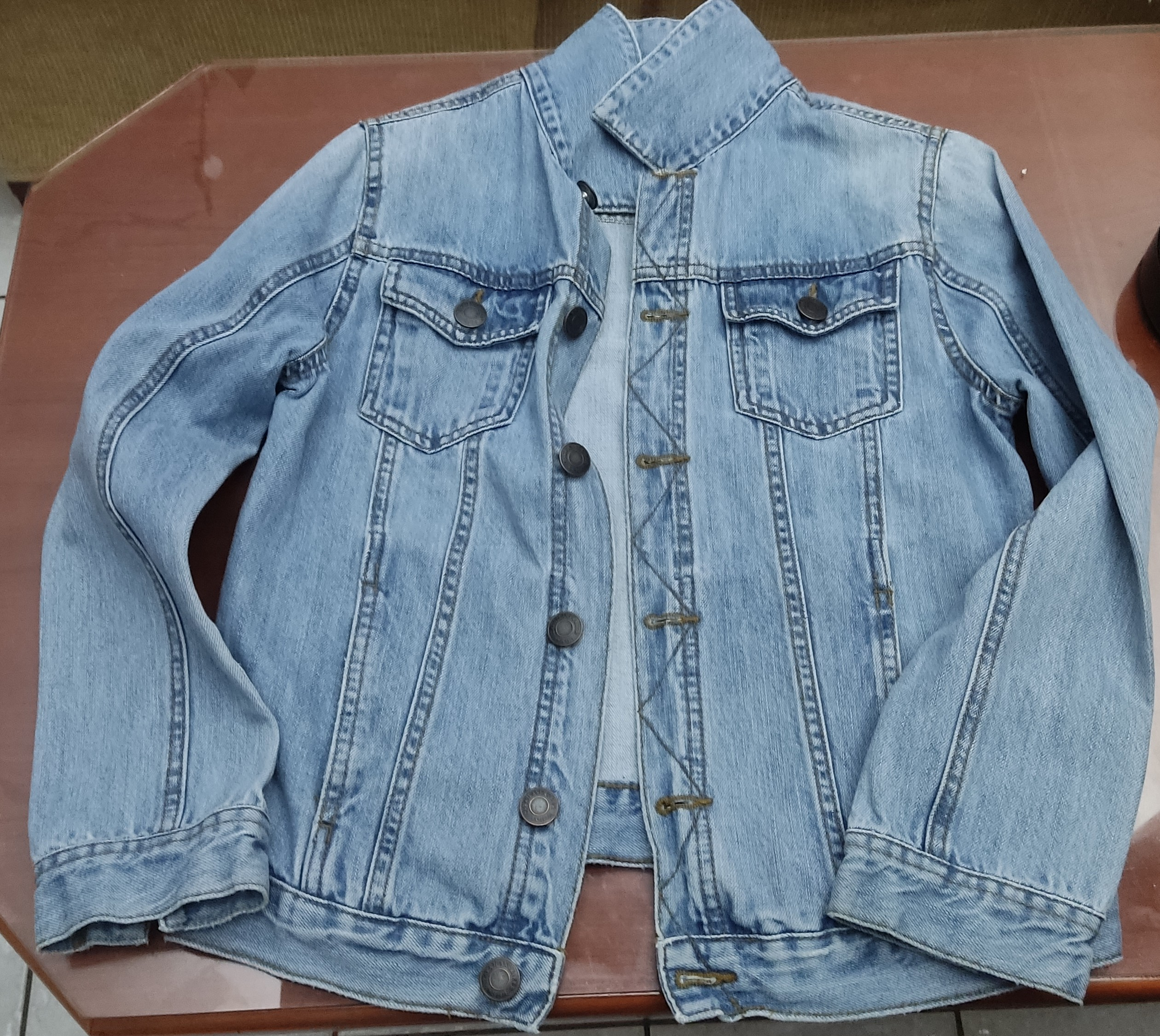
A denim "trucker" jacket, introduced in the early 20th century, and since the 1960s, one of the most well-known products of denim cotton.

Denim is frequently used for a wide array of consumer products, including:

- Clothing
  - Aprons
  - Boots and athletic shoes
  - Capri pants
  - Cloth face mask
  - Dresses
  - Hats
  - Jackets
  - Jeans
  - Jeggings
  - Overalls
  - Shirts
  - Shorts
  - Skirts
  - Sneakers
  - Suits
- Accessories
  - Belts
  - Handbags (purses)
  - Tote bags
  - Wallets
- Furniture
  - Bean bag chairs
  - Lampshades
  - Upholstery

=== Art ===
Denim has been a medium for many artists. At least one artist, Ian Berry, uses old or recycled denim, exclusively in crafting his portraits and other scenes.

=== Heavy Metal Subculture ===
Denim has evolved from workwear to a significant cultural symbol in various subcultures. In the Heavy Metal world, denim is not just a fabric, but a cultural biography of every metal fan. The denim cultural biography is known as Battle Jacket or Kutte. Often, sleeveless denim jacket or vest is the foundation of battle jacket.

In the process of creating a battle jacket, most metal fans will sew patches onto their denim jacket or vest surface by themselves. Typically, these patches feature bands' logos, album art, or other symbolic patterns. Additionally, the core patch, which is usually metal fan's most significant or favorite band, is attached to the back. These embroidered patches represent every metal fan's musical tastes and the deep passion for the music.

According to O'Hagan (2021), these garments are a "multimodal biography". Every memory in the metal fan's life is recorded by each patch. From normal denim to a unique art, this process shows the most distinctive culture within the heavy metal world and has significantly expanded denim culture. Furthermore, the jacket is a "social lubricant," facilitating interaction and a sense of collective belonging among fans.

== Worldwide market ==
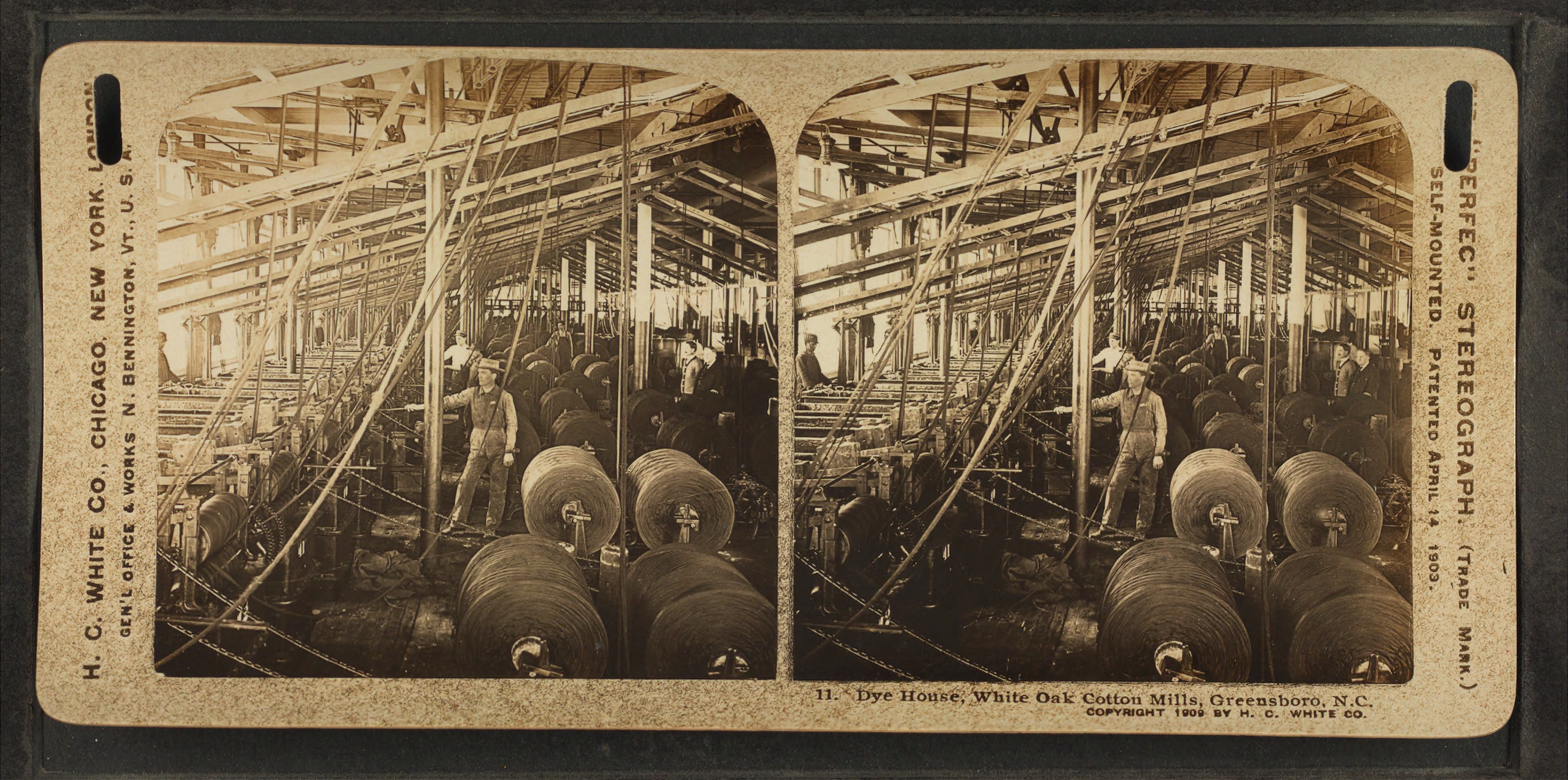
The dyehouse at the White Oak Cotton Mill, in Greensboro, North Carolina. The Cone Mills Corporation, which owned the mill, was formerly the world's largest maker of denim.

In 2020, the worldwide denim market equaled US$57.3 billion, with demand growing by 5.8% and supply growing by 8% annually. Over 50% of denim is produced in Asia, most of it in China, India, Turkey, Pakistan, and Bangladesh.

Globally, the denim industry is expected to grow at a CAGR of over 4.8% from 2022 to 2026, with the market value expected to increase from $57.3 billion to $76.1 billion.

One of the icons of raw denim fashion, Roy Slaper, was particularly renowned in Japan.

== Gallery ==
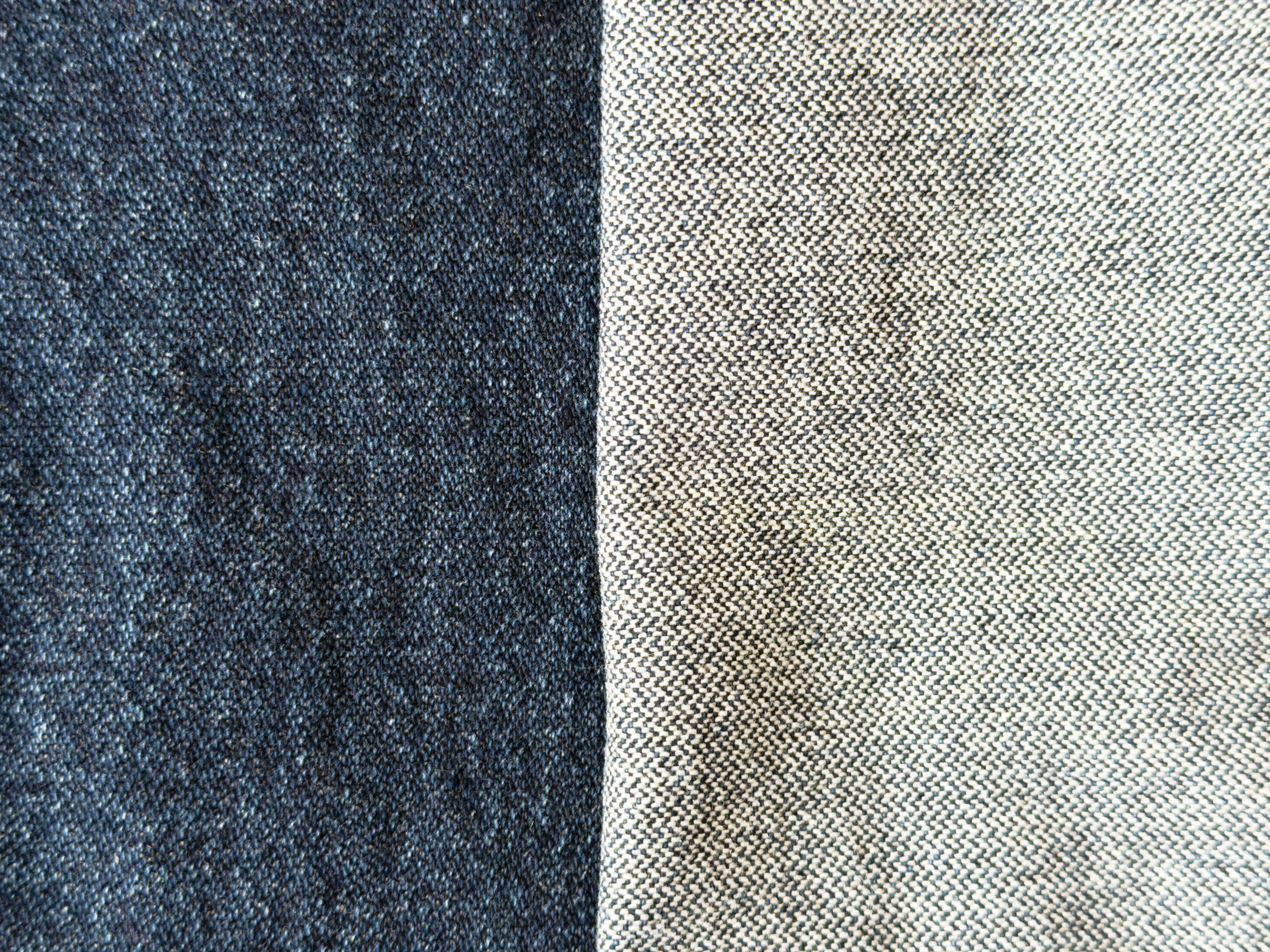
broken twill denim texture

== See also ==
- Chambray
- Denim Day
- Dungaree
- Gabardine
- Lee National Denim Day
- Western fashion
- List of denim jeans brands
