= Jeggings =

Leggings designed to resemble denim

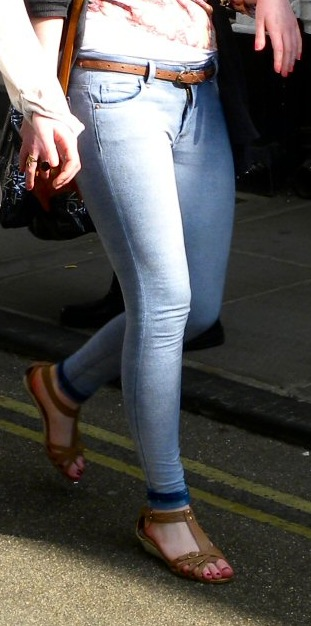
A woman wearing jeggings.

Jeggings (/ˈdʒɛɡɪŋz/) are leggings that are made to look like skin-tight denim jeans. The word is a portmanteau of the words jeans and leggings.

== Wear ==
Jeggings were brought on by the resurgence in style of skinny jeans in the late 2000s, when a higher demand for a tighter style of pants came about. Since jeggings are typically made of a cotton/spandex blend (cotton being the primary fiber in most denim, a kind of serge), they are often worn on their own as opposed to under a skirt or dress. Some jeggings have front fastenings while others just have an elastic waistband and no pockets.

With respect to material, jeggings fall into two main categories:

1. Jeggings that are legging material, i.e. a knit, made to look like denim with fake pockets and belt loops
2. Jeggings that are a true cross between denim and legging material. "Denim jeggings" are essentially a denim fabric with the elasticity of a legging, due to a higher proportion of spandex in the fiber content.

The latter are more similar to skinny jeans than the former. Some designers call "denim jeggings" pull-on jeans rather than jeggings.

== Fashion trend ==
Jeggings entered the fitness world by the early 2010s, and were among the most popular clothing items of 2010. Many opt to wear jeggings in order to give the legging feel as well as the jean appearance.

== Popular culture ==
In 2011, "jeggings" was given an entry in the twelfth edition of the Concise Oxford English Dictionary. Conan O'Brien wore a pair during the taping of Conan on 2 December 2010, the night after admitting his (tongue-in-cheek) love for jeggings to Project Runway's Tim Gunn.
