= Roy Slaper =

American fashion designer specializing in men's denim (1971-2026)

Roy Slaper (December 22, 1971–July 2026) was an American brand founder, menswear designer, and eponym of Roy Denim. Using vintage sewing machines and looms with a focus on mechanics, he became an international icon of raw denim fashion, peaking in the 2010s. His work was particularly popular in Japan. He retired and sold his machines in 2021.
