= Dungaree (fabric) =

Twill fabric used for overalls

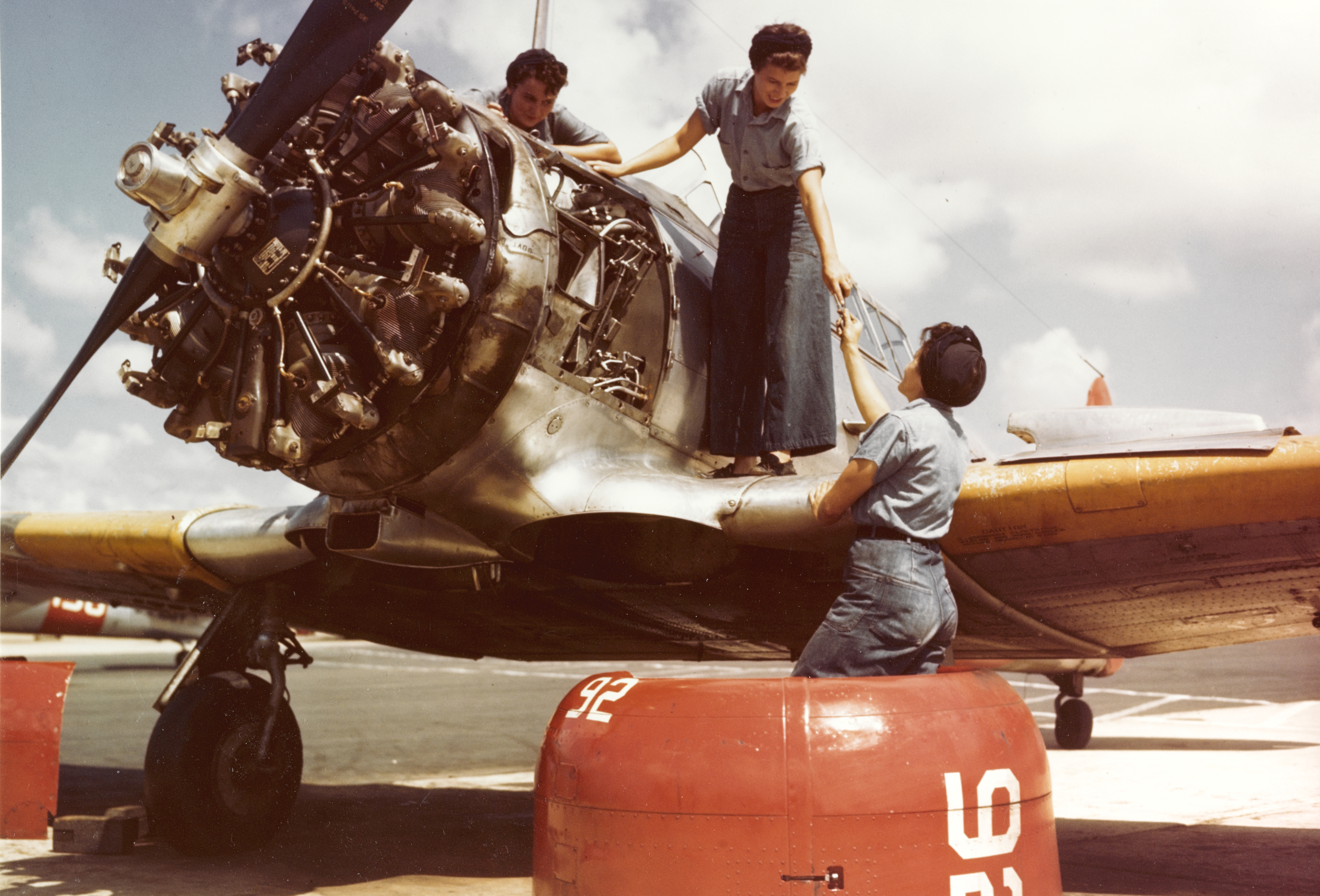
Dungaree is typically associated with working clothes, here seen on mechanics working on a North American T-6 Texan trainer during the Second World War

Dungaree fabric (used in English since 1605–15 "Dongeryus", from the Marathi dongrī) is a historical term for an Indian coarse thick calico cloth. The word is possibly derived from Dongri, a dockside village near Mumbai. Cotton twill with indigo-dyed warp thread is now more commonly referred to as denim.

In American English, the term is used for hard-wearing work trousers made from such fabric and in British English for bib overalls in various fabrics, either for casual or work use. By 1891 English author Rudyard Kipling was using the word to refer to a kind of garment (in the plural) as well as a fabric.

== Dungaree vs. denim ==
Although dungaree now also refers to denim, it is unclear whether traditional dungaree was a precursor to denim. In the late 17th century, most dungaree produced was either washed and bleached, or dyed after weaving. Denim refers to cotton twill which may be warp dyed, undyed, or dyed after weaving. Denim may be 2×1 or 3×1 twill. It is unclear what types of dungaree fabric were available traditionally.

== Derivatives ==
In the United States, the mill at Shady Lea, North Kingstown, Rhode Island, was built in the late 1820s by Esbon Sanford to manufacture a cotton-wool blend twill fabric called Kentucky Jean, resembling a cross between burlap and the dungaree fabric of today.
