= Chuck Roaste =

Japanese-born fashion designer

Toshi Hosogai (born c. 1956), best known as Chuck Roaste, is a Japanese-born fashion designer. Beginning his career as a journalist for the Japanese culture magazine Studio Voice, Hosogai adopted the name "Chuck Roaste," derived from a nickname given to him by pop artist Andy Warhol in 1980.

Hosogai later established the Chuck Roaste fashion label, operating boutiques in Tokyo and New York City. He is best known for developing innovative denim garments and received a United States utility patent in 2001 for reversible jeans construction. His designs were presented at New York Fashion Week and sold through specialty retailers.

== Early life and career ==
Toshi Hosogai was born in Japan and began his career as a journalist for the Japanese culture magazine Studio Voice. During his second visit to New York City at the age of 24, Hosogai encountered Pop artist Andy Warhol at his studio, the Factory, where he interviewed him on May 22, 1980. In his diary, Warhol mentioned the meeting: "A tall skinny Japanese boy came to interview me, and he was cute, he was so nervous, just shaking, he said he was meeting the star of his life. He's from Studio Voice, the Japanese Interview. He brought me a T-shirt."

Hosogai met Warhol again at a lunch on June 2, 1980, which Warhol recalled in his diary: "The Japanese guy from Studio Voice was there, and he really is just crazy about me. He wanted me to give him a new name, so I gave him 'Chuck Roast.'" "He wrote it down and said, this is your visa for New York," Hosogai later recalled. "I'll never forget that day. He was fabulous."

== Chuck Roaste apparel ==
Hosogai subsequently modified the name to "Chuck Roaste," which he adopted professionally. Viewing the name as both a personal honor and a marketable identity, Hosogai opened a high-end boutique in Tokyo under the Chuck Roaste name later in 1980. He operated the store for approximately a decade while also developing private-label apparel bearing the brand name.

In 1990, Hosogai sold the boutique to a Japanese conglomerate, obtained a United States green card, and relocated to New York City. Several years later, he opened the Blue Brew boutique in Manhattan's SoHo neighborhood, though the business closed in 1995 after roughly two years of operation.

In 1996, Hosogai regained the rights to the Chuck Roaste name and began developing a new apparel line under the label. In 1998, he produced his first pair of reversible jeans and subsequently sought legal protection for the design. Before the patent was granted, Hosogai also took legal steps to protect the design from imitation, since inventions not yet patented lacked federal protection if they entered the public domain. In December 1999, he filed a lawsuit against Paul Davril Inc., a licensee of Kenneth Cole, alleging that the company had infringed upon his reversible jeans designs by producing a similar style.

In May 1999, Hosogai opened a boutique at 49 Clinton Street on the Lower East Side. In addition to his reversible jeans, the store sold fitted denim jackets, sleeveless denim jackets, T-shirts featuring graphics by local artists, hats made from upholstery fabric, and canvas tote bags. Hosogai also wholesaled his premium denim line to specialty retailers.

In February 2000, Chuck Roaste CR Jeans debuted at New York Fashion Week during the 12th Girls Rule show, a biannual presentation showcasing a cross-section of the junior apparel market. Hosogai introduced a new collection featuring reversible denim shirts, skirts, dresses, and pants. The line also included hand-embroidered jackets, peasant-style denim shirts, and garments accented with fringe and colored stitching.

After years of development and legal effort, Hosogai secured a United States utility patent for his reversible jeans construction concept in 2001. In an interview with Women's Wear Daily that year, he stated: "Many people have told me that clothes cannot be patented. But I'm not talking about design things. I'm talking about function, utility. It's a completely different way of thinking." Sold under the Chuck Roaste label, the patented design covered functional elements including reversible pockets, fly construction, seams, fasteners, and other structural details developed to allow the jeans to be worn inside out. Hosogai described the project as motivated by his interest in technical challenges, which he cited as the reason he began developing reversible jeans.

For Spring 2004, Hosogai shifted the Chuck Roaste jeans line toward more conventional designs, with about 85 percent of the assortment consisting of traditional single-sided denim rather than his patented reversible styles. He described the change as a concession to market realities, noting that while he still believed in reversible jeans, "It's not the way of the American market." He also emphasized that the concept required strong in-store explanation to consumers to succeed. Wholesale prices ranged from $50 to $89, reflecting a reduction from previous seasons.

Although the United States Patent and Trademark Office recognized the design as a unique innovation, Hosogai acknowledged that the commercial success of the concept was more limited. In 2004, he stated: "I never had the large numbers," adding that the line typically generated between $500,000 and $800,000 in seasonal sales.

In 2004, Hosogai signed a licensing agreement with Azteca Production International Inc. granting the company rights to manufacture and sell Chuck Roaste-branded jeans, as well as rights related to his patented reversible denim technology. The company was led by apparel executive Paul Guez. Hosogai said the deal would streamline production, replacing a process that required garments to be cut and sewn in New York City, shipped to California for washing, and returned for distribution. He added that production could now be centralized "under one roof," and expressed optimism that the partnership would significantly increase sales.
