= List of denim jeans brands =

Jeans are a type of trousers. Below is a list of denim jeans brands.

== List ==
=== Global and mass-market denim brands ===
- 7 for All Mankind
- Aeropostale
- Abercrombie & Fitch
- American Eagle Outfitters
- Arizona Jean Co.
- Bershka
- Buffalo David Bitton
- Bugle Boy
- Calvin Klein (fashion house)
- Diesel (company)
- Gap Inc.
- Guess (clothing)
- H&M
- Hollister Co.
- Jack & Jones
- Lee (jeans)
- Levi Strauss & Co.
- Lucky Brand Jeans
- Mavi Jeans
- Miss Sixty
- Mossimo
- Old Navy
- Pepe Jeans
- Pull&Bear
- Superdry
- Tommy Hilfiger
- True Religion (clothing brand)
- Uniqlo
- Wrangler (jeans)
- YMI Jeans
- Zara

=== Premium and contemporary denim brands ===
- AG Jeans
- Buck Mason
- DL1961
- Frame (fashion brand)
- Hudson Jeans
- J Brand
- Khaite
- Nudie Jeans
- Prps
- Rag & Bone

=== Heritage, raw, and selvedge denim brands ===
- 3sixteen
- Brutus Jeans
- Imogene + Willie

=== Japanese denim brands ===
- Big John
- Edwin (company)
- Evisu
- Kapital (fashion brand)
- Momotaro Jeans

=== Sustainable and ethical denim brands ===
- Armedangels
- Everlane
- MUD Jeans
- Outland Denim

=== Direct-to-consumer and emerging denim brands ===
- AYR (brand)
- DSTLD
- Good American
- Ksubi

=== International and regional denim brands ===
- Brittania Sportswear Ltd
- Devergo
- Gas Jeans
- Gitano Group Inc.
- Gloria Vanderbilt
- Great Western Garment Co.
- House of Deréon
- JNCO
- Jordache
- Just Group
- L.E.I.
- London Denim
- Mih jeans
- Mudd Jeans
- Noko Jeans
- Sergio Valente
- Silver Jeans Co.
- Texas Jeans USA
- Tiffosi
- Toughskins

=== Workwear and utility denim brands ===
- Carhartt
- Dickies
