= Japanese denim =

Denim production and jeans culture in Japan

Kojima Jeans Street in Ajino, Kojima, Kurashiki, Okayama Prefecture

Japanese denim refers to denim fabric produced in Japan and, more broadly, to Japanese-made jeans and the manufacturing and fashion culture surrounding them. Since the 1990s, Japanese denim has acquired an international reputation, particularly in the premium raw- and selvedge-denim market, for shuttle loom fabrics, attention to construction details, and distinctive fading characteristics. Selvedge denim represents only one part of Japanese denim production; Kaihara, for example, uses both older shuttle looms and modern weaving machinery for different types of fabric.

The principal manufacturing cluster lies in western Japan, particularly in the Sanbi textile region, an industrial area extending across southern Okayama Prefecture and eastern Hiroshima Prefecture along the Seto Inland Sea. Firms there developed a division of labor covering spinning, indigo dyeing, weaving, sewing, garment washing, finishing, product planning, and sales. Kojima, now a coastal district of Kurashiki, became especially associated with jeans manufacture, while Ibara and eastern Hiroshima developed as important centers of denim-fabric production.

American jeans entered Japan after World War II, and Japanese companies began sewing jeans from imported denim during the 1960s. Production of American-style denim fabric in Japan developed during the 1970s. Jeans also became established as everyday casual clothing during the late 1960s and 1970s. A vintage-inspired jeans movement emerged with brands founded from 1979 onward and developed into a broader replica-jeans boom during the late 1980s and 1990s.

== History ==
=== Textile background and postwar adoption ===
The Sanbi region had a developed cotton-textile industry long before jeans were manufactured there. In Kurashiki, cotton cultivation expanded on reclaimed land during the Edo period (1603–1868). Cotton was used for products including sanada himo (narrow woven cotton cord), heavy Kokura cloth, canvas, and tabi split-toe footwear. With the spread of Western-style clothing, local manufacturers increasingly produced school uniforms and workwear, developing experience in weaving and sewing heavy fabrics. These manufacturing skills later formed part of the industrial base used for denim garments.

Ibara also developed a tradition of cotton cultivation and indigo-dyed heavy cloth. From the Meiji period (1868–1912), local mills produced a heavy cotton textile known as Bitchū Kokura cloth, including a type called urajiro ("white back"), whose face was indigo-colored while the reverse appeared white.

After World War II, American-made second-hand jeans entered Japan through military-surplus and other channels. Jeans remained comparatively expensive and scarce in the late 1940s and early 1950s, but the easing of restrictions on clothing imports in 1956 expanded their availability. By the late 1950s, Japanese manufacturers were also producing lightweight indigo five-pocket trousers, although these differed from the heavy American-style denim jeans that later became the model for Japanese manufacturers.

=== Early Japanese-made jeans ===
Several companies and local histories make differing claims concerning the earliest jeans manufactured in Japan.

Eight-G's company history states that Takahata Sewing began making a product called Corn Popper in 1955 using a fabric described as shiro-ura ("white back"), and that in 1960 it produced and marketed Eight-G as Japan's first domestically made jeans. A later historical review concluded that the material called shiro-ura was probably not equivalent to the heavy American-style denim then being imported into Japan.

Edwin states that it began importing denim from overseas and sewing jeans in Japan in 1961, applying the EDWIN label to the finished product, and describes this as the birth of Japanese-made jeans. A 2015 historical review questioned whether all of the dates in Edwin's early-1960s chronology could be accepted without additional evidence, citing the state of denim imports and testimony from people associated with competing firms.

Textile-material imports were liberalized in 1963, after which Tokyo-based importer Oishi Trading began importing denim from the American company Canton Mills. Oishi marketed CANTON-brand jeans made from the imported cloth in 1963; a later history identifies CANTON as a likely candidate for the earliest full-fledged American-style jeans made in Japan.

In 1964, Oishi Trading reached an agreement with Maruo Hifuku ("Maruo Clothing"), a Kojima manufacturer later known as Big John, and Maruo began manufacturing CANTON jeans in 1965. The City of Kurashiki describes the 1965 production in Kojima as Japan's first domestically sewn jeans.

The imported denim was difficult to sew with equipment then commonly used in Japan. According to Kurashiki's historical account, Maruo imported sewing machines as well as thread, rivets, buttons, and zippers in order to manufacture the jeans. Maruo launched its own Big John brand in 1967.

=== Development of Japanese denim fabric ===
The manufacture of the denim fabric itself posed a separate technical problem. During the early 1960s, Japanese spinning and weaving facilities were oriented largely toward finer yarns and lighter cloth; one historical account states that locally produced heavy fabric generally reached only around 6 ounces, while American jeans commonly used denim of 12 ounces or more. Traditional Japanese indigo-dyeing methods also did not readily reproduce warp yarn dyed at the surface while retaining an undyed white core, a feature that produces the characteristic fading of American denim.

Claims concerning the earliest Japanese-made denim fabric also differ. The City of Ibara states that denim production began there around 1960 by applying techniques developed for local heavy cotton textiles. The city also associates this development with urajiro, a locally produced heavy fabric whose indigo face and white reverse resembled imported denim.

In eastern Hiroshima Prefecture, the business that later became Kaihara originated in a kasuri textile operation founded by Sukejirō Kaihara in 1893 in what is now Shin'ichi, Fukuyama. Kaihara Textile Mills Co. was incorporated in 1951 and renamed Kaihara Corporation in 1991.

The company moved toward denim after its export business in patterned sarong cloth declined sharply in the late 1960s. It states that its existing kasuri dyeing method colored yarn through to the core and therefore could not reproduce the fading of American jeans. Technology derived from an indigo-dyeing machine developed in 1954 was subsequently adapted to develop a rope-dyeing machine.

In 1970, Kaihara shipped indigo denim produced using cheese dyeing, a form of package dyeing. In the same year it completed its first continuous rope-dyeing machine and states that it became the first Japanese company to put rope-dyed denim on the market.

Kurabo Industries Ltd. (倉敷紡績) entered the denim business in 1970. In 1973 it installed spinning equipment for denim yarn and released KD-8, which the company describes as Japan's first domestically produced denim. A historical review dates the establishment of Japanese production of American-style rope-dyed denim by Kurabo and Kaihara to 1973.

That year Maruo Clothing used 14-ounce KD-8 to manufacture jeans. The City of Kurashiki describes the fabric as having been developed by Kurabo, Kaihara Textile Mills, and other companies, and calls the resulting jeans Japan's first pair made entirely from Japanese-produced denim.

=== Washing and higher-value production ===
Japanese jeans manufacturers also developed finishing processes performed after sewing. Garment washing was used to control shrinkage and produce changes in color, texture, and appearance, and became an important feature of the production system in the Sanbi region.

There are differing claims about the introduction of one-wash, or rinse-wash, processing. Edwin states that its 359BF jeans, released in 1963, were washed before sale to reduce stiffness and shrinkage and describes them as the world's first one-wash jeans. A Kurashiki heritage chronology instead dates the beginning of what it describes as the earliest form of jeans washing in the city to 1965.

Finishing methods diversified thereafter. Kurashiki's chronology records bleach and stone washing in the 1970s, chemical and enzyme washing in the 1980s, and sandblasting and shaving techniques in the 1990s.

Overproduction of school uniforms and later falling demand placed pressure on Kojima's established garment industry. Some manufacturers responded by applying their sewing, washing, dyeing, and finishing capabilities to higher-value denim casualwear. From the 1980s, some of these firms began manufacturing for high-end brands whose design operations were based in cities including Paris, Milan, London, and New York.

=== Spread and fashion culture ===
Jeans became increasingly common among Japanese youth during the late 1960s. One account of postwar clothing history links the spread of T-shirts and jeans to the 1968–1969 Japanese university protests, after which jeans were increasingly adopted by both men and women and became ordinary casual clothing across a wider range of age groups during the 1970s.

American clothing and lifestyle products also received increasing attention in youth media. Made in U.S.A. catalog, first published in 1975, and Popeye, launched in 1976, were among publications that presented American clothing, consumer goods, and lifestyles through specific products. Studies of these magazines describe a shift in Japanese representations of the United States from ideological models associated with the counterculture toward commodities and entertainment as objects of consumption.

Made in U.S.A. catalog featured the Levi's 501. A reader account cited in research on the publication recalled that the Tokyo department store Isetan began directly importing the 501 shortly after the catalog appeared and that the model rapidly became better known in Japan.

=== Vintage and replica-jeans culture ===
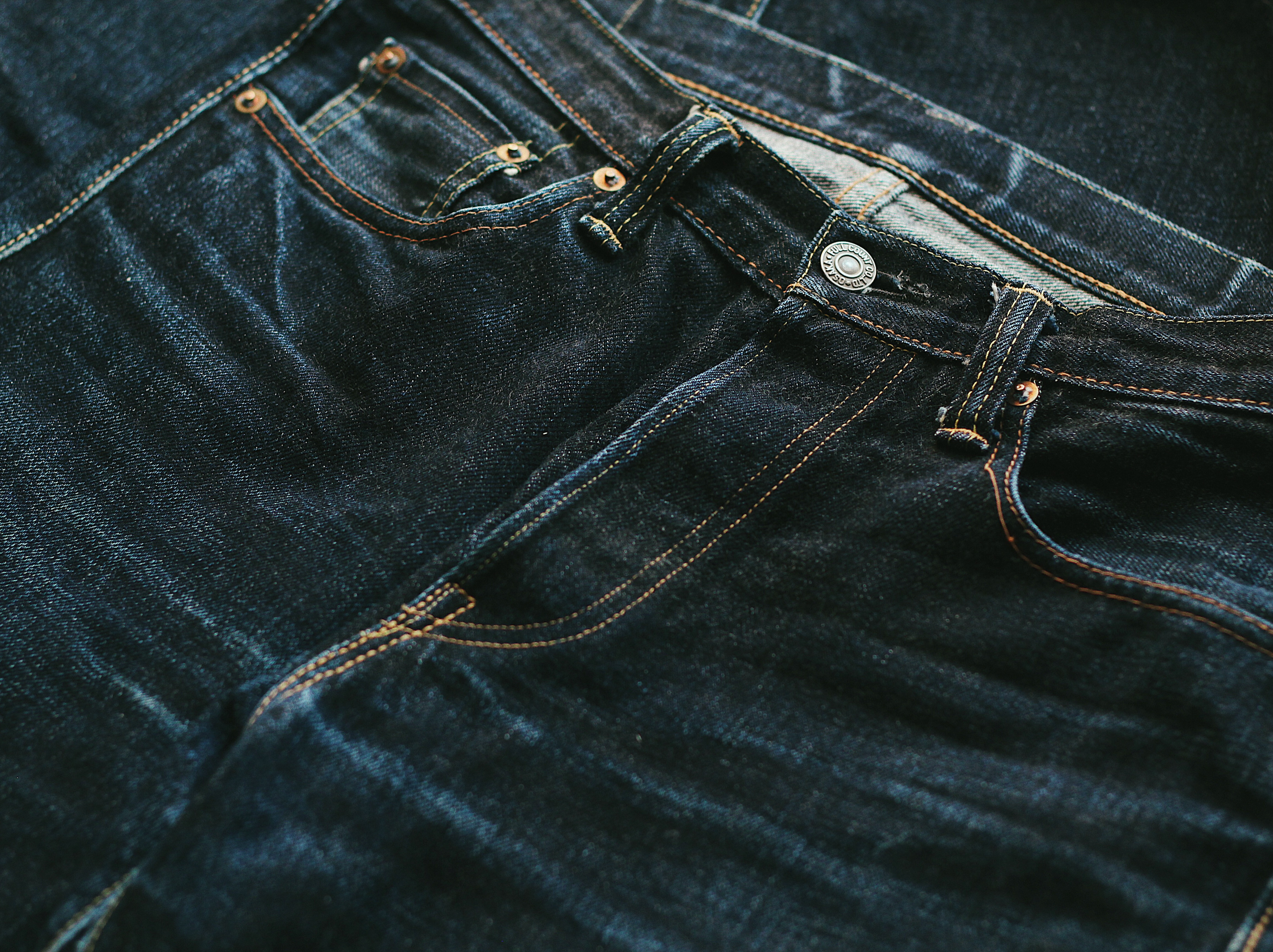
Honeycomb and whisker fading on Japanese selvedge denim by Full Count

From the late 1970s, Japanese companies began studying vintage American jeans and reproducing details such as fabric construction, stitching, rivets, buttons, and period-specific silhouettes. Studio D'Artisan was founded in 1979 and released its DO-1 jeans in 1986. Denime followed in 1988 and Evisu in 1991.

Full Count was founded in Osaka in 1993. Warehouse was founded in 1995. These five brands became collectively known in overseas denim media as the "Osaka Five" or "Osaka 5", although Denime was founded in nearby Kobe rather than Osaka.

The movement initially drew on mid-20th-century American jeans and placed renewed emphasis on features such as selvedge fabric woven on shuttle looms, un-sanforized cloth, hidden rivets, and period-specific sewing details. Replica jeans became a larger fashion niche during the 1990s and helped establish the later premium Japanese-denim market.

== Production regions and division of labor ==
The Sanbi region developed a production network in which separate firms specialized in spinning, dyeing, weaving, sewing, washing, finishing, product development, and distribution.

=== Kojima ===
Kojima is a coastal district of Kurashiki in southern Okayama Prefecture. Its earlier school-uniform and workwear industries provided a base of sewing and heavy-fabric skills, while later firms specialized in denim weaving, cutting, sewing, washing, dyeing, and finishing. Some companies also became subcontract manufacturers for Japanese and overseas premium fashion brands.

=== Ibara ===
Ibara, in southwestern Okayama Prefecture, is particularly associated with denim weaving. "Ibara Denim", defined as denim fabric woven within the city, was registered in Japan as a regional collective trademark in 2019.

=== Eastern Hiroshima ===
The eastern Hiroshima part of the Sanbi region developed from older textile industries including Bingo kasuri, a regional form of resist-dyed cotton textile. Kaihara expanded from dyeing into weaving, finishing, and spinning, completing an integrated spinning–dyeing–weaving–finishing production system in 1991.

A 2023 study of the denim and jeans industry in Fukuyama found a pronounced shortage of workers in sewing operations and identified the transfer of skills and technical knowledge to younger workers as an industry concern.

== Manufacturing techniques ==
Denim is a warp-faced twill fabric, most commonly using indigo-dyed warp yarns and undyed weft yarns. In many jeans fabrics the indigo colors only the outer layers of the warp yarn, leaving an undyed white core. Abrasion during wear gradually exposes the white center and produces characteristic fading.

=== Dyeing ===
Rope dyeing became particularly important in Japanese production of American-style denim. Hundreds of warp yarns are grouped into rope-like bundles and repeatedly passed through indigo dye and exposed to air for oxidation. Limiting penetration of the indigo helps retain the undyed core needed for high-contrast fading.

Kaihara's company history distinguishes rope dyeing from cheese dyeing, a form of package dyeing. It first shipped cheese-dyed indigo denim in 1970 and completed its first rope-dyeing machine in the same year.

=== Weaving and selvedge ===
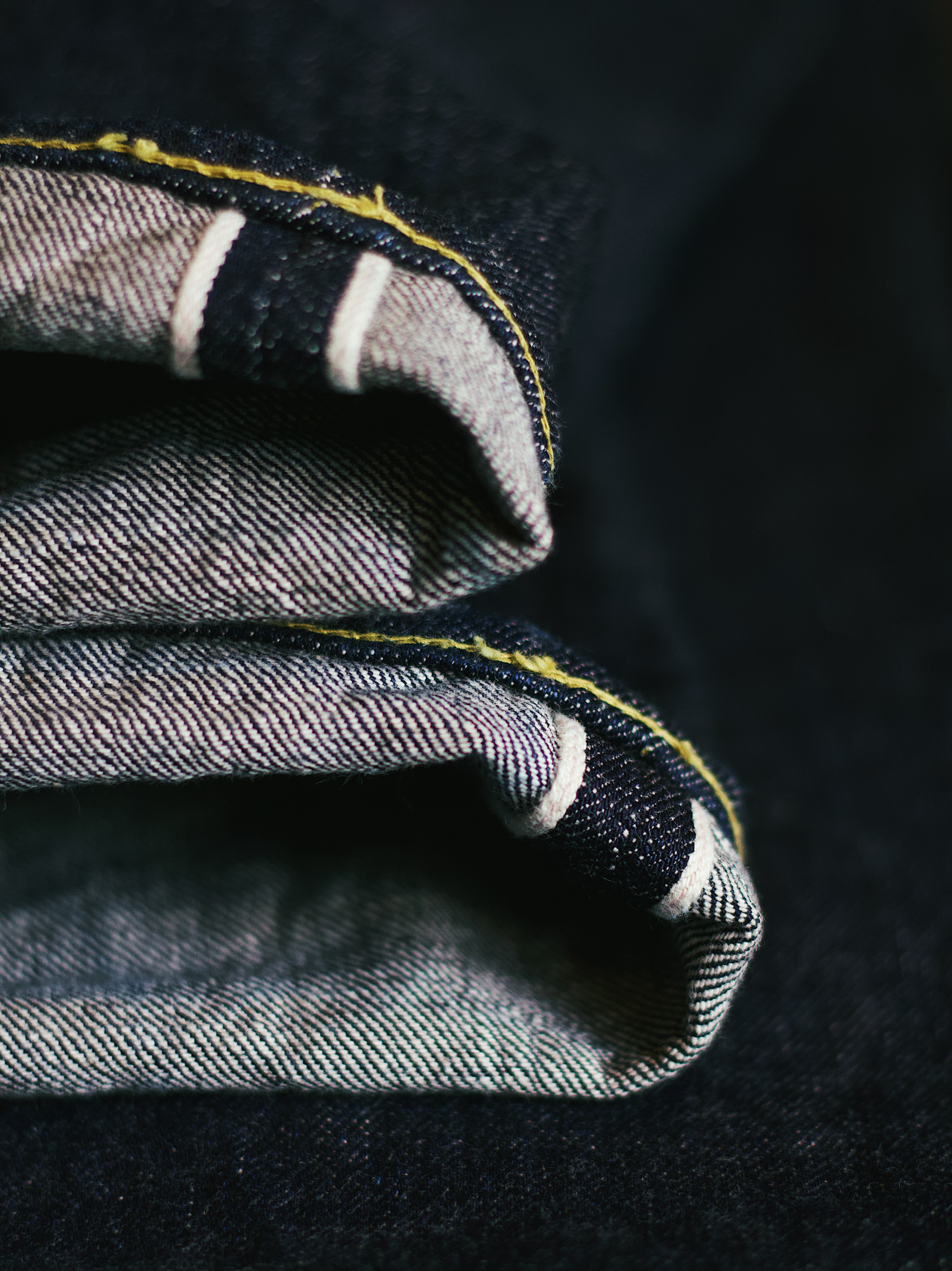
The self-finished edge, or selvedge, on a pair of Full Count Japanese selvedge jeans

Older shuttle looms weave relatively narrow fabric with a finished self-edge, or selvedge. Their slower operation can produce variations in texture that became valued in the premium and replica-jeans markets.

Selvedge denim represents only part of Japanese denim production. Kaihara, for example, uses older shuttle looms alongside projectile and high-speed rapier looms, selecting different machinery according to fabric weight and specification.

Kaihara's corporate history records that in 1974 Denny Co., a joint venture between Unitika and Kaihara Textile Mills, began operations with 68 Toyoda GU8 looms. The Associated Press has also reported the continued use of vintage Toyoda shuttle looms in denim production at Momotaro Jeans, noting that the loom manufacturer was a predecessor of the company that became Toyota.

=== Garment finishing ===
After sewing, jeans may undergo washing, bleaching, abrasion, enzyme treatment, or other finishing processes to stabilize shrinkage or alter their color and surface. Such finishing became a specialized part of the Japanese production network and was particularly developed in the Kojima area.

== International reputation and overseas market ==
Japanese denim developed a following outside Japan from the 1990s, particularly among enthusiasts of raw and selvedge denim. The premium market has associated Japanese products with small-batch fabrics, textured cloth, detailed reproductions of vintage jeans, and visible changes in color and wear over time.

The Associated Press reported in 2024 that Japanese jeans represented a small part of the global jeans market but had established a distinct niche associated with craftsmanship and collector interest.

Thomas Stege Bojer, founder of the denim website Denimhunters, linked Japanese brands' use of long-wearing raw denim that changes visibly with wear to the "slow clothing" movement. Emma McClendon, assistant professor of fashion studies at St. John's University, has argued that the Japanese industry has encouraged consumers to regard historical construction details and heritage as indicators of quality.

English-language fashion coverage has also highlighted other Japanese denim brands. The Guardian described Momotaro Jeans, Pure Blue Japan, and Studio D'Artisan as major Japanese denim brands in 2019. The Associated Press reported in 2024 that Momotaro Jeans, launched in 2006, received about 40 percent of its sales from outside Japan.

Historical accounts have also cautioned against presenting modern Japanese denim production as an unbroken continuation of much older Japanese indigo traditions: the manufacture of American-style denim and jeans in Japan is principally a postwar development.

== Regional branding and industrial tourism ==
In 2010, a section of the former commercial district in Ajino, Kojima, was developed as Kojima Jeans Street, where stores operated by local jeans manufacturers and related businesses are concentrated. In 2024, the Associated Press reported that the Kojima area contained about 40 jeans-related manufacturers, shops, and other businesses, and drew roughly 100,000 visitors annually according to the Japan National Tourism Organization.

Masataka Suzuki, president and chief operating officer of Japan Blue at the time of the AP report, cited the region's experience sewing heavy fabrics, including military garments and obi sashes, together with local cotton and indigo-dyeing traditions, as strengths of Kojima's denim industry.

In Ibara, the Ibara Denim Ordinance was enacted in 2021 to promote awareness and use of local denim. October 26 is recognized as "Denim Day" by the Japan Anniversary Association, and the ordinance encourages the wearing of denim products on that day.

== See also ==
- Denim
- Jeans
- Kasuri
- Japanese street fashion
- List of denim jeans brands
