= Kaihara Denim =

Japanese fabric mill in Fukuyama

Kaihara Denim (カイハラ) is a Japanese fabric mill in Fukuyama, Hiroshima. Originally founded as Marusu (㋜) in 1893 as an indigo kasuri producer, its name is written in katakana and refers to its founder, Kaihara Sukejiro (貝原助治郎), who established Kaihara Textile Mills Ltd. in 1951. In 1970, Kaihara developed a rope-dying machine that was among the first in Japan.

Kaihara produces about half of all Japanese denim, and exports to 30 countries and territories. Its denim is used by brands worldwide including Levi’s, Madewell, Buck Mason, Kenzo, A.P.C., Uniqlo, Edwin, Nudie Jeans, Freenote Cloth, Brave Star Selvage, and Tellason.

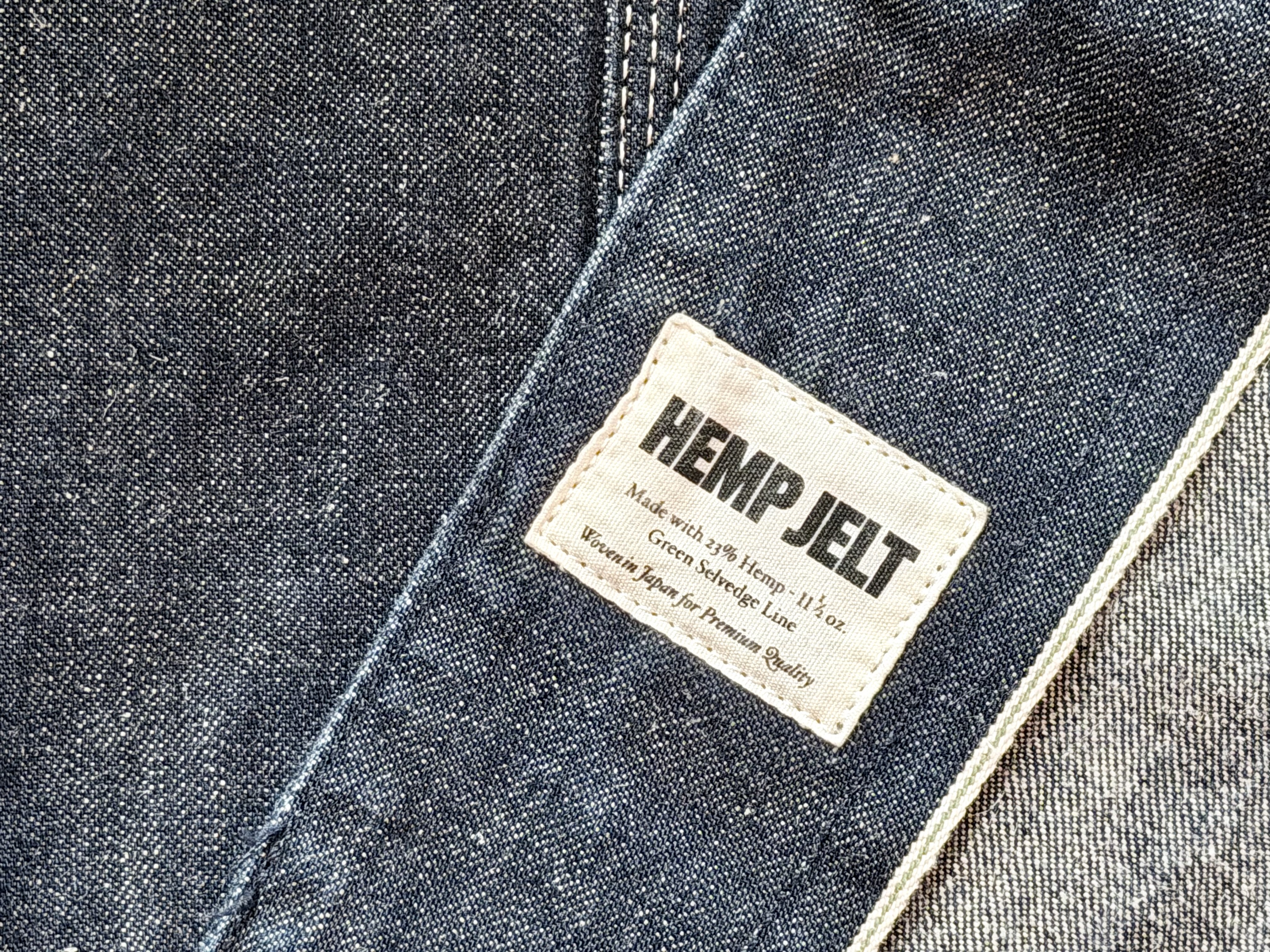
Lee 101 Loco Jacket made of Hemp Jelt by Kaihara Denim

== See also ==
- Momotaro Jeans
- Edwin
- Evisu
- Kapital
