= Danielle Bernstein =

American blogger, and social media influencer

- Born: May 28, 1992 (age 34); Great Neck, New York, U.S.
- Occupations: Lifestyle influencer and entrepreneur
- Website: weworewhat.com

Danielle Bernstein (born May 28, 1992) is an American fashion designer and the founder of the fashion blog and brand WeWoreWhat. She has collaborated with numerous brands and has launched her own fashion lines.

On multiple occasions, smaller brands and designers have said Bernstein copied their designs, which Bernstein and her lawyer deny.

== Early life and education ==
Bernstein graduated from William A. Shine Great Neck South High School in 2010, and briefly attended the University of Wisconsin–Madison, where she studied retail, and then transferred to the Fashion Institute of Technology in New York City. She dropped out of college to devote more time to her blog and turn it into a career.

Bernstein is Jewish and pro-Israel. In 2023, she signed the "No Hostage Left Behind", an open letter asking US President Joe Biden to ensure the release of hostages kidnapped by Hamas during the October 7 attacks.

== Career ==
=== 2011-2019 ===
In 2011, Bernstein started WeWoreWhat as a street-style photographer and college sophomore. The brand soon after transitioned into a personal-style blog, as her associated Instagram account gained popularity. In 2016, Bernstein launched a line of overalls called Second Skin Overalls, a direct-to-consumer brand. In 2017, at the age of 24, Danielle was placed on the Forbes 30 Under 30 list. In 2017, Bernstein designed a swimwear collaboration with Onia.

In 2019, she launched her own swimwear line with Onia as her partners. The same year, Bernstein teamed up with premium denim brand Joe's Jeans to design and release a new style of jeans, called the Danielle Jean.

In 2020, she made the decision to bring all her brands under one roof with the launch of Shop WeWoreWhat which included swim, denim, overalls, and most recently added active.

In the fall of 2019, Bernstein launched a tech company named Moe Assist, named after her intern-turned-assistant Moe Paretti. Moe Assist was the first product-management and payments tool geared for an influencer's workflow, created by an influencer. In 2022, the product was expanded as MOE 2.0 to provide tools for agents, brands, and influencers.

=== 2020 - present ===
In March 2020, Bernstein launched a namesake brand exclusively at Macy's called Danielle Bernstein. The debut spring collection was size-inclusive and $100. Along with the launch, Bernstein had a campaign shoot modeled by real-life followers, featuring women with different body shapes and types.

In May 2020, Bernstein published an autobiography, “This is Not a Fashion Story: Taking Chances, Breaking Rules, and Being a Boss in the Big City.” The book appeared on the New York Times Best Sellers list, however, the New York Times has since placed a "dagger" symbol alongside the book, indicating its listing includes suspicious "bulk purchases."

As a response to the COVID-19 global pandemic, Bernstein launched her charitable arm of WeWoreWhat called WeGaveWhat. The organization began as a platform to support other charities and highlight small businesses that are struggling during the pandemic. To date, she has raised over $200,000 and donated thousands of masks and meals to frontline workers. WeWoreWhat also teamed up with artist Sara Sidari to create a coloring book where 100% of the proceeds went directly to the River Fund, which brought in another $10,000.

In September 2020, Bernstein was diagnosed with the coronavirus. She previously had been socializing in the Hamptons without a mask, prompting criticism for failing to follow CDC guidelines.

== Controversies ==
=== Copying of designs ===
In multiple instances, Bernstein has been criticised for copying others' designs. In 2018, Bernstein received attention for copying the designs of various jewelry brands when she launched a series of products with Nordstrom. Foundrae, a specialized jewelry line, said that she had created nearly identical pieces after an earlier visit to the company's studio. Bernstein subsequently apologized in an Instagram post and withdrew the copied pieces from the collection.

In 2020, Bernstein announced a design for a cloth face mask with a chain. Fashion watchdog group Diet Prada, an Instagram account dedicated to highlighting instances of design copying, observed the mask was nearly identical to a patent-pending model created by a Latino brand called Second Wind. Bernstein had earlier requested free samples from the company. Bernstein denied that she had copied the design from Second Wind.

Days later, Bernstein posted to Instagram a photo of herself wearing what she claimed were a vintage pair of gym shorts, writing in the caption that she would be remaking the shorts to sell. The shorts were actually from an Etsy shop run by an Australian brand, Art Garments. After the Etsy seller published a receipt showing Bernstein had purchased the shorts from their store, Bernstein edited the Instagram caption to read, "CORRECTION - these are from Etsy and I totally thought they were vintage but they are made to order - someone on my team ordered them for me a while back - I will not be making them!"

In August 2020, a Brooklyn lingerie store alleged that Bernstein had copied their signature design, which they use on tissue packaging, and used it on swimwear and as print wallpaper.

In November 2020, Bernstein posted multiple Instagram photos previewing her upcoming holiday fashion line with Macy's. One of the pieces was a black patent leather skirt with a corset top. After receiving numerous messages noting the similarities, Grayscale designer Khala Whitney accused Bernstein of stealing her signature design: a black patent leather skirt with a corset top. Whitney shared screenshots of her messages with Bernstein from 2017. Bernstein inquired about the sizing of Grayscale's skirt and purchased it. Bernstein wore the skirt to Paris Fashion Week 2017 and highlighted it on YouTube and Instagram posts that have since been deleted. A screenshot of Bernstein wearing the skirt still circulates online. Bernstein and Macy's both decline to comment on the allegations.

In January 2021, two former Onia employees spoke out against Bernstein, claiming she brought in items on multiple instances and wanted her team to emulate them. These items include a piece of Dolce & Gabbana fabric and a cotton top from Are You Am I.

In March 2021, We Are Kin designer Ngoni Chikwenengere accused Bernstein of copying a silk dress from her clothing line. Chikwenengere provided screenshots of her messages with Bernstein from June 2020. Bernstein asked if she could be sent the dress as a gift. Chikwenengere was aware of the accusations against Bernstein, but knew Bernstein had 2.5 million followers and sent the dress in hopes she'd "see some business of the back of it." After seeing the accusations, Bernstein denied that she had copied the design.

=== Conflict with Poshmark reseller ===
In January 2020, a clothing reseller posted swimwear for sale on the Poshmark platform, not realizing it was unreleased samples of Bernstein's swimwear collaboration with Onia. The samples had been accidentally donated to Goodwill by a showroom employee, where the reseller purchased them to sell online.

Bernstein and the seller came to an agreement in which the reseller would remove the pieces from her store and sell them back to Bernstein. However, they argued over whether Bernstein had agreed to reimburse the costs of the swimwear as paid to Goodwill, or the seller's listed resale prices.

To avoid an unplanned release of her new line, Bernstein requested a stop-sale for the swimwear regarding its subsequent Poshmark shop re-listing. Following Bernstein's Instagram posts detailing the exchange, a fan create a Change.org petition to "Pledge to Boycott Poshmark if they Continue to Allow the Bullying of Small Business." Eventually, Bernstein and the reseller met in person and came to an agreement where the reseller was given merchandise from the previous collection to sell at a greater value.
