= Jeremy Liew =

Consumer venture capitalist investor (born 1971)

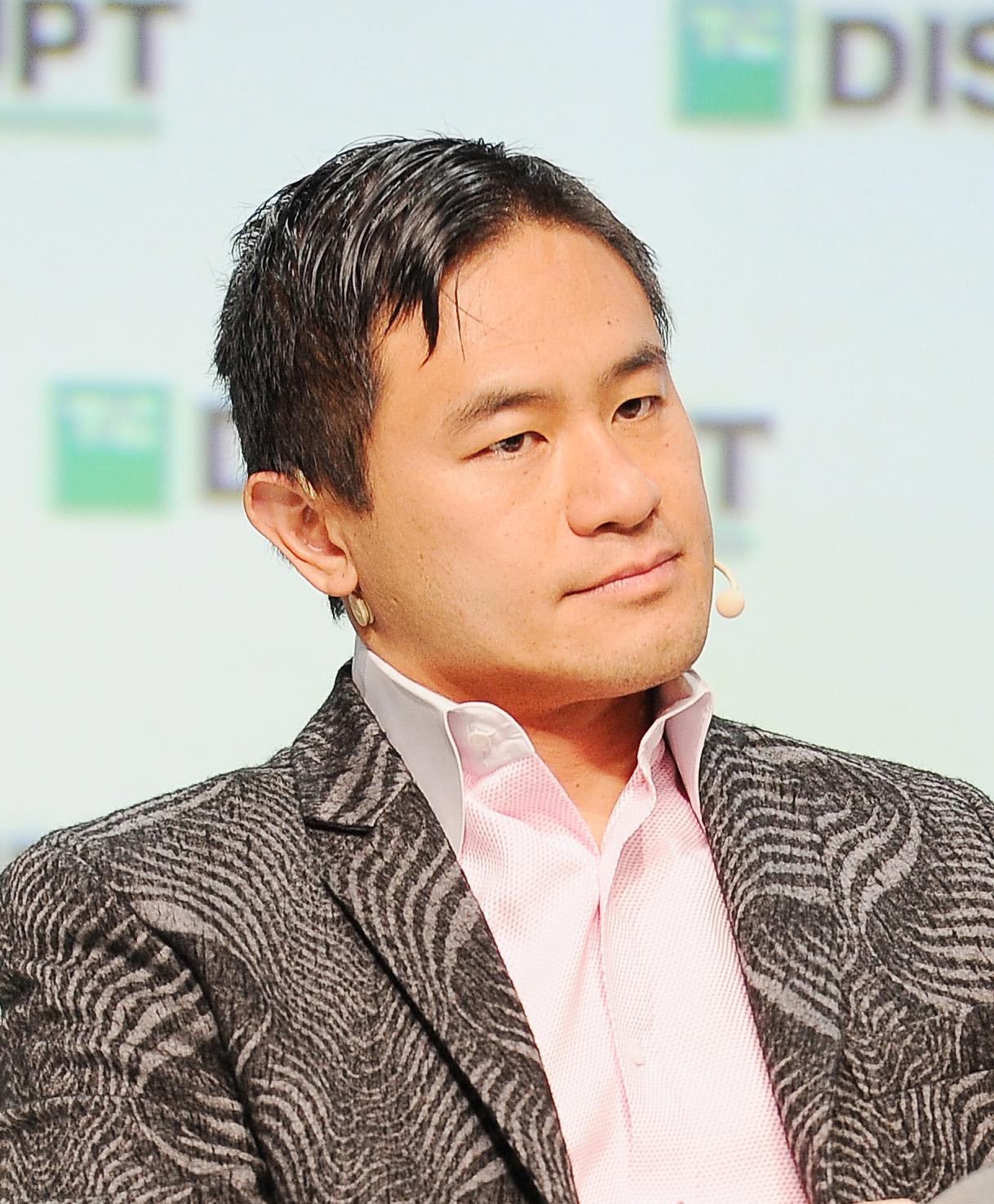
- Liew, 2018
- Born: 21 September 1971 (age 54); Singapore
- Education: Australian National University, BSc (Hons) ’93, BA (Hons) ’94; Stanford University, MBA 2000
- Occupation: Venture capitalist
- Board member of: Lightspeed; Affirm; The Honest Company; Bonobos; Blockchain.com; Presidio Knolls School
- Spouse: Ranee Lan
- Children: 2

Jeremy Liew (born 21 September 1971) is an Australian and American venture capitalist. A partner at Lightspeed Venture Partners, he is best known for making the initial investments in Snapchat and Affirm Holdings, Inc.

== Early life and education ==
Liew was born in Singapore and raised in Perth, Western Australia, where his parents still reside. In his senior year in high school, he represented Australia at the International Math Olympiad, where his teammate was future Fields Medalist Terry Tao.

He graduated from Australian National University with majors in linguistics and mathematics. Following graduation, he joined McKinsey as a business analyst, first working in Sydney and then briefly in Johannesburg. When one of his bosses started CitySearch, a mid-90s Internet pioneer, he moved to Los Angeles to join the company, working in sales and as manager of strategic planning.

In 1998, Liew went back to school, receiving an MBA from Stanford University in 2000. After graduation, he became vice president of strategic planning for USA Networks. He was involved in the transition to IAC, when it added companies such as Ticketmaster, Expedia and Hotel.com to its portfolio. He spent three years at AOL/Netscape as a corporate strategy executive and then entered the world of venture capital.

== Venture capital ==
In 2006, he joined venture capital firm Lightspeed Venture Partners as its first consumer specialist partner. At that time, Lightspeed was a small firm specializing in tech startups that were largely unknown outside of Silicon Valley. He noticed that startups that were used predominantly by young women were the most successful. He concluded that young women were the most likely carriers of the next popular cultural trend. To better understand this demographic, he looked outside of Silicon Valley to Los Angeles and New York to observe their consumer preferences, and develop a data driven approach to it.

In 2015, he noted that most of the boards he was on at the time were outside of Silicon Valley. This "follow the woman" thesis eventually led him to Snapchat, when in 2012 a partner told him that his daughter and her friends were obsessed with a new app he should look into. This led to a meeting with co-founder Evan Spiegel. He subsequently became the first investor in Snapchat.

The initial investment was $485,000, but in following rounds of investments, Lightspeed invested a total of $8.1 million into the app. This increased 250-fold in value to just under $2 billion at the time of Snapchat's IPO in 2017. Relations between Spiegel and Liew quickly deteriorated, as Spiegel felt he was taken advantage of with an onerous agreement for the initial seeding. This was later modified giving Lightspeed further shares at a discount.

Liew was the first and last investor to get special terms from the company. The success Liew brought Lightspeed with this investment and its IPO put the firm, having become a megafund, into the elite of the competitive V.C. world. The return on the IPO was greater than what the firm had raised in 2006. Liew was described as a major winner in all of this.

=== Investments ===
Liew was the first institutional investor and early member of the board of Bonobos, an upscale, e-commerce-driven apparel company that is now a subsidiary of Walmart. He was also a first investor and member of the board of Jessica Alba's firm, The Honest Company. He became a board member of Affirm, a financial lender of installment loans for consumers, after becoming the co-first institutional investor.

Jeremy Liew has been a featured speaker and moderator at conferences on video game monetization and has been called a "social game visionary." He has invested in a number of successful gaming companies, including Playdom (acquired by Disney), Serious Business (bought by Zynga), Kixeye, and Fan Controlled Football. He feels that user engagement is more important than design and is skeptical of Facebook games, referring to them as "highly deterministic and predictable." In 2023, Lightspeed hired Moritz Baier-Lentz as partner and head of gaming to build out and lead the firm's gaming practice.

He was an active investor in media and entertainment, with startups including Giphy (sold to Facebook), HQ, Cheddar Inc., and Beme (acquired by CNN). Successful exits have included Flixster (acquired by Warner Brothers), Kongregate (acquired by GameStop and later by Modern Times), and Slice (acquired by Rakuten). Recognizing that consumer trends begin with women and are best spread by word-of-mouth led Liew (who heard about it that way) to make a $7 million investment in Rothy's, a company making shoes from recycled plastic bottles and are recyclable themselves.

Liew was also involved in investments that turned out to be disappointing, including Zest AI (formerly ZestFinance), which started out as an online platform to consumers for point-of-sale subprime financing, using Artificial Intelligence to screen for suitable borrowers, now selling software. He invested in Living Social, which was a daily deals firm that enjoyed a meteoric rise, but ultimately failed. In 2016, it was acquired by Groupon for $0. Liew had invested in the first ridesharing company, named Sidecar. The startup lost out to Uber and Lyft, folding in 2015. Finally, another investment of his, Mic, a media and internet company catering to millennials, saw its value dwindle from hundreds of millions of dollars in 2017 to $5 million in November 2018, the value at which it was sold to Bustle. Liew ascribed the collapse to a change in Facebook algorithms.

=== Digital Currency ===
Liew is a proponent of cryptocurrency and has invested in businesses dealing with digital currency. He sees its value in times of political instability when citizens lose faith in their own currency. He co-led the first venture round for Blockchain.com. He favors bitcoin, as it is the most traded. He has predicted the price of bitcoin to be $500,000 by 2030.

Liew has been named to the Midas List, recognizing the best deal makers in V.C., multiple times. In August 2021, just shy of his 50th birthday, Liew announced he would step back from investing, though he would remain a partner at Lightspeed.

== Philanthropy ==
He is a founding trustee of the Presidio Knolls School, a Mandarin immersion PreK-8 school in San Francisco.

After the 2021 Atlanta murder of six Asian women, Liew joined with other tech investors to fund causes to fight anti-Asian hate.

Liew and his wife Ranee Lan were described as instrumental in raising the money for a playground at Sue Bierman Park, in San Francisco's Embarcadero, across from the Ferry Building. They have also been donors to and supporters of the construction of affordable housing in San Francisco.

== Personal life ==
Liew is married with two children. Liew has lived in the U.S. for twenty years and is a dual citizen of Australia and the U.S., but still considers himself an Aussie. Liew has been a student of the San Francisco Movement Practice.

== Political views ==
Liew rejects grievance politics from the Right or Left. He rejects the idea that America can go back to the good old days, either nationally or locally. After holding out on becoming a citizen for over a decade, he felt compelled to vote in 2016 and became a citizen. Although not a staunch Democrat, he has supported Democrats on a national level and voted for moderates in local elections.
