= Prps =

Denim brand

Prps Jeans logo

Prps is a New York-based luxury fresh denim brand that was established in 2002 by former Nike and Donna Karan designer, Donwan Harrell. The brand motto is "Bruised, never broken". Prps stands for “purpose”.

Distinguishing features of Prps jeans include a folded back pocket, the purple tab on the back pocket, different colored buttons on the fly, and purple line selvage. The brand is owned by O5 Apparel.

== Manufacturing ==
The denim used for the manufacture of the jeans is Japanese and Zimbabwean cotton. The Japanese manufacturer of the jeans uses looms from the 1960s similar to the type that were used to produce denim for Levi's. PRPS goods were originally all made in Japan. Due to increased demand, PRPS Goods and co. was created to offer Prps designs to a larger audience with garments made in China. Prps leather jackets are made in Italy.

== History ==
The designer launched a women's range in the US in September 2008, and in Europe and Asia in January 2009. The brand was subject to mockery online in 2017 when it launched $425 mud-splattered jeans. Prps appoointed Mattia Donadi its creative director in July 2018, several months after Donwan Harrell left the brand.

== Brand collection ==
- Prps Noir - Prices range from $650-$1500
- Prps - Prices range from $425-$695
- Prps Goods & Co. - Prices range from $185-$475. All tops are under the Goods & Co brand
