= Adriano Goldschmied =

Italian fashion designer (1943–2026)

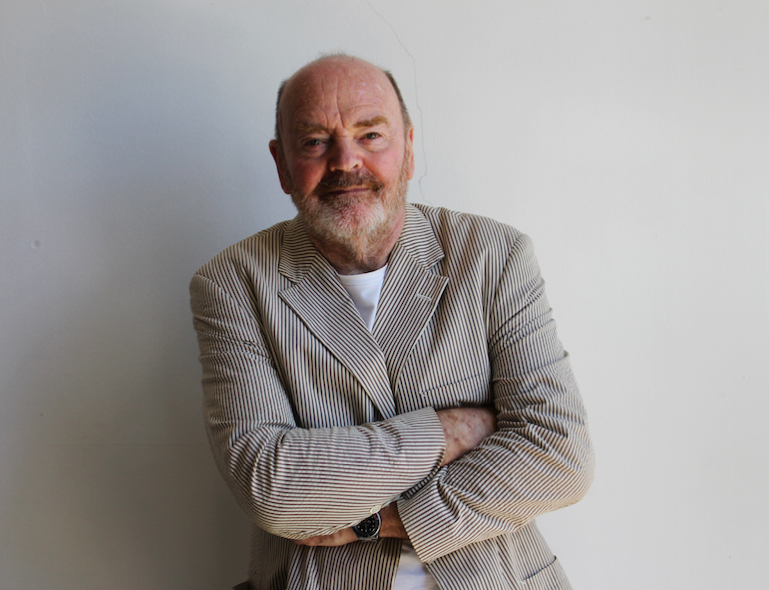
- Born: 29 November 1943; Italy
- Died: 5 April 2026 (aged 82); Castelfranco Veneto, Italy
- Occupation: Fashion designer

Adriano Goldschmied (29 November 1943 – 5 April 2026) was an Italian fashion designer and the originator of premium denim fashion. Known as "the godfather of denim", Goldschmied co-founded Diesel with Renzo Rosso and created more than 50 brands of jeans including Replay, Gap 1969, Agolde, Goldsign, and AG Adriano Goldschmied. Goldschmied was also the owner of House of Gold, a creative textile company with the purpose of bringing innovative fabrics to the market.

== Life and career ==
Goldschmied was born on 29 November 1943. His place of birth is reported variously as Vico Canavese or Ivrea in northwestern Italy, or Trieste, where he grew up. His parents were Sofia Goldschmied (née Arvanitis) and Livio Goldschmied. His family was Jewish. Their assets had been appropriated in 1942. Later, some of these assets were reconveyed to his family.

With initial dreams of becoming a competitive skier, he opened up a store in Cortina d'Ampezzo in 1970. This was a springboard for beginning his own denim company.

From 1996, he lived principally in Los Angeles and Milan. His daughter, Marta Goldschmied, has launched her own denim line, MADE GOLD Denim.

Adriano Goldschmied died from cancer in Castelfranco Veneto, near his home in Asolo, Italy, on 5 April 2026, at the age of 82.
