= Joe's Jeans =

American denim brand

Joe's Jeans is an American denim brand of WHP Global originally established in 2001 by creative director Joe Dahan in Los Angeles, California. The brand was founded to pioneer premium denim, focusing on a "fit-first" approach for various body types.

In 2013, Hudson Jeans was acquired for $97.6 million by Joe's Jeans. Hudson Jeans CEO Peter Kim remained as head of the company and became a member of the board of directors at Joe’s Jeans.

== See also ==
- List of denim jeans brands
