= WHP Global =

American brand management firm

WHP Global is an American brand management firm active in the retail industry. Its brands include Toys "R" Us, Babies "R" Us, Lotto Sport Italia, Vera Wang, Rag & Bone, G-Star, Joe's Jeans, Marc Jacobs, Express, Bonobos, Anne Klein, Joseph Abboud, Isaac Mizrahi, and Warners, Yehuda Shmidman is the founder, and CEO.

== History ==
In March 2020, WHP Global acquired the trademarks to the Joseph Abboud brand from Tailored Brands. In turn, Tailored Brands entered into a licensing agreement with WHP Global for the continuing rights to sell and rent Joseph Abboud apparel and selected accessories in the U.S. and Canada.

In August 2021, WHP Global announced that Toys "R" Us would open 400+ stores within Macy's starting in 2022.

In April 2023, Express and WHP Global agreed to acquire Bonobos from Walmart for $75 million. The deal was completed on May 25, 2023.

In April 2024, WHP Global completed the acquisition of rag & bone. The same month, WHP Global also sought to acquire Guess?, Inc. but the offer was declined.i

In December 2024, WHP Global acquired Vera Wang’s namesake brand.

== See also ==
- LVMH
- Kering
- Catalyst Brands
- Individualized Apparel Group
