= Momotaro Jeans =

Japanese clothing brand

Momotaro Jeans (Japanese: 桃太郎 ジーンズ) is a denim brand established in Kojima, Okayama in 2005 and named after the popular Japanese folk tale of Momotarō, a small boy born from a giant peach. Since 2025 its majority shareholder is Daidoh Ltd.

Momotaro garments can be recognized by two white lines across the back pockets of their jeans and jacket sleeves, pink selvedge lines, hidden rivets and custom buttons with Momotaro markings. The pink-line selvedge is placed in reference to their “peach” boy namesake (Japanese: 桃 momo).

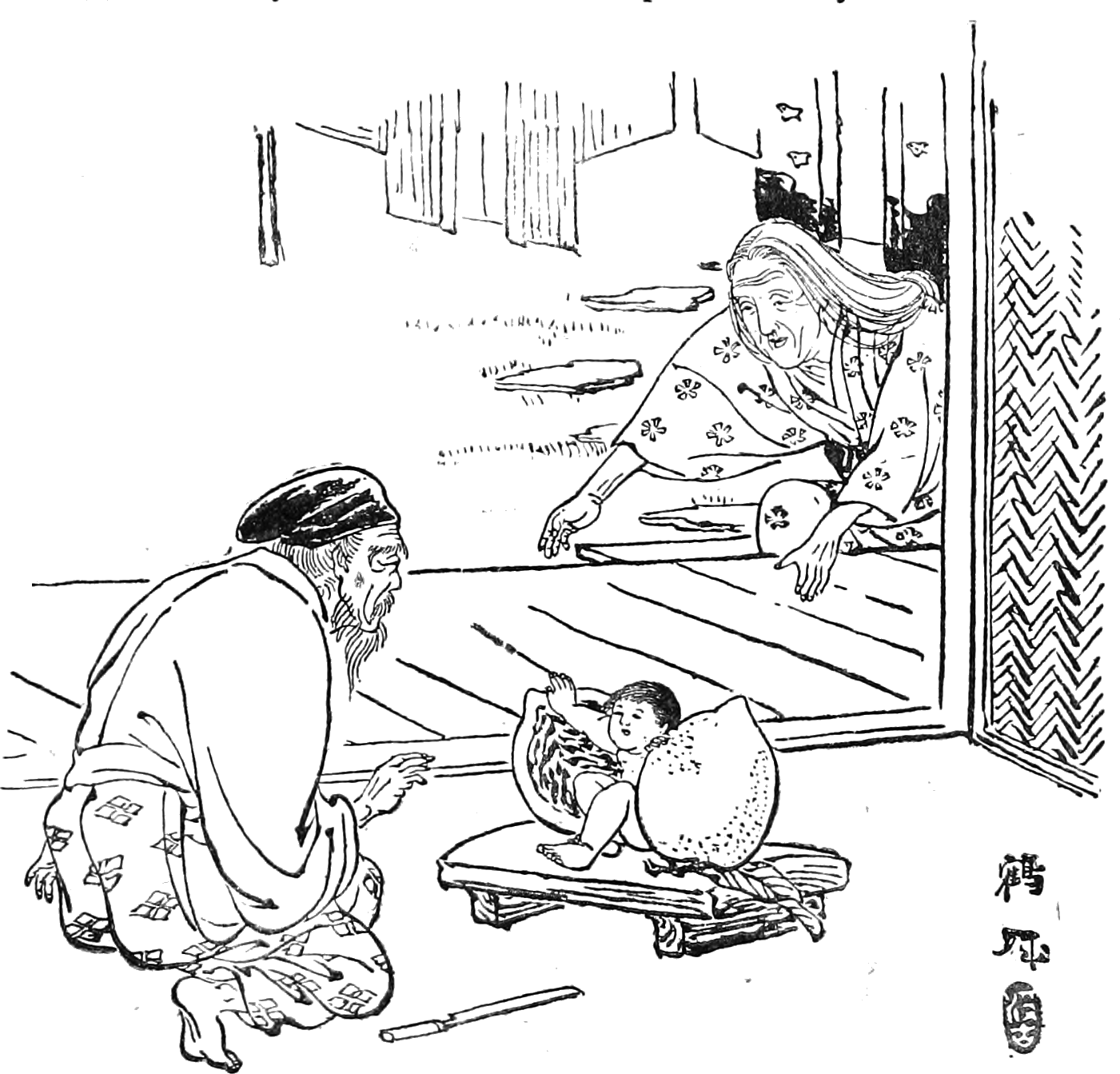
Momotarō coming out of a peach in Japanese folklore

The brand ethos is "Made by Hand Without Compromise," which includes the use of Zimbabwean cotton, known for its durability, quality, and unique denim fading characteristics. Momotaro Jeans come with a lifetime warranty.

Momotaro Jeans currently operates six stores in Japan (Aoyama, Kōenji, Kojima Ajino, Osaka, Okayama and Kyoto), as well as a global online storefront. Its parent company is Japan Blue.

== History ==
In 2020 the brand created a denim watch strap for the Oris x Momotaro Jeans Divers Sixty-Five.

Momotaro Jeans (as part of Japan Blue Group) was acquired by the Japanese private equity firm Karita & Company in January 2022, which took an 85% stake while the original founders kept a 15% minority stake.

In August 2025, the Japanese apparel and textile company Daidoh Ltd. acquired an 80% stake in Japan Blue Group for approximately ¥5.8 billion yen.

== See also ==
- Big John
- Edwin
- Evisu
- Kapital
- Kaihara Denim
