= Scott Morrison (designer) =

American denim fashion designer

- Born: Palm Springs, California
- Education: University of Washington
- Occupations: Designer, entrepreneur
- Years active: 1995 - present
- Known for: Pioneer of premium denim
- Title: Founder of Paper Denim & Cloth, Earnest Sewn, 3x1 Denim, Radmor Golf
- Board member of: Leo's Lighthouse Foundation
- Spouse: Gracileia (married 2009 - present)
- Children: 2

Scott Morrison is an American designer and entrepreneur. He was one of the first designers to help establish the premium denim market in the United States. and founded Paper Denim & Cloth, Earnest Sewn and 3x1. He also served as the CEO/Creative Director for Japanese designer clothing company Evisu.

Most recently, Morrison co-founded golf lifestyle brand Radmor.

== Early life and education ==
Morrison was born in Palm Springs, California. His parents were both educators. At age 11, Morrison started playing golf, and after graduating from Palm Springs High School he received a scholarship to play Division 1 golf at the University of Washington.

He attended the University of Washington (Seattle) from 1990-1995, receiving (4) Varsity letters for men's golf.

== Career ==
After college, in late 1995, Morrison went to work for Seattle-based clothing company Derek Andrew. Morrison moved to New York City in 1997 to work at a new division of Mudd Jeans. In 1999, Morrison co-founded Paper Denim & Cloth. He left the company in 2004 and subsequently founded Earnest Sewn.

In 2009 Morrison left Earnest Sewn and became the CEO/Creative Director for Evisu. In 2011, Morrison started 3x1, America's first bespoke denim tailor in SoHo, New York City.

In 2019, Morrison co-produced and hosted a denim docu-series Common Thread.

In 2020, Morrison co-founded golf lifestyle brand Radmor with former University of Washington golf teammate Bob Conrad.
