= Bonobos (apparel) =

American apparel company

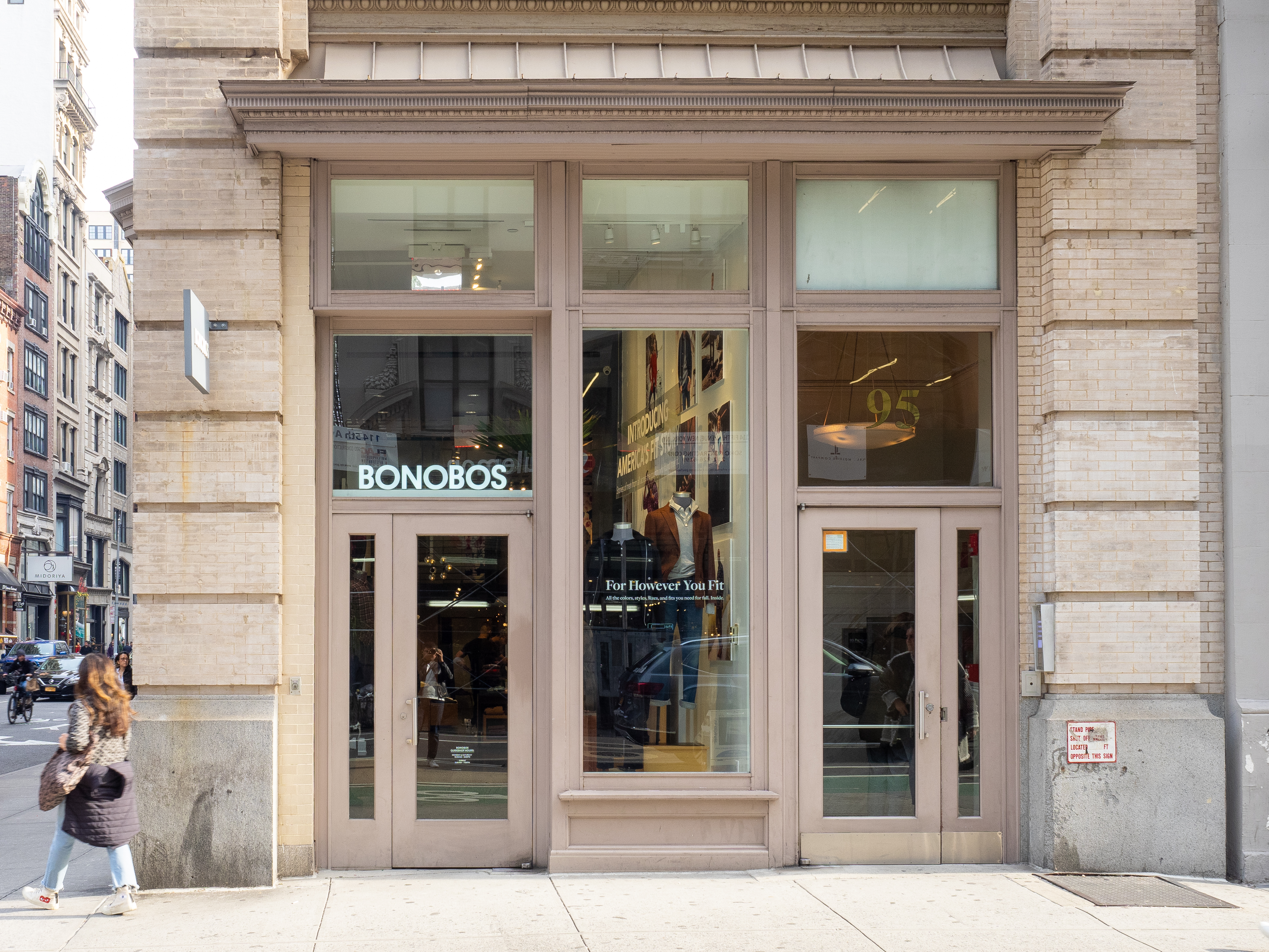
- Guideshop in Manhattan, New York
- Type: Subsidiary
- Industry: Retail, apparel, e-commerce
- Founded: 2007; 19 years ago
- Founders: Andy Dunn; Brian Spaly
- Headquarters: New York City, U.S.
- Number of locations: 62 (as of May 2019)
- Area served: United States
- Products: Menswear
- Parent: Express, Inc. (2023–present); Walmart (2017–2023)
- Website: bonobos.com

Bonobos is an upscale e-commerce-driven apparel company that designs and sells menswear including men's suits, trousers, denim, shirts, shorts, swimwear, outerwear, and accessories. The company was founded by Stanford Graduate School of Business students Andy Dunn and Brian Spaly, and launched as an online retailer in 2007.

In 2012, Bonobos diversified to incorporate physical retail locations with the launch of their "Guideshop" locations and through a partnership with Nordstrom.

In 2017, Walmart purchased the brand for $310 million. In April 2023, Express and management firm WHP Global agreed to acquire Bonobos from Walmart for $75 million. The deal was completed on May 25, 2023.

== History ==
=== Early history ===
Bonobos was founded by Brian Spaly, who began designing men's pants at Stanford Business School that featured a curved waistband, medium rise, and tailored thigh that fit better than khakis and eliminated "khaki diaper butt." As demand grew, he and housemate Andy Dunn pursued the project as a business opportunity.

Initially, the brand was launched exclusively online. Dunn cashed in his 401(k) to build bonobos.com and raised a round of angel investment. Initial investors included Wealthfront CEO and former venture capitalist Andy Rachleff and JetBlue chairman and founding Bonobos board member Joel Peterson, both of whom had lectured Dunn at Stanford Business School. Dunn then moved to New York with 400 pairs of pants that he picked, packed, and shipped from his Union Square apartment.

Within six months, the firm grew to five employees and a $1 million net revenue run rate. In its first three years, the company received over $7 million in funding from angel investors. In 2009, Spaly moved on to another venture, running the Chicago-based fashion commerce company Trunk Club.

In 2010, the company received its first institutionally-driven financing round, raising $18.5 million from Accel Partners and Lightspeed Venture Partners. As part of the round, Accel Partners's Sameer Gandhi and Lightspeed Venture Partners's Jeremy Liew joined Bonobos's board.

As Bonobos expanded its assortment to include suits, dress shirts, outerwear, and tailored pieces, more customers requested the opportunity to "try before they buy". In fall 2011, the company tested an e-commerce store at their New York headquarters, calling the location a "Guideshop". The purpose of the Guideshop location was to provide a physical space for customers to try on Bonobos prior to e-commerce transactions being placed. Within a year, the concept became an integral part of the firm's service and business model.

=== Company growth (2012–2017) ===
In 2012, Bonobos closed a $16.4 million strategic minority investment round led by Nordstrom, with participation from existing investors. In tandem, Bonobos partnered with Nordstrom to sell the brand’s clothing in their full-line stores and website. Bonobos furthered its offline reach in May 2012, opening its first standalone Guideshop location in Boston. By January 2013, Bonobos had opened additional Guideshop locations in Chicago, Georgetown, and San Francisco.

Bonobos announced a $30 million round in 2013, with Glynn Capital and Mousse Partners joining existing investors Accel Partners, Lightspeed Venture Partners, Forerunner Ventures and Nordstrom. At this time, Forerunner's Managing Partner Kirsten Green joined the Bonobos board and total funding to date reached nearly $73 million. Simultaneously, the company launched the golf brand Maide, which is the second brand launched by the Bonobos team. By August 2013, Bonobos had opened Guideshop locations on Crosby Street in New York; Bethesda, Maryland; Austin, Texas; and the luxury shopping enclave of Greenwich Avenue, in Greenwich, Connecticut, bringing the total location count to nine. By August 2013 employee headcount reached 175. Dunn temporarily hired Francine Della Badia, the former head of Coach's North American retail division and Victoria's Secret, to take his place in summer 2015. Three months later, she stepped down because "she felt she couldn't change the company's culture," and Dunn re-assumed the role.

=== History since 2017 ===
In June 2017, Walmart announced it was purchasing the brand for $310 million, making it a subsidiary within its fashion department. The brand would not be sold in the Walmart stores; instead it would be sold on Walmart's recently purchased Jet.com. Bonobos CEO Andy Dunn remained with the company after the purchase. He became Walmart's senior vice president of digital brands, which also included Allswell. Micky Onvural, who had joined Bonobos as CMO in 2015, became the new CEO.

John Hutchison became CEO in 2022 after Onvural's departure earlier in the year.

In April 2023, fashion retailer Express and management firm WHP Global agreed to acquire Bonobos from Walmart for a combined $75 million. Express would obtain the operating assets and liabilities for $25 million and WHP Global would obtain the brand for $50 million, with Express agreeing to license the brand rights in exchange for royalty fees. The deal closed the following month, on May 25.

In June 2023, Bonobos announced co-founder Andy Dunn would return to the company as an advisor. At this time, WHP Global CEO Yehuda Shmidman told CNBC he wanted to expand the company's physical footprint internationally.

On April 22, 2024, Express and all of its affiliated subsidiaries declared Chapter 11 bankruptcy in the United States, listing assets and liabilities between $1 billion and $10 billion. There were initially no planned Bonobos closures as of April 2024, but by June 2024 several stores had closed.

== Operations ==
Bonobos refers to its e-commerce site's customer service representatives as Ninjas, a term conceptualized by Dunn to attract college-educated qualified candidates to the job.

In early 2012, Bonobos opened a West Coast office to build a Silicon Valley–based technology team in an effort to expand its nationwide retail presence. Following 18 months, the firm attempted to minimize inefficiencies by eliminating bi-coastal offices, which were then redundant; hence, in 2013, Bonobos relocated the technology arm to its New York headquarters.
