= Kurabo Industries Ltd. =

Kurabo Industries Ltd. (倉敷紡績 also known as クラボウ) is a Japanese business group founded in 1888 as Kurashiki Spinning Works in Kurashiki. Employing 3,899 people as of March 31, 2026, its headquarters are in Chuo-ku, Osaka.

== History ==
The company changed its name to Kurabo Industries Ltd. in 1893. In 1895 Kurabo started to export cotton yarn under the Mitsuuma (三馬) brand name. Kurabo entered the denim industry in 1970. In 1973 it installed spinning equipment for denim yarn and released KD-8, which the company describes as the first domestically produced Japanese denim. In 1973 Big John started producing the first 100% Japanese jeans using domestically made fabric from Kurabo.
