= Donwan Harrell =

American fashion designer

Donwan Harrell is an American fashion designer. He was the founder and former creative director of the New York-based, luxury denim line, PRPS, and was the previously the head designer at Nike.

== Early life ==
Born in North Carolina and raised in Virginia, Donwan grew up in a low-income family. His father worked as a naval ship repairman and his mother was a seamstress. He often helped his mother sew her designs that she sold at local flea markets, and would sketch his surroundings to pass the time. His mother began entering him into art competitions. He began to design and sew clothing which he sold to other students.

Before he began high school, Donwan began taking pre-collegiate art and drawing classes at RISD before attending Virginia Commonwealth University on a partial scholarship. After graduating with a BFA in fashion design from VCU in 1989, he entered the Chambre Syndicale international fashion design competition sponsored by Air France, winning two years in a row.

== Career ==
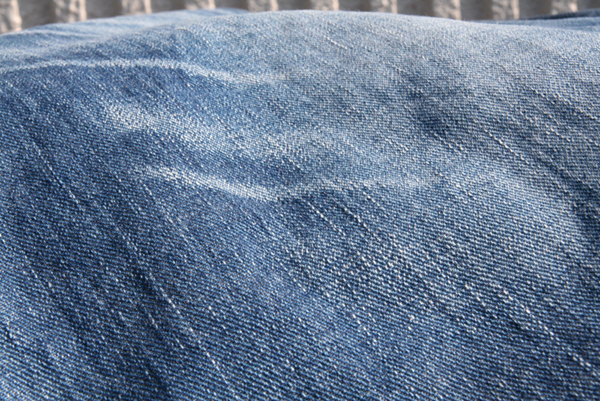
Denim-sample

Donwan moved to New York City and garnered a job as associate menswear designer for Robert Stock. After a brief stint at Joseph Abboud, he became associate menswear designer for Donna Karan. He worked with Nike based in Portland and then Hong Kong. Donwan created national uniforms for the 2002 World Cup including Italy, Nigeria, Brazil, United States, Korea, Japan, Poland, and the Netherlands. Additionally, he designed uniforms for many international team sports including rugby, baseball, basketball and football.

Donwan launched Prps in 2002. He left the brand in 2018.
