= Express, Inc. =

American fashion company

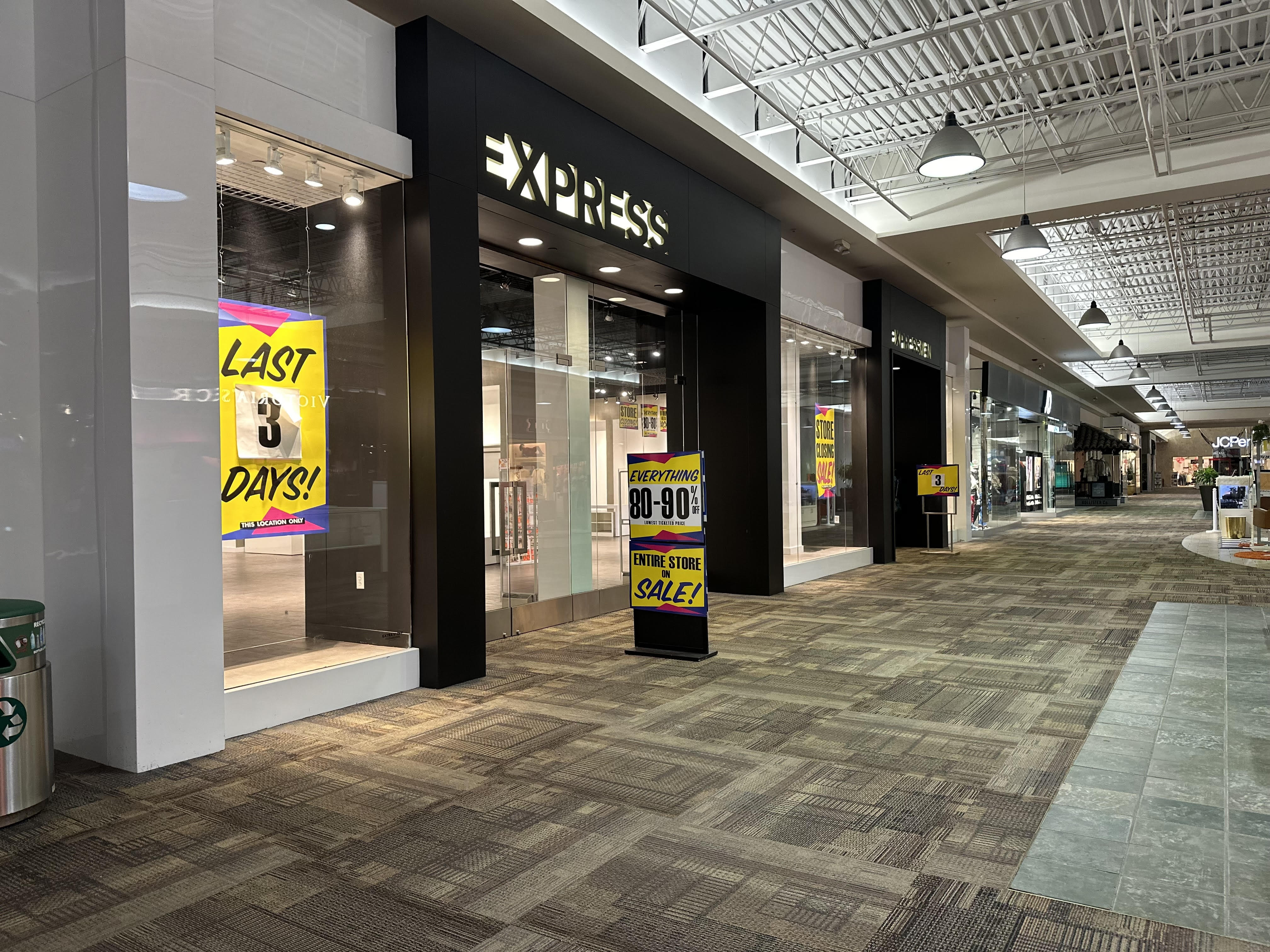
- Express closing inside the Southern Park Mall in Boardman, Ohio.
- Type: Public
- Traded as: OTCID Basic: EXPR; NYSE: EXPR
- Industry: Retail
- Founded: 1980; 46 years ago (as Limited Express); Chicago, Illinois, U.S.
- Headquarters: Columbus, Ohio, U.S.
- Number of locations: 500+ (2021)
- Areas served: United States, Canada (online only), Puerto Rico, Mexico, Panama, Costa Rica, Guatemala, El Salvador
- Key people: Stewart Glendinning (CEO)
- Products: Apparel; accessories; personal care; footwear
- Revenue: ▲US$1.87 billion (2021)
- Operating income: US$ 0.7 million (2021)
- Net income: US$ -14.4 million (2021)
- Total assets: US$ 1.25 billion (2021)
- Number of employees: 10,000 (2021)
- Subsidiaries: Express UpWest Bonobos
- Website: express.com upwest.com bonobos.com

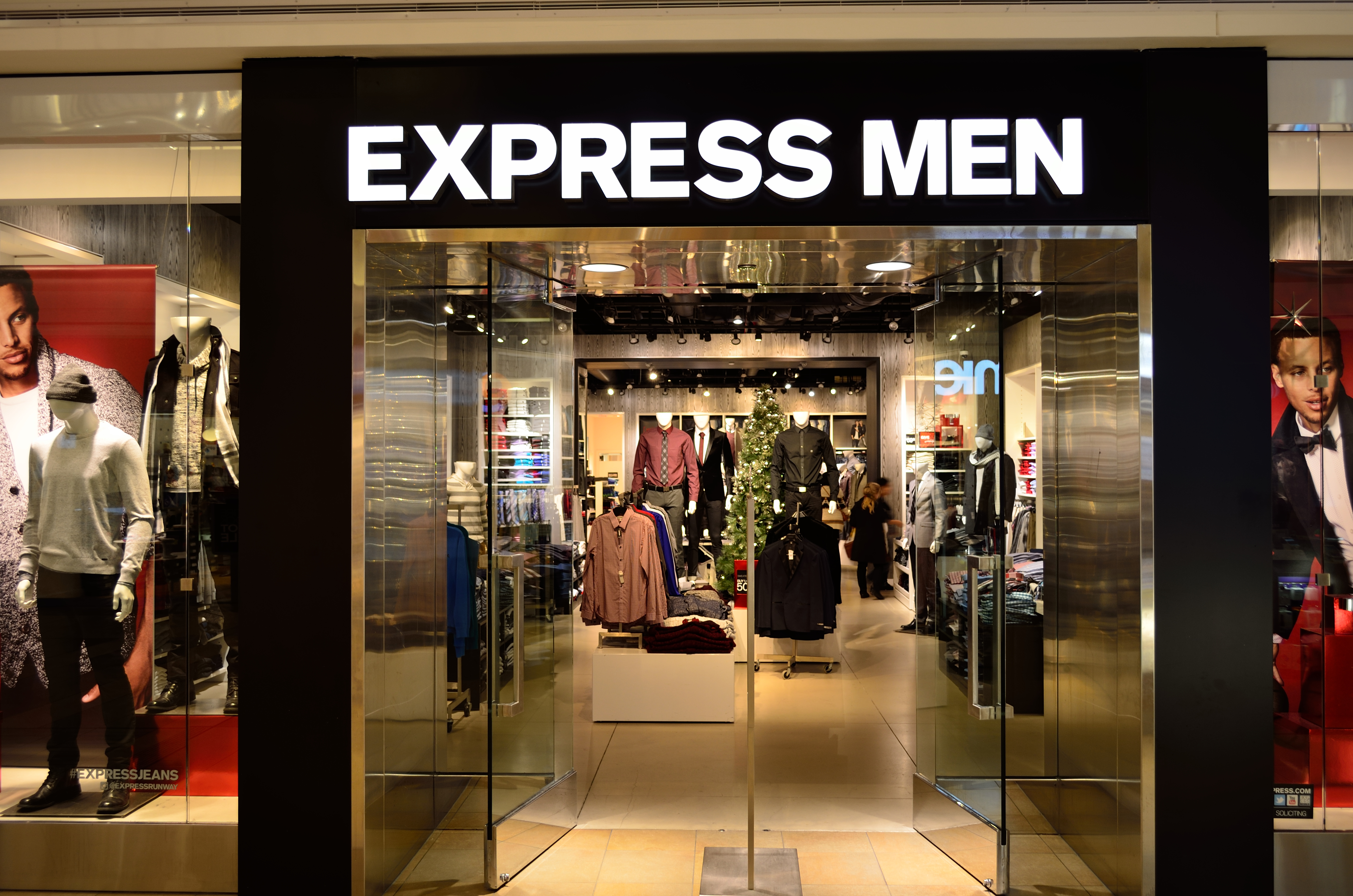
An Express store

Express, Inc. is an American fashion retailer whose portfolio includes Express, Bonobos and UpWest. It operates an omnichannel platform as well as physical and online stores.

Headquartered in Columbus, Ohio, and trading on the OTC Pink under the symbol EXPR, it operates more than 500 stores in the United States, Puerto Rico, Mexico, Costa Rica, Panama, El Salvador and Guatemala.

== History ==
Limited Brands opened the first Express store in 1980 as women's clothier "Limited Express" in Chicago's Water Tower Place. The store leaned heavily into the colorful trends of the 1980s as well as a faux French aesthetic. Former CEO Michael Weiss joined the brand in 1981 when the test expanded to include eight stores. The store dropped Limited from its name the following year.

By 1986, Express had 250 stores and began to transition away from neon lights, artificial fabrics, and bright colors. It started testing the sale of men's merchandise in 15 stores the following year. The men's fashion line was spun off into its own brand, Structure, in 1989. By 1991, Express had 600 stores and exceeded $1 billion in profit.

In 2001, Express became a dual gender brand with the reintegration of its Structure stores as "Express Men". Dual gender Express stores began opening the following year. Structure apparel brand was sold to Sears in 2003.

Express brought in $1.7 billion in net sales in 2006. In May 2007, Limited Brands announced its intent to sell a 67% stake in Express to an affiliate of a private equity firm called Golden Gate Capital Partners, based in San Francisco. When the sale was finalized in July 2007, Golden Gate's paid $484.9 million for a 75% stake in the company.

By January 2010, the company had 573 stores and generated $1.72 billion in net sales the year prior. The company held an IPO in May 2010, ultimately pricing its shares below the expected range. Soon after, Golden Gate and Limited Brands began divesting from the company. In July 2011, Limited Brands sold its remaining ownership interest. In March 2012, Golden Gate sold its remaining ownership interest.

By 2014, sales had been down over the previous two years. In June, Sycamore Partners announced it had acquired a 10% stake in Express, with the intention of buying the whole company. However, by January 2015, Sycamore had ended its pursuit.

In November 2019, Express announced a spinoff brand, UpWest, a DTC lifestyle brand geared towards health, wellness, and sustainability. With the launch of UpWest also came its philanthropic arm, The UpWest Foundation, which will donate 1% of total sales up to $1 million towards Mental Health America, Random Acts and Freedom Dogs of America.

In April 2023, Express, Inc and management firm WHP Global agreed to acquire Bonobos from Walmart for $75 million, with Express paying royalties to WHP.

=== Bankruptcy ===
In August 2023, Express announced it would be laying off 150 workers in effort to achieve $150 million in annualized expense reductions by the end of 2025. On October 24, it warned that it may have to file for Chapter 11 bankruptcy protection as it has been hit hard from the COVID-19 pandemic, stating store sales have been declining for years and rising costs putting the company in heavy debt.

In February 2024, Express warned it was preparing for a debt restructuring process and a bankruptcy filing within the upcoming weeks, and had hired M3 and Kirkland & Ellis to advise the firm on discussions with lenders and bondholders.

Express Men storefront. Southern Park Mall, Boardman, Ohio c. 2020.

On April 2, Express warned that it could file for bankruptcy as soon as the following week as it asked for lenders to help finance the bankruptcy procedure. It was having trouble paying its creditors. As a result, Express' stock fell approximately 14%.

On April 22, Express and all of its affiliated subsidiaries declared Chapter 11 bankruptcy in the United States, listing assets and liabilities between $1 billion and $10 billion. In addition to announcing plans to close 95 Express stores and all of its UpWest stores and begin a two-month liquidation sale at the affected locations, the company received a non-binding letter from WHP Global for the sale of most of its stores, operations, and assets.

Also on April 22, a day before warning that it could be forced to liquidate if it was unable to complete a proposed buyout within the next 30 days, Express reported that it would sell itself in Chapter 11 to a group led by Simon Property Group (SPG) and Brookfield Properties, and also warned that more closures could come within weeks.

On June 25, 2024, after receiving court approval, it was announced that the company had its assets acquired by PHOENIX, a joint venture led by WHP Global, SPG and Brookfield Properties.

== Design studio ==
Express clothes are designed at the Express Design Studio on 111 Fifth Avenue, New York City, in Manhattan's Flatiron District.
