= Foundrae =

American luxury jewelry

- Type: Private
- Industry: Jewelry
- Founded: 2015; 11 years ago in New York City
- Founder: Beth Bugdaycay; Murat Bugdaycay
- Headquarters: New York, NY, USA
- Key people: Beth Bugdaycay, Murat Bugdaycay
- Products: Luxury jewelry, and lifestyle
- Website: foundrae.com

Foundrae is an American luxury jewelry and lifestyle brand founded by Beth Bugdaycay and Murat Bugdaycay. It is headquartered in New York City.

== History ==
Foundrae was founded in New York by Beth Bugdaycay, a jewelry designer, and her husband, Murat Bugdaycay. Foundrae was named by combining “Found” and “Rae”, the name of Bugdaycay's grandmother. The company's initial designs were focussed on modern heirlooms that were seen on their collection of clasps, pendants, and chains.

Foundrae debuted with a trunk show at Barneys New York in September 2015 and then proceeded with an official launch at retail spring/summer 2016. In January 2018, Town & Country recognized Beth Bugdaycay of Foundrae with the distinction of “Breakthrough of the Year” at the Annual Jewelry Awards. Three months later, Bugdaycay opened the flagship Foundrae store in New York City.

In July of 2023, Dallas based private equity firm Trive Capital, with nearly $8 billion in assets under management, made a structured capital investment into Foundrae.

In 2019, the writer Chimamanda Ngozi Adiche collaborated with Foundrae on its "Freedom of Expression” medallion, with proceeds to go to PEN America.
