= Big John (brand) =

Japanese clothing brand

Big John selvage jeans

Big John (Japanese: ビッグジョン) is a denim and casual clothing manufacturer founded in 1940 by Kotaro Ozaki (尾崎小太郎) in Kurashiki, Okayama Prefecture. Originally named Maruo Hifuku (マルオ被服), it was the first company in Japan to manufacture jeans domestically, and so has been called "the godfather of Japanese denim brands".

At first the company used made in USA fabric and sewing machines, but later contracted with the Kurabo mill and in 1973 started producing the first 100% Japanese jeans using domestically made fabric.

== See also ==
- Momotaro Jeans
- Edwin
- Evisu
- Kapital
