= 7 for All Mankind =

American denim brand

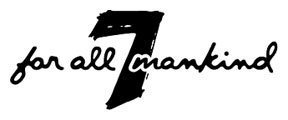
- Industry: Clothing
- Founder: Michael Glasser, Peter Koral, and Jerome Dahan
- Headquarters: Vernon, California
- Website: 7forallmankind.com

7 For All Mankind (often referred to simply as 7FAM) is an American denim brand founded by Michael Glasser, Peter Koral, and Jerome Dahan in 2000 and headquartered in Vernon, California. It was purchased by the VF Corporation in 2007 and sold to Delta Galil Industries in 2016.

7 For All Mankind jeans are typically tight-fitting and mid-rise.

== History ==
7 for All Mankind began by designing women's jeans. A men's jeans line was introduced in fall 2002, and its Children Denim Collection in fall 2005. The brand is sold in over 80 countries including Europe, Canada, and Japan. Dahan and Glasser, denim designers who had worked in the apparel industry for years, created the company in response to what they saw as a void in the contemporary denim market. Focusing on female denim wearers, it has been stated that the company was successful because of the fit, fabrics, washes, attention to detail, and the logo on the product's back pockets. 7 For All Mankind's proximity to Los Angeles makes the brand popular with celebrities, including Prince Harry.

7 For All Mankind's Signature pocket stitching

== See also ==
- List of denim jeans brands
