= Trunk Club =

Clothing service

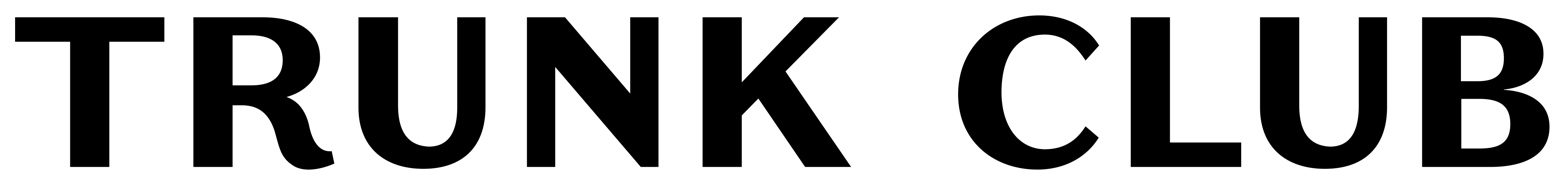
- Company type: Subsidiary
- Headquarters: Chicago, Illinois, US
- Area served: United States
- Founder: Brian Spaly
- Industry: Fashion
- Parent: Nordstrom
- Launched: 2009
- Current status: Closed

Trunk Club was a personalized mid- to high-end men's and women's clothing service based in Chicago, Illinois, United States.

Starting in 2009, Trunk Club pioneered the at-home try-on model within the men's clothing industry. Each customer worked with a styling specialist who curated clothing for their box (referred to as a "trunk"), which was shipped to their home or office. The customer could choose to either keep the clothes or send items back to Trunk Club, with billing occurring at the end of the process.

Trunk Club also offered an in-person styling service at the company's six locations, referred to as "clubhouses". The in-person offering included ready-to-wear clothing for men and women, as well as made-to-order custom formalwear for men.

== History ==
The Trunk Club remote styling idea was initially conceived in 2009 by Joanna Van Vleck while she was an MBA student. It began as a personalized clothing service based in Bend, Oregon. Initial investor Anthos Capital asked Brian Spaly to become founder and CEO of Trunk Club in 2010. Spaly was previously co-founder of online menswear brand Bonobos, and he left Bonobos before founding Trunk Club's Chicago operation.

Trunk Club first received $11 million of Series A funding in 2011, led by US Venture Partners, with participation from Anthos Capital, Greycroft Venture Partners, and Apex Venture Partners.

The key to growth was the partnership between Brian Spaly and Rob Chesney, who formed a dynamic duo of story-telling and inside operations complexity.

In addition to the original Chicago location in the River North neighborhood, Spaly led clubhouse expansion to Dallas, Washington DC, New York City, Los Angeles, and Boston.

Trunk Club was acquired by Nordstrom in 2014 for $350M. In an interview with the New York Times at the time of the acquisition, Spaly said that the company was profitable, "though barely" at the time. Nordstrom recorded a goodwill accounting charge related to the Trunk Club acquisition in November 2016. Spaly announced his departure from the company in early 2017. Terry Boyle, who led Nordstrom brands Nordstrom Rack and HauteLook, took over the position, before leaving the company in 2019.

In March 2020, Nordstrom CEO Erik Nordstrom announced that the company would be integrating the Trunk Club service into its full-priced stores. The existing Trunk Club Clubhouses would be “relocated” into nearby Nordstrom stores by fall 2020.

Trunk Club announced that it was closing for good starting May 31, 2022.

== Products and services ==
Trunk Club operated as a wholesaler and sold products at retail cost, rather than via a subscription model. There was a $25 home styling fee for each trunk that could be applied towards purchases. It was free for customers to receive consultations with a stylist in person at a clubhouse Customers did not have to commit to certain schedule for receiving items and they only paid for the items they wished to keep, which usually ranged in price from $100 to $300 per item.

Trunk Club also introduced "designer series" trunks, which were collaborations with some of their best-selling brands.

In 2015, Trunk Club launched their styling services for women.
