= Brittania Sportswear =

American clothing company

- Type: Privately held company
- Industry: Clothing
- Founded: 1973; 53 years ago in Seattle
- Founder: Walter Schoenfeld
- Defunct: 1987
- Fate: Acquired
- Successor: Levi Strauss & Co.
- Headquarters: Wyomissing, Pennsylvania, United States
- Area served: United States
- Products: Jeans
- Owner: VF Jeans

Brittania Sportswear was an American clothing company best known for women's jeans in the 1970s and 1980s. While it was in operation it was based in Wyomissing, PA. It is not to be confused with Britannia Clothing Company, a United Kingdom clothing company.

== History ==
Brittania Sportswear was launched in 1973 by Walter Schoenfeld in Seattle, WA. It once reached sales of $300 million a year and was the country's top-selling blue jean.

In 1983, it plummeted into Chapter 11 bankruptcy protection because of management problems and changes in fashion tastes.

The company was eventually purchased in 1987 by Levi Strauss & Co. In 1997, it was sold to VF Jeans (parent of Wrangler and Lee brands).
