= The Ido Portal Method =

Fitness method

The Ido Portal method
- Focus: Movement, Flexibility, Strength
- Country of origin: Israel
- Creator: Ido Portal
- Parenthood: Capoeira

The Ido Portal method is a physical fitness practice utilizing the practitioner's own bodyweight and movements, rather than external weights and machines, to develop strength, agility and flexibility. Developed by Israeli trainer Ido Portal, it is a mixed technique drawing primarily from Capoeira.

== The method ==
The Ido Portal method is based on the concept of self-dominance. The practitioners are encouraged to master their own body in free movement, often inverted or crawling on the ground, before engaging in other sports. The method is mostly inspired by Capoeira, which Portal practiced for years before developing his own technique. It also takes elements from dance, gymnastics, yoga and other martial arts.

== History ==
The method was developed by Israeli athlete and trainer Ido Portal, who said that his method draws on his 15 years of Capoeira practice. Some of his modifications of the Afro-Brazilian art include touching the ground with the buttocks and back, which is not usually considered good technique in Capoeira. Different videos and photographs of Ido Portal appeared in the middle of 2000s. Those clips showed him flowing on the floor like liquid, flipping and hand-balancing. The method is being used by people who call themselves movers, and is centered on "Movement culture".

== Notable people ==
Irish professional mixed martial artist and boxer Conor McGregor has trained with Portal. McGregor's coach John Kavanagh praised Portal's training especially for breaking the monotony of training, although most of the time training is still spent on fundamentals of MMA rather than movement culture.
