= Beth Hutchens =

Jewelry designer

- Occupations: Jewelry designer, entrepreneur
- Years active: 1996 – present
- Known for: Co-founder of Foundrae

Beth Hutchens (also known as Beth Bugdaycay) is a jewelry designer and entrepreneur living in New York City. In 2019, she was nominated for the CFDA Award for American Emerging Designer of the Year.

== Career ==
Hutchens started her career in 1996, she founded Rebecca Taylor, a clothing brand. In January 2011, the Rebecca Taylor brand was acquired by Kellwood Company. She remained with the company as CEO until December 2014 and announced that she was starting a new venture.

She co-founded the fine jewelry brand, Foundrae, with her husband, Murat Bugdaycay, in January 2015. The collection debuted with a trunk show at Barney's September 2015 and then proceeded with an official launch at retail spring/summer 2016. In January 2018, Town & Country recognized her with the distinction of “Breakthrough of the Year” at the Annual Jewelry Awards. Three months later, Hutchens with her husband opened the flagship Foundrae store in New York City.

In March 2019, Hutchens was nominated as “Emerging Designer of the Year” by the CFDA as the single accessory designer. Six months later, Jewelers of America announced Foundrae as a GEM Award nominee for the category of Retail Excellence. Winners will be announced January 2020. In the same months, Hutchens was named as a member of the Council of Fashion Designers of America, CFDA.

Murat Bugdaycay exited the company in 2023.

== Other work ==
She is a supporter of PEN America, founded in 1922, a nonprofit organization that works to defend and celebrate free expression in the United States and worldwide through the advancement of literature and human rights. In March 2019, Foundrae collaborated with Chimamanda Ngozi Adichie on the design of a medallion that celebrated Freedom of Expression with 100% of all retail proceeds benefiting PEN America.
