= AG Jeans =

American clothing company

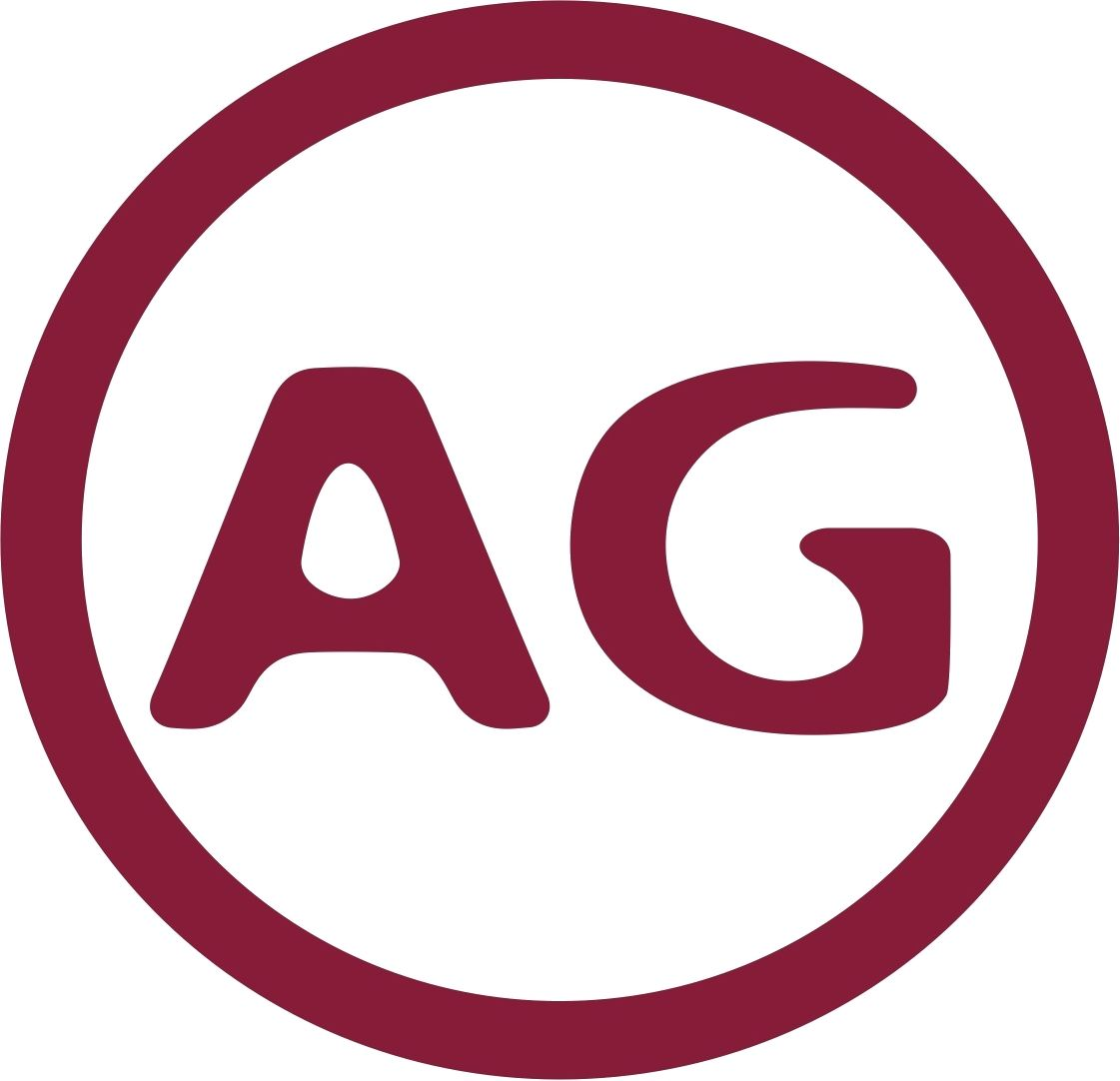
- Company type: Private
- Industry: Clothing
- Founded: 2000; 26 years ago in Downtown Los Angeles, California, U.S.
- Founders: Adriano Goldschmied; Yul Ku
- Headquarters: South Gate, California
- Number of locations: 16 retail stores
- Products: Jeans
- Owner: Yul Ku
- Number of employees: 800 (2019)
- Website: agjeans.com

AG Adriano Goldschmied or AG Jeans is an American clothing company with a focus on denim apparel created with sustainable manufacturing methods. Founded in 2000 in Los Angeles, California, the company is owned by its co-founder, Yul Ku, whose Koos Manufacturing previously produced jeans for several well-known brands. AG Jeans was also co-founded by Italian designer Adriano Goldschmied, who left the company in 2004 and sold his share of the business, as well as his namesake brand, to Ku. The company has 17 retail stores across the United States, including a location on Madison Avenue in New York, which opened in late 2020. Since 2010, AG Jeans has implemented several sustainability measures at its facilities, including a water-filtration system that allows it to operate almost entirely on recycled water.

== History ==
AG Jeans was founded in Downtown Los Angeles in 2000 by Italian designer Adriano Goldschmied and Korean-American jeans manufacturer Yul Ku. The company was initially a collaboration between Goldschmied and Ku's Koos Manufacturing, a producer of denim apparel for several brands including Abercrombie & Fitch, Banana Republic, Gap, J.Crew, and Lucky Brand. The company's apparel entered the market in September 2001. In 2004, Ku bought out Goldschmied for full ownership of AG, including the brand name.

The company experienced a decline in business from 2004 to 2008, with retailers Nordstrom and Anthropologie both stopping their purchases from AG. Several creative directors were hired to replace Goldschmied before the appointment of Ku's son, Samuel Ku, in 2008. He introduced the company's "boyfriend" style of jeans and implemented several changes, beginning a resurgence in the business.

AG Jeans has focused on sustainability as its chief distinguishing feature as a brand since 2010. By 2014, its facilities began using energy-efficient cloth washers and upgraded to dryers that reused heat. In 2016, its headquarters were retrofitted with solar panels. In 2017, it upgraded its use of laser technology to distress jeans. In 2019, the company installed a water-recycling system that reduced its water waste and allowed it to operate almost entirely on recycled water.

In January 2015, AG Jeans collaborated with model and designer Alexa Chung to create a line of jeans. Chung and AG Jeans organized several debut parties in London, New York, and Los Angeles to celebrate the release of the line inspired by fashion of the 1960s and 1970s.

In 2019, AG Jeans announced a 12-month partnership with Water For People, a nonprofit organization working towards increased access to water in developing countries. The brand released a collection of apparel in collaboration with Swiss contemporary artist Blanda and up to $100,000 of revenue generated from the collaboration donated to Water For People.

In April 2020, AG Jeans donated $1 million to the L.A. County Response Fund setup by the California Community Foundation to help community clinics and hospitals in responding to the COVID-19 pandemic.

== Operation ==
AG manufactures all of its products in-house—including cutting, sewing, and distressing. With its main manufacturing facility headquartered in South Gate, California, the company has other facilities and affiliates in Los Angeles and Mexico City. AG Jeans has 10 retail stores in the United States, including Madison Avenue, Greene Street, Hudson Yards, and the Upper West Side in New York, and Westheimer Road in Houston. As of May 2019, the company employs approximately 550 people at its headquarters in South Gate and another 250 employees at its retail stores.
