= Enzyme washing =

Textile processing technique

Enzyme washing or "bio stoning" is a textile manufacturing technique in which cellulase enzymes are applied to denim. As with traditional stone washing, the intended effect is a faded appearance and softer feel. Because the technique relies on biotechnology, enzyme washing is considered an example of textile bio-processing.

== Technique ==
=== Mechanism ===
In the enzyme wash process, cellulases act on exposed cellulose on the cotton fibers, freeing Indigo dye from the fabric. The effect achieved by enzyme washing can be modified by using cellulase of either neutral or acidic pH and by introducing extra mechanical agitation by means such as steel balls.

=== Comparison to other techniques ===
==== Advantages ====
Enzyme washing is considered more sustainable than stone washing or acid washing because it is more water efficient. Residual pumice fragments from stone washing demand a lot of water to be eliminated, and acid washing involves multiple wash cycles to produce the desired effect. The substrate-specificity of enzymes also makes the technique more refined than other methods of processing denim.

==== Disadvantages ====
In enzyme washing, dye released by enzymatic activity has a tendency to redeposit on the textile ("back staining"). Wash specialists Arianna Bolzoni and Troy Strebe have criticized the quality of enzyme-washed denim compared to stone-washed denim but agree that the difference would not be detected by the average consumer.

== History ==
In the mid-1980s, recognition of the environmental impact of stone washing and increasing environmental regulations drove demand for a sustainable alternative. Enzyme washing was introduced in Europe in 1989 and was adopted in the United States the following year. The technique has been a subject of more intense scientific study since the late 1990s. In 2017, Novozymes developed a technique to spray enzymes directly on denim in a closed washing machine system as opposed to adding the enzymes to an open washing machine, further decreasing the water needed for the enzyme wash. The recent revival in acid-washed denim in the late 2010s as well as increased demand for eco-friendly denim voiced on social media have made sustainable wash techniques such as enzyme washing even more integral to the textile industry.

== See also ==
- Sustainable fashion
