= Devergo =

Brand of jeans

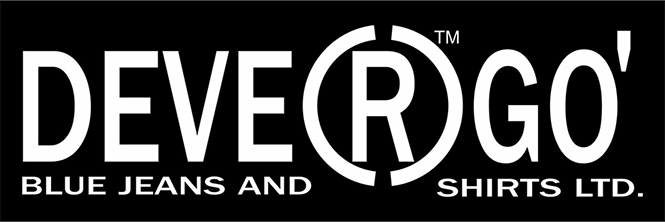
- Devergo Blue Jeans And Shirts LTD.
- Company type: Flas Kft.
- Industry: Fashion
- Founded: 1992
- Headquarters: Budapest, Hungary
- Products: Clothing
- Website: devergo.com

Devergo was established in Hungary as a brand of jeans for young men.

The brand's range was expanded with women’s clothing and unisex footwear. From the beginning of establishing the Devergo brand to nowadays, products have been characterized by novelties, brave colours, fabrics, and a strong appearance of graphic fashion elements. Devergo has been present on the jeans market since more than twenty years ago, mainly in Europe.

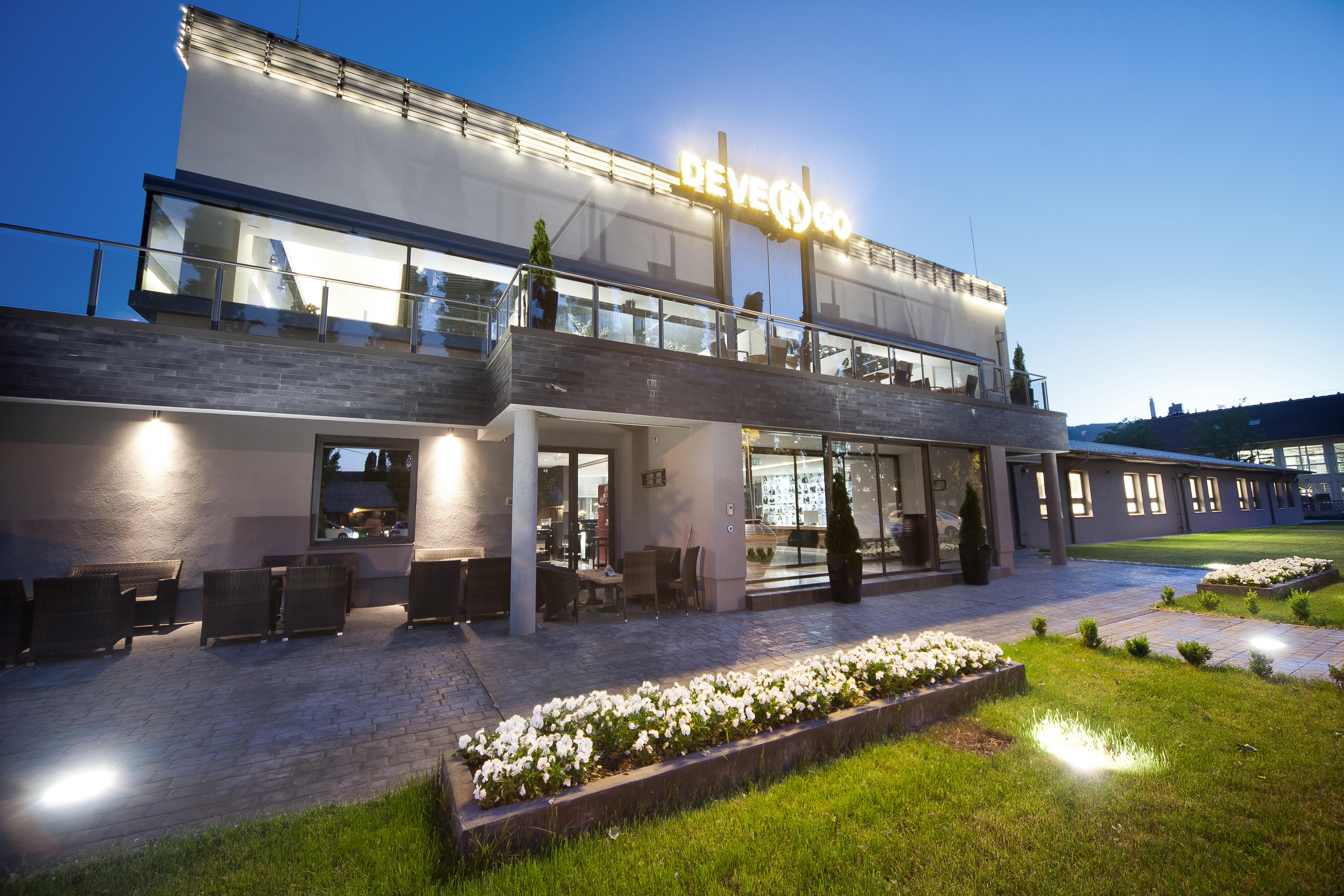
Devergo Hungarian Headquarters.

== History ==
The Devergo brand was established by Renata Sartori and Paolo Bolzonella’s MAGICAL POOL s.r.l. at the end of the 80’s in Noale situated in Northern Italy. During these years – together with the newly appeared Energie, Replay and Diesel brands — a new youthful approach and a fresh attitude was introduced to the Italian denim market. In Hungary, a small business enterprise Flas Kft. was established by a Hungarian and a young Greek man, and it began to distribute the Devergo products in October 1992 in a shop called “Rolling Store” under Síp street 9. At the time, “Rolling Store” was the biggest jeans shop in Budapest amongst ten other shops of similar profile. Wholesale distribution started in 1994 by participating in the "Budapest Fashion Days” exhibition by Hungarian Fashion Institute. Later, taking into consideration the specialties of the Hungarian market, the manufacturing rights were purchased for Devergo products which were not originally distributed by their Italian parent company. Following this, the export rights were also acquired and distribution to neighbouring countries began. In the first six years parallel sales were carried out in the Italian and Hungarian headquarters. By 1999 the Hungarian enterprise managed to purchase the Devergo brand name and protect it worldwide, both for manufacturing and distribution. Nowadays an international team works in the Budapest headquarters of the company, consisting of young Greek, Ukrainian and Russian people alongside Hungarian colleagues.

== Design and production ==
The leader of the international designer group, from the beginning to date has been the Italian fashion designer Cristiano Berto. Under his leadership several young designers learn to and work on designing and manufacturing jeans based on current trends.

More than half of the products are manufactured in the European Union. Trousers are exclusively manufactured in Greece and Italy. Sports shoes are produced in China and street shoes are manufactured in Italy, Romania, Spain, Greece and Portugal. The outerwear is manufactured in China, India, Hungary, Greece and Turkey.

== Countries selling Devergo products ==
Presently the products are available in the following countries: Netherlands, Serbia, Slovakia, Slovenia, Croatia, Russia, Ukraine, Greece, Cyprus, Libya, Germany, Poland.

Further planned expansions: United Arab Emirates, Tunisia, Malta
