= Tiffosi =

Portuguese clothing company

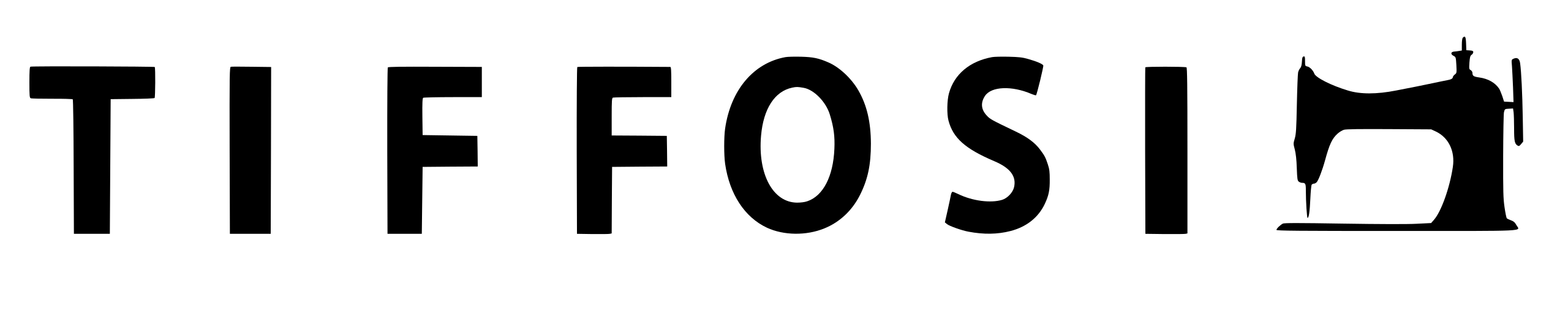
- Product type: Casual wear
- Current owner: Grupo VNC
- Produced by: Cofemel
- Country: Portugal
- Introduced: 1991
- Markets: Europe
- Website: tiffosi.com

Tiffosi is a Portuguese casual wear brand managed by Cofemel as part of Grupo VNC (VNC Group). Jeans are the main product of Tiffosi, along with T-shirts and sweatshirts. The company listed 300th on the top 500 largest companies in Portugal in 2022 by turnover. Tiffosi is considered the most popular jeans brand in Portugal.

== History ==
Cofemel as a company was established in 1979 and launched the Tiffosi brand in 1991. Tiffosi embarked on the international market in 2006 and the turnover reached 30 million euros in 2007.

In 2008, Grupo VNC acquired Cofemel. Grupo VNC (Vila Nova Carneiro) is led by Portuguese millionaire António Vila Nova with his siblings, who were seasoned in turnaround business in retail sectors.

As of 2015, the company had 70 stores in Portugal. It was also distributing its cloths to over 1 700 clients worldwide.

In 2020, Tiffosi, with a 4.5% market share, ranked second in the children's wear sector in Portugal, preceded by Zara (12.0%) and followed by Mayoral (4.1%).

== Controversies ==
On 30 August 2013, the Dutch-based casual wear brand G-Star filed a lawsuit against Cofemel over copyright infringement of its designs. The case was referred from the Supreme Court of Justice of Portugal to the Court of Justice of the European Union (CJEU) in order to determine whether applied art and industrial designs and models shall be protected under the EU copyright law. The CJEU's judgement is recognized as one of the leading EU cases in intellectual property law.
