= Hudson Jeans =

American denim clothing manufacturer

- Industry: Fashion Designing
- Founded: 2002
- Founder: Peter Kim
- Headquarters: Los Angeles, California, United States
- Website: www.hudsonjeans.com

Hudson Jeans is a US-based premium denim manufacturer founded in 2002 by Peter Kim in Los Angeles, California. Ben Taverniti is the Creative Director of the brand.

== History ==
In 2009, Fireman Capital Partners took a majority stake in Hudson Jeans. Reebok founder; Paul Fireman and his son, Dan; were at the head of the investment fund during the period.

In 2013, Hudson Jeans was acquired for $97.6 million by Joe's Jeans. Hudson Jeans CEO Peter Kim remained as head of the company and also became a member of the board of directors at Joe’s Jeans.

== Products and services ==
Hudson Jeans offers denim line of designer jeans with trademark triangular back pockets, and a Union Jack logo. Customers known to wear Hudson Jeans include Cara Delevingne and Britney Spears. Hudson Jeans also worked with Georgia May Jagger as one of the brand's model.

== See also ==
- Jeans
- Designer clothing
