= Outland Denim =

Australian denim company

- Type: Private
- Industry: Clothing
- Founded: 2011
- Founder: James Bartle
- Headquarters: Australia
- Area served: International
- Products: Jeans, denim clothing
- Number of employees: 65
- Website: outlanddenim.com.au

Outland Denim is an Australian denim company that gained in popularity after Meghan, Duchess of Sussex, wore a pair on her royal tour in Australia in 2018. The company started by James Bartle in 2011 was founded with the mission of helping survivors of human trafficking in Asia and now also provides living wages to its seamstresses in small villages in Cambodia.

== Background ==
In 2008, founder Bartle saw the film Taken about sex traffickers which brought the topic to his mind. In 2011, while visiting an anti-trafficking organization called Destiny Rescue, he saw human trafficking and decided to create a company to help those at risk. His first factory in rural Cambodia started with five employees and now has 65 earning a living wage.

The brand started in 2011 with pop-up sales in Australia during music festivals. They launched in Canada in 2018 and are a Certified B Corporation international brand. In 2018, Meghan Markle wore a pair of Outland Denim black jeans, following which the brand received a 948% increase in online traffic.
