= London Denim =

Fashion brand

- Founded: 2001
- Founder: Simon King
- Website: London Denim's website

London Denim was created in 2001 by Simon King.

Initially they made jeans in the UK then moved to Italy and Japan. Working with Cone Denim, UCO, Legler and Japanese mills to provide core materials. They deconstructed / reconstructed played with washes, printing and customising and came up with innovative processes to get around the lack of denim skills in the UK. They were the first denim label to show at London Fashion Week exhibition in 2001 paving the way for other streetware brands to follow.

In 2015 London Denim launched London Denim men's - jeans for a Modern Creative Man.
