= Made in Japan =

Made in Japan may refer to:

- Products made in Japan; see Manufacturing in Japan

== Music ==
- Made in Japan (band), an Australian indie rock band, 2009–2014

=== Albums and EPs ===
- Made in Japan (EP), a 2012 EP by Bella Thorne and Zendaya
- Made in Japan (Deep Purple album), 1972
- Made in Japan (Flower Travellin' Band album), 1972
- Made in Japan (Deep Forest album), 1999
- Made in Japan (Live at Parco Capello), a 2001 live album by Elio e le Storie Tese
- Made in Japan (Whitesnake album), 2013
- Made in Japan (Ayumi Hamasaki album), 2016
- Made in Japan, a 1993 album by Siniestro Total

=== Songs ===
- "Made in Japan" (song), by Buck Owens, 1972
- "Made in Japan", a song performed by Ysa Ferrer, 2003
- "Made in Japan", a song by John Entwistle from Rigor Mortis Sets In

== Other uses ==
- Made in Japan: Akio Morita and Sony, autobiography of Akio Morita, co-founder and former chairman of Sony Corporation, 1986
- Made in Japan: Kora!, 2011 film
- "Made in Japan" (Bump in the Night), a 1994 episode of the television show Bump in the Night
- Grenzeloze Liefde – Made in Japan, a 1996 documentary film about Dutch women living in Japan
- "Made in Japan" (Shake It Up episode), a 2012 episode of Shake It Up
- Made in Japan (Playhouse 90), an American television play

== See also ==
- Maid in Japan, the 2014 debut mini-album by Japanese band Band-Maid
- Maiden Japan, the 1981 EP by band Iron Maiden
