= Texas Jeans USA =

American clothing company

- Industry: Clothing
- Headquarters: Asheboro, North Carolina, U.S.
- Area served: Worldwide
- Key people: Wallace Thompson
- Products: Denim
- Number of employees: 300 (2014)
- Parent: Fox Apparel Inc.
- Website: texasjeans.com

Texas Jeans USA was an American clothing company that manufactured denim and wildland firefighting clothing in Asheboro, North Carolina. A subsidiary of Fox Apparel, they were, "one of the last denim jean makers left that were 100% made in the USA."

The company's facility had been making products for more than 45 years. In 2007, the company employed approximately 150 people. By 2014, the company employed approximately 300 people at its 186,000 square foot manufacturing facility.

As of January 15, 2024, Origin BJJ (originusa.com) made the decision to halt production of all Texas Jeans. Sales had reached an all-time high for Origin garments and all sewing capacity would be utilized to fulfill this demand. By June 1, 2024, all products shown on the Texas Jeans website were marked as "sold out".
