= Edwin (company) =

Clothing retailer

EDWIN Co., Ltd.
- Native name: 株式会社エドウイン
- Industry: Jeans Apparel
- Founded: 1947; 79 years ago
- Headquarters: Tokyo, Japan
- Owner: Itochu
- Website: edwin.co.jp

Edwin Co. Ltd. (株式会社エドウイン stylized EDWIN) is a Japanese clothing brand founded in 1947 by Tsunemi Yonehachi (常見米八) which mainly focuses on jeans manufacture.

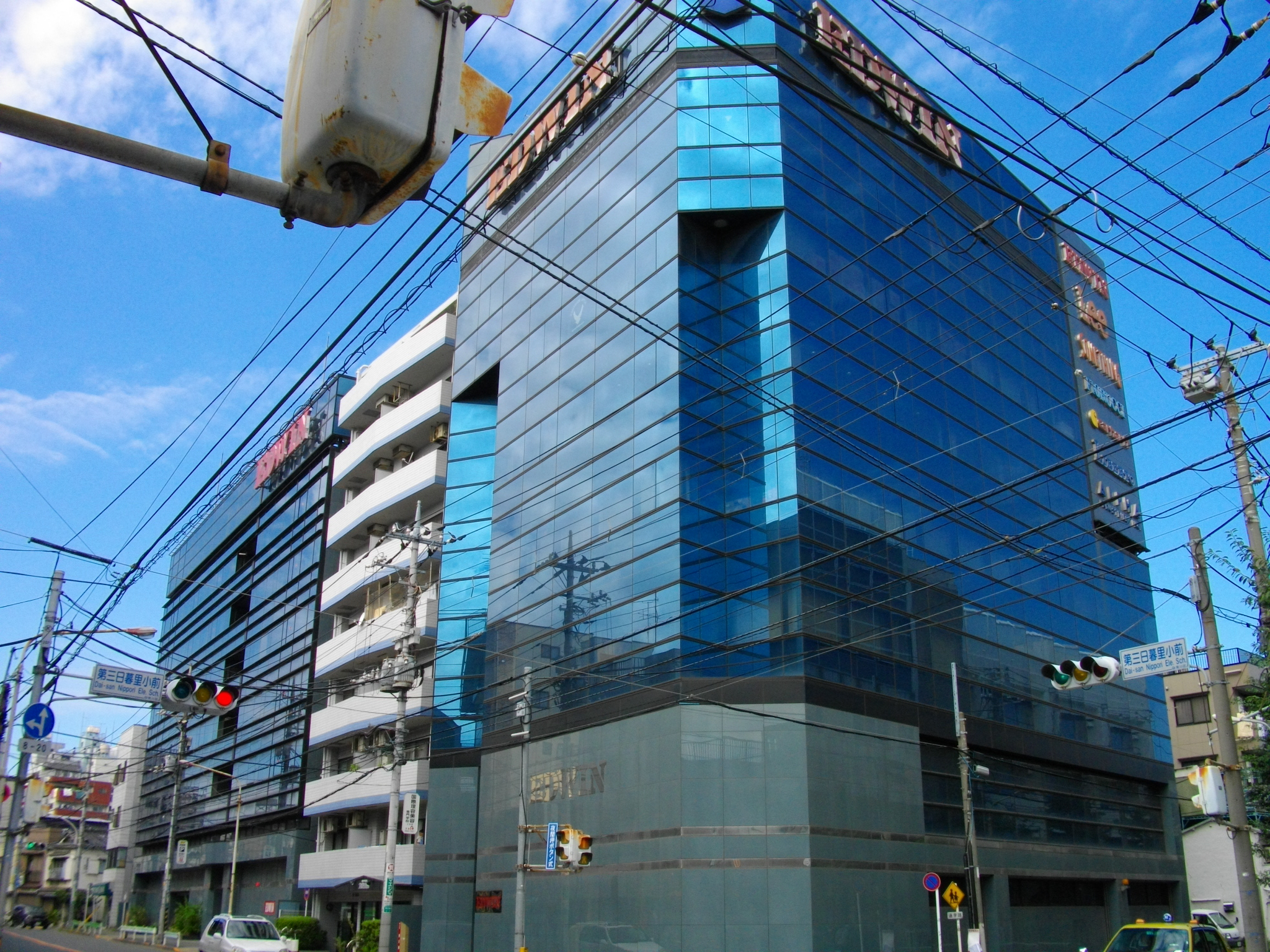
Edwin Head Office

Their most popular line of clothing is the 503 jeans model, which was first sold in 1997. The company has flagship concept stores in Japan in Harajuku, Tokyo and Minami-Horie, Osaka.

Its brands include EDWIN, SOMETHING, C17, and Ladiva by EDWIN.

Its name comes from a creative rearrangement of the letters in the word "denim".

== History ==
Established in Tokyo in 1947 (originally named 常見米八商店), the EDWIN brand began with imported used jeans from the United States, which Tsunemi washed, repaired and sold second-hand. In 1951, after obtaining traditional looms, the company produced its first Japanese canvas jeans.

In 1961, inspired by a growing demand, EDWIN debuted the first jeans made in Japan.

By the 1970s, EDWIN had established itself as a pioneer in denim manufacturing, experimenting with wash techniques in the EDWIN Wash House that impacted denim wash processes around the globe. Innovations included ONE WASH, a prewash process to eliminate shrinkage prior to purchase, and OLD WASH, a precursor to stone wash that reproduces faded colors through careful abrasion techniques for a lived-in denim look.

The company has set a goal to use 100% regenerative cotton by 2030.

== Marketing ==
Actor Brad Pitt has been an official spokesman and model for the brand, appearing in many of its advertisements from 1996 to 1999.

== See also ==
- Momotaro Jeans
- Big John
- Evisu
- Kapital
