= Evisu =

Japanese designer clothing company

EVISU
- Type: Private
- Industry: Apparel
- Founded: 1991
- Founder: Hidehiko Yamane
- Headquarters: Osaka, Japan
- Area served: Worldwide
- Products: Apparel; Accessories; Undergarment

Evisu Jeans (エヴィスジーンズ) is a Japanese designer clothing company that specializes in producing denim wear. The brand was founded by Hidehiko Yamane in 1991 in Osaka. Its current headquarters are in Shijō, Osaka. They gained popularity in the early 2000s amongst celebrities and American rappers.

The company name was originally “Evis”, derived from “Levi's” without the initial "L". Its name evolved to refer to the Japanese Ebisu (恵比寿) god of fortune.

== Production ==
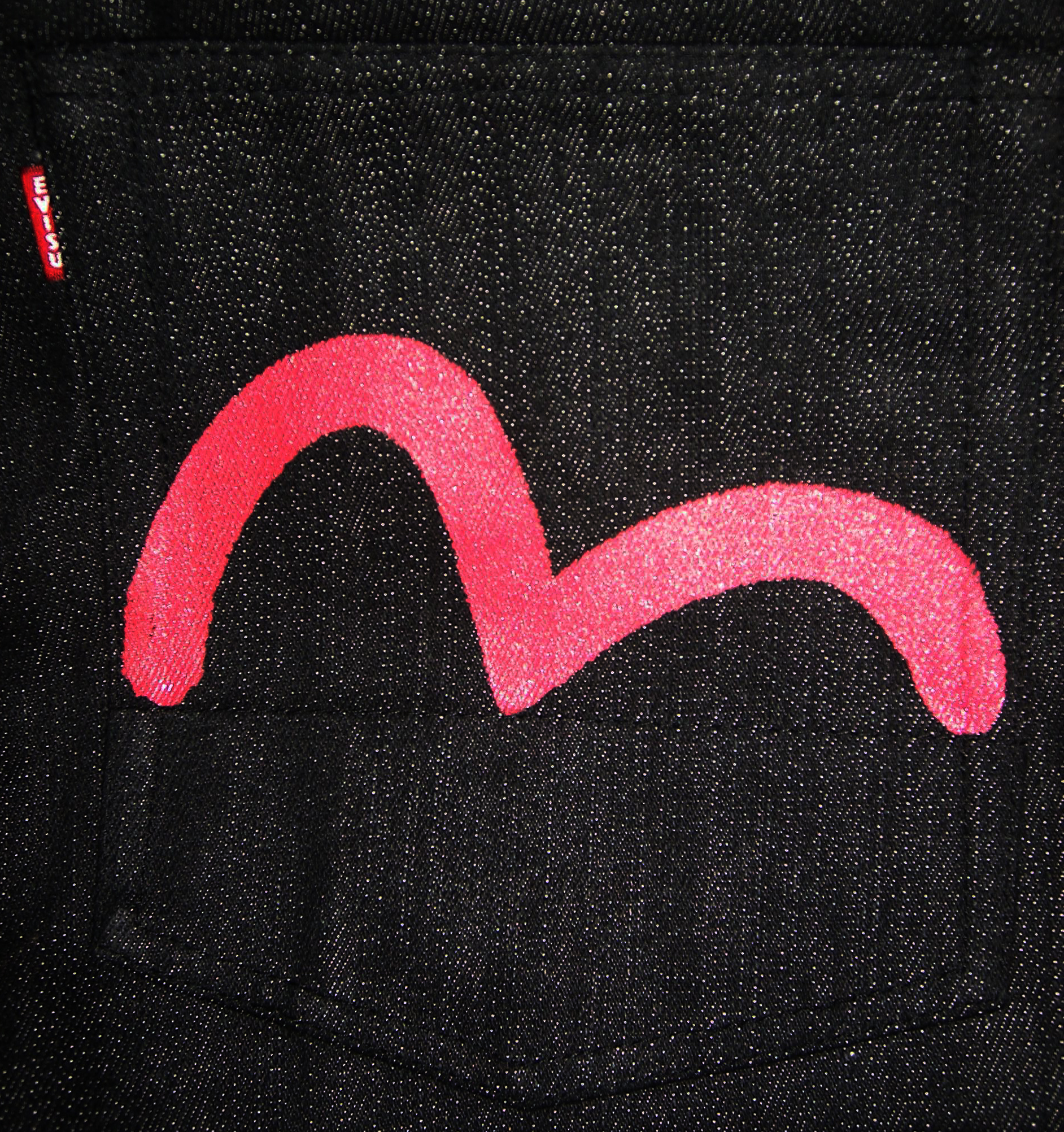
Evisu seagull logo

The initial production line allowed about 14 pairs of jeans a day to be produced, with each of them having a seagull hand painted on them by Yamane himself. Ebisu is the name of the Japanese folk god of money who is usually portrayed with a fishing rod.

== Legal issues ==
In March 2006, the company and Yamane were reported to Tokyo District Public Prosecutor's Office with another firm on suspicion of tax evasion. Yamane and the two firms stood accused of concealing more than 500 million yen of income as well as evading some 160 million yen in taxes over three years.

== Personnel changes ==
In 2009, Scott Morrison became CEO and creative director. Yamane left the company in 2022 and launched his eponymous brand in 2024. David Pun is the owner and CEO since 2018.

== Gallery ==
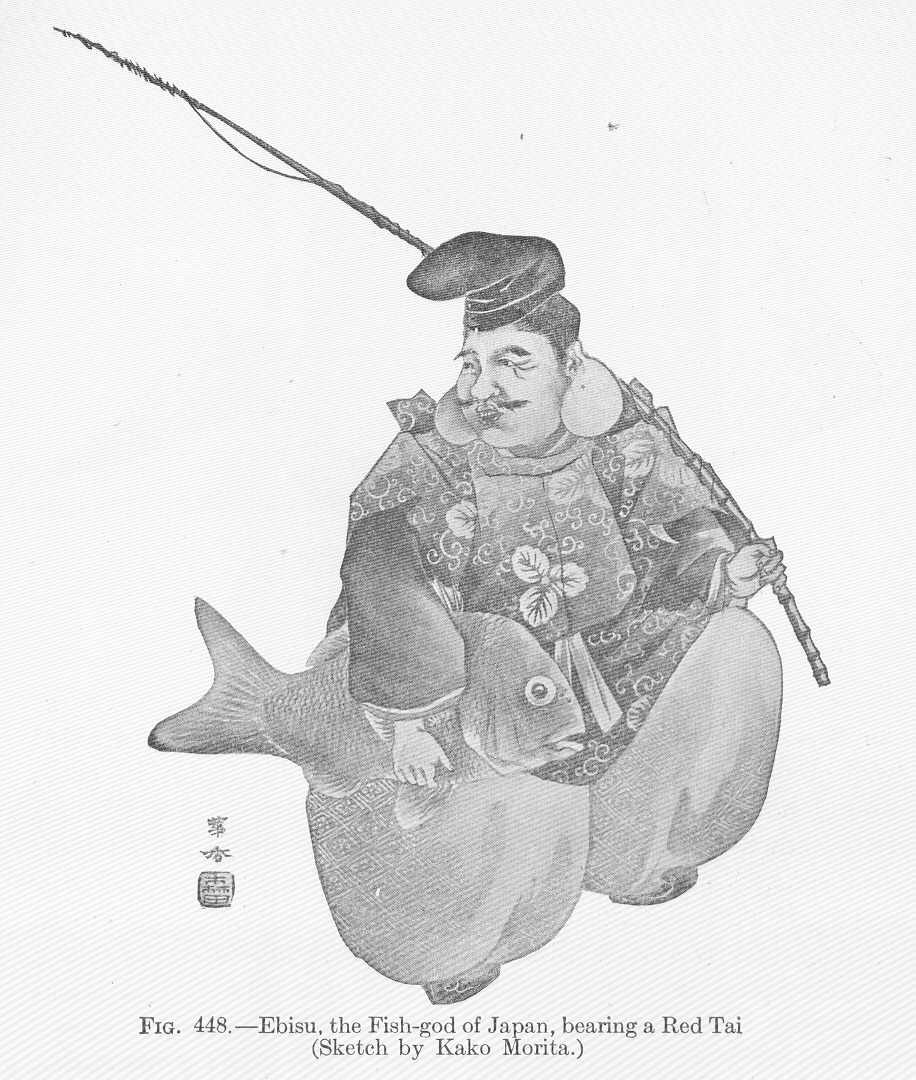
The Japanese folk god Ebisu (恵比寿) is the namesake of the brand.

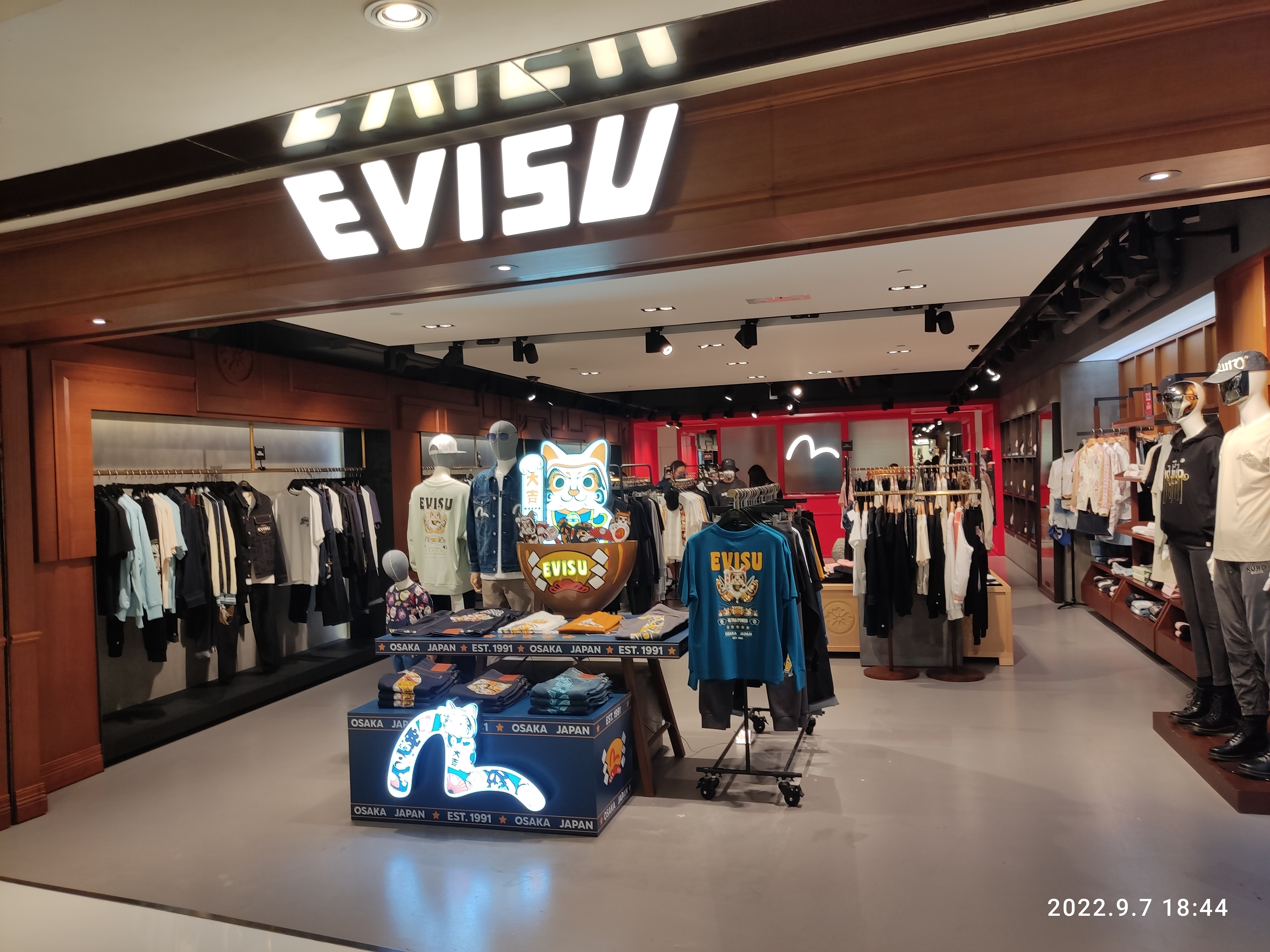
Evisu shop in Sha Tin, Hong Kong

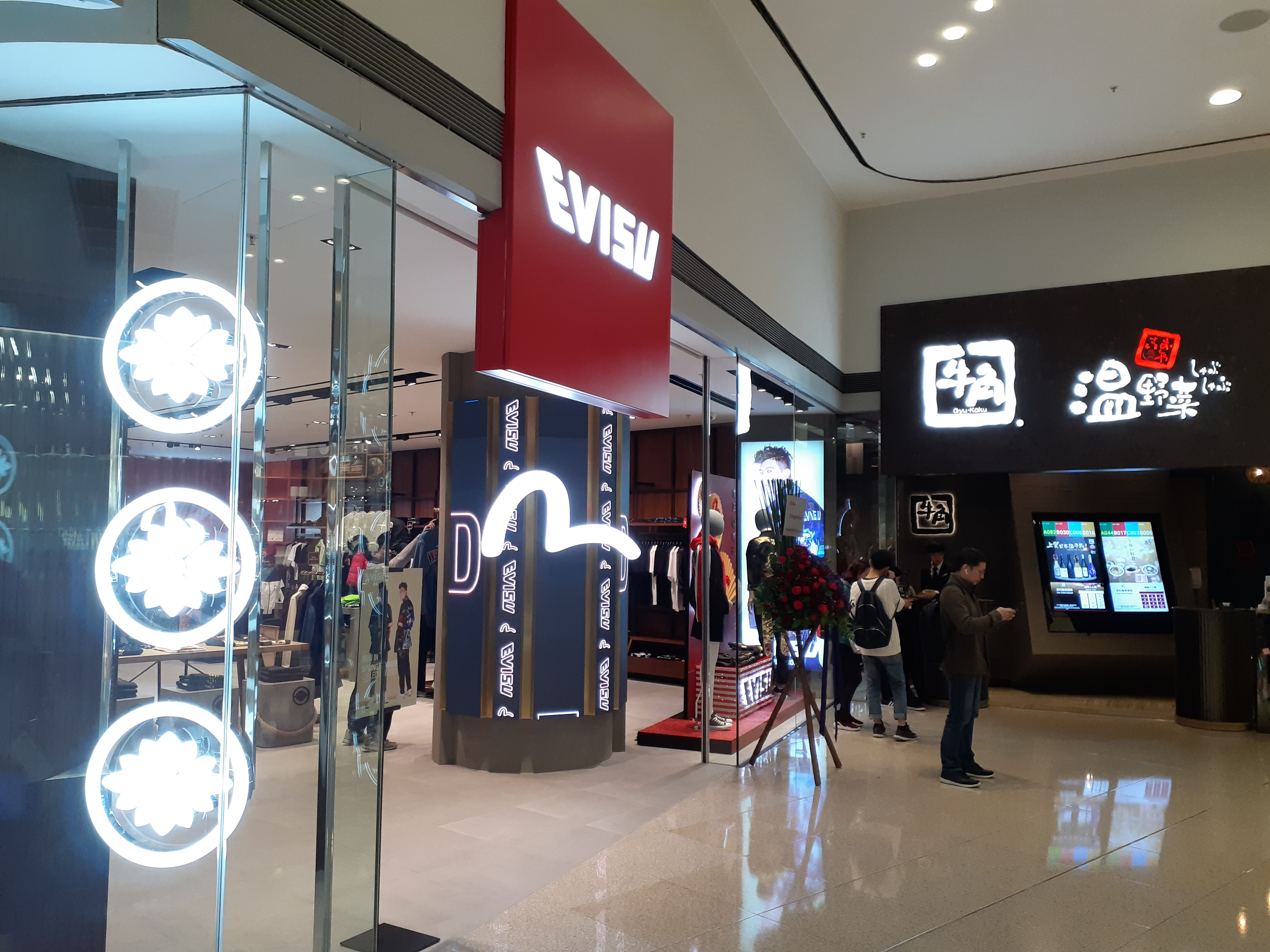
Evisu shop in Kowloon Tong, Hong Kong

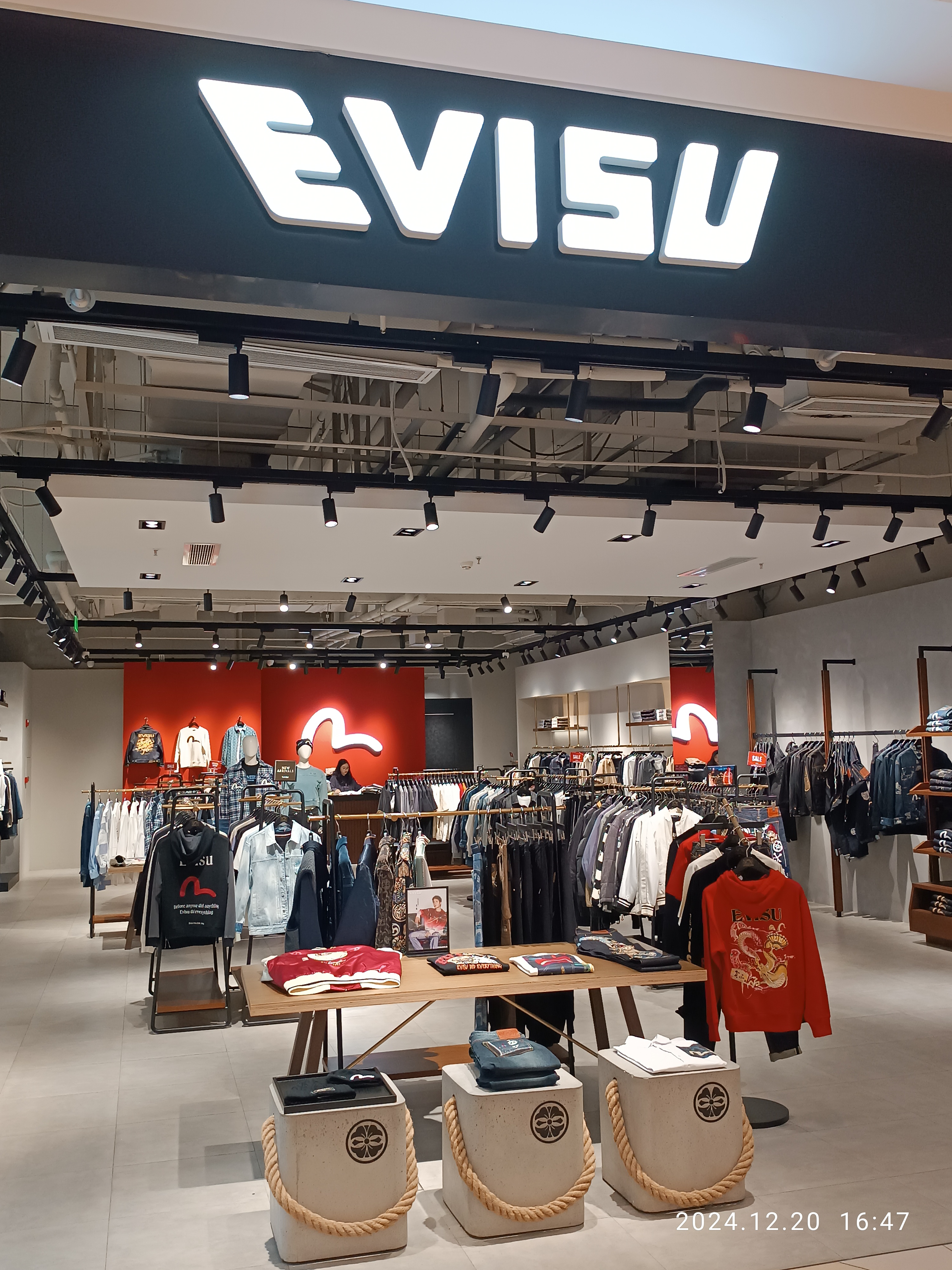
Evisu shop in Dongguan

== See also ==
- Big John
- Edwin
- Momotaro Jeans
- Kapital
