= Cotton production in Zimbabwe =

Zimbabwe cotton production totaled an estimated 38,500 tonnes in 2026. Output has dropped sharply from a peak of over 350,000 tonnes in 2010–2011. Cotton is farmed by 350,000 to 400,000 smallholder households cultivating average plots of 1 to 2 hectares primarily across Gokwe, Sanyati, and northern regions of Zimbabwe. The state-run Cotton Company of Zimbabwe (Cottco) dominates the sector with roughly 85% market share. Most lint is exported raw to Pakistan, Lesotho, and Mauritius though initiatives like the OPEC Fund.

== See also ==
- Better Cotton Initiative
- agriculture in Zimbabwe
