= Kapital (brand) =

Japanese denim and fashion brand

KAPITAL
- Type: Private
- Industry: Fashion
- Founded: March, 1985
- Founder: Toshikiyo Hirata
- Headquarters: Kurashiki, Okayama Prefecture, Japan
- Number of locations: 13
- Key people: Toshikiyo Hirata; Kiro Hirata
- Products: Denim, clothing
- Brands: Kapital; Kountry
- Website: kapital.jp

Kapital (Japanese: キャピタル), often stylized as KAPITAL, is a Japanese denim and clothing brand known for its use of traditional textile and patchwork methods. Kapital was founded in 1985 by Toshikiyo Hirata.

The clothing brand is renowned for its denim, workwear, and Americana-inspired garments, and has developed a cult following for its eclectic and handicraft work and limited-production denim. It has been described as “ perhaps the best-known Japanese workwear brand on the planet.”

Kapital operates 13 stores across Japan, and is sold in select retailers globally. Clothing is produced across 4 sewing factories and 1 dyeing factory.

== Etymology ==
The "Kapital" name originates in the company's founding in Kojima District, Okayama, an area known as Japan's "Denim Capital".

== History ==
Toshikiyo Hirata was inspired to begin making denim after visiting the United States in the 1980s to teach karate where he encountered mid-century American denim. Upon his return to Japan, he studied denim-making techniques in Kojima, and started a denim factory in 1984 replicating the quality of mid-century American-made denim. Hirata formally founded the Kapital brand soon after in 1985.

Toshikiyo's son Kiro Hirata joined the brand in 2002 to assist in contemporary fashion and marketing appeal for the brand. Combined with its expertise in high quality denim manufacturing, the brand began to branch out into more niche areas of the fashion industry, and carved out a reputation for eclectic artisan designs.

The brand further began experimenting in the 2000s with natural and synthetic dyes, cut and sew garments, hand overstitching, bandanas, as well as creating more than just denim bottoms with tops, outerwear, footwear, and accessories.

Founder Toshikiyo Hirata died in April 2024. His son Kiro will continue to helm the brand as creative director.

In 2024,L Catterton, a private equity firm associated with French conglomerate LVMH, acquired a majority stake in Kapital.

== Production ==
Kapital specializes in multiple traditional and artisanal garment manufacturing techniques, such as sashiko, boro, quilting, patchwork, distressing, mending, cut-and-sew, and appliqué. In denim production, the brand also uses stone washing and enzyme washing. These techniques are modernized and adapted for contemporary production and innovation.
