= John 3:16 =

- ← 3:15 3:17 →
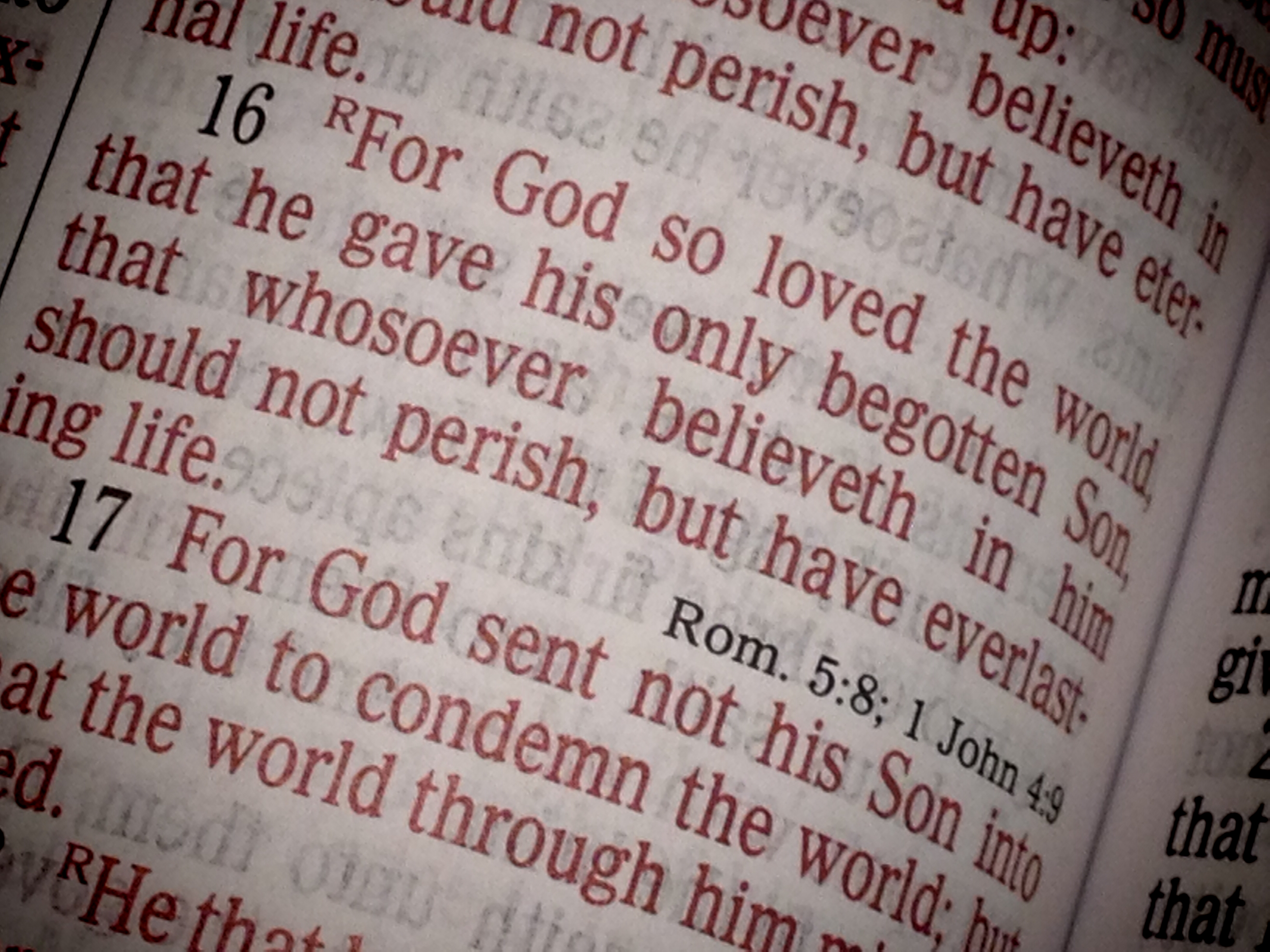
- Print edition of the King James Version
- Book: Gospel of John
- Christian Bible part: New Testament

John 3:16 is the sixteenth verse in the third chapter of the Gospel of John, one of the four gospels in the New Testament. It is a summary of one of Christianity's central doctrines—the relationship between the Father (God) and the Son of God (Jesus). Particularly famous among evangelical Protestants, the verse has been frequently referenced by the Christian media and figures.

It reads:

Οὕτως γὰρ ἠγάπησεν ὁ θεὸς τὸν κόσμον, ὥστε τὸν υἱὸν τὸν μονογενῆ ἔδωκεν, ἵνα πᾶς ὁ πιστεύων εἰς αὐτὸν μὴ ἀπόληται ἀλλ᾽ ἔχῃ ζωὴν αἰώνιον.

In the King James Version, this is translated as:

For God so loved the world, that He gave His only begotten Son, that whosoever believeth in Him should not perish, but have everlasting life.

John 3:16 appears in the conversation between Nicodemus, a Pharisee, who only appears in this gospel, and Jesus, the Son of God, and shows the motives of God the Father on sending Jesus to save humanity.

== Biblical context ==
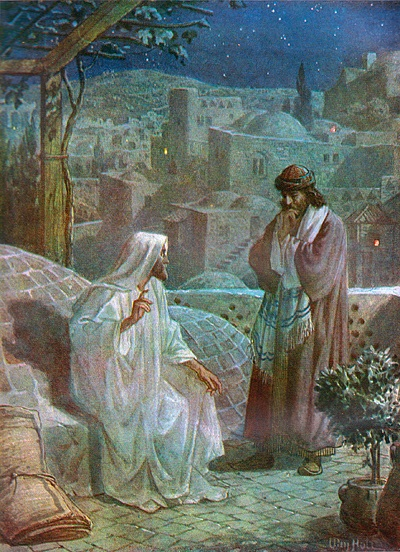
Jesus (left) and Nicodemus at night, depicted by William Hole

The third chapter of the Gospel of John begins with the conversation between Nicodemus, a Pharisee, and Jesus, a Jewish itinerant preacher. Nicodemus is never mentioned in the synoptic Gospels, and this is one of four times John mentions him: the others are 2:23–25, where he appeared but was unmentioned; 7:50; and 19:39. The meeting, likely in Jerusalem, is part of the passion of Jesus. Unlike Matthew, Mark, and Luke, the Gospel of John is the only one to mention Jesus' life not in chronological order.

Nicodemus was a member of the Pharisees, a Jewish religious movement in Second Temple Judaism. It was known for its strict adherence to the halakha (Jewish law), and for its highly oppositional attitudes of the ministry of Jesus. To avoid trouble with other Pharisees, Nicodemus came to Jesus at night; it is the only time a Pharisee is presented positively in the presence of Jesus. Later, Nicodemus became a follower of Jesus.

Nicodemus said he knew Jesus was "a teacher who came from God". He then added: "For no-one could perform the miraculous signs he was doing if God were not with him." They then discussed the need to be born again before being able to see the Kingdom of God and where the spirit goes after the death of the body. Jesus then spoke about salvation. He also criticized Nicodemus for his lack in the understanding of theology.

== Translations ==
Some of translations for the verse have been provided as below:

Language(s) or distinctive feature(s)	Translation	Contents
Syriac	Peshitta	ܗܟܢܐ ܓܝܪ ܐܝܝܩ ܐܠܗܐ ܠܥܠܡܐ ܐܝܟܢܐ ܕܠܒܪܗ ܝܚܝܕܝܐ ܢܬܠ ܕܟܠ ܡܢ ܕܡܗܝܡܢ ܟܗ ܠܐ ܢܐܟܙ ܐܠܐ ܢܗܘܘܢ ܠܗ ܝܚܐ ܕܠܥܠܡ܀ Hāḵanā gér ʼaḥeḇ ʼalāhā lʻālmā ʼaykanā dlaḇreh yḥyḏāyā yetel dkul man damhaymen beh lā naḇaḏ élā nehwuwn leh ḥayé dalʻālam.
Latin	Vetus Latina type	Sic enim dilexit DS mundu ut etiam unicum filium suum mittere in hunc mundu ut omnis qui crediderit in eum non pereat sed habeat utiam aeterna
Latin	Vulgate	Sic enim Deus dilexit mundum, ut Filium suum unigenitum daret: ut omnis qui credit in eum, non pereat, sed habeat vitam æternam.
Old English - Mercian	Rushworth Manuscript (c.950)	Swa forðon lufade god ðiosne middengeard //þte sunu his ancenda gisalde //þt eghwelc soðe gilefeð in hine ne losað// ah hifeð lif ecce
Old English - West Saxon	Wessex Gospels (c.950-1175)	God lufode middan-eard swa //þæt he sealde hys akennedan sune //þæt nan ne forwurðe þe on hine gelefð. Ac hæbe þt eche lyf.
Middle English	Wycliffite Bible - Early Version (c.1382)	Forsoþe god lovede so þe worlde, þat he ȝave hıs one bıgotun sone, þat ech man þat bıleveþ into hym perısche not, but have everlastynge lıȷf.
Middle English	Wycliffite Bible - Later Version (c. 1394–97)	For God lovede so the world, that he ȝaf his oon bigeten sone, that ech man that bileveth in him perische not, but have everlastynge lıȷf..
Middle Scots	Murdoch Nisbet (c.1520):	For God luvet sa the warld, that he gafe his aan begottin sonn, that ilk man that beleves in him perise nocht, bot haue euirlastand lif.
Early New High German	Luther Bible (1522)	Also hatt Gott die wellt geliebt/ das er ſeynen eynigen ſon gab/ auff daß alle die an yhn glewben/ nicht verloren werden/ ſondern das ewige leben haben.
Early Modern English	Tyndale Bible (1525)	God soo loved the worlde /that he gave his only sonne for the entent /that none that beleve in hym /shulde perisshe: Butt shuld have everlastinge lyfe.
Early Modern English	Tyndale Bible (1531)	For God so loveth the worlde yͭ he hath geven his only sonne that none that beleve in him shuld perisshe: but shuld have everlastinge lyfe.
Early Modern English	Coverdale (1535)	For God so loued the worlde, that he gaue his onely sonne, that who so euer beleueth in hi, shulde not perishe, but haue euerlastinge life.
Early Modern English	Rheims New Testament (1582)	For so God loued the world, that he gaue his only-begotten Sonne; that euery one that beleeueth in him, perish not, but may haue life euerlasting.
Early Modern English	King James Version (1611)	For God so loved the world, that he gave his only begotten Son, that whosoever believeth in him should not perish, but have everlasting life.
English	Douay–Rheims (Challoner) (1750)	For God so loved the world, as to give his only begotten Son; that whosoever believeth in him, may not perish, but may have life everlasting.
English; literal translation	Young's Literal Translation (1862, 1898)	for God did so love the world, that His Son—the only begotten—He gave, that every one who is believing in him may not perish, but may have life age-during.
English	Revised Version (1881)	For God so loved the world, that he gave his only begotten Son, that whosoever believeth in him should not perish, but have eternal life.
English - literary translation	The Holy Bible (Ronald Knox) (1945)	God so loved the world, that he gave up his only-begotten Son, so that those who believe in him may not perish, but have eternal life.
English; dynamic equivalence	Good News Translation (1966)	For God loved the world so much that he gave his only Son, so that everyone who believes in him may not die but have eternal life.
English; formal equivalence	New American Standard Bible (1971)	For God so loved the world, that He gave His only Son, so that everyone who believes in Him will not perish, but have eternal life.
English; in-between approach	New International Version (1978, 2011)	For God so loved the world that he gave his one and only Son, that whoever believes in him shall not perish but have eternal life.
English; formal equivalence	English Standard Version (2001)	For God so loved the world, that he gave his only Son, that whoever believes in him should not perish but have eternal life.
English; paraphrase	The Message (1992, 2013)	This is how much God loved the world: He gave his Son, his one and only Son. And this is why: so that no one need be destroyed; by believing in him, anyone can have a whole and lasting life.
English; dynamic equivalence	Kingdom New Testament (N. T. Wright) (2011)	This, you see, is how much God loved the world: enough to give his only, special son, so that everyone who believes in him should not be lost but should share in the life of God's new age.
English; optimal equivalence	Christian Standard Bible (2016)	For God loved the world in this way: He gave his one and only Son, so that everyone who believes in him will not perish but have eternal life.
English; formal equivalence	A Translation of the New Testament (David Bentley Hart) (2017)	For God so loved the cosmos as to give the Son, the only one, so that everyone having faith in him might not perish, but have the life of the Age.
English; formal equivalence	New Revised Standard Version, Updated Edition (2021)	For God so loved the world that he gave his only Son, so that everyone who believes in him may not perish but may have eternal life.

== Analysis ==
=== Exegesis ===
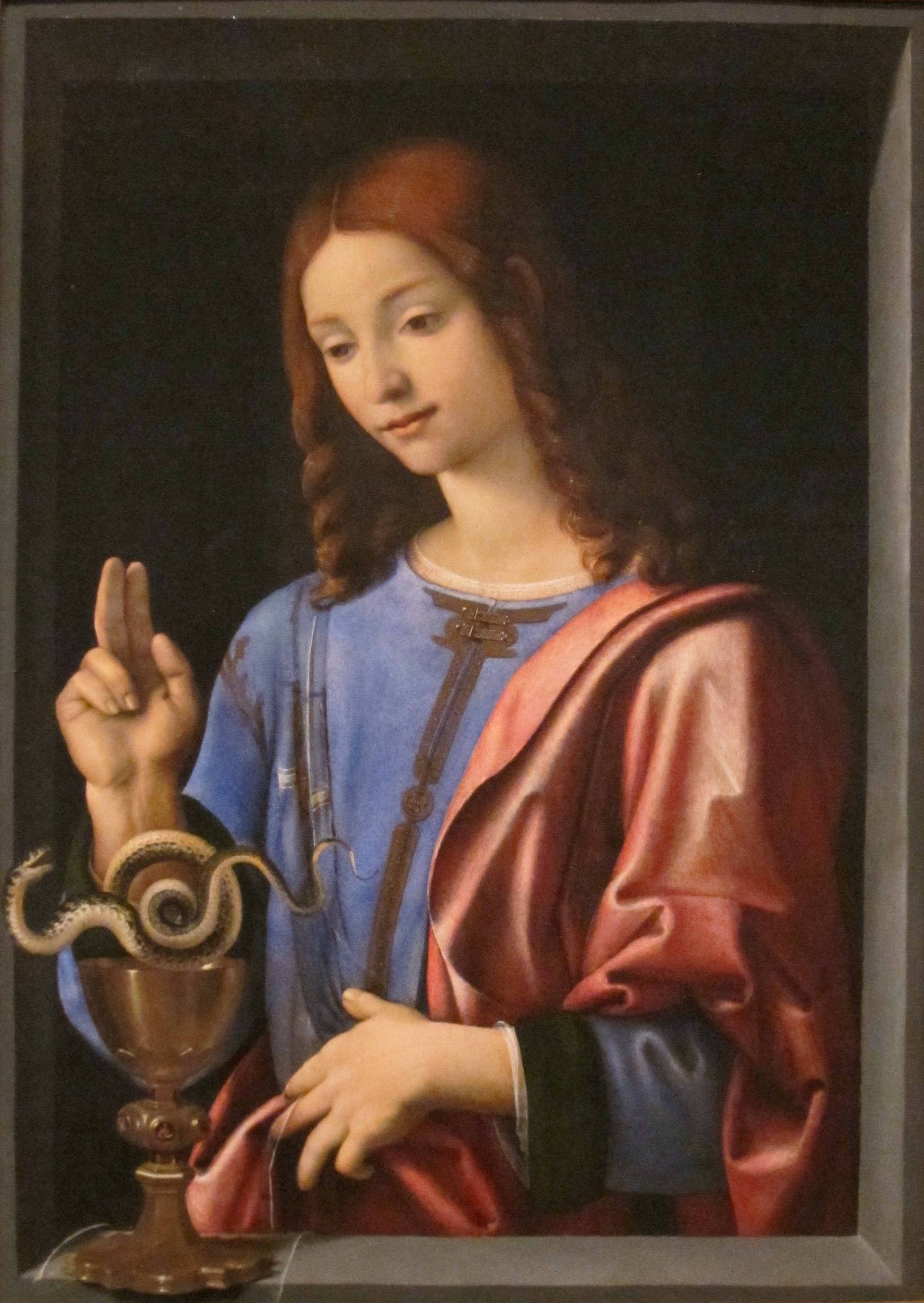
John the Evangelist is thought to have written the verse himself

John 3:16 has been termed as "the golden text of the Bible", "the gospel in a nutshell", and "everyman's text". One of the verses pivotal to the Johannine theology, it concerns God's motive for sending Jesus. In Christianity, it is thought that believing in Jesus grants eternal life to the believer. Eternal life is a dominant theme throughout John's entire Gospel, and its first appearance in the Gospel is in this verse. Theologian Larry Hurtado sees the verse as reflecting Jesus' importance in Christianity. The Methodist minister C. K. Barrett wrote, "Mention of ... the eternal life given ... to believers ... suggests ... the general setting of the work of Christ in the love and judgement of God."

The verse (which has parallels with John 3:15 (Note: John 3:15: "That whosoever believeth in him should not perish, but have eternal life." (KJV)) and John 3:17 (Note: John 3:17: For God sent not his Son into the world to condemn the world; but that the world through him might be saved. (KJV))) has been used by some to support Christian universalism, a view that all humans will eventually be saved by God. However, Anglican bishop N. T. Wright has argued against this, saying that the "position is quite clear: God in His great love has made one way of salvation for all men without exception. Those who refuse this way have no alternative left to them. And accepting the way of salvation, for John as for Paul, is bound up with faith in Jesus Christ."

==== Purpose ====
Theologians have assumed the verse's purpose to be that of strengthening the faith of Christians rather than as an evangelical tool. This is because John 3:16 does not contain commands of vital sacraments (such as repentance and baptism). In the words of theologian David Pawson, it is problematic to use a verse in evangelism that does not tell the hearers "how to respond in proper detail ... that you get a simple decision which is not enough for a real change in life ... It is not dealing with a gospel situation and outward evangelistic thrust". Instead, the emphasis of the verse is toward continuing belief for Christians.

==== Christian commentary ====
"The reward for faith is beyond our comprehension ... For if the Father has given everything he has to the Son, and the Father has eternal life, then he has given to the Son to be eternal life ... Whoever believes in the Son has that toward which he tends, that is, the Son, in whom he believes. But the Son is eternal life; therefore, whoever believes in him has eternal life."

— Thomas Aquinas, a Catholic philosopher

John 3:16 has been popular for theology comments. In evangelist Andreas J. Köstenberger's opinion, the verse summarizes central teachings in Christianity that are to put beliefs in Jesus, and "there is no middle ground: believing in the Son (resulting in eternal life) or refusing to believe (resulting in destruction) are the only options." Christian philosopher William Lane Craig said the verse denotes salvation through Jesus only. According to theologian Paul T. Butler: "God, motivated by infinite love, sent His only son ... not to condemn but to save everyone who believes in His Son ... This text shows God loving us, not for His sake alone, but for our sakes."

Biblical scholar F. F. Bruce interpreted John 3:16 that God has a limitless and universal love to all humans. Barrett noted that the salvation would only be advantageous whenever there is a belief in Jesus. Calvinist theologian D. A. Carson said the verse "makes it clear that, as applied to human beings, the love of God is not the consequence of their loveliness but of the sublime truth that 'God is love'." Theologian Robert E. Webber described it as "an invitation to embrace a sweeping story that encompassed the whole of history". Bible commentator J. Ramsey Michaels wrote: "God's intent is a saving intent, and the scope of his salvation is worldwide. His love for the whole human race expressed itself in the giving of his only Son [who would] die on the cross."

Bruce Vawter, a Catholic priest, stated: "The only explanation that we shall ever have of the gift of eternal life made possible for us in the redemption achieved in Christ is the incredible love of God for the world." Anglican priest Leon Morris compared the idea of God's universal love with God's exclusive love to Jews, which is frequently mentioned in the Old Testament. He then concluded that "it is a distinctively Christian idea that God's love is wide enough to embrace all mankind. His love is not confined to any national group or any spiritual elite. It is a love which proceeds from the fact that He is love." Presbyterian pastor Lamar Williamson found that John 3:16 emphasises the significance of Jesus in Christianity as God the Son. Catholic theologian Neal M. Flanagan said that the verse is pivotal to the Johannine theology.

==== Status as Jesus' words ====
Beginning in John 3:21, the conversation becomes Jesus' monologue. Because ancient Bible copies do not use quotation marks for dialogues, biblical scholars have disputed on where Jesus and Nicodemus' conversation ends. Speculations that John 3:16 is the personal commentary of an evangelist (traditionally named John the Evangelist) have arisen, but it remains controversial. Pawson said it is unusual for Jesus to speak from the third-person perspective, or to repeat or expand on what he had said. Jesus never referred to himself as the "only begotten Son" but as the "Son of Man". The only begotten son is what the evangelist calls Jesus in John 1. Theologian Robert E. Van Voorst has commented that it is not important to know if John 3:16 is Jesus's words, and that words not spoken by Jesus are no less true than those that are.

=== Wording ===
John 3:16's wording is deemed by Bible commentators to be straightforward, concise, and authoritative. The verse is only 25 words long in the King James Version. First, the verse begins with for to link with prior verse. God here is understood to be God the Father, the first person in the Trinity. The word so—similar to thus—shows a comparison from John 3:15. This is not a quantity but was mistranslated as such in most modern translations (for instance, in the Amplified Bible). Many scholars said the word should be placed near the beginning to keep the original meaning, as was in Koine Greek, the original Bible language:

Οὕτως γὰρ ἠγάπησεν ὁ θεὸς τὸν κόσμον, ὥστε τὸν υἱὸν τὸν μονογενῆ ἔδωκεν, ἵνα πᾶς ὁ πιστεύων εἰς αὐτὸν μὴ ἀπόληται ἀλλ᾽ ἔχῃ ζωὴν αἰώνιον.
Thus for loved God the world that the Son the only begotten, He gave so that everyone believing in Him not should perish but should have life eternal.

The next word is loved, known in Greek as agape. This concept does not have an equal word in English, but it can be translated as the selfless, nonsexual love of God for human and of human for God. While some theologians have argued that world refers to only Israel, other theologians have generally agreed that it means the entire human race, showing God's unlimited and universal love for both believers and unbelievers. Pawson suggested there should be a better alternative to world, because he thought it connotes an immoral meaning. Sharing similar sentiments, Harris remarked, "Often in this Gospel there are ominous, negative ideas attaching to the term. The world is evil and needs a saviour." The verb gave, in past tense, does not have a clear subject; Pawson assumed that the word refers to the prior world.

The word whosoever refers to believers, specified by "believeth in Him". Whether the objective pronoun Him refers to Jesus or God the Father is debated; general consensus among the analysts is more inclined to the former. The word perish is interpreted by theologians as annihilation, though it is unclear if the word refers the perishing of death or the Last Judgement. Köstenberger stated perish meant living eternally in God's absence, and Pawson stated it as "a state of ruin or utter uselessness". The meaning of everlasting has been controversial. Theologian Marianne Thompson said it does not mean solely "unending: it is qualitatively different from mortal life in the present world, because it participates in the blessings of the coming age, including being with God, who is living and eternal ... such life is characterized by fullness and abundance"; though according to the New Testament professor Merrill C. Tenney the word refers to imperishability.

==== "Only begotten" ====
The Gospel of John uses lexically and syntactically unsophisticated language, and has a significant number of theologically laden phrases that have become an important part of Christianity. John 3:16 also contains the designation for Jesus as the "only begotten", a key Christological title in the pre-modern versions of the English Bible, which has almost completely disappeared from most contemporary translations. The original word, monogens, has a complex etymological analysis, and there is no consensus among scholars on its exact development and meaning. The phrase "only begotten" is traceable to the Latin translation made by the Church Father Jerome in the late fourth century called the Biblia vulgata. Jerome translated the Greek adjective monogens into the Latin cognate unigenitus, which recurred in English translations as "only begotten" for almost six centuries.

The "only begotten Son" shows a deep relationship between God the Father and God the Son (Jesus). However, post-1950s translations changed it to "only Son" or "one and only Son"; this met criticism for setting aside the virgin birth of Jesus to his mother Mary. Dale Moody of the Journal of Biblical Literature offered two alternatives for John 3:16: "Only one of his kind" (from μονος [monos, one] and γένος [genos, kind]), or "his 'unique' son". The author Paul Borthwick wrote "only begotten Son" signifies that Jesus possesses "every artibute of pure Godhood"; Pawson, however, argued that the phrase stated Jesus is not everlasting. (Note: In Christian theology, Jesus holds the same position along with God the Father and God the Holy Spirit. This concept is known as the Trinity, which states that God is one but exists co-equally, co-eternally, and co-substantially as the three aforementioned persons; each person, however, is distinct from the others. In John 3:16, the relationship between God the Father and Jesus, also referred to as God the Son, is shown. The addition of "begotten"—which purposely asserts that Jesus' life started after his virgin birth—is considered a contradiction of the doctrine, since it does not affirm that Jesus is also self-existent together with God the Father and God the Holy Spirit.) Theologian Pheme Perkins believed the phrase "He gave His only begotten Son" could be a reference to his later crucifixion, an opinion shared by Murray J. Harris and Robert E. Van Voorst.

=== Muslim commentary ===
The validity of Jesus' status as the "only begotten son" of God, as described in John 3:16, has been disputed by Muslim scholars especially, who deny the Trinity and consider such concepts as a denial of tawhid (oneness of God). Gombe State University's Yakubu Modibbo and University of Maiduguri's Dani Mamman claimed other verses from the Bible that, they believed, are an affirmation of other "begotten sons" of God, and thus contradict Jesus' words or John's commentary; Psalms 2:7 for example, which reads, "I will tell of the decree: The Lord said to me, 'You are my Son; today I have begotten you'." They added that, despite unambiguous, "Christians still regards all the biblical sons of God as adopted sons by God, through faith in Jesus." However, the Christian apologist A. Yousef Al-Katib wrote that it is actually a reference to the coming son of God, who in Christian theology is identified as Jesus; he also wrote of Acts 13:33 that quotes the verse to prove Jesus' divine sonship.

== Influences ==
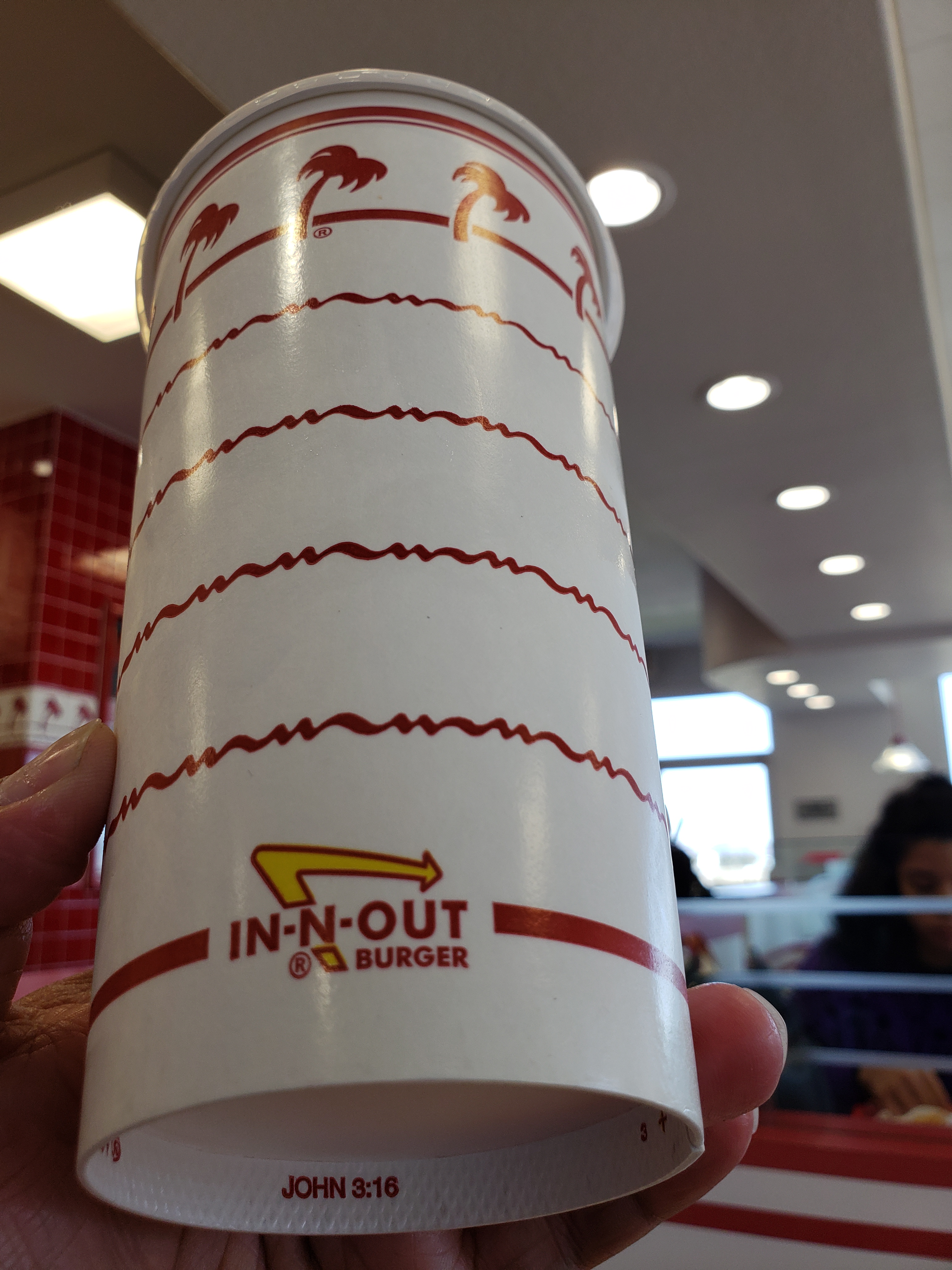
The bottom of a paper cup from In-N-Out Burger featuring "JOHN 3:16".

John 3:16 is considered to be a popular Bible verse and acknowledged as a summary of the gospel. In the United States, the verse is often used by preachers during sermons and widely memorized among evangelical churches' members. 16th-century German Protestant theologian Martin Luther said the verse is "the gospel in miniature". The author Max Lucado, who described the verse as "a twenty-[five] word parade of hope", wrote in 2007 that the conciseness of the verse made it easy to remember. In 2014, John 3:16 was among the ten most-searched verses on BibleGateway.com, a popular Bible website. In a 2017 report by Christianity Today, the verse was a popular choice for passwords.

"The text ... has been used by various Christian groups as a gospel in miniature because it provides a type of summary for the entire gospel ... You have seen 3:16 on billboards or banners during national televised events because [they] rightly see it as an inexpensive means of mass evangelisation. Due to the millions of people who watch such events, they have been savvy in their communication skills in reaching larger audiences."

— Judith Schubert in 2016

The verse has been frequently referenced by consumer products and public figures. In the United States, where Christianity is dominant, evangelists often write "John 3:16" on signs and walls to attract people's attention. Voorst added, "They hope that some people will recognise as a Bible reference, look up the verse, and come to faith in Jesus Christ." The American footballer Tim Tebow wrote John 3:16 on the eye black during the 2009 BCS National Championship Game, making it the most popular search term for more than 24 hours. The verse has been printed on the shopping bags by Forever 21 fashion retailer and on paper cups' bottom by In-N-Out Burger fast-food chain. An American denim brand was named 3sixteen to show that its "foundation is in our faith". In 1996, professional wrestler Stone Cold Steve Austin referenced the verse in a promo to Jake "The Snake" Roberts (who had a preacher gimmick at the time) after defeating him during WWF's King of the Ring event, famously ad-libbing to Roberts that "Austin 3:16 says I just whipped your ass!" The "Austin 3:16" promo would go on to become one of the catalysts for Austin's early popularity, and became one of wrestling's best known catchphrases.

Many books have been written that are based on John 3:16. Lutheran computer scientist Donald Knuth published 3:16 Bible Texts Illuminated in 1991, examining and illustrating the sixteenth verse of every third chapter in biblical books. In 2009, Lucado wrote 3:16: The Numbers of Hope, where portions of the verse are titled in its chapters. Pawson wrote Is John 3:16 the Gospel?, analyzing every word and grammatical structure and remarking it is the "most misunderstood verse". John 3:16: What's It All About? and Mission 3:16, were written by Harris in 2015 and Borthwick in 2020, respectively.

== See also ==
- Sola fide – Christian theological doctrine
- Legalism (theology) – Pejorative for performative Christianity

== Bibliography ==
- Al-Katib, A. Yousef (4 February 2014). H. M. Baagil's Muslim-Christian Dialogue: A Reply, Refutation and Rebuttal. TellerBooks. ISBN 978-09-84518-27-2.
- Aquinas, Thomas (August 2010). Commentary on the Gospel of John: Chapters 1–5. Catholic University of America Press. ISBN 978-08-13217-23-9.
- Avent, Paul (28 September 2010). Study John's Gospel. Xlibris US. ISBN 978-14-53570-17-3.
- Barrett, C. K. (1956). The Gospel According to St. John: An Introduction with Commentary and Notes on the Greek Text. S. P. C. K. OCLC 1000558270.
- Borthwick, Paul (9 June 2020). Mission 3:16: God's One-Verse Invitation to Love the World. InterVarsity Press. ISBN 978-08-30836-89-5.
- Brown, Raymond E. (1966). The Gospel According to John. Doubleday. ISBN 978-03-85015-17-2.
- Brown, Raymond E. (1988). The Gospel and Epistles of John: A Concise Commentary. Liturgical Press. ISBN 0-8146-1283-0.
- Brown, Raymond E. (May 2003). An Introduction to the Gospel of John. Doubleday. ISBN 0-385-50722-4.
- Bruce, F. F. (1983). The Gospel of John: Introduction, Exposition and Notes by F. F. Bruce. Marshall Pickering. ISBN 0-8028-3407-8.
- Bruner, F. Dale (22 February 2012). The Gospel of John: A Commentary. William B. Eerdmans Publishing Company. ISBN 978-08-02866-35-6.
- Butler, Paul T. (1961). The Gospel of John: A New Commentary, Workbook, Teaching Manual. College Press. OCLC 982697866.
- Carson, D. A. (1991). The Gospel According to John. Inter-Varsity Press. ISBN 978-08-51117-49-2.
- DeRuvo, Fred (2 April 2009). Interpreting the Bible Literally: Is Not As Confusing As It Sounds. Adroit Ventures. ISBN 978-14-41487-56-8.
- Harris, Mark W. (9 December 2003). Historical Dictionary of Unitarian Universalism. Scarecrow Press. ISBN 978-08-10865-80-8.
- Harris, Murray J. (10 June 2015). John 3:16: What's It All About?. Wipf and Stock. ISBN 978-14-98224-08-6.
- Hurtado, Larry (2005). Lord Jesus Christ: Devotion to Jesus in Earliest Christianity. William B. Eerdmans Publishing Company. ISBN 978-08-02831-67-5.
- Knuth, Donald (1991). 3:16: Bible Texts Illuminated. A-R Editions. ISBN 978-08-95792-52-5.
- Köstenberger, Andreas J. (2004). John: Baker Exegetical Commentary on the New Testament. Baker Publishing Group. ISBN 978-08-01026-44-7.
- Köstenberger, Andreas J. (31 March 2020). The Jesus of the Gospels: An Introduction. Kregel Publications. ISBN 978-08-25445-36-1.
- Kruse, Colin G. (2004). The Gospel According to John: An Introduction and Commentary. William B. Eerdmans Publishing Company. ISBN 0-8028-2771-3.
- Lewis, Scott M. (2005). The Gospel According to John and the Johannine Letters. Liturgical Press. ISBN 978-08-14628-63-8.
- Lucado, Max (11 September 2007). 3:16: The Numbers of Hope. Thomas Nelson. ISBN 978-08-49963-93-3.
- Michaels, J. Ramsey (1995). New International Biblical Commentary: John. Hendrickson Publishers. ISBN 0-85364-658-9.
- Morris, Leon (1971). The Gospel According to John. New International Commentary on the New Testament. William B. Eerdmans Publishing Company. ISBN 978-0-8028-2504-9.
- Palmer, Earl F. (1978). The Intimate Gospel: Studies in John. Word Incorporated. ISBN 0-8499-0101-4.
- Pawson, David (2003). Unlocking the Bible: A Unique Overview of the Whole Bible. HarperCollins. ISBN 978-0-007166-66-4.
- Pawson, David (3 October 2014). Is John 3:16 the Gospel?. Anchor Recordings. ISBN 978-19-09886-62-9.
- Rainbow, Paul A. (5 September 2014). Johannine Theology: The Gospel, the Epistles and the Apocalypse. InterVarsity Press. ISBN 978-08-30896-50-9.
- Ralph, Margaret Nutting (2003). And God Said What?: An Introduction to Biblical Literary Forms. Paulist Press. ISBN 978-08-09141-29-6.
- Schubert, Judith (23 August 2016). The Gospel of John: Question by Question. Wipf and Stock. ISBN 978-17-25237-41-4.
- Sklba, Richard J.; Juknialis, Joseph (22 February 2016). Easter Fire: Fire Starters for the Easter Weekday Homily. Liturgical Press. ISBN 978-08-14648-91-9.
- Solomon, Robert M. (2011). The Enduring Word: The Authority and Reliability of the Bible. Genesis Books. ISBN 978-98-14305-46-4.
- Tenney, Merrill C. (1995). The Expositor's Bible Commentary with the New International Version. Zondervan. ISBN 0-310-50011-7.
- Thompson, Marianne (2015). John: A Commentary. Westminster John Knox Press. ISBN 978-0-664-22111-9.
- Voorst, Robert E. Van (2017). Commonly Misunderstood Verses of the Bible: What They Really Mean. Cascade Books. ISBN 978-15-32610-27-1.
- Webber, Robert E. (November 2003). Ancient-Future Evangelism (Ancient-Future): Making Your Church a Faith-Forming Community. Baker Publishing Group. ISBN 978-14-41242-10-5.
- Williamson, Lamar (2004). Preaching the Gospel of John: Proclaiming the Living Word. Presbyterian Publishing Corporation. ISBN 978-06-64225-33-9.

Book chapters

- Flanagan, Neal M. (1992). "John". In Karris, Robert J. (ed.). The Collegeville Bible Commentary: Based on the New American Bible. Liturgical Press. ISBN 0-8146-2211-9.
- Forestell, J. Terence (1968). "Proverbs". In Brown, Raymond E.; Fitzmyer, Joseph A.; Murphy, Roland E. (eds.). Jerome Biblical Commentary. Prentice Hall. ISBN 978-01-35096-12-3.
- Kieffer, René (2001). "60. John". In Barton, John; Muddiman, John (eds.). The Oxford Bible Commentary. Oxford University Press. ISBN 0-19-875500-7.
- Okure, Teresa (1998). "John". In Farmer, William R.; LaCocque, Andre; Levoratti, Armando; Dungan, David Laird (eds.). The International Bible Commentary. Liturgical Press. ISBN 978-08-14624-54-8.
- Perkins, Pheme (1990). "The Gospel According to John". In Brown, Raymond E.; Fitzmyer, Joseph A.; Murphy, Roland E. (eds.). New Jerome Biblical Commentary. Prentice Hall. ISBN 0-13-614934-0.
- Vawter, Bruce (1968). "The Gospel According to Matthew". In Brown, Raymond E.; Fitzmyer, Joseph A.; Murphy, Roland E. (eds.). Jerome Biblical Commentary. Prentice Hall. ISBN 978-01-35096-12-3.
- Viviano, Benedict T. (1990). "The Gospel According to Matthew". In Brown, Raymond E.; Fitzmyer, Joseph A.; Murphy, Roland E. (eds.). New Jerome Biblical Commentary. Prentice Hall. ISBN 0-13-614934-0.
