= University Presbyterian Church =

University Presbyterian Church may refer to:

- University Presbyterian Church (Buffalo, New York), listed on the U.S. National Register of Historic Places.
- University Presbyterian Church (Seattle, Washington), church in USA
- University Presbyterian Church and Student Center, church in Madison, Wisconsin, USA
