= Gott liebt diese Welt =

1962 Christian hymn

- Christian hymn
- Key: C major
- Written: 1962
- Text: by Walter Schulz
- Language: German
- Based on: John 3:16
- Melody: by Walter Schulz
- Composed: 1962

"Gott liebt diese Welt" (God loves this world) is a Christian hymn with words in German written by Walter Schulz in 1962, who added one additional verse in 1970. It expresses God's love for the world, expanding on John 3:16. The hymn was originally written for a Protestant youth gathering in East Germany, intended as an encouragement in difficult times after the erection of the Berlin Wall. It appeared in Protestant and Catholic hymnals, and other songbooks.

== Background and history ==
Walter Schulz was a Protestant pastor who served from 1956 as Landesjugendpastor (state youth pastor) for the Evangelisch-Lutherische Landeskirche Mecklenburgs. In that function, he wrote the text of "Gott liebt diese Welt" in 1962 for a Protestant youth gathering (Evangelischer Jugendtag) in Schwerin. A year after the Berlin Wall was built, he faced suppression and criticism of Christian beliefs by the regime of East Germany. He was interested in putting out a message of encouragement.

The song became part of the Protestant hymnal Evangelisches Gesangbuch as EG 409, and of the Catholic hymnal Gotteslob as GL 464. The hymn is also part of other songbooks, including ecumenical collections and books for young people.

== Theme and text ==
The words of the hymn are in eight stanzas of five lines each, with the final stanza being a repetition of the first. It follows a strict formal scheme: the first line of each stanza is "Gott liebt diese Welt"; in the two framing stanzas this line is repeated at the end, while the last line similarly often begins with "Gott" and always ends with "Welt". The rhyme scheme is ABABA. The song, written in the first-person plural, expresses God's love of the world and especially of "us" people, following a verse from the Gospel of John, "God so loved the world" (John 3:16). The inner lines name ways of this love.

== Melody and music ==
The melody begins like a fanfare with a downward triad seemingly in a major key but moves to the minor mode and church keys.

Klaus Wallrath composed a Liedermotette Gott liebt diese Welt in 2014, setting the full text for mixed choir, organ and brass.

== Usage ==
The hymn was used as the title of a collection of choral music for church services and secular use, containing 50 settings for a convention of youth choirs in 2015. It was published by Bärenreiter.
