= Begotten =

Begotten may refer to:

== Religion ==
- Only-begotten Son
- Monogenēs, only begotten in the New Testament and Christian theology

== Film and TV ==
- Begotten, a 1989 experimental horror film written, edited, produced, and directed by E. Elias Merhige
- "The Begotten", a 1997 episode of the television series Star Trek: Deep Space Nine

== Books ==
- "The Begotten", poem by James L. McMichael
- Star Begotten, 1937 novel by H. G. Wells
- Only Begotten Daughter, 1990 fantasy novel written by James Morrow
