= Earl F. Palmer =

American Presbyterian minister (1931–2023)

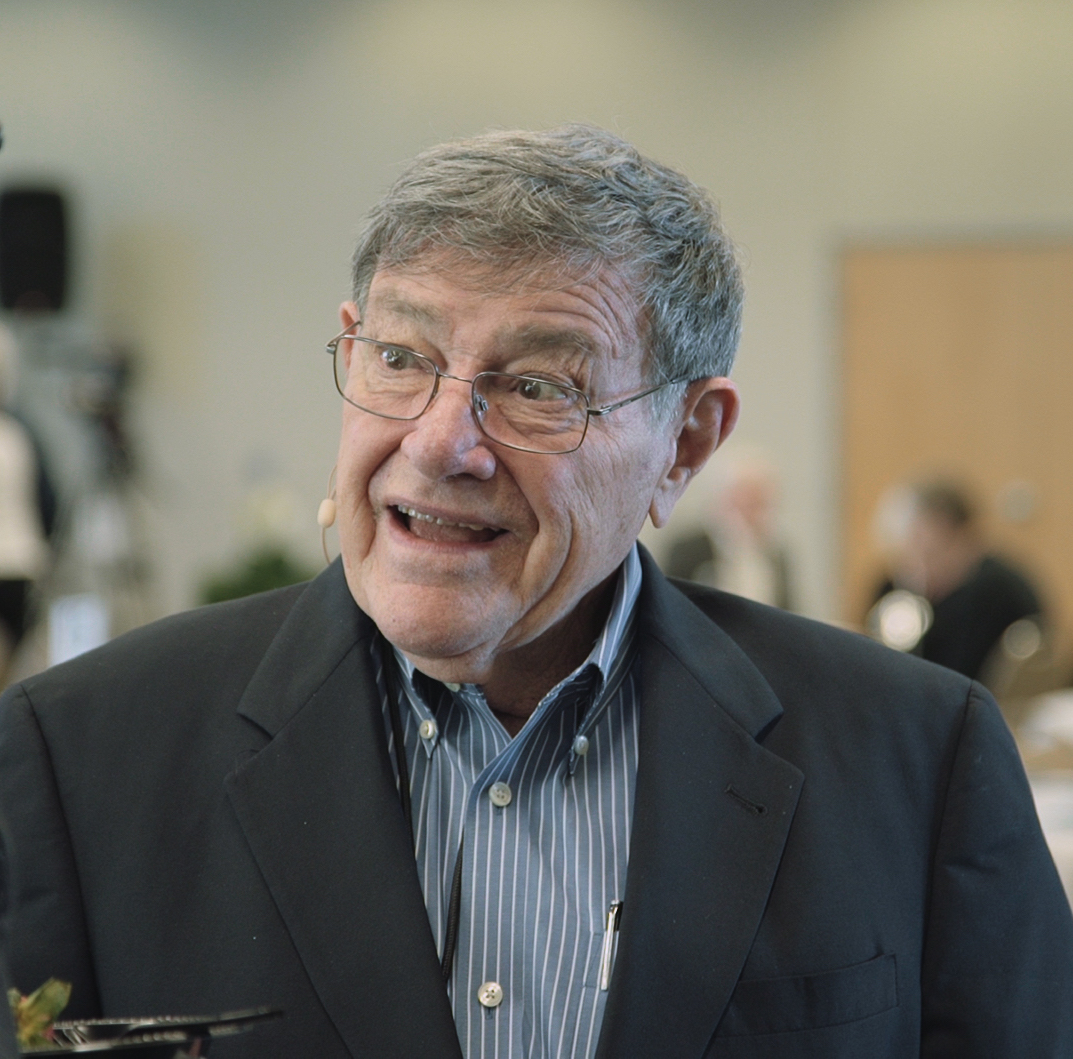
- Born: November 26, 1931; McCloud, California, U.S.
- Died: April 25, 2023 (aged 91)
- Occupation: Presbyterian minister
- Spouse: Shirley Palmer
- Children: 3
- Website: earlpalmer.org

Earl Frank Palmer (November 26, 1931 – April 25, 2023) was an American Presbyterian minister. He served in pastoral ministries at University Presbyterian Church in Seattle, Union Church in Manila, First Presbyterian Church of Berkeley, and The National Presbyterian Church in Washington, D.C. Palmer was known for his expositional preaching and teaching style. He had a strong interest in pursuing theological themes that are present in classic and contemporary literature, with focus on authors such as C.S. Lewis, J.R.R. Tolkien, Karl Barth, and Dietrich Bonhoeffer. Palmer wrote over 20 books, and served on the boards of Princeton Theological Seminary, New College Berkeley, Whitworth University and Regent College.

== Early life ==
Palmer was born in McCloud, California to parents, Lewis Ward Palmer and Myrtle Elizabeth Hovey Palmer. He was named after his uncle, Earl and his grandfather, Frank Hovey, who drove the Wells Fargo Stage Coach on the mountain trail from Northern California to Southern Oregon. The second of four children, he joined his older brother, Lewis Ward Jr. and was joined later with the birth of two sisters, Nancy Elizabeth and Marian Lee. Palmer was baptized as an infant in the Episcopal Church as in Yreka, California and in his youth attended his hometown McCloud Community Presbyterian Church just up the street from his home. Living in the shadow of Mount Shasta he climbed the 14,179 foot mountain over 50 times, on one occasion he climbed it twice in one day. For his summer work during college he worked as a compass man for the McCloud River Lumber Company throughout the Northern California forests.

== Education ==
Palmer graduated from University of California, Berkeley with a bachelor of arts in political science as a pre-law major in 1953. As a sophomore, it was through a men's Bible study in his dorm that led him to make a commitment to the Christian Church. He became an active member of the fellowship at First Presbyterian Church. In his senior year, he met with Dr. Robert Boyd Munger and shared that he was thinking about being a minister. This pastor encouraged Palmer to consider Princeton Theological Seminary where he eventually earned his Bachelor of Divinity Degree in 1956 (now defined as a Master of Divinity). Palmer also received honorary doctorates from Seattle Pacific University and Whitworth University.

== Ministry career ==
=== University Presbyterian Church ===
Upon graduation in 1956 from Princeton Theological Seminary, Palmer accepted the position as pastor to high school and college students at University Presbyterian Church (UPC) in Seattle. He later returned to Seattle in 1991 when he received the call to be Senior Pastor at UPC.

=== Union Church of Manila ===
In March of 1964, Palmer was called to be the pastor of Union Church in Manila – a post he held for the next 6 years. Palmer claims that, "the Manila years were deeply formative as I learned to preach to an international community and serve as a solo pastor to a congregation of over five hundred." His time there also included a teaching post at Union Theological Seminary in the Cavite Province with an opportunity every week to explore the New Testament with the students. In 1969 he was invited by the Navy Chaplains of the Seventh Fleet assigned to Vietnam to travel to Saigon and DaNang to meet with them as they served in the Vietnam War.

=== First Presbyterian Church of Berkeley ===
Palmer and his family returned to the United States from Manila in response to the call in 1970 to be pastor at First Presbyterian Church of Berkeley (FPCB). There, Palmer met the challenge that he describes as "turbulent" due to political and social unrest amongst Berkeley students. His 21 years there were spent ministering to those students and the congregation at large. Palmer also travelled with his family to do ministry in South Africa, Australia, South East Asia, China, Russia and Europe.

=== New College Berkeley ===
While at Berkeley, Palmer, along with David W. Gill, co-founded an interdenominational graduate school of theology for laypersons. New College for Advanced Christian Studies, later renamed New College Berkeley, was founded in 1977.

=== National Presbyterian Church ===
In the fall of 2008, 10 days after he retired from University Presbyterian Church, he boarded a plane and headed to Washington D.C. to serve as Preaching Pastor in Residence at The National Presbyterian Church. Palmer had the opportunity to connect with many Christian organizations speaking at retreats and events in the area surrounding the nation's capital. He returned to his home in Seattle in June of 2010.

=== Earl Palmer Ministries ===
When Palmer retired from University Presbyterian Church in 2008, a group of individuals encouraged Palmer to remain active and founded Earl Palmer Ministries (EPM), a not for profit organization created with the goal of continuing Palmer's activities as a teacher and preacher. EPM seeks to mentor young theologians through an internship program and monthly theological dialogues, produce live podcasts through the Kindlings Muse and offer regular teaching and conversation for all ages to consider major Christian themes. EPM also puts on Word and Worship to provide a setting for expositional teaching of the Bible and music. Earl Palmer Ministries‘ wider ministry focuses primarily on encouraging pastors and giving a case for expositional worship. The idea for Earl Palmer Ministries was borne from the example of John Stott Ministries, founded in order for the late John Stott to continue doing ministry after he retired from the pulpit.

=== Later life ===
As of 2020, Palmer remained actively involved in ministry through EPM and as an expositor of the Bible and authors such as C.S. Lewis, Karl Barth, Dietrich Bonhoeffer, J.R.R. Tolkien, George Herbert as well as many others. He continued to preach, write and teach in the Seattle area and around the world.

== Personal life ==
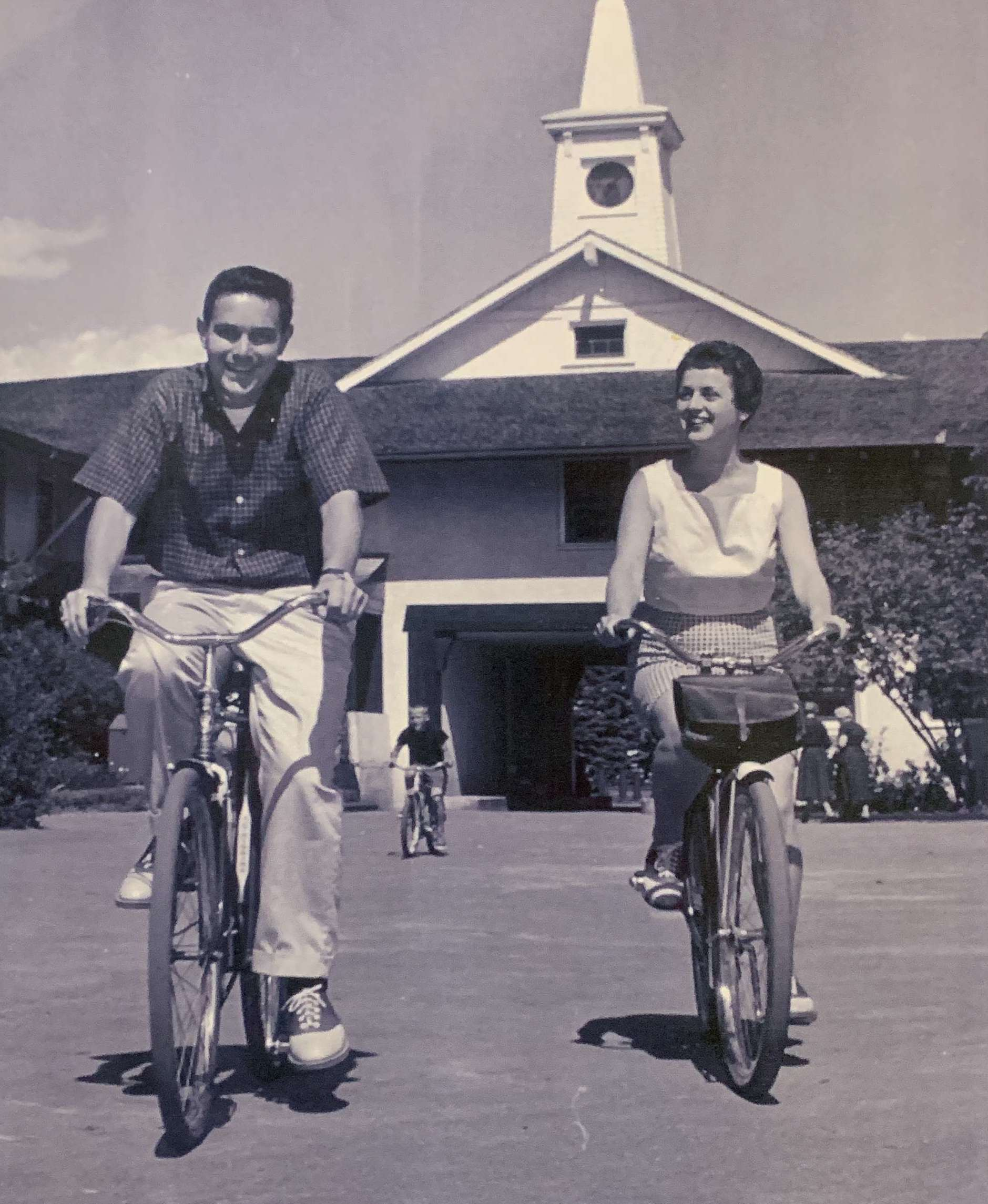
Earl and Shirley Palmer

Palmer met Shirley Green Palmer in Seattle and asked her to be his wife. According to Palmer, "it was love at first sight" and they were married on June 14, 1958. They welcomed their first child in 1962. While in Manila from 1964-1970, they had their second and third children. While Palmer was developing his skills as a pastor, Shirley, with her education in public health, reached out to the rural barrios and worked with the families to improve nutrition under the auspices of the World Health Organization teaching cooking classes using local foods and encouraging young mothers in the care of their children. She worked as junior high counselor at The American School of Manila as well as providing hospitality for the church community in their home located next door to the sanctuary. While living in the San Francisco-East Bay area Shirley returned to her field to combine her public health background and her educational credentials to become Supervisor of Health Services, Curriculum and Programs in the Richmond Unified School District. While Palmer was Senior Pastor in Seattle, his children left for college and married, Shirley returned to graduate school and earned her Ph.D. in Organizational Theory/Analysis in the College of Education and Department of Leadership and Policy Studies from the University of Washington in 2002. Earl lived with his wife Shirley in Seattle, Washington, and their three adult children and eight grandchildren live nearby.

Earl F. Palmer died on April 25, 2023, at the age of 91.

== Legacy ==
=== The Earl Palmer Collection ===
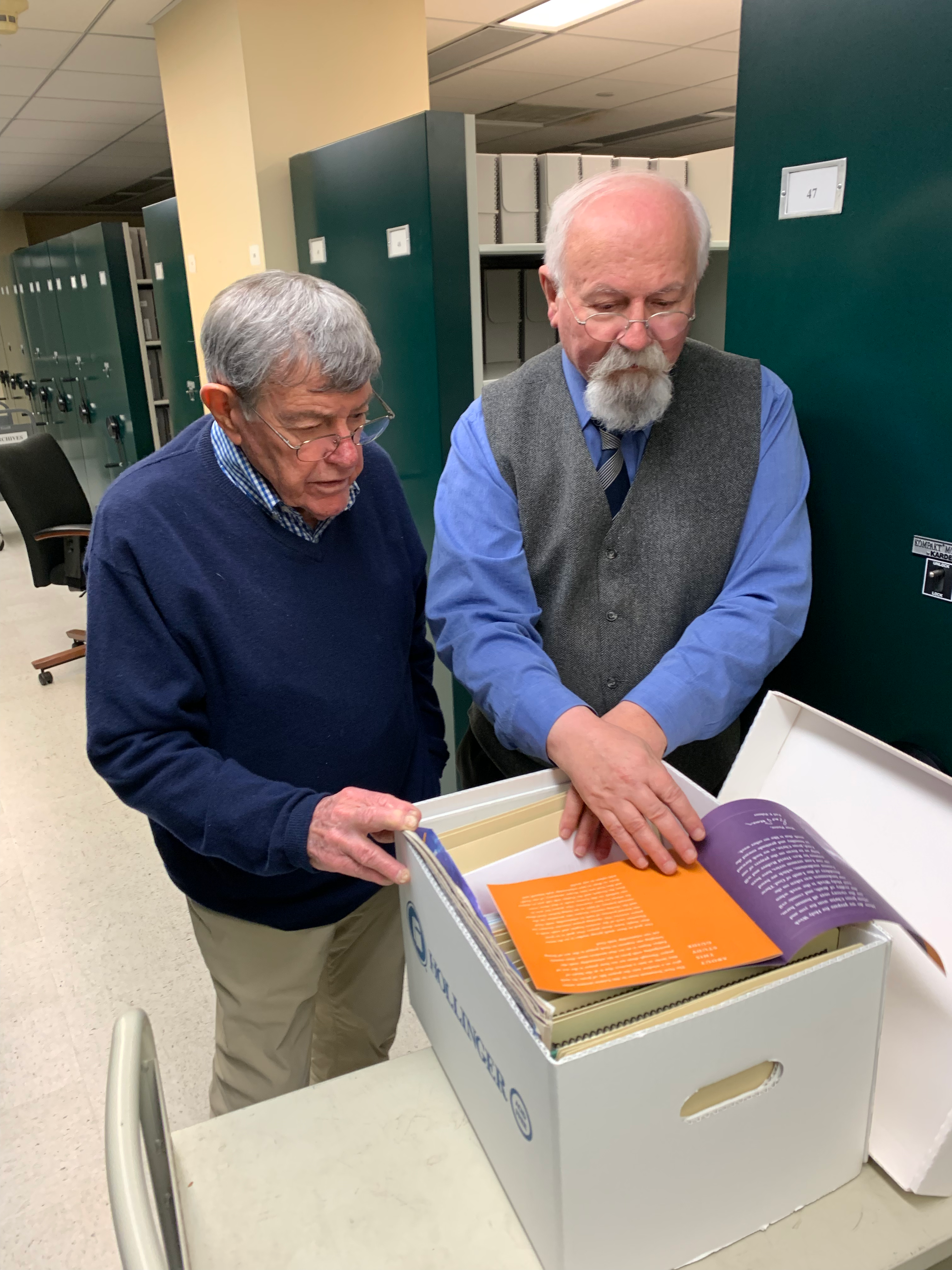
Earl with Kenneth Henke (Special Collections director at PTS) in the PTS Library's climate-controlled archival vault.

The Earl Palmer Collection within the Theological Commons at the Princeton Theological Seminary Library represents a collaboration between Earl Palmer Ministries and Princeton Theological Seminary. This collection contains over 3500 audio and video recordings and selected writings by Palmer, an alumnus and former member of the Board of Trustees of Princeton Theological Seminary. For years, Palmer‘s study assistants, family members, friends, and staff at the seminary's library helped in the collection, organization and archival of almost all of Palmer‘s work over his 65+ years in ministry. The physical and digital materials are stored in state of the art cloud servers, and temperature controlled archival rooms.

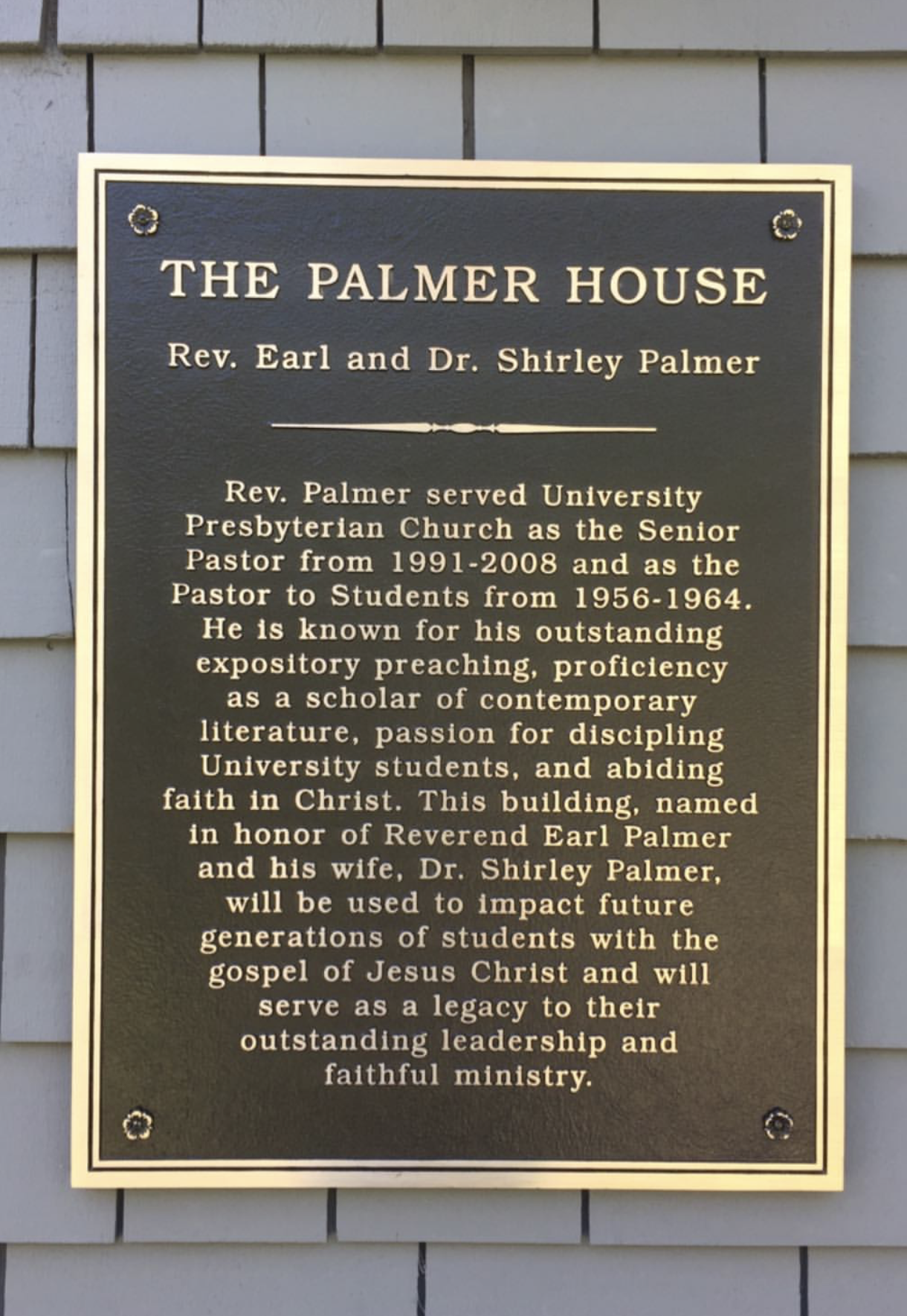
This plaque is fixed to the left of the main entrance to the Palmer House in Seattle Washington on the University Presbyterian Church Campus.

=== The Palmer House ===
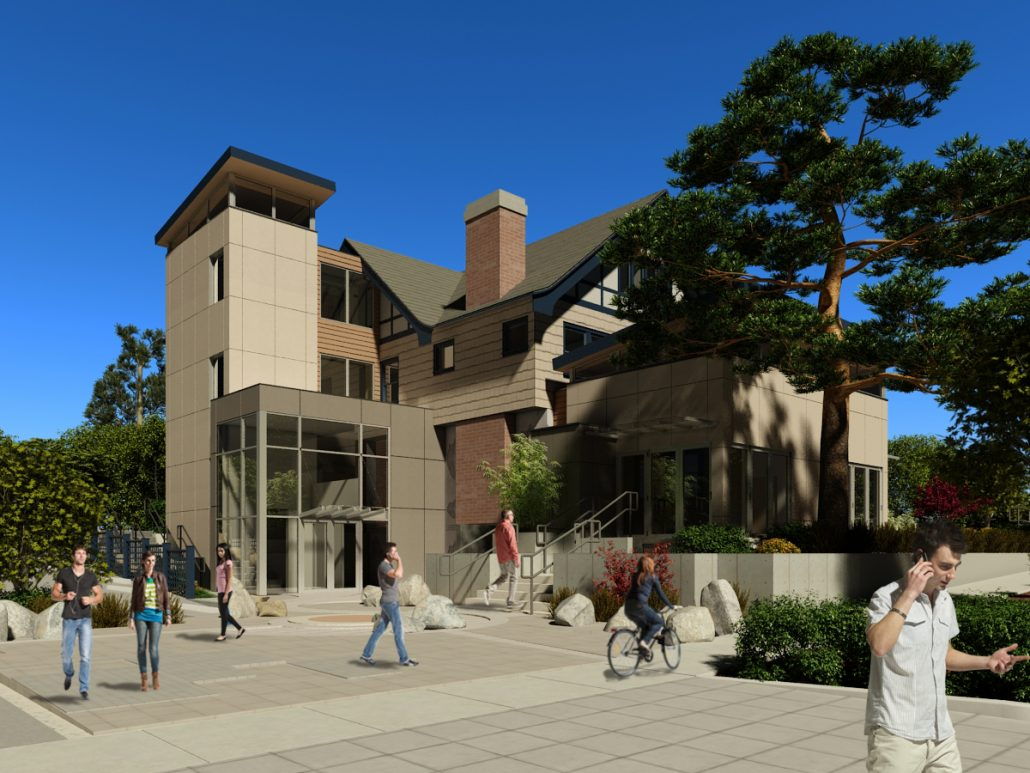
The Palmer House Exterior

Officially named The Earl and Shirley Palmer Center for Student Ministry, the Palmer House was strategically planned for 15 years, and finally completed in 2019. Earl Palmer originally had thought of creating a space where college students at the University of Washington and other surrounding universities could find home away from home. Owned by University Presbyterian Church, this building was transformed from law offices into a coffee house and community space.

Currently, the main space of the house holds the coffee bar and the larger gathering area. The second floor holds offices the college ministry at UPC, The Inn, and Young Life College. The house is managed by five female students who live in the top floor apartment. It also features a commercial grade kitchen, a conference room, a prayer room and two lounge spaces. On the front of the building, a plaque bears this inscription in honor of Earl and Shirley Palmer:

"Rev. Palmer served University Presbyterian Church as the Senior Pastor from 1991 - 2008 and as the Pastor to students from 1956 - 1964. He is known for his outstanding expository preaching, proficiency as a scholar of contemporary literature, passion for discipling University students, and abiding faith in Christ. This building, named in honor of Reverend Earl Palmer and his wife, Dr. Shirley Palmer, will be used to impact future generations of students with the gospel of Jesus Christ and will serve as a legacy to their outstanding leadership and faithful ministry."

=== The Berkeley Palmer Lectureship ===
In May of 2018, First Presbyterian Church of Berkeley and New College Berkeley launched an annual lectureship in honor of the Reverend Earl F. Palmer, pastor of First Presbyterian Church Berkeley from 1970 to 1991, and founding trustee of New College Berkeley. The Berkeley Palmer Lectureship was established to examine current biblical scholarship at the intersection of the Church and the Academy. With an inaugural lecture by Craig Barnes titled "The Temptation to Be Less Than Human", the lectureship intends to continue to bring the lens of biblical scholarship to issues of concern to universities, seminaries, and the church.

== Books ==
- Called to be a People of the Gospel: St. Paul’s New Testament Letter to the Ephesians (2023) ISBN 978-1666731125
- To Run The Race: Paul's Second Letter to Timothy (2014) ISBN 978-1573835190
- Trusting God: Christian Faith in a World of Uncertainty (2006) ISBN 978-1573833295
- The Humor of Jesus: Sources of Laughter in the Bible (2001) ISBN 978-1573831802
- The Book That John Wrote (1999) ISBN 978-1573831437
- The Book That James Wrote (1997) ISBN 978-1573832908
- Integrity in a World of Pretense: Insights From the Book of Philippians (1992) ISBN 978-0830817368
- Mastering Teaching: Mastering Ministry Series (1993) ISBN 978-0880704403
- Prayer Between Friends: Cultivating our Friendship with God (1991) ISBN 978-1573831499
- Sign Posts: Living With Christian Values in an Age of Uncertainty (1990) ISBN 978-0849932236
- Laughter in Heaven: the Parables of Jesus (1987) ISBN 978-1573832892
- The 24-Hour Christian: Sheer Encouragement for the Christian in the World (1987) ISBN 978-1573832229
- The Enormous Exception: Meeting Christ in the Sermon on the Mount (2001) ISBN 978-1573831994
- Discovering Philippians and Colossians: The Guideposts Home Bible Study Program (1986) ASIN B000EH0RHK
- In Search of a Faith That Works (1985) ISBN 978-0830708895
- Old Law, New Life: The Ten Commandments and New Testament Faith (1984) ISBN 978-0687287444
- 1 and 2 Thessalonians: A Good News Commentary (1983) ISBN 978-0060664558
- Alive from the Center (1982) ISBN 978-0849901225
- The Communicator's Commentary: 1, 2, 3 John, Revelation (1982) ISBN 978-0849901652
- The Intimate Gospel: Studies in John (1978) ISBN 978-0849901010
- Love has its reasons: An inquiry into New Testament Love (1977) ISBN 978-0876804810
- Salvation By Surprise (1975) ASIN B008I8TM8W
