= University Presbyterian Church (Buffalo, New York) =

Historic church in New York, United States

- U.S. National Register of Historic Places
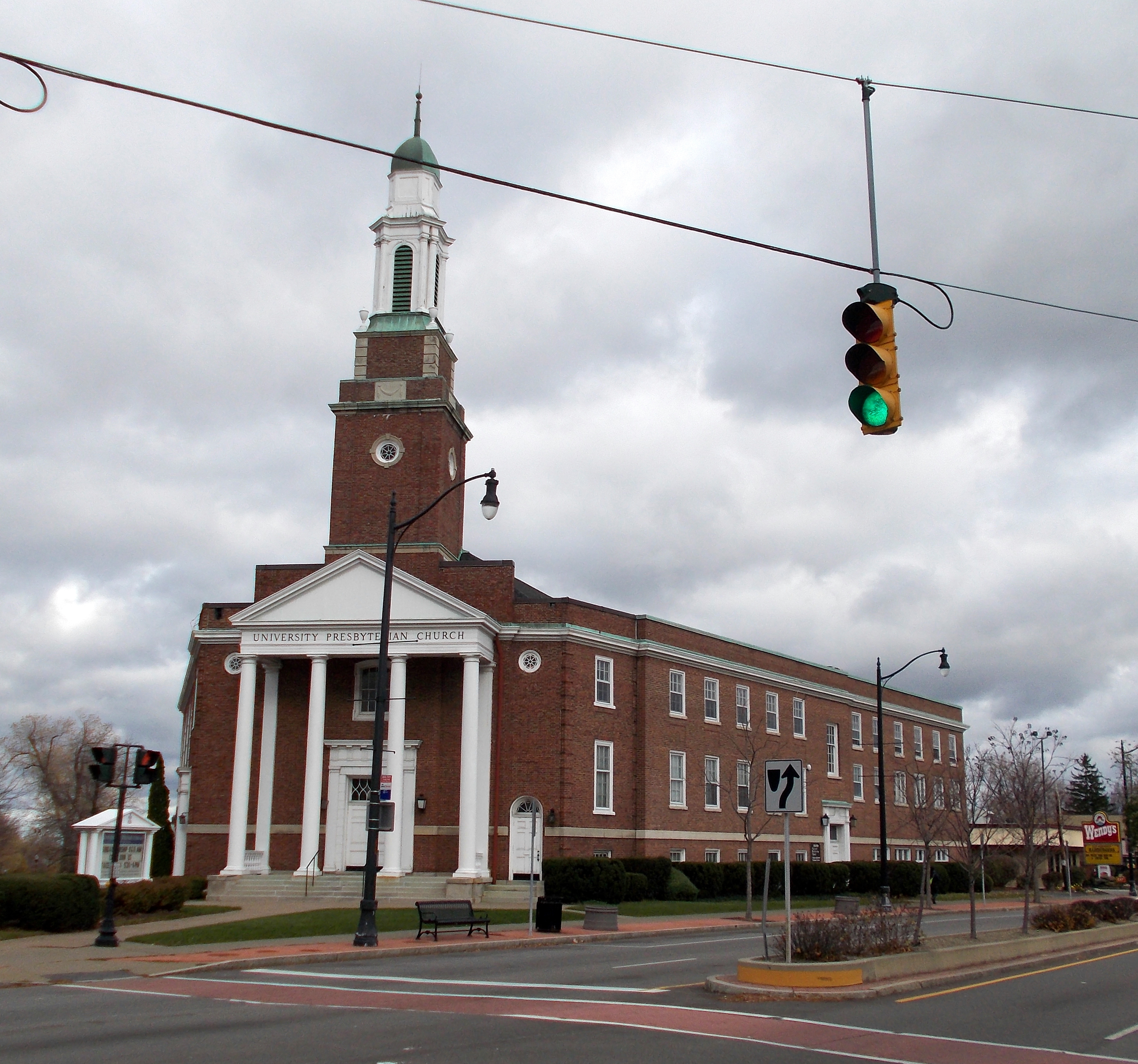
- University Presbyterian Church, November 2015

- Location within New York Location within the United States
- Location: 3330 Main St., Buffalo, New York
- Coordinates: 42°45′17″N 78°49′29″W
- Area: .77 acres (0.31 ha)
- Built: 1928, 1956
- Architect: North & Shelgren Architects/Robert E. Williams & Frederick Williams (1927 Church); Fenno-Reynolds-McNeil/Frederick Williams (1955 Classroom Addition)
- Architectural style: Colonial Revival
- NRHP reference No.: 15000820
- Added to NRHP: November 24, 2015

University Presbyterian Church is a historic Presbyterian church complex located in the University Heights neighborhood of Buffalo, Erie County, New York. The church is part of the Presbytery of Western New York which is part the Synod of the Northeast, a regional body of the Presbyterian Church (USA). It has an unusual trapezoidal-shaped plan formed by the V-shaped orientation of the original sanctuary wing (1928) and the later education wing addition (1956). The buildings are Colonial Revival style, red brick structures of the Wren-Gibbs tradition. The front facade features a two-story tetra-style pedimented portico with wood Doric order columns and a tall, Wren-Gibbs inspired tower and steeple.

It was listed on the National Register of Historic Places in 2015.
