= Presbyterian Publishing Corporation =

Publishing agency of the Presbyterian Church (USA)

- Parent company: Presbyterian Church (USA)
- Country of origin: United States
- Headquarters location: Louisville, Kentucky
- Official website: www.ppcbooks.com

The Presbyterian Publishing Corporation is a religious corporation, which is the publishing agency of the Presbyterian Church (USA). According to its official website, "The Presbyterian Publishing Corporation is one of six agencies of the Presbyterian Church (USA) but we receive no funding from the denomination, but rather contribute to the mission of the PC(USA) through our operating surpluses." Its primary unit is the publisher Westminster John Knox Press.

== Controversy ==
On July 1, 2006, the PPC published Christian Faith and the Truth Behind 9/11: A Call to Reflection and Action, a book by David Ray Griffin. The book argues that "The Bush-Cheney administration... orchestrated 9/11 in order to promote this empire under the pretext of the so-called war on terror." The book echoes other 9/11 conspiracy theories in claiming that the Bush administration used explosives to destroy the World Trade Center, and adds a theological argument that the United States is an "evil, even demonic empire" comparable to the Roman Empire. PPC President Davis Perkins claimed that the book's arguments "merit careful consideration by serious-minded Christians and Americans concerned with truth and the meaning of their faith."

Publication of this book aroused criticism of the PPC and the PC(USA) leadership by church members and clergy.
