= University Presbyterian Church (Seattle) =

Church in Seattle, Washington, United States

Coordinates: 47.663°N 122.312°W

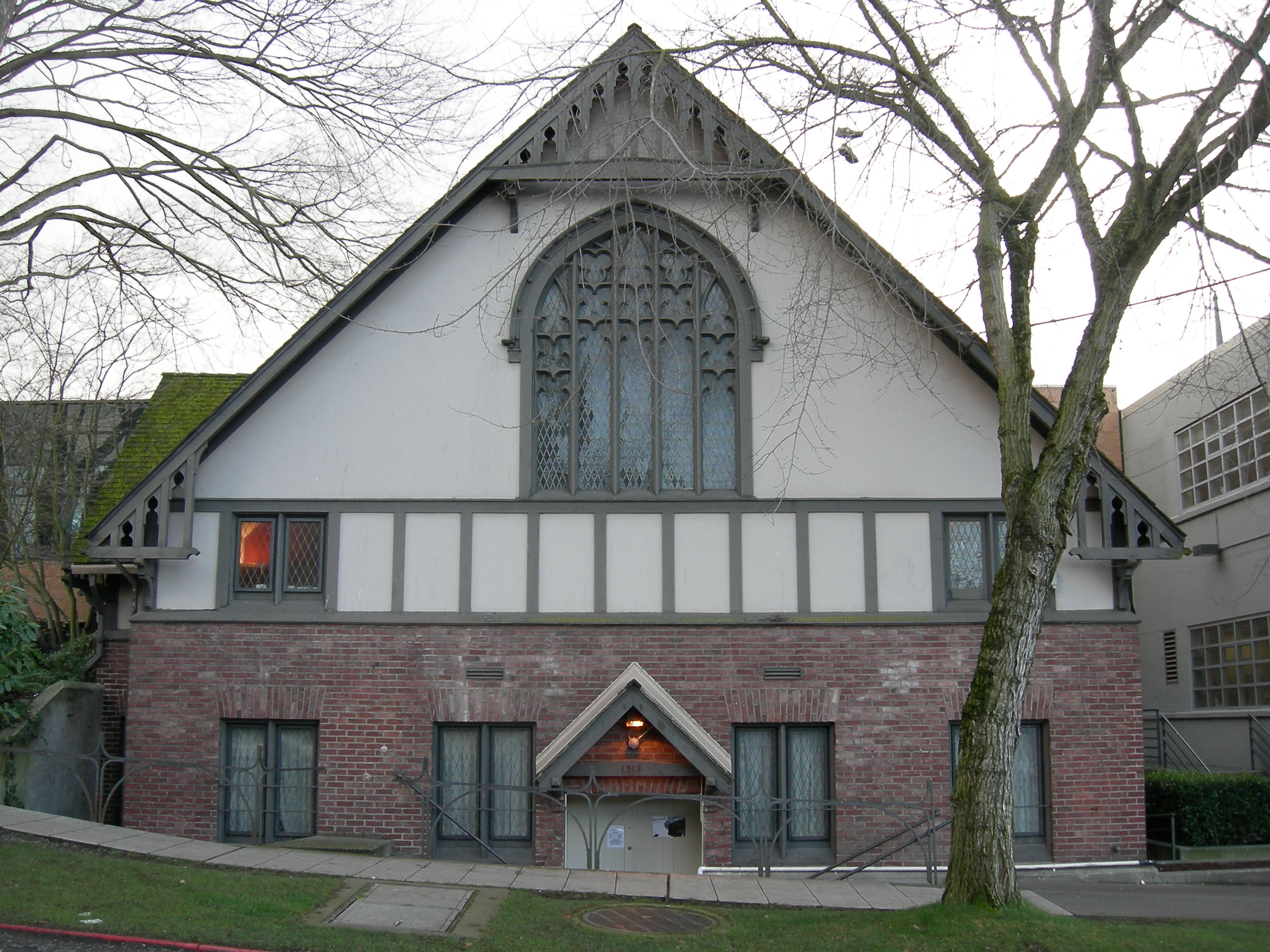
This building that now serves as the chapel of University Presbyterian Church was originally designed by Ellsworth Storey and was completed in 1916 as the first purpose-built home of University Unitarian Church.

University Presbyterian Church in Seattle, Washington, United States is a Presbyterian congregation with 2,434 members as of 2021. As of 2016, its senior pastor was George Hinman.

== History ==
The church was founded in 1908. The church had a large membership increase during the 1980s, when it was led by pastor Bruce Larson; Larson subsequently became co-pastor of the Crystal Cathedral in Garden Grove, California.

The current organ was completed in 1999. The Reuter Organ, Opus 2196, was built in Lawrence Kansas. The organ committee, their consultant, Joseph Adam, and organist JoAnn Stremler helped collaborate on the new organ's design with Reuter's regional representative, David R. Salmen. Senior Pastor Dr. Earl F. Palmer said of the organ: "In this house of worship we call University Presbyterian Church, that gift of great and tender sound is ours. Tears still well up in my eyes when I hear its subtlety and grandeur."

Earl Palmer was senior pastor for 15 years, following Bruce Larson and preceding George Hinman. Palmer retired to form Earl Palmer Ministries where he continued teaching, ministering, and mentoring until his death in 2023. Palmer's articles, videos, and sermons can be heard and downloaded from his web site, including episodes from the Kindlings Muse, Earl's lectures on C. S. Lewis, and hundreds of sermons reaching back to the 1970s.

In 2001, the average weekly attendance was 5,000 (marking it as a megachurch at the time).

== Current status ==
As of 2021, the weekly attendance is 800.

University Presbyterian Church provides ministries for "the mentally ill, homeless teens living on the streets, and those who are in prison." The congregation was a pioneer in the practice of sending short-term mission teams overseas.
