= Marianne Thompson =

American theologian

Marianne Meye Thompson is an American theologian, currently the George Eldon Ladd Professor of New Testament at Fuller Theological Seminary.

She was one of the translators for the Gospel of John for the New Living Translation Bible.

Dr. Thompson is an ordained minister of the Presbyterian Church (USA).

== Works ==
- Thompson, Marianne Meye. 1-3 John. Vol. 19. InterVarsity Press, 1992.
- Thompson, Marianne M. (2000). The Promise of the Father: Jesus and God in the New Testament. Louisville: Westminster John Knox Press. ISBN 9780664221973.
- Achtemeier, Paul J., Joel B. Green, and Marianne Meye Thompson. Introducing the New Testament: Its literature and theology. Wm. B. Eerdmans Publishing, 2001.
- Thompson, Marianne Meye. The God of the gospel of John. Wm. B. Eerdmans Publishing, 2001.
- Thompson, Marianne Meye. Colossians and Philemon. Vol. 12. Wm. B. Eerdmans Publishing, 2005.
- Thompson, Marianne Meye. "The Gospel of John and early Trinitarian thought: the unity of God in John, Irenaeus and Tertullian." Journal of Early Christian History 4, no. 2 (2014): 154-166.
- Thompson, Marianne Meye. John: A commentary. Westminster John Knox Press, 2015.
- Thompson, Marianne Meye. "Reflections on joy in the Bible." In Joy and human flourishing: Essays on theology, culture, and the good life, ed. by Miroslav Wolf (2015): 17-38. Fortress Press.
