= Bruce Vawter =

American Vincentian priest and biblical scholar

Francis Bruce Vawter, CM (1921 – 1 December 1986) was an American Vincentian priest and a biblical scholar.

== Biography ==
Vawter was born in 1921 at Fort Worth, and joined the Vincentians in 1942. He was ordained in 1947. Vawter received his doctorate in sacred Scripture from the Pontifical Biblical Institute in Rome, and then was a Fulbright scholar at Eberhard University in Tübingen, West Germany.

Vawter was chairman of De Paul University's department of religious studies from 1969 until June 1986.

Vawter was a witness in the 1981 Creationism trial, reported as McLean v. Arkansas, at Little Rock, Arkansas.

Vawter died on 1 December 1986.

== Works ==
Vawter authored more than a dozen works.

=== As author ===
- Job and Jonah
- The Path of Wisdom
- Amos, Hosea, Micah: With an Introduction to Classical Prophecy
- On Genesis
- This Man Jesus
- The four Gospels
- Biblical Inspiration

=== As editor ===
- Various works issued by the Catholic Biblical Association of America
- Old Testament Abstracts
