= University Presbyterian Church and Student Center =

Historic church in Wisconsin, United States

- U.S. National Register of Historic Places
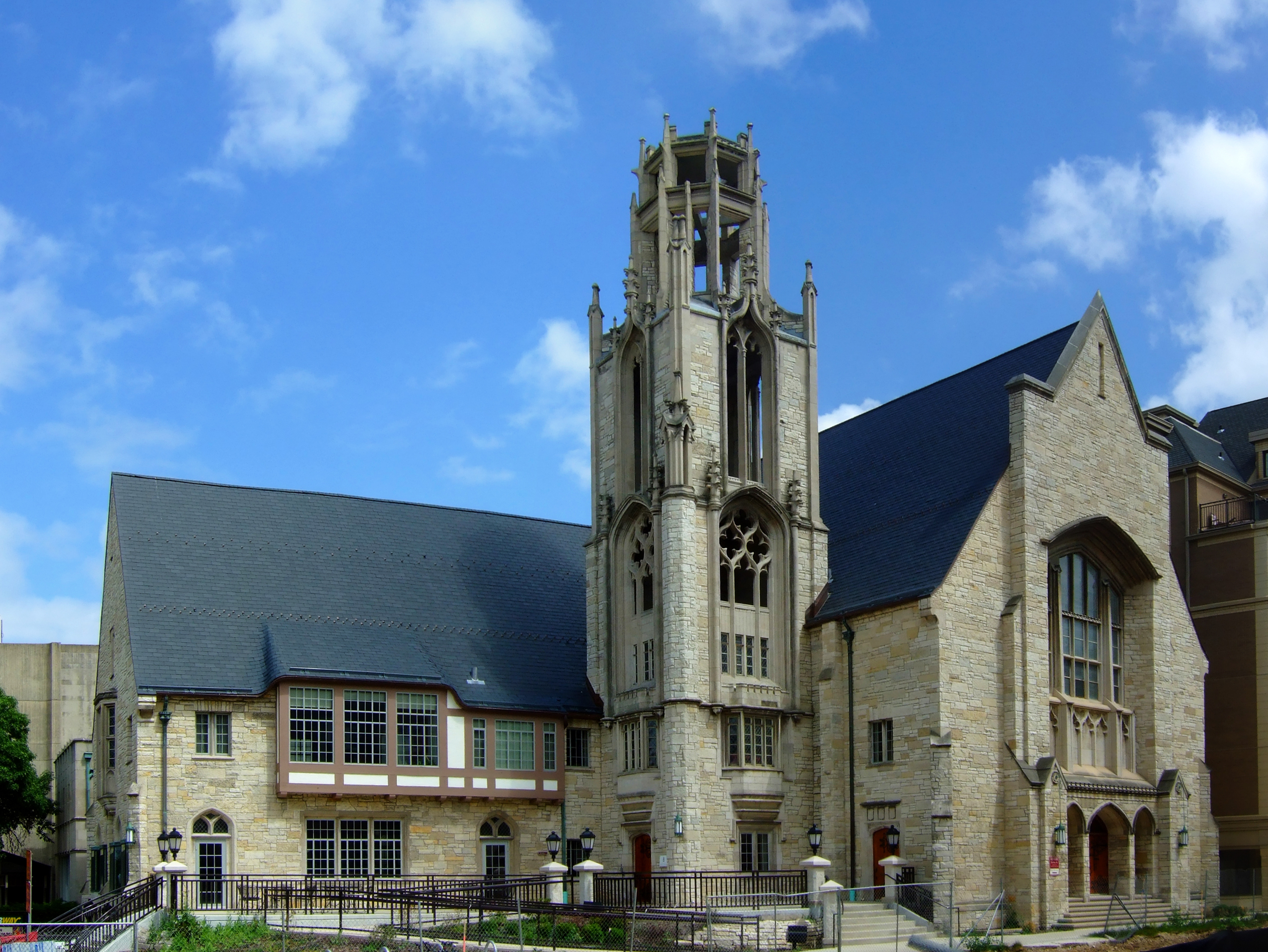
- University Presbyterian Church and Student Center

- Location within Wisconsin Location within the United States
- Location: 731 State St. Madison, Wisconsin
- Coordinates: 43°4′29″N 89°23′55″W
- Built: 1935
- Architectural style: Gothic Revival
- NRHP reference No.: 02001185
- Added to NRHP: October 16, 2002

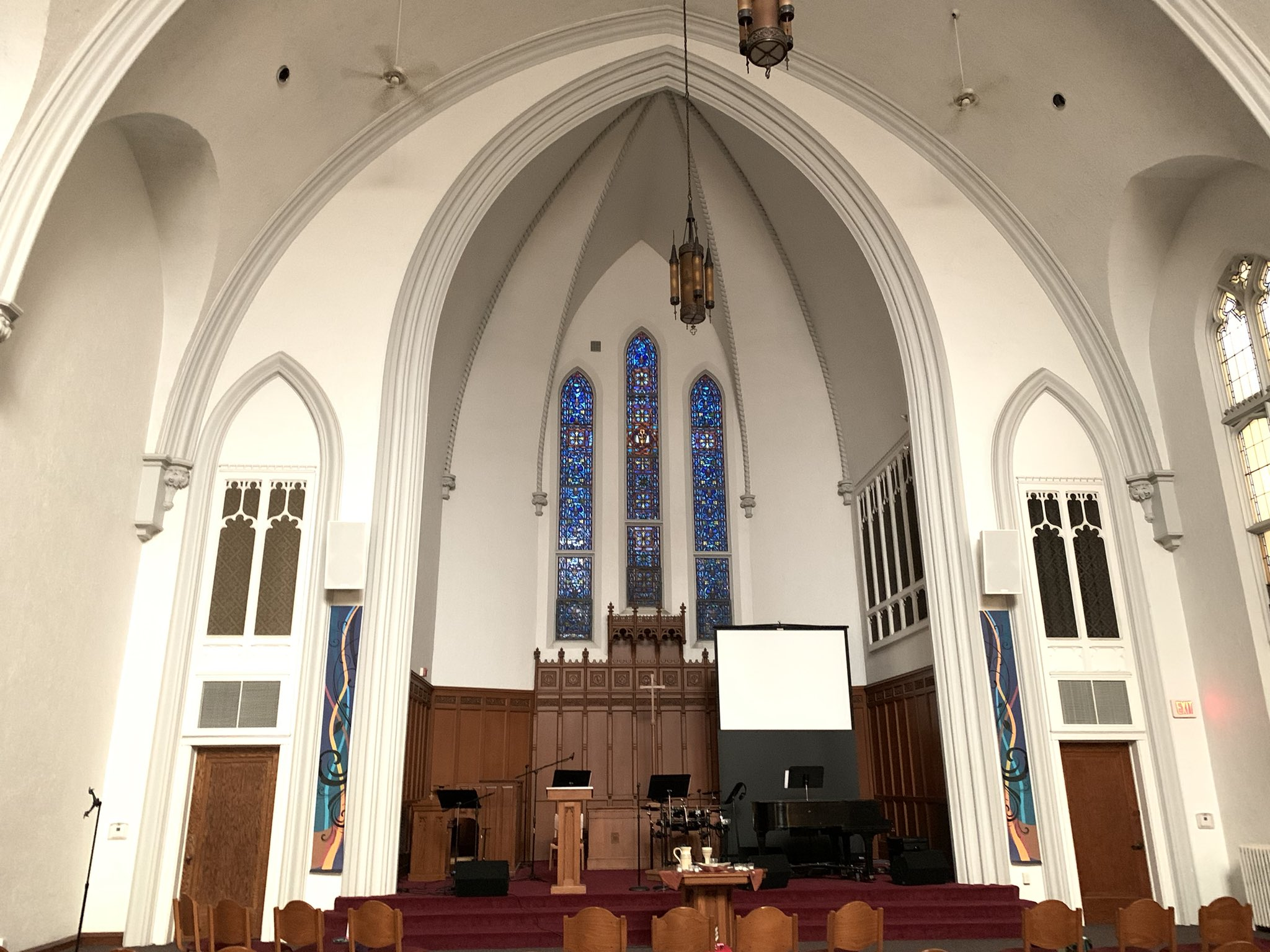
Interior of chapel

The University Presbyterian Church and Student Center, nicknamed Pres House, is a historic church on State Street in Madison, Wisconsin, United States. Designed in 1931 by local architect Edward Tough in a Gothic Revival style, and after a delay occasioned by the Great Depression it was completed four years later.

== History ==
In 1848, Wisconsin became a state, Madison was named its capital, and the University of Wisconsin–Madison was founded. In 1901, Rev. James Beveridge Lee of Milwaukee's Immanuel Presbyterian Church and Rev. Barton B. Bigler of Madison's Christ Church petitioned the state Synod to provide a minister for Presbyterian students at the university. The Synod responded by founding the Presbyterian Student Union. When Rev. George Hunt succeeded Bigler in 1904, he further petitioned the Synod to send a pastor to minister to the students. This was authorized the following year with the transfer of Rev. Matthew C. Allison from Indiana University in Bloomington.

The Student Union was originally located in Christ Church, 1 mile (1.6 km) away from campus. This distance discourage students from attending regular services. Allison and Hunt proposed a new building at a meeting of the Presbyterian Assembly. At a national conference in 1916, the Assembly approved a union building near campus. However, the American involvement in World War I stymied fundraising efforts. When the war ended Allison identified a property near campus and purchased it on February 11, 1920. Allison led a remodeling effort to transform the former Fitch House into a chapel and clubhouse, with a residence for Allison on the second floor. Three other houses on the property were rented out, raising money for the mission.

By the mid-1920s, the "Pres House" was too small to accommodate the growing student body. In 1929, Allison began a fundraising effort for a new clubhouse. Edward Tough was commissioned with its design, and J. H. Findorff & Son was hired as contractor. Construction began in August 1931 for a cost of $112,561. However, following the Wall Street crash of 1929, the church could not afford this cost. Parts of the building were left unfinished. Allison died, probably from complications of a stroke, on July 25, 1935. His funeral in the unfinished building reignited interest in its completion. Donations from a Mrs. Nishan and the Board of Trustees of Carroll College permitted the completion of the project.

The completed Pres House featured student lounges on each floor, several sleeping rooms on the second floor, and a basement with a stage and pastor's apartment. Pres House provided housing, employment, and inexpensive food to students during the Depression. In 1962, the church became part of the newly formed Universities and Colleges Christian Fellowship. By 1969, attendance had dropped so much that the congregation voted to dissolve. The next year, it merged with three other student ministries to form the Madison Campus Ministry.

Madison Campus Ministry (MCM) operated within Pres House until the late 1990s. During this time a student run coffee shop called the Catacombs was established and a wide variety of programming was provided. Numerous other student groups made their home in the building for office space and meeting space. In 1999 the Synod of Lakes and Prairies considered selling the property but local leaders and Madison area churches insisted the prime location and rich history was too valuable to part with. The Presbyterian Student Center Board of Directors sought to develop a new model for programming and funding that would take Pres House into the next phase of history. Pres House and MCM parted ways and moved into new phases of ministry separately.

In 2004 the Pres House Board hired new Co-Pastor Directors, Rev. Mark Elsdon and Rev. Erica Liu. Together with the board, alumni, donors, and community leaders they re-built the student church community and re-developed the parking lot behind Pres House. In 2007 the parking lot was turned into a $17 million, 7-story apartment building called the Pres House Apartments which is home to approximately 250 students. That same year the Pres House Chapel and Student Center underwent a major restoration and renovation.

The historic chapel building was recognized by the National Park Service with a listing on the National Register of Historic Places on October 16, 2002.
