= Only-begotten Son =

Ancient Christian hymn

Only-Begotten Son (Ancient Greek: Ὁ Μονογενὴς Υἱὸς, Russian: Единородный Сыне, Ukrainian: Єдинородний Сине, Old Armenian: Միածին Որդի), sometimes called "Justinian's Hymn", the "Anthem of Orthodoxy" and/or the "Hymn of the Incarnation", is an ancient Christian hymn that was composed prior to the middle of the 6th century. It is chanted at the end of the Second Antiphon during the Divine Liturgies of St John Chrysostom, St Basil the Great and of St Gregory the Illuminator (Armenian Divine Liturgy), and at the Little Entrance during the Liturgy of Saint James.

It is still currently used as a mournful hymn during the service of Great Friday in the Coptic Orthodox Church of Alexandria, with its length exceeding 10 minutes due to its long and deep melismatic nature. It is also chanted in the introductory portion of the Divine Liturgy of the Eastern Orthodox Church and those Eastern Catholic Churches which observe the Byzantine Rite. The hymn is a theological statement of faith in the dogma of the Incarnation.

== Attributions ==
There are traditions attributing the hymn to Emperor Justinian Severus of Antioch and Pope Athanasius I of Alexandria hence its common Greek designation as "Justinian's Hymn". It is popularly believed that Justinian is the person responsible for the hymn's spread and popularity. During the controversy caused by the Origenists, Emperor Justinian declared that this hymn should be sung in all Christian Churches.

The Oriental Orthodox tradition however, ascribes the hymn to Severus of Antioch, and it is referred to in Syriac Orthodox liturgical books as the “Hymn of St. Severus.” In the Syriac Orthodox liturgy, the hymn is sung at the start of the Divine Liturgy, whereas in the Armenian Orthodox liturgy, it is sung during the second antiphon and the text is identical to the Byzantine version, and in the Coptic Orthodox liturgy, during Holy Week.

Analysis of an ancient Georgian Chantbook from Jerusalem has identified the text among the corpus of hymnography, supporting a timeframe of composition prior to the middle of the 6th century when the Chantbook was compiled.

== Text ==
Only-Begotten Son and Immortal Word of God,
Who for our salvation didst will to be incarnate of the holy Theotokos and Ever-Virgin Mary;
Who without change didst become man and was crucified;
Who art one of the Holy Trinity, glorified with the Father and the Holy Spirit:
O Christ our God, trampling down death by death, save us!

== Theology ==
The key word, Monogenēs, is drawn from the Gospel of John 1:14, 1:18, and 3:16. The first of these verses describes the pre-incarnate Logos as being "only-begotten of the Father"; the second speaks of Jesus' earthly ministry; and the third describes the offering of the Incarnate Christ for the salvation of those who believe. The term Monogenes is also found in the Nicene Creed as established by the First Ecumenical Council in 325 AD.
