= 3sixteen =

American clothing brand

- Company type: Private
- Industry: Clothing
- Founded: 2003; 23 years ago in New York City, USA
- Products: Denim clothing
- Owners: Andrew Chen, Johan Lam
- Website: 3sixteen.com

3sixteen is a New York City based clothing brand founded in 2003 which focuses on Made in USA denim. Its flagship store is located in Nolita. 3sixteen's owners are Andrew Chen and Johan Lam.

== Collaborations ==
At its beginning, 3sixteen worked directly with Kuroki Mills in Okayama, Japan to develop a custom 14.5oz selvedge denim, and has continued to source custom woven denim from the mill in the years since.

3sixteen has engaged in many partnerships throughout its history. 3sixteen collaborated with Blackstock & Weber on a rubber crepe sole loafer. In 2024, 3sixteen collaborated with Schott on a bomber jacket. In 2024 3sixteen and Crocs co-created a clog.
