= Merrill C. Tenney =

American academic

Merrill Chapin Tenney
- Born: April 16, 1904; Chelsea, Massachusetts
- Died: March 18, 1985 (aged 80); Wheaton, Illinois
- Occupations: American professor of New Testament and Greek
- Known for: Editor of the Zondervan Pictorial Bible Dictionary
- Board member of: Evangelical Theological Society

Academic background
- Education: Harvard University
- Thesis: (1944)

Merrill Chapin Tenney (April 16, 1904 – March 18, 1985) was an American professor of New Testament and Greek and author of several books. He was the general editor of the Zondervan Pictorial Bible Dictionary, and served on the original translation team for the New American Standard Bible.

== Background and education ==
Tenney was born April 16, 1904, in Chelsea, Massachusetts, to Wallace Fay Tenney and Lydia Smith Goodwin. He earned a diploma from Nyack Missionary Training Institute (1924), his Th.B. from Gordon College of Theology and Missions (1927), his A.M. from Boston University (1930), and his Ph.D. in Biblical and Patristic Greek from Harvard University (1944). He married Helen Margaret Jaderquist (1904–1978) in 1930, and together they had three sons, John Merrill (who died in childhood), Robert Wallace and Philip Chapin.

== Academic career ==
Tenney briefly served as pastor of Storrs Avenue Baptist Church in Braintree, Massachusetts (1926–1928), and began teaching at Gordon College while still a student there. After graduation, he joined the faculty and was professor of New Testament and Greek until moving to Wheaton College in 1944, where he would eventually become dean of the graduate school from 1947 to 1971. Tenney was Henry Clarence Thiessen's chosen associate and (accordingly) an advocate of fundamentalism. He retired in 1977, but continued teaching as professor emeritus until 1982.

== Legacy and death ==
In 1951, Tenney became the second president of the Evangelical Theological Society. In 1975, a volume of essays entitled Current Issues in Biblical and Patristic Interpretation (ISBN 0802834426) was published in his honor. Tenney died in Wheaton on March 18, 1985.

== Selected works ==
=== Books ===
- Tenney, Merrill C. (1948). John: The Gospel of Belief: an analytic study of the text. Grand Rapids, MI: Eerdmans. OCLC 854160341.
- ——— (1956). Philippians: The Gospel at Work. Grand Rapids, MI: Eerdmans.
- ——— (1957). Galatians: The Charter of Christian Liberty. Grand Rapids, MI: Eerdmans. ISBN 9780802832535. OCLC 2174410.
- ——— (1957). Interpreting Revelation. Grand Rapids, MI: Eerdmans. ISBN 9780802832542. OCLC 13074699.
- ——— (1961). New Testament Survey. Grand Rapids, MI: Eerdmans. OCLC 10534288.
- ——— (1967). New Testament Times. Grand Rapids, MI: Eerdmans. ISBN 9780802804181. OCLC 1473505.
- ——— (1979). Roads a Christian Must Travel: fresh insights into the principles of Christian experience. Tyndale House Publishers. ISBN 9780842356756.
- ——— (1980). 12 Questions Jesus Asked. Victor Books. ISBN 9780882073460.

=== As editor ===
- ———, ed. (1963). Zondervan's Pictorial Bible Dictionary. Grand Rapids, MI: Zondervan. ISBN 9780310235606. OCLC 2517623.

=== Articles and chapters ===
- ——— (1960). "The Footnotes of John's Gospel". Bibliotheca Sacra. 117 (468): 350–64.
- ——— (January 1975). "Topics from the Gospel of John: Part I: The Person of the Father". Bibliotheca Sacra. 132: 37–46.
- ——— (April 1975). "Topics from the Gospel of John: Part II: The Meaning of the Signs". Bibliotheca Sacra. 132: 145–60.
- ——— (July 1975). "Topics from the Gospel of John: Part III: The Meaning of "Witness" in John". Bibliotheca Sacra. 132: 229–41.
- ——— (1963). "I. Literary Keys to the Fourth Gospel: The Symphonic Structure of John". Bibliotheca Sacra. 120: 117–25.
- ——— (July 1963). "II. Literary Keys to the Fourth Gospel: The Authori's Testimony to Himself". Bibliotheca Sacra. 120: 214–23.
- ——— (October 1963). "III. Literary Keys to the Fourth Gospel: The Old Testament and the Fourth Gospel". Bibliotheca Sacra. 120: 300–08.
- ——— (January 1964). "IV. Literary Keys to the Fourth Gospel: The Imagery of John". Bibliotheca Sacra. 121: 13–21.
