= Westminster John Knox Press =

Christian books publisher

- Parent company: Presbyterian Publishing Corporation
- Country of origin: United States
- Headquarters location: Louisville, Kentucky
- Distribution: Self-distributed, fulfillment by Ingram (US); Norwich Books and Music (UK); Parasource Marketing & Distribution (Canada); St. Paul's India (India); Africa Christian Textbooks (Nigeria); SKS Books Warehouse (Singapore); Christian Book Discounters, Methodist Publishing House (South Africa); John Garratt Publishing, MediaCom Education (Australia)
- Publication types: Books
- Official website: www.wjkbooks.com

Westminster John Knox Press is an American publisher of Christian books located in Louisville, Kentucky and is part of Presbyterian Publishing Corporation, the publishing arm of the Louisville, Kentucky-based Presbyterian Church (U.S.A.). Their publishing focus is on books in "theology, biblical studies, preaching, worship, ethics, religion and culture, and other related fields for four main markets: scholars and students in colleges, universities, seminaries, and divinity schools; preachers, educators, and counselors working in churches; members of mainline Protestant congregations; and general readers. Geneva Press publishes books specifically related to the Presbyterian Church (U.S.A.)."

== History ==
Westminster John Knox Press is the result of a merger in 1988 of the publishing companies Westminster Press and John Knox Press. It publishes scholarly works in religion and theology for the academic community, for congregations, and resources for teaching and ruling elders. It also publishes "nationally recognized trade books for general readers, and essential resources for ministry and the life of faith". It currently has over 1,600 books in print, and has been publishing books and other materials since 1838. In 2001, it had to reduce staff by 20%.
