= RANCH Triangle =

Neighborhood of Chicago

Coordinates: 41°54′53″N 87°39′11″W

RANCH Triangle is a small neighborhood within Lincoln Park, Chicago. The word is an acronym composed of the boundaries of the neighborhood: Racine (Avenue), Armitage (Avenue), North (Avenue), Chicago (River), and Halsted (Street). The neighborhood is largely residential, and known for its historic brownstones, parks, and theaters such as The Steppenwolf. The nonprofit community organization RANCH Triangle Community Conservation Association was founded in 1963 to promote the interests of neighborhood residents.

== Economy ==
The retail corridor around Armitage station has brick-and-mortar stores for brands including Abercrombie & Fitch, Aēsop (cosmetics), Buck Mason (clothing), Benefit Cosmetics, Bonobos (apparel), Budlong Hot Chicken, La Colombe Coffee, Faherty Brand, Huckberry, Jeni's Ice Cream, Jenni Kayne (clothing), Kiehl's (skin and body care), Lush (cosmetics), Marine Layer, Moscot, Outdoor Voices (athletic apparel), Rails, Rhone (yoga pants), Rothy's (shoes), State & Liberty Clothing, Todd Snyder (menswear), Topdrawer (stationery), and Warby Parker (eyeglasses and contact lenses).
