= 488 Madison Avenue =

Office skyscraper in Manhattan, New York

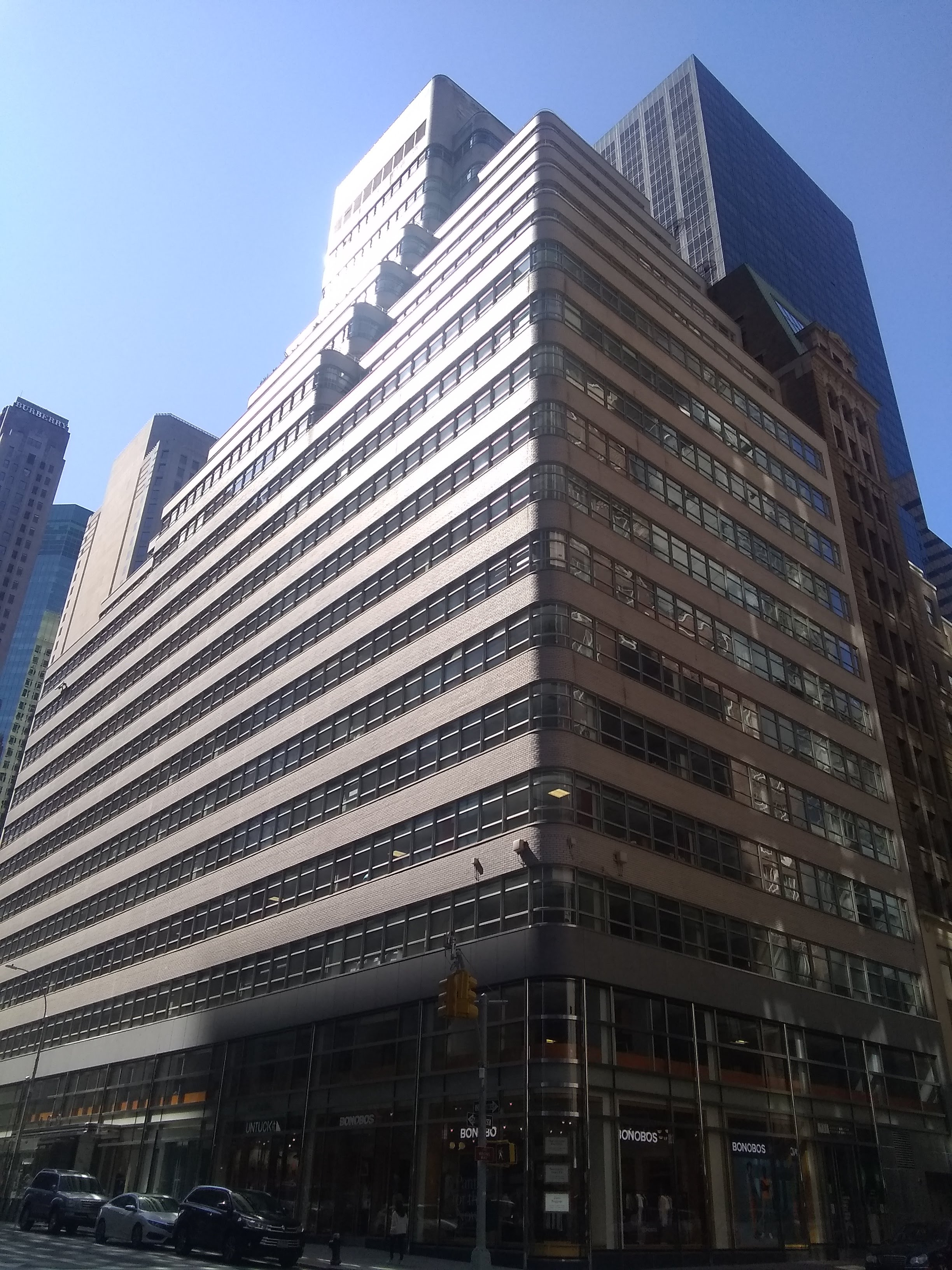
- Interactive map of the 488 Madison Avenue area
- Alternative names: Look Building

General information
- Type: Office
- Architectural style: International Style
- Location: Manhattan, New York, U.S.
- Coordinates: 40°45′32″N 73°58′31″W
- Named for: Look magazine
- Construction started: November 1948
- Topped-out: August 1949
- Opened: Early 1950
- Owner: The Feil Organization

Height
- Height: 304 ft (93 m)

Technical details
- Floor count: 25

Design and construction
- Architecture firm: Emery Roth & Sons
- Main contractor: Uris Brothers
- Look Building
- U.S. National Register of Historic Places
- New York State Register of Historic Places
- New York City Landmark
- Location: 488 Madison Ave., New York, New York
- Coordinates: 40°45′32″N 73°58′31″W
- Area: less than one acre
- Built: 1950
- Architect: Emery Roth & Sons
- Architectural style: International Style
- NRHP reference No.: 05000087
- NYSRHP No.: 06101.015024
- NYCL No.: 2376

Significant dates
- Added to NRHP: February 24, 2005
- Designated NYSRHP: December 18, 2004
- Designated NYCL: July 27, 2010

488 Madison Avenue, also known as the Look Building, is a 25-story office building in the Midtown Manhattan neighborhood of New York City. It is along Madison Avenue's western sidewalk between 51st and 52nd Streets, near St. Patrick's Cathedral. 488 Madison Avenue was designed by Emery Roth & Sons in the International Style, and it was constructed and developed by Uris Brothers. The building was originally named for its primary tenant, the American magazine Look.

The building largely contains a facade of white brick, interspersed with horizontal strips of aluminum windows. The lowest two stories contain a main entrance on Madison Avenue as well as several glass-and-metal storefronts. The three sides are connected by curved walls. The exterior includes several setbacks to comply with the 1916 Zoning Resolution. Each of the building's stories contain an average floor area of 19,500 square feet (1,810 m^{2}), a feature intended to maximize usable office space.

488 Madison Avenue was constructed from 1948 to 1950 as a speculative real estate development, without a main tenant. By late 1949, the building was completely leased, and it was named after Look magazine, which had signed a lease for several floors. 488 Madison Avenue remained the headquarters of Look until the magazine stopped publishing in 1971, although it continued to be known as the Look Building for several years. The building has been owned by John D. and Catherine T. MacArthur Foundation and The Feil Organization since the 1970s. The Look Building was added to the National Register of Historic Places in 2005, and the New York City Landmarks Preservation Commission designated it as an official landmark in 2010.

== Site ==
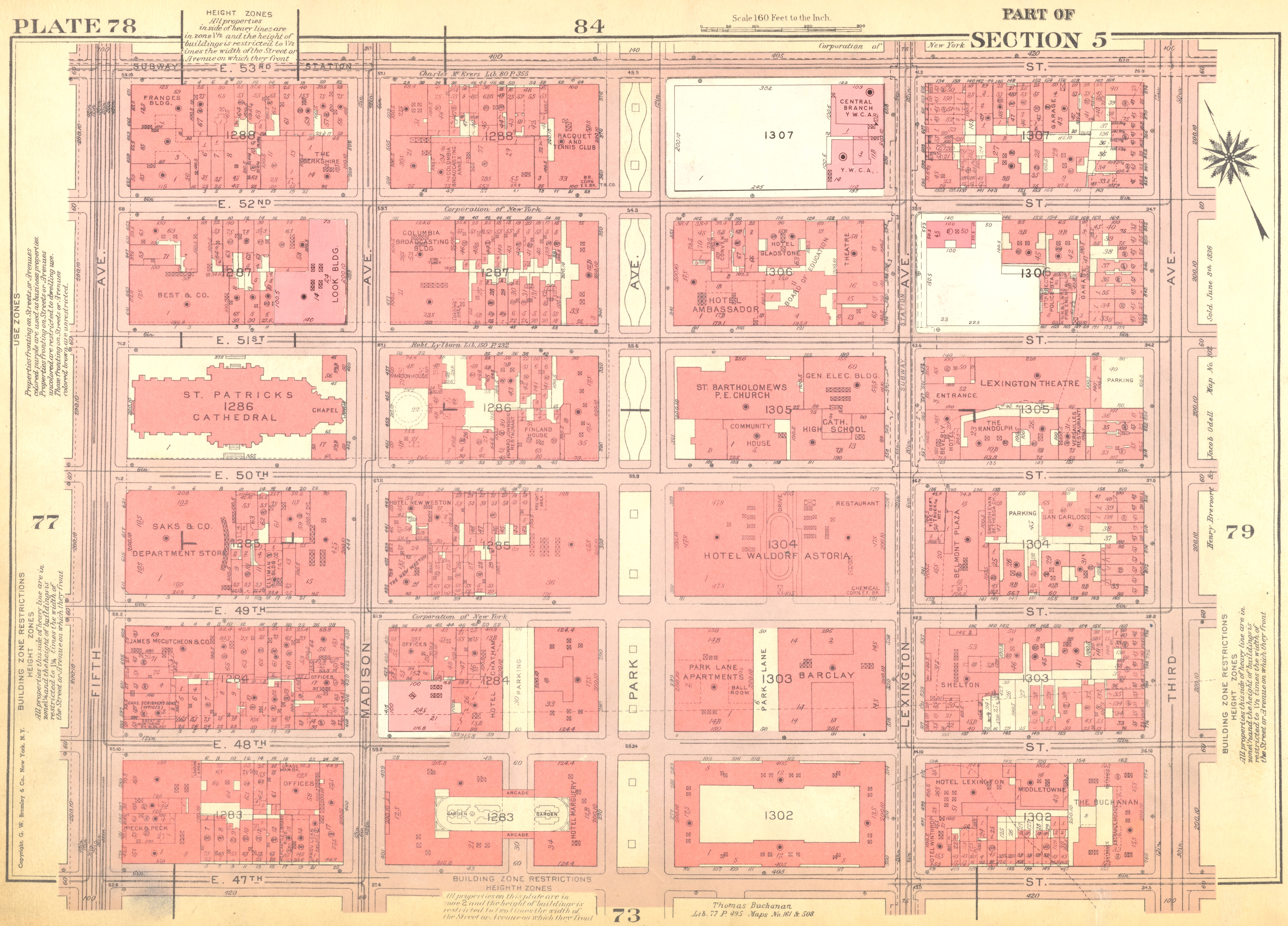
Map of the site in 1955/1956

488 Madison Avenue is in the Midtown Manhattan neighborhood of New York City. The L-shaped land lot is bounded by Madison Avenue to the east, 52nd Street to the north, and 51st Street to the south. The land lot covers approximately 21,600 square feet (2,010 m^{2}), with a frontage of 75 feet (23 m) on 52nd Street, 200 feet (61 m) on Madison Avenue, and 140 feet (43 m) on 51st Street. The Olympic Tower, Cartier Building, and 647 Fifth Avenue are on the same block to the west, and 11 East 51st Street abuts 488 Madison Avenue along 51st Street. Other nearby buildings include St. Patrick's Cathedral to the south, Villard Houses and the Lotte New York Palace Hotel to the southeast, the CBS Studio Building to the northeast, and Omni Berkshire Place and 12 East 53rd Street to the north.

In the 19th century, the site of 488 Madison Avenue was owned by the Roman Catholic Archdiocese of New York, which used the site for the Roman Catholic Asylum. The Archdiocese of New York built a boys' trade school on the site in 1893. The school was housed in a four-story red brick building with turrets, as well as a main entrance with three doors. The asylum sold off much of its land in 1902, and the trade school building became the Cathedral College, which opened the following year. The college moved from the site in 1942. The surrounding stretch of Madison Avenue was largely residential until World War II, when commercial structures were constructed on the avenue.

== Architecture ==
488 Madison Avenue, originally the Look Building, was designed by Emery Roth & Sons in the International Style and constructed by Uris Brothers between 1948 and 1950. The two firms were extremely closely associated and collaborated on many projects in the mid-20th century, and Emery Roth & Sons were particularly responsible for designing many of the modernist structures on Madison Avenue after World War II. The contractors included steel supplier Harris Structural Steel Corporation and electrical engineer Henry Oehrig. Some elements of the design date from 1997, when Hardy Holzman Pfeiffer Associates renovated the exterior.

Architectural writer Robert A. M. Stern called the building among Emery Roth & Sons' "best postwar work". Stern wrote that the building was influential in International Style Modernism because of its horizontal strip windows. According to Stern, the Look Building was the first major design to be constructed by Emery Roth & Sons after its namesake, founder Emery Roth, had died.

=== Facade ===
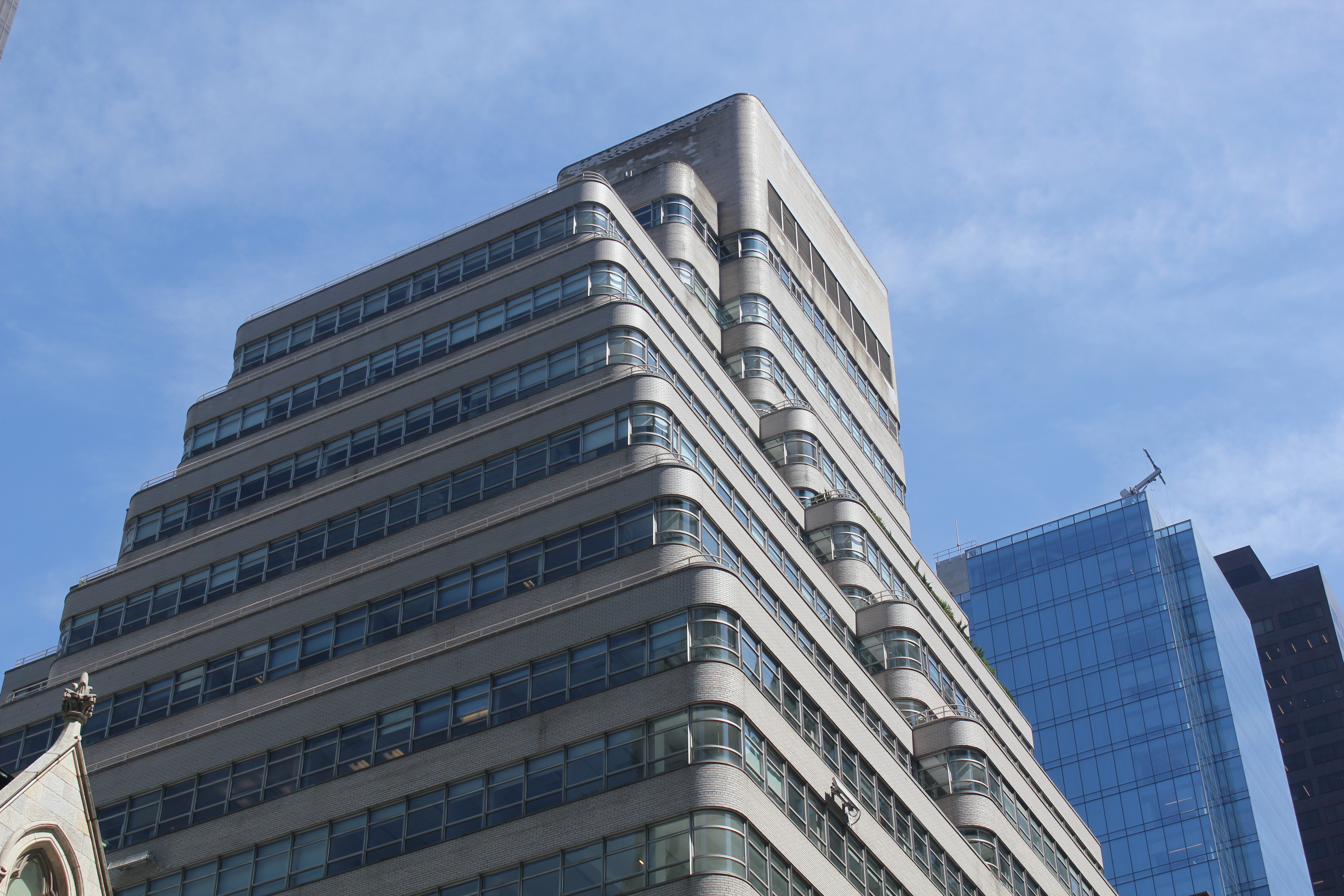
Setback detail

488 Madison Avenue contains 23 stories, with two additional mechanical stories at the top. The building's facade contains setbacks to comply with the 1916 Zoning Resolution. On the southern facade, there are setbacks at the eighth and 11th floors. There are additional setbacks on all three sides at the 13th, 15th, 17th, 19th, 21st, and 23rd stories. 488 Madison Avenue measures 308 feet (94 m) tall from ground level to roof.

The design of the base dates to a renovation in the late 1980s. The base is two stories tall and consists of a wall of glass panels, some of which are tinted black. The main entrance is on Madison Avenue, at the center of that side, which slopes down toward 52nd Street. The main entrance contains a revolving door between two swinging glass doors. These doors are recessed inside a passage paved with granite in light and dark gray shades. Above the entrance is a marquee sign with the number "488". A row of cast stone panels runs above the base on all sides. On either side of the main entrance, and on 51st and 52nd Streets, are aluminum storefronts.

The remainder of the facade is mostly made of white brick with aluminum windows wrapping in a continuous ribbon around each floor. The windows are arranged into three horizontal rows of panes and do not contain any columns behind them. The design was intended to place an emphasis on the horizontal axis, as well as give a "light and cheerful" effect to the occupants by having continuous windows. According to Percy Uris of Uris Brothers, "if a building has good lines, its simplicity will add to its beauty". Curves at the building's corners connect each facade. The curved corners contain a radius of 3.5 feet (1.1 m). Marv Rothenstein, an employee of Uris Brothers, stated that curved motifs were used frequently in the design.

=== Features ===
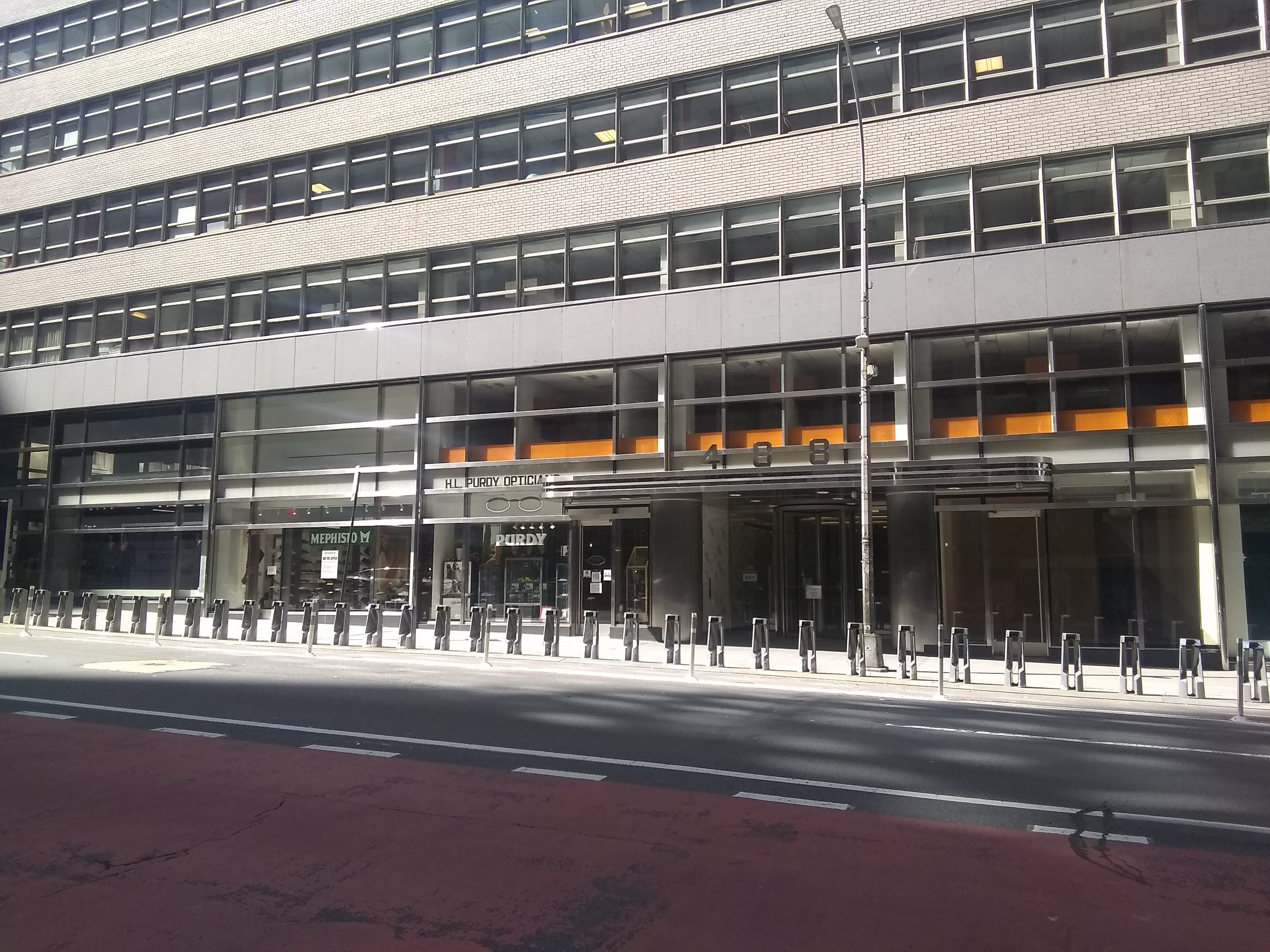
Main entrance

The average office floor is designed with 19,500 square feet (1,810 m^{2}) of office space, more than ninety percent of the lot area. Richard Roth of Emery Roth and Sons believed that, in general, there were relatively few "good tenants" who were willing to occupy smaller floor areas. Accordingly, he sought to maximize usable office space in the company's buildings. Harold Uris of Uris Brothers believed similarly, saying, "We had a policy of creating the greatest amount of space for the lowest cost."

The materials in the lobby have been replaced, but its layout remains largely unchanged from the building's opening. The lobby floor is clad in white and black granite, and the walls are clad in limestone and contain terrazzo decorative elements. The original coved ceiling was replaced with a lower ceiling of a similar style. There are stainless steel doors on the elevators, which date from the original design. Percy Uris sought to arrange the elevators so no patron would have to wait more than 35 seconds for a cab, and he also aimed to reduce pedestrian traffic congestion in the lobby.

== History ==
=== Development ===
The old Cathedral College at Madison Avenue, between 51st and 52nd Streets, was sold in October 1948 to the Uris Brothers for $2.6 million. The following month, plans for 488 Madison Avenue were filed with the New York City Department of Buildings. At the time, there was high demand for office space in Midtown Manhattan; the new structure was one of eight ongoing projects in Manhattan that added a collective 3.628 million square feet (337,100 m^{2}) of office space. Uris Brothers publicly announced plans for 488 Madison Avenue in February 1949 as Cathedral College was being demolished. When the building was announced, Architectural Forum said of the design, "Advocates of the strip window can chalk up another recruit to their ranks". By that April, before construction had begun, tenants had already leased nine stories.

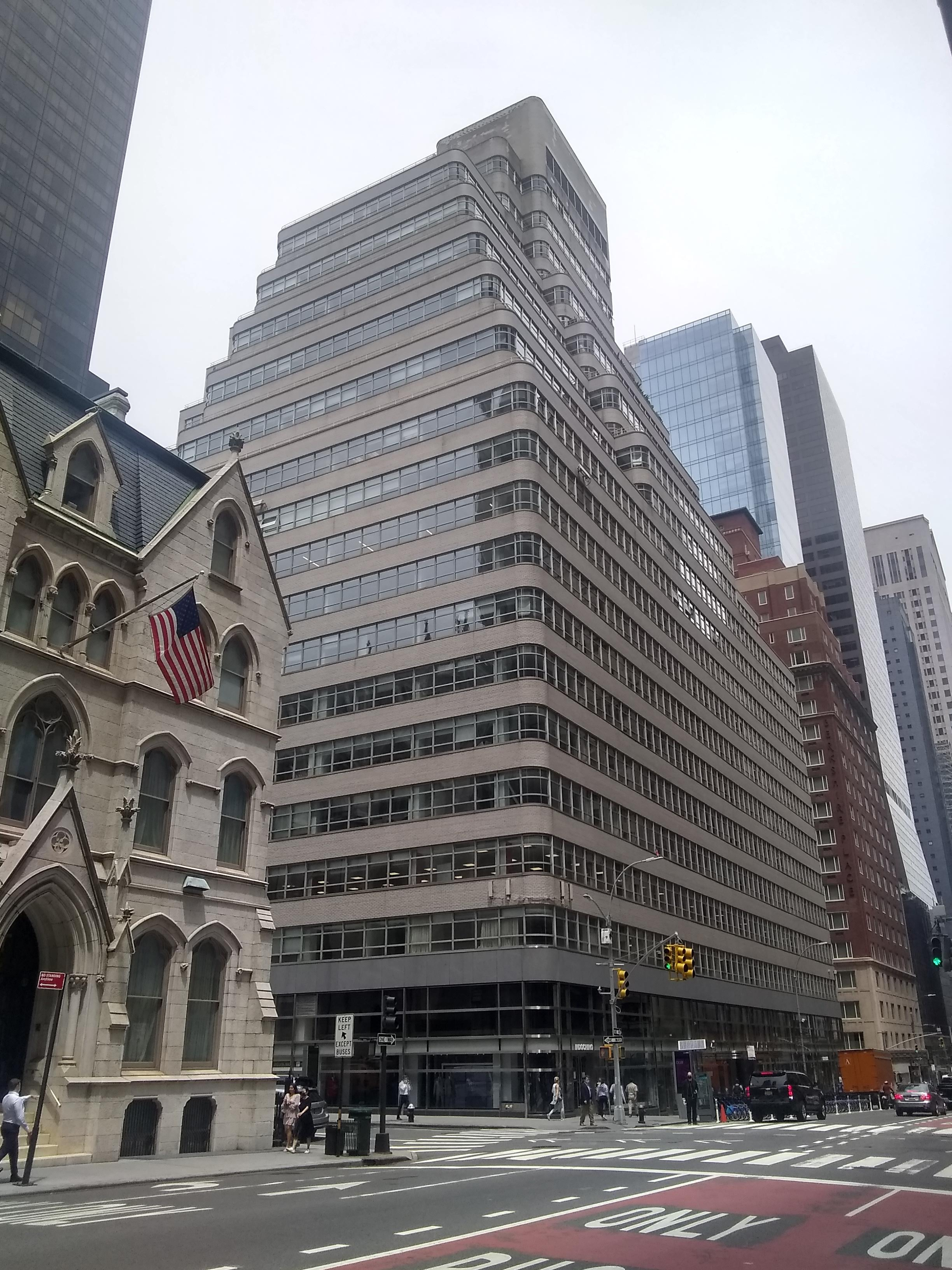
View of the building's southeastern corner from across Madison Avenue. The St. Patrick's Cathedral parish house is at left.

The first steel arrived at the site on June 1, 1949. The construction of the steelwork was difficult because the facade's corners were curved, which required specially made steel parts. According to The New York Times, the contractor hired three crews of seven riveters to construct the frame. However, Marv Rothenstein stated that the work was completed by seven teams of four riveters each. In any case, by August 7, the steel had been constructed to the nineteenth floor. The steel frame was topped out at the end of that month, exactly twelve weeks after steel construction. The New York Times called it "a post-war record for steel erection". Afterward, the facade was erected at a rate of four windows a week. By November 1949, all of the office space had been rented for long periods. The first tenants moved to the building in early 1950, and Uris Brothers took a mortgage loan of $7.5 million from the Prudential Life Insurance Company in May 1950.

=== Early tenants ===
Among the largest tenants was Cowles Magazines, the parent company of Look magazine, which initially took the 10th through 12th floors. The magazine, founded in 1937, was rapidly expanding at the time, with a circulation of three million in 1948. The building housed several other tenants in the publishing industry, including Seventeen magazine and Pocket Books. The building was subsequently named after Look magazine in early 1950, even though it had been planned as a speculative development. Esquire magazine, which took the third and fourth floors, sought to prevent the building from being named after Look in June 1950. Esquire argued the building's renaming would make it appear as though Esquire's publications were associated with Look. The lawsuit did not result in any significant action, as 488 Madison retained the "Look Building" name for decades.

The other early tenants included the Schrafft's chain of restaurants, which took up parts of the basement and first floor, as well as a florist, tailor, women's accessories, and fabric sales agency. The airline Linee Aeree Italiane took an office on the ground floor, and the New York Trust Company leased a bank branch on the first floor and basement. On the upper stories, a pair of life-insurance associations took the seventh through ninth floor, the Chemical Construction Company on the 15th and 16th floors, and the Katz Advertising Agency on the 20th floor. Emery Roth & Sons leased some space in their own design, as did Raymond Loewy, who devised designs for the Scenicruiser bus model for Greyhound Lines at the building. The Music Publishers Holding Company, a parent company of labels such as Harms, Inc., New World Music, Remick Music, and Witmark & Sons, also had space in the building. One visitor to the company's fifth-floor music studio was Bob Dylan, who created some demo tracks in the early 1960s.

=== Later use ===
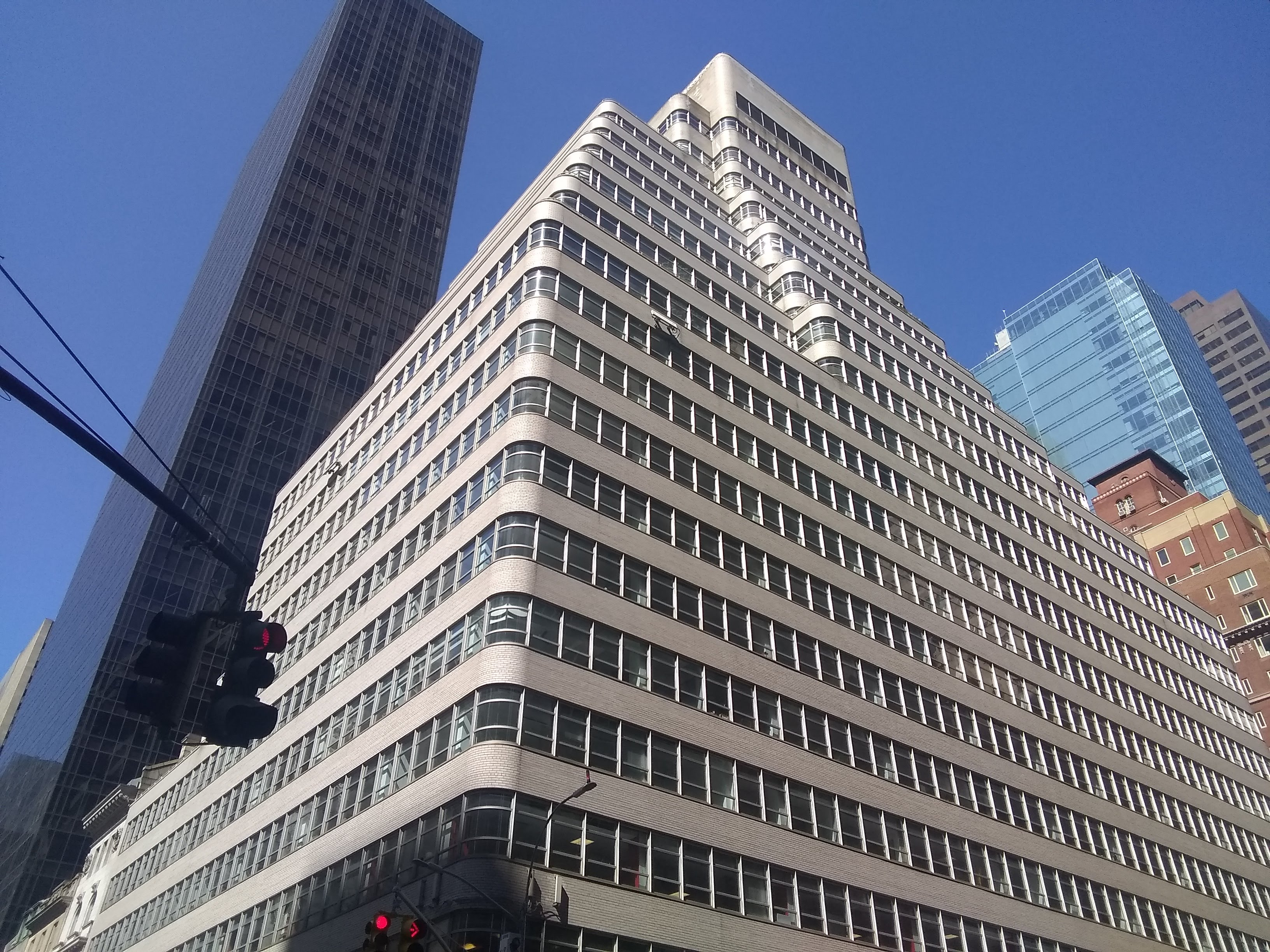
Seen from 51st Street, with the Olympic Tower at left

The Look Building was purchased by the Metropolitan Life Insurance Company in April 1953 and leased back to Uris that August. In 1963, Cowles Magazines expanded its space in the building by 78,000 square feet (7,200 m^{2}). Prior to the expansion, Cowles was already 488 Madison Avenue's largest tenant, with 125,000 square feet (11,600 m^{2}). At one point, the company had six stories in the building. Look magazine ultimately went defunct in October 1971. The leasehold for the building, excluding the land, was conveyed by Charles Benenson to John D. MacArthur in November 1973, although ownership of the land was not affected. Around that time, ownership passed to a joint venture between John D. and Catherine T. MacArthur Foundation and The Feil Organization. By the late 20th century, the Institutional Investor magazine and Abbeville Press had also become tenants of 488 Madison Avenue.

Despite Look magazine's closure, 488 Madison Avenue continued to be referred to as the Look Building. The south side of the penthouse contained letters that spelled "Look Building" until at least 1980. Horowitz Immerman Architects renovated the base in the late 1980s, replacing the original facade with a more modern design of steel and black glass. During the mid-1990s, Feil hired Hardy Holzman Pfeiffer Associates to renovate the building. The owners decided to restore the facade instead of rebuilding it because a facade restoration was cheaper, rather than because of aesthetic considerations. During this restoration, the steel windows were replaced with aluminum-framed panes, the brick was cleaned and partially replaced, and the slate windowsills were replaced. In addition, Fox & Fowle renovated the interior. Following the end of the restoration, in late 1998, the Municipal Art Society hosted an exhibit on the building's restoration.

The building was listed on the National Register of Historic Places on February 24, 2005, and the New York City Landmarks Preservation Commission designated the building as a city landmark on July 27, 2010. The Feil Organization announced a renovation of the lobby in 2012 to designs by Goldstein, Hill & West Architects. The work was completed early the following year. By the mid-2010s, the building's tenants included law firms and advertising agencies. In addition, the Feil Organization leased space to some online menswear shops in 2018. The building's tenants in the early 2020s included clothing stores Bonobos, Indochino, and Untuckit, as well as the Municipal Art Society and Shawmut Design and Construction. The Roman Catholic Archdiocese of New York is scheduled to relocate its main offices into the building in 2025.

== See also ==
- List of New York City Designated Landmarks in Manhattan from 14th to 59th Streets
- National Register of Historic Places listings in Manhattan from 14th to 59th Streets
