= New York City arts organizations =

The City of New York is home to many arts organizations. They include:

- A.I.R. Gallery
- African Diaspora International Film Festival
- African Film Festival, Inc.
- Alvin Ailey American Dance Theater
- American Dance Festival
- Apexart
- Artists Space
- Bang on a Can
- bitforms gallery
- Bloomberg Philanthropies
- BRIC Arts Media
- Bronx Council on the Arts
- Brooklyn Academy of Music
- Brooklyn Arts Council
- Brooklyn Historic Railway Association
- chashama
- CITYarts, Inc.
- City Parks Foundation
- Creative Capital
- Creative Time
- Drawing Center
- Ensemble Studio Theatre
- Harbor Conservatory for the Performing Arts
- International Studio & Curatorial Program
- The Kitchen (art institution)
- La MaMa Experimental Theatre Club
- Lincoln Center for the Performing Arts
- Lower East Side Printshop
- Martha Graham Dance Company
- Montez Press Radio
- Municipal Art Society
- Museum of Contemporary African Diasporan Arts
- National Academy of Design
- New Art Dealers Alliance
- New York Foundation for the Arts
- New York Live Arts
- New York Theatre Workshop
- No Longer Empty
- Pageant
- Performance Space New York
- Poetry Project
- Pioneer Works
- Playwrights Horizons
- Public Art Fund
- Rondo Young Artist Festival
- Roundabout Theatre Company
- Smack Mellon
- Society of American Artists
- The Public Theater
- UrbanGlass
- Volunteer Lawyers for the Arts
- Westbeth Artists Community
- White Columns
- The Wooster Group
- 92nd Street Y
