= Waterfront Alliance =

- Formation: 2007
- Type: Environmental & Urban Planning Organization
- Legal status: Non-profit organization
- Headquarters: New York, New York
- Region served: NY/NJ Waterfront Region
- Co-founder: Carter Craft
- Website: waterfrontalliance.org

The Waterfront Alliance or Metropolitan Waterfront Alliance (MWA) is a nonprofit organization that works to influence the development and use of the waterfront, shoreline, and connected upland areas of the Port of New York and New Jersey and the New York–New Jersey Harbor Estuary. It was created as a project by the Municipal Art Society in 1999 and in 2007 it became an independent nonprofit organization.

== Notable work ==
The Waterfront Alliance has been involved in several notable projects since its independence in 2007.

- Efforts to improve ferry service and establish an industrial heritage trail along the East River were initiated by Craft.
- In June 2007 the Waterfront Alliance and the Municipal Art Society released the documentary, City of Water, about the future of New York City waterfront.
- In 2008, it worked towards improving the permitting process for waterfront projects in the NY-NJ Harbor by creating a Waterfront Permitting Made Simple website.
- During 2009, the Waterfront Alliance worked to pass legislation to reinstate the Waterfront Management Advisory Board.
- In 2009 and 2010, the Waterfront Alliance worked with the City of New York to develop and execute a public input process for the update of the Comprehensive Waterfront Plan. The plan was released by the Department of City Planning in 2011 as part of the Vision 2020: New York City Comprehensive Waterfront Plan.
- The Waterfront Alliance began the Open Waters Initiative in 2010 as a program to construct community docks at waterfront sites in New York City. The first dock will be constructed in Bay Ridge, Brooklyn in 2012.

== Leadership ==
- The Waterfront Alliance was founded by the Municipal Art Society in 1999, and was led by urban planner and activist Carter Craft.
- Roland Lewis, an American urbanist, community organizer, and former executive director of Habitat for Humanity-New York City, was the president and CEO of the Waterfront Alliance from 2007 until 2020.
