= Faherty =

Faherty is an Irish surname that may refer to

- Adrian Faherty (born 1988), Gaelic football goalkeeper with London
- Jackie Faherty, American astronomer
- JG Faherty (born 1961), American author
- Mary Faherty (born 1960), Irish judge
- Terence Faherty (born 1954), American author of mystery novels
- Vinny Faherty (born 1987), Irish football player

== Other ==
- Faherty Brand, American clothing company
