= Municipal Art Society =

Nonprofit membership organization in New York City

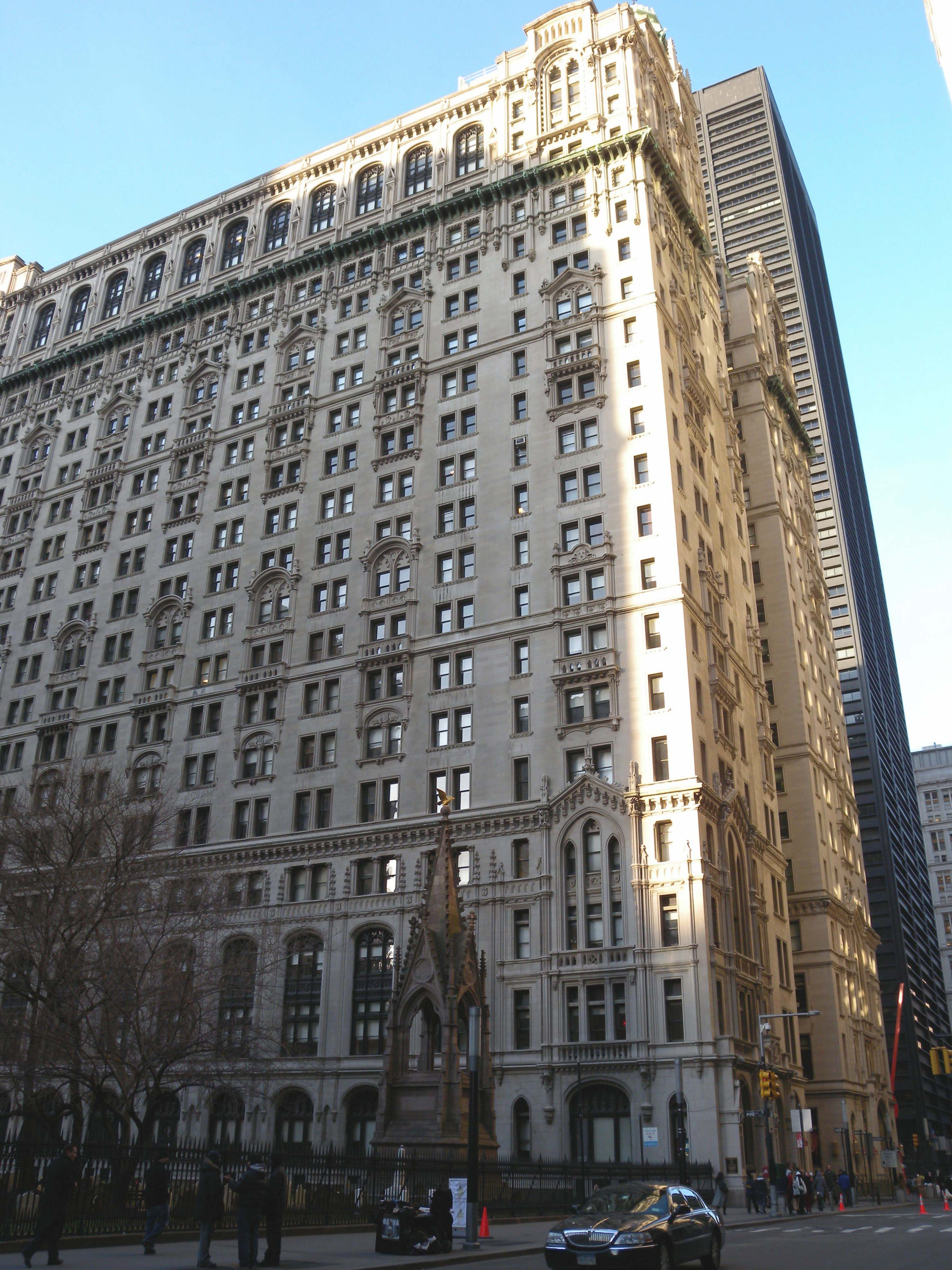
Headquarters at 115 Broadway

The Municipal Art Society of New York (MAS) is a non-profit membership organization for preservation in New York City, which aims to encourage thoughtful planning and urban design and inclusive neighborhoods across the city.

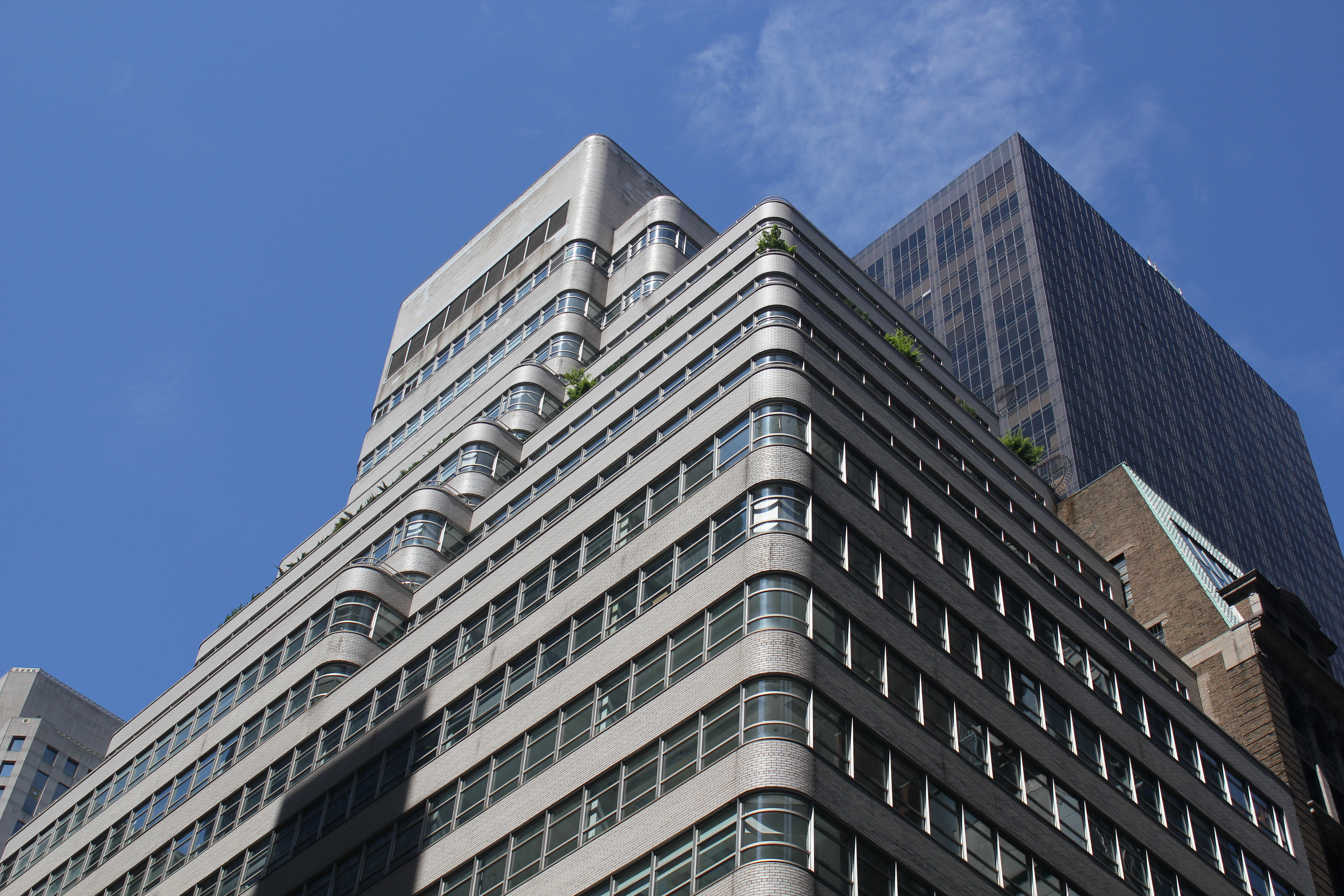
Former headquarters, the LOOK Building at 488 Madison Avenue

The organization was founded in 1893. In January 2010, MAS relocated from its longtime home in the historic Villard Houses on 457 Madison Avenue to Steinway Hall on West 57th Street (across the street and east of Carnegie Hall). In July 2014, MAS moved into the Look Building at 488 Madison Avenue, across the street from its former Villard home. In February 2025, MAS moved into one of the Trinity and United States Realty Buildings in the Financial District.

== History ==
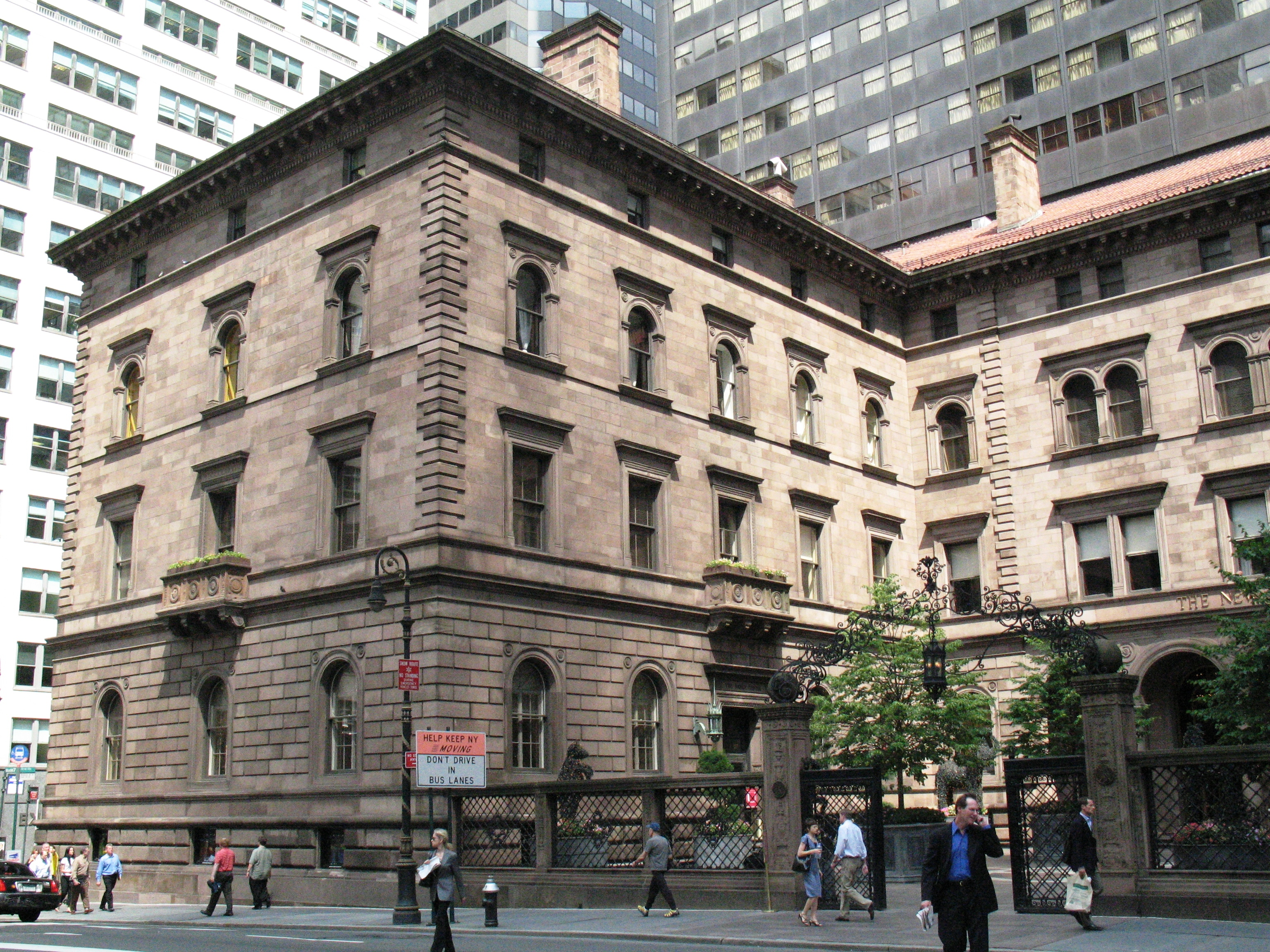
Former headquarters, the Villard Houses at 457 Madison Avenue

MAS's advocacy efforts have shaped the city a great deal since its inception in 1893. Some of their early accomplishments include passage of the city's first zoning laws, contributing input to the planning of the city's subway line, and the commissioning of public art throughout the city.

By the 1950s, scores of notable Manhattan buildings were lost to redevelopment around the city, and the mission of MAS broadened to include historical preservation. In 1956, the Society successfully lobbied for the passage of the Bard Law, which for the first time allowed cities to take aesthetics, history, and cultural associations into account for zoning laws. The law, named after longtime MAS board member and chief advocate, Albert S. Bard, provided a legal foundation for the New York City Landmarks Law, enacted in 1965.

In 1965, public outrage over the destruction of Pennsylvania Station and the Brokaw Mansion helped fuel the Society's mission towards preservation. With like-minded groups, they finally succeeded in establishing New York's Landmarks Preservation Commission, and New York's Landmarks Law.

In 2001, after the demise of Trans World Airlines, the original Trans World Flight Center, completed in 1962 and designed by Eero Saarinen, fell into disuse. During this period, the Municipal Art Society succeeded in 2004 in nominating the facility to the National Trust for Historic Preservation's list of the 11 Most Endangered Places.

In June 2007, MAS released with the Metropolitan Waterfront Alliance a new documentary about the future of the New York waterfront titled City of Water. In September 2007, the Society opened a major exhibition about Jane Jacobs sponsored by the Rockefeller Foundation.

== Urban Center ==
The Municipal Art Society used to operate out of the Urban Center, a gallery on Madison Avenue. The gallery, founded in 1980, served to champion the fields of urban planning and design in New York, and was also the site of MAS' community development workshops, seminars, lectures, and other educational programs. The Urban Center also included a book store, called Urban Center Books, which specialized in architecture, urban planning, urban design, and environmental studies.

The Urban Center was located in Villard Houses from 1980 to 2010 whereupon it moved to West 57th Street.

The Center stopped operating when the Municipal Art Society moved to 488 Madison Avenue in 2014.

== Advocacy ==
Through its advocacy, MAS protects New York's legacy spaces, encourages thoughtful planning and urban design, and fosters complete neighborhoods across the five boroughs. Since 2007, the organization has hosted the Livable Neighborhoods Program (LNP). This program helps local leaders in under-resourced communities throughout New York City develop the knowledge and tools that they need to participate effectively in public land use review processes, plus engage in creative, community-based design and planning. Past alumni of the program include, Landmark East Harlem, Brownsville Community Justice Center, and Asian Americans for Equality.

MAS organizes advocacy campaigns to address issues facing the city, including comprehensive, community-based urban planning, open space, and affordable housing. Recent advocacy campaigns include Fight For Light, Towards Comprehensive Planning, and Greener Corridors for a More Resilient City. MAS is a part of the Alliance for Public Space Leadership (APSL), founded in 2022 along with New York City's chapter of the American Institute of Architects, Open Plans, New Yorkers for Parks, and the Design Trust for Public Space. The alliance, which now includes more than 50 organizations, advocated for the appointment of New York City's first Chief Public Realm Officer. Mayor Eric Adams appointed Ya-Ting Liu to the position in 2023.

A notable project supported and funded by the Society was the 1980 documentary film The Social Life of Small Urban Spaces by William H. Whyte. The film was digitized by Anthology Film Archives in 2025, in collaboration with MAS and the Project for Public Spaces.

== Tours and programs ==
Since 1956, the Municipal Art Society has offered walking tours about architecture and history across the five boroughs. MAS offers both virtual and in-person tours throughout the year. Additionally, the Municipal Art Society produces programming all across the city throughout the year, including book talks and panel conversations.

Since 2011, MAS has hosted the New York City chapter of the global Jane's Walk festival, which celebrates the legacy of urbanist Jane Jacobs. Jane's Walk occurs annually the first weekend in May. For the New York City festival, the walks range from any New York City topic, including culture, history, nature and more. There were over 200 walks across the five boroughs included in the 2025 festival, which occurred May 2-4.

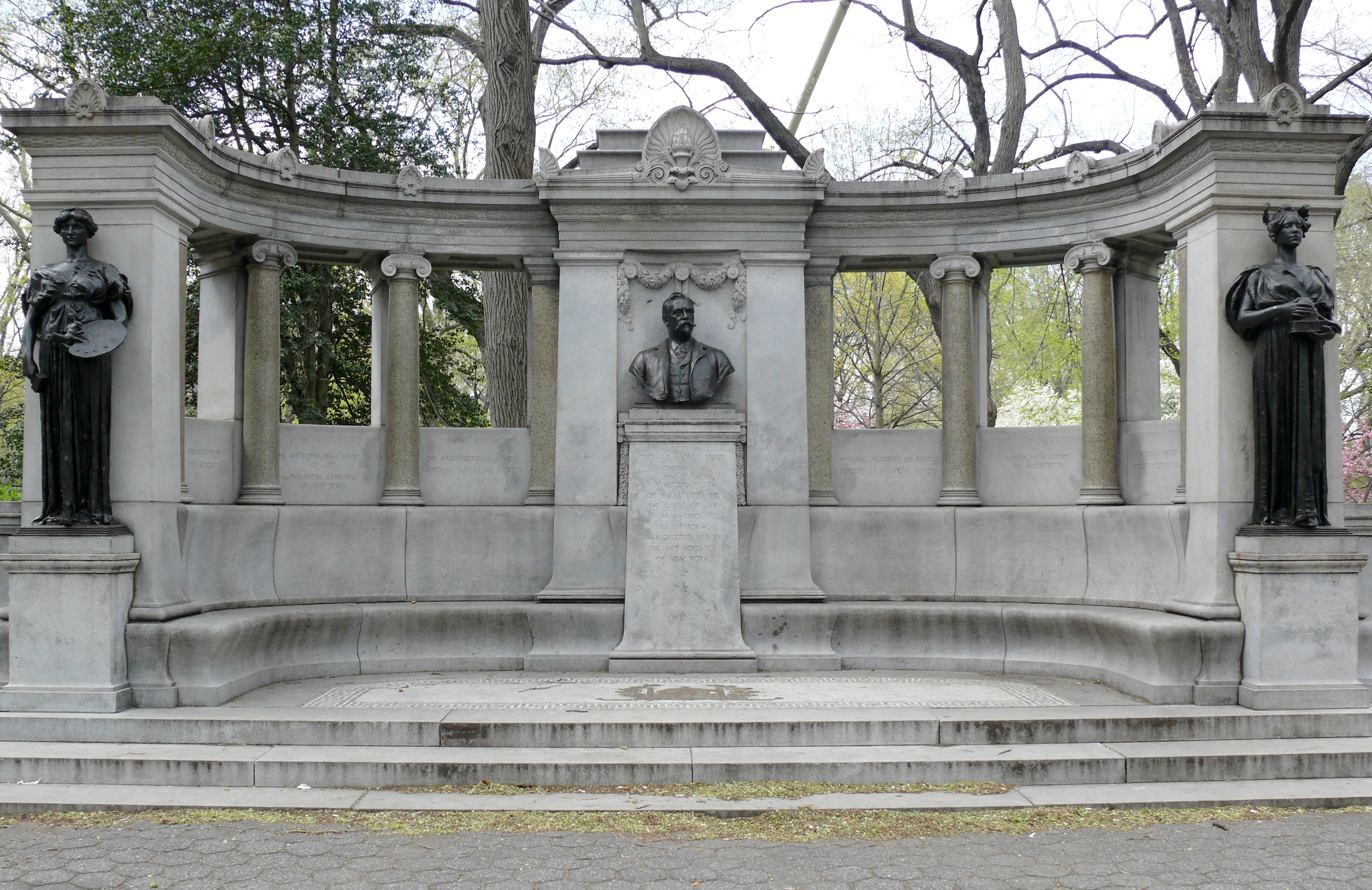
The Richard Morris Hunt Memorial in Central Park, honoring the organization's founder

== Awards ==
Since 1987, the Municipal Art Society of New York has annually awarded the Brendan Gill Prize to the creator of a creative work that "best captures the spirit and energy of New York City." The award was established in honor of Brendan Gill, New Yorker theater and architecture critic and long-time MAS Board Member. Past honorees have included Sufjan Stevens, Kara Walker, Julia Wolfe, Michael Kimmelman, Questlove, Louis Malle, André Gregory, Stephen Maing, John Wilson, Rebecca Solnit, Linda Goode Bryant, Ang Lee, and Gran Fury.

Since 2001, MAS has annually awarded six MASterworks Awards to exceptional New York City architecture and landscape architecture projects from the previous year. The list of past winners includes Weeksville Heritage Center, David Geffen Hall, Tenement Museum, Domino Park, Brooklyn Public Library, Powerhouse Arts, Little Island, and Moynihan Train Hall.

== See also ==
- New York City arts organizations
