= Armitage Avenue =

Street in Chicago, Illinois

- 2000 North
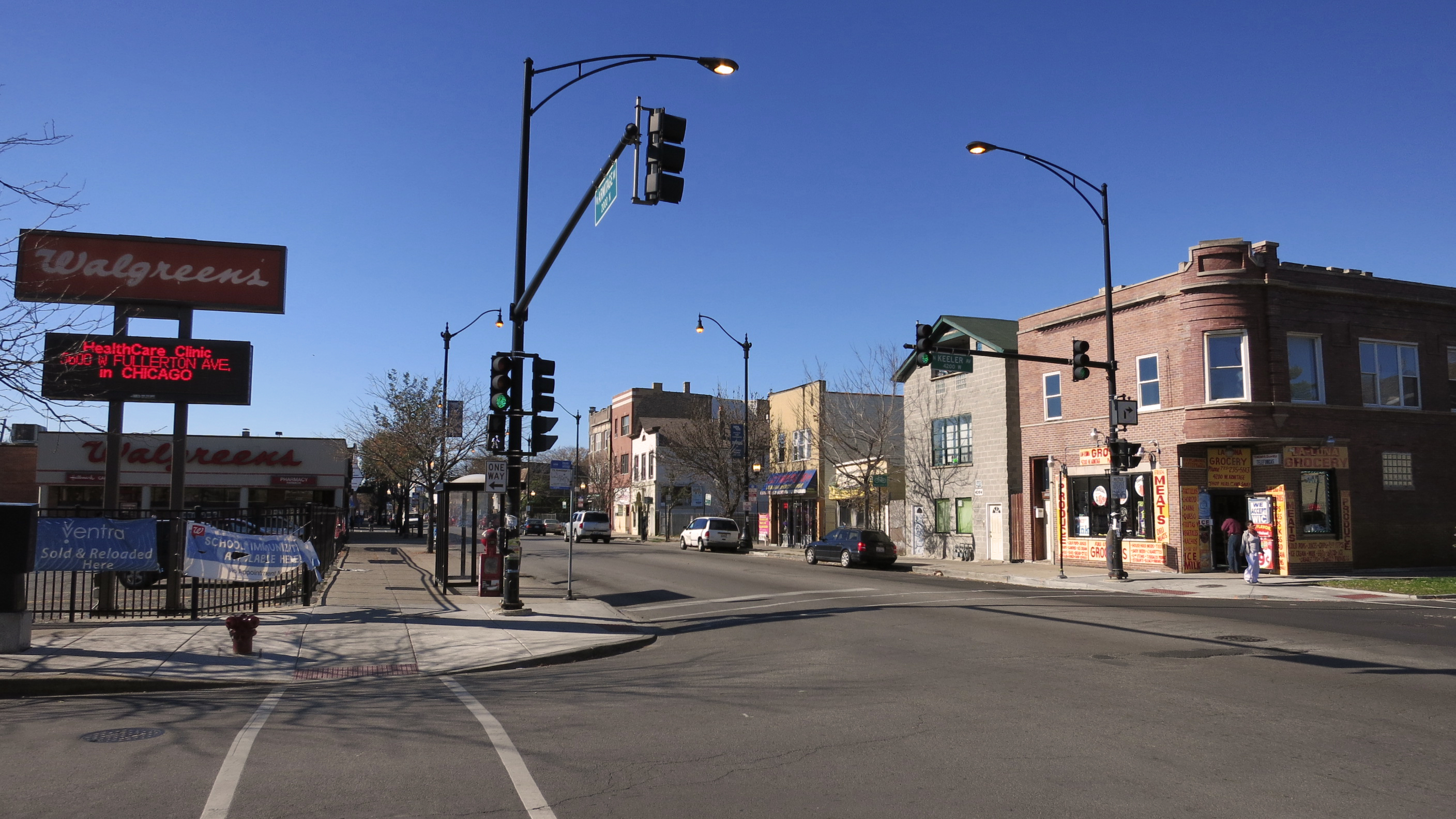
- Armitage Avenue at Keeler Avenue
- Length: 11.51 mi (18.52 km)
- Location: Chicago
- West end: President Street in Glendale Heights
- East end: Clark Street in Chicago

Armitage Avenue is an east–west street in Chicago and its western suburbs, being located at 2000 North in the Chicago address system, two and one-half miles north of Madison Street. Its west end is located at President Street in the western suburb of Glendale Heights. In the western suburbs, it is a minor road, being split into many segments, usually by freeways. Armitage Avenue becomes a major street at its intersection with Grand Avenue in Chicago, continuing east until Mendell Street, just east of its interchange with Interstates 90 and 94 (Kennedy Expressway), and just west of the North Branch of the Chicago River. Immediately east of the river, it resumes as a minor road, beginning at a cul-de-sac, heading east until Southport Avenue. At Racine Avenue, Armitage Avenue is once again a major street. From here, it continues east until its east end at Clark Street, just west of Lincoln Park.

== Route description ==
=== President Street to Central Avenue ===
Armitage Avenue begins at President Street in Glendale Heights. The road continues east for 2.1 miles (3.38 km) to Wayne Avenue.

The next two segments of Armitage Avenue are in Lombard. Armitage Avenue starts again at Swift Road and continues for 0.04 miles (0.06 km) before ending in a cul-de-sac. The next segment starts in a cul-de-sac and ends at Helen Street. This segment is 0.03 miles (0.05 km) long.

The next two segments are in Addison. Armitage Avenue continues at a cul-de-sac for 0.2 miles (0.32 km) and ends at Rohlwing Road. The road resumes at Addison Road and also goes through Villa Park for 0.9 miles (1.45 km) before stopping at Villa Avenue.

The following two segments of Armitage Avenue lies entirely within Elmhurst. The road resumes east of the Cricket Creek Forest Preserve at Garden Avenue, a frontage road of Illinois Route 83 (Kingery Highway). The road goes for 1.24 miles (2.00 km) until turning south as Addison Avenue. Armitage Avenue begins again at Indiana Street, continuing 0.31 miles (0.50 km) until turning north as Adele Street. The two segments in Elmhurst are split because of U.S. Route 20/Interstate 290 (Eisenhower Expressway).

Armitage Avenue's eighth and ninth segments are located in Melrose Park. It begins at Wolf Road in Northlake. One mile further east, it intersects U.S. Route 12/U.S. Route 45 (Mannheim Road). This segment, 2.02 miles (3.25 km) ends at 25th Avenue. The ninth segment begins at a cul-de-sac west of 19th Avenue, and continues 0.56 miles (0.90 km) until ending at a cul-de-sac east of George Street.

The tenth segment of Armitage Avenue is located in Elmwood Park and the city of Chicago. Beginning at 78th Avenue in Elmwood Park, it continues east for 1.50 miles (2.41 km) until Nashville Avenue in Chicago. Halfway between these two streets, Armitage Avenue intersects Illinois Route 43 (Harlem Avenue), the border of Elmwood Park and Chicago.

The eleventh segment of Armitage Avenue is located entirely within the city of Chicago, as are the remainder of the segments. It runs 0.22 miles (0.35 km) from Menard Avenue to a cul-de-sac just west of Central Avenue.

=== Grand Avenue to Clark Street ===
The twelfth and longest segment of Armitage Avenue (4.47 miles (7.19 km)) begins at Grand Avenue. The road intersects streets including Illinois Route 50 (Cicero Avenue), Pulaski Road, Kedzie Avenue, Milwaukee Avenue, and Western Avenue. The road then has an interchange with Interstates 90/94 (Kennedy Expressway). Next, Armitage Avenue crosses Elston Avenue. This segment finally ends east of the Kennedy Expressway at Mendell Street, just west of the North Branch of the Chicago River.

Armitage Avenue's thirteenth segment is a 0.06 miles (0.10 km) long road, beginning at Southport Avenue, and going west until a cul-de-sac east of the North Branch of the Chicago River. As of July 2023, this segment is currently inaccessible to pedestrian or vehicular traffic. The plans for the Lincoln Yards development project, which broke ground in 2021, indicate that this segment would no longer exist if the project continues according to plan.

The fourteenth and final segment of Armitage Avenue is 1.14 miles (1.83 km) long. Beginning at Racine Avenue, the road continues east, intersecting Sheffield Avenue, Halsted Street, and Lincoln Avenue. Armitage Avenue finally ends at Clark Street, just west of Lincoln Park.

== History ==
The easternmost part of the street, east of LaSalle Street, became the northernmost extent of the City of Chicago upon its incorporation on March 4, 1837. The part east of Sedgwick Avenue was added to the City on February 14, 1851, and that east of the North Branch of the Chicago River on February 12, 1853. The segment east of Western Avenue was annexed on February 13, 1863, and that east of Kedzie Avenue annexed from the Town of Jefferson effective May 25, 1887. The remainder of the street in Chicago became part of the City upon its annexation of the entirety of Jefferson on July 15, 1889.

The street is either named for A. Armitage, an early Chicago mason, or Thomas Armitage, founder of the American Bible Union. Although the name "Armitage Avenue" is attested from as early as 1868, the part east of Racine avenue was known as Center Street before October 7, 1936.

== Transportation ==
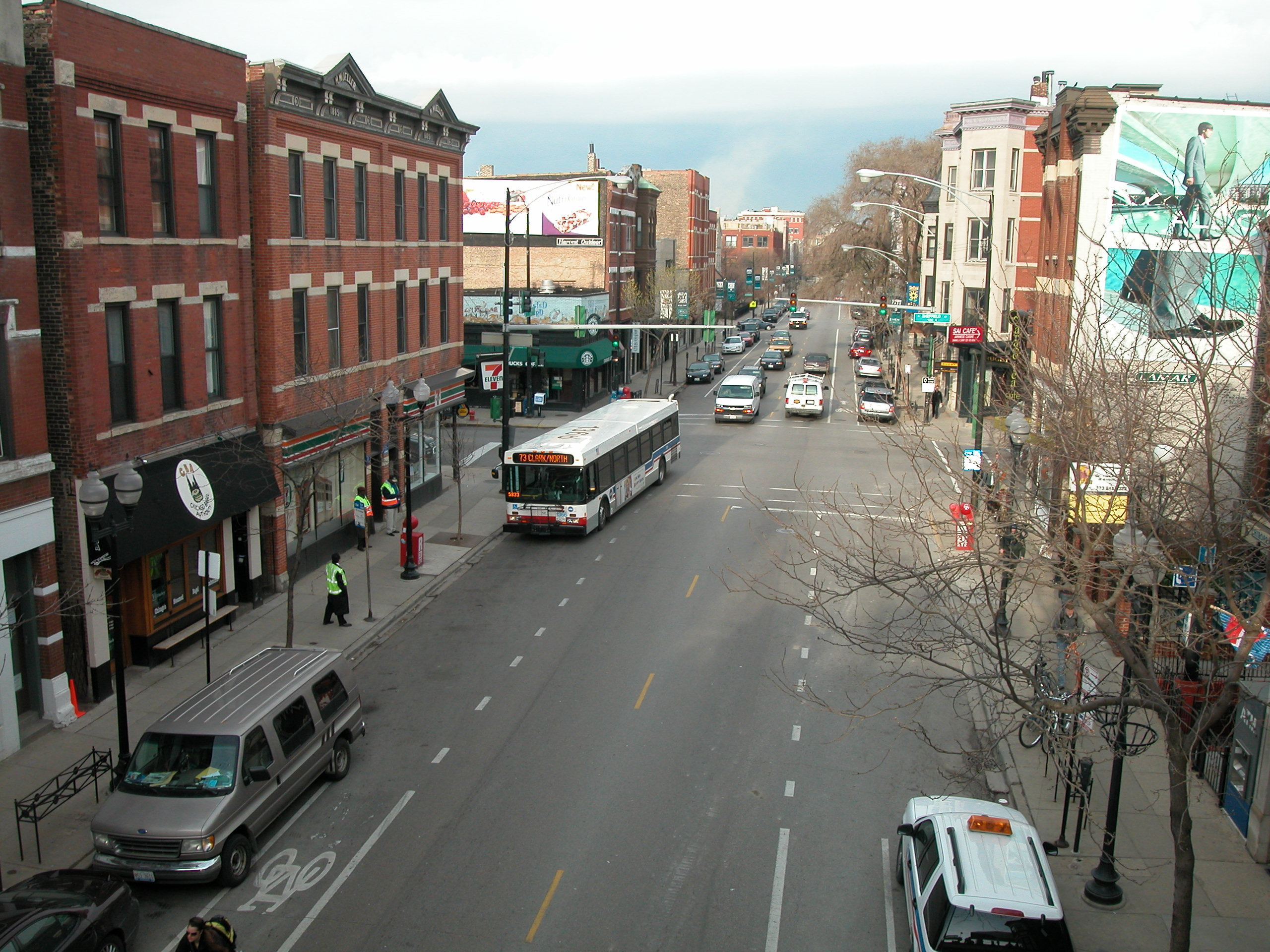
Armitage Avenue at Sheffield Avenue, viewed from the Armitage "L" station

Armitage Avenue is served by 73 Armitage between Grand Avenue and Hermitage Avenue and between Racine Avenue and Clark Street. The bus route runs from Latrobe Avenue at Grand Avenue to North Avenue at Clark Street.

The following CTA lines stop at Armitage Avenue:

- Brown Line/Purple Line Express at Sheffield Avenue
- Blue Line at Western and Milwaukee Avenues (auxiliary entrance on Armitage Avenue)

== See also ==
- RANCH Triangle
