= Kambara Tai =

Japanese painter (1899–1997)

- 神原 泰
- Born: February 23, 1899; Sumiyoshi-ku, Osaka
- Died: March 28, 1997 (aged 98); Yokohama
- Occupations: Writer, poet, art critic
- Writing career
- Pen name: Tai
- Language: Japanese
- Period: Taishō
- Genre: Futurism
- Literary movement: Avant-garde

Kambara Tai (Japanese: 神原 泰, Hepburn: Tai Kambara) (23 February 1899 – 28 March 1997), real name Kambara Yasushi, artist name Tai, was a Japanese poet, painter, writer, art critic and Japanese futurism pioneer.

== Life ==
Kambara was born in Sendai, Osaka, but his family soon moved to Tokyo.

He started out as a poet, but then temporarily turned to painting. In 1917 he submitted his paintings for the exhibition of the artists' association Nika-kai (二 科 会). In 1920 Kambara founded the avant-garde art group Action (アクション, Akushon) together with Harue Koga, Kigen Nakagawa (中 川 紀元; 1892–1972), Junnosuke Yokoyama (横山 潤 之 助; 1903–1971) and others. It was part of the group Future Wings of Art (未来 派 美術 協会, Mirai-ha bijutsu kyōkai), abbreviated to "MAVO" (マヴォ). He then founded the art group Sanka (三 科) in 1925 followed by Layout (造形, Zōkei), from which he withdrew in 1927. This was also when he ceased his painting activities.

Kambara exchanged letters with futurist Filippo Tommaso Marinetti and wrote numerous publications about futurism. In 1990 he donated his material on Picasso and the avant-garde movement as the "Kambara Tai Library" to the Ohara Museum of Art in Kurashiki.

He died as a result of heart failure on March 28, 1997, in Minami-ku, Yokohama at the age of 98.

== Literature ==
- Japanese Modern Art: Painting from 1910 to 1970, Edition Stemmle, Zürich – New York, 1999, ISBN 3-908161-86-X

== Expositions ==
- 1917 – 4e Nika-ten, Tokyo
- 1923 – Action, Tokyo, Mitsukoshi
- 1925 – Sanka Society, Tokyo, Matsuzakaya
- 1936 – Kayu (Friends of Painting), Tokyo, Itoya
- 1986 – Japanese Avant-garde 1910–1970, Paris, Centre Georges Pompidou
- 1988 – 1920s in Japan, National Museum of Modern Art, Tokyo
- 1992 – Abstract art in Japan 1910–1945, Tokyo, Itabashi Museum of Art
- 1993 – Japan and Europa 1543–1929, Berlin, Martin-Gropius-Bau
