= Faherty Brand =

American clothing brand

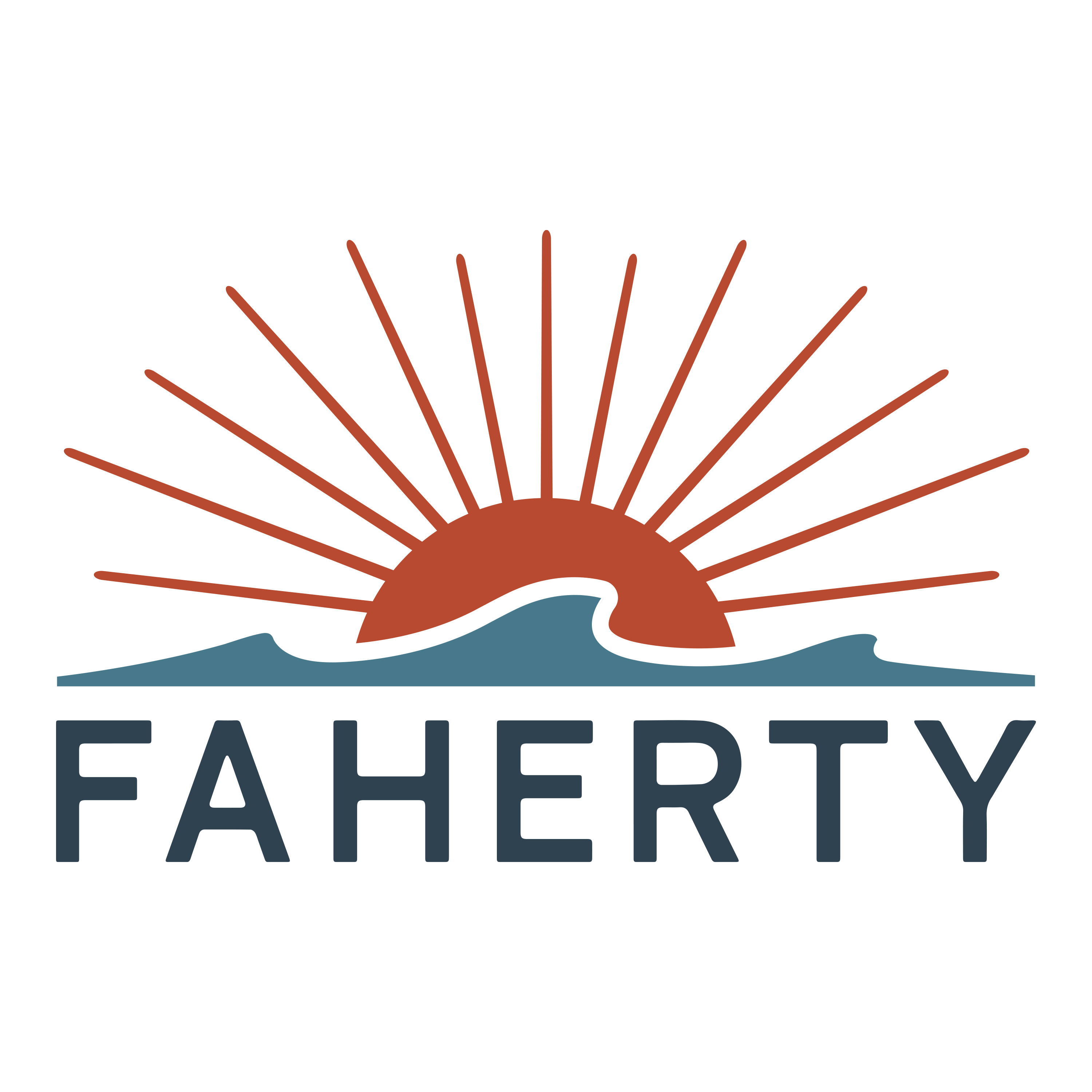
- Industry: Clothing
- Founder: Alex & Mike Faherty
- Number of locations: 80+ (2026)
- Area served: United States & Canada
- Number of employees: 500+ (2025)
- Website: fahertybrand.com

Faherty Brand is an American clothing company founded in 2013 by twin brothers Alex and Mike Faherty. Its aesthetic was described as "surf hippie" by The New York Times. As of 2026, the company has over 80 brick and mortar stores and their clothing brand is sold in over 250 stores worldwide. They are a certified B Corporation.

== History ==
Faherty Brand was created in 2013 by twin brothers, Alex and Mike Faherty. The brothers grew up in Spring Lake, New Jersey, where they spent their childhood surfing and exposed to surfing culture. Mike Faherty began curating a "surfwear" style in high school, and wrote a college essay on a business idea for a "Coast to Curb" clothing line. He studied fashion design at Washington University in St. Louis, then worked at Ralph Lauren for eight years, designing for their Double RL line. Alex graduated from Yale University with a major in political science. Mike and Alex's mother, interior designer Ninie Norris, designed Faherty's first stores and Alex's wife, Kerry Docherty, joined as chief impact officer, focusing on social impact. The brothers founded Faherty Brand with the idea of creating the "perfect" board short, which had both a shorter inseam and added cotton, with a wash technique for softness and comfort.

In 2013, Faherty Brand released its first full clothing line in a "Beach Shack on Wheels," which they drove cross-country and sold their line through local boutiques. By 2014, Faherty Brand was sold in department stores such as Barneys New York, Bloomingdale's and Nordstrom, in addition to about 60 boutiques. In 2016, they opened the first store in Malibu, California. The company moved to brick-and-mortar retail during the COVID-19 pandemic when the dip in the real estate market allowed the Faherty brothers to purchase stores at a lower price. In the spring of 2020, Faherty Brand launched a full women's collection, with dresses being particularly popular, accounting for 40% of all women's sales.

By early 2020, the company opened 13 stores and by 2026 had opened over 80 stores. Faherty Brand has a retail presence in major cities including New York, Boston, Washington, Los Angeles, as well as in resort towns. In March 2026, Faherty Brand opened their first international store in Biarritz, France. The brand is sold in over 250 stores worldwide. The company's supply chain spans Europe, South America, North America, and Asia.

One of the communities that Faherty Brand has particularly invested in is the Native American community. The brand, anticipating criticism for appropriating Native American designs, announced plans to establish long-term relationships with Native American designers.

Faherty opened its flagship store at 133 Prince Street in SoHo, Manhattan and expanded the store in June 2026.

== Sustainability ==
The brand's approach to sustainability has been described as focusing more on action rather than political pronouncements.

Faherty Brand is a certified B Corporation, a member of One Percent for the Planet, and donates 1% of its revenue to environmental initiatives. The company uses recycled polyester yarn made from water bottles. In February 2025, the company began selling a t-shirt made from regenerative cotton that requires less water for production.

In the summer of 2026, Faherty collaborated with Quiksilver and opened "Faherty's Surf Shop," a temporary pop-up shop in Nolita for the "Faherty x Quiksilver" collection. The collection included boardshorts made from recycled fishing-net nylon.

=== Second Wave Resale Program ===
In June 2023, Faherty Brand announced the launch of its resale initiative, named "Second Wave", in partnership with Archive. The program is designed to enable customers to buy and sell pre-owned Faherty products.

== See also ==
- Buck Mason
- Bonobos
- Indochino
