= State & Liberty Clothing =

American clothing company

State & Liberty Clothing Company
- Type: Private
- Industry: Men's Apparel, e-Commerce, Retail
- Founded: 2015
- Founders: Lee Moffie, Steven Fisher, Jacob Allain
- Headquarters: Ann Arbor, Michigan
- Key people: Lee Moffie (co-founder and CEO); Jacob Allain (co-founder and COO)
- Website: stateandliberty.com

State and Liberty Clothing Company (styled State & Liberty or S&L) is an American clothing e-commerce company that specializes in athletic fit performance fabric menswear. The company is led by Lee Moffie, co-founder and chief executive officer, and Jacob Allain, co-founder and chief operating officer. The company operates over 50 retail stores in the US and Canada. The brand’s signature athletic fit dress shirts are made from its Pro Performance Fabric, a 92% polyester and 8% Spandex blend that is lightweight, moisture-wicking, and very stretchy.

== History ==
The company was founded in 2015 in Ann Arbor, Michigan, by University of Michigan friends Steven Fisher and Lee Moffie. Moffie and Fisher both graduated from the university, where they met through Order of Angell, a senior honor society at the university. The two decided to name the company after an intersection in Ann Arbor, in honor of the town.

Prior to founding, Moffie played professional ice hockey for the Denver Cutthroats and the South Carolina Stingrays following his four-year varsity letter (2009–13) with the Michigan Wolverines Ice Hockey under Red Berenson. Fisher’s background lies in business data analytics and complex systems, leading a data analytics initiative for the Detroit Tigers and working on various other projects for startups and larger organizations as a consultant.

State & Liberty was founded to solve the fit problem that athletic men have with off-the-rack dress shirts in traditional pure cotton. Inspired by Lululemon and athleisure apparel trends using manmade fabrics, the duo prototyped hundreds of fabrics and dress shirt fits on professional hockey players to accommodate their ‘V-shaped’ body type. Eventually, they created Athletic Performance Fabric (APF) and made dress shirts that fit athletic men.

== Products ==
State and Liberty started as a fully self-funded small business. The company's product line includes athletic-fitting, moisture-wicking, and wrinkle-free dress shirts. In October 2016, State & Liberty launched a partnership with the Professional Hockey Players' Association.

In 2017, the company introduced multiple products, including a polo shirt, a long-sleeve polo shirt, and an overcoat. State and Liberty opened two pop-up locations in late 2017, one on Newbury Street in Boston, Massachusetts and one in Georgetown, Washington, D.C.

== Philanthropy ==
State & Liberty supports Autism Speaks, sponsored by James van Riemsdyk, an NHL left winger for the Toronto Maple Leafs, by donating a portion of proceeds to the foundation. In mid-2016, State & Liberty launched "The Morgan" shirt to benefit the Jordan Morgan Foundation. Later in 2016, State & Liberty launched ‘The Matzka’ dress shirt in support of Scott Matzka and to raise money for research on ALS.
