= Rondo Young Artist Festival =

Rondo Young Artist Festival is an International Concert Showcase set up to encourage young musicians to further their musical talents. It is an independent and unaffiliated non-profit organization. The goal of the festival and organization is to build confidence in the participants, prepare them for their lives ahead, help them start their musical careers and promote the spread of classical music.

Rondo Young Artist Festival is open to all instrumentalists, vocalists, as well as chamber ensembles representing all musical traditions ages five through eighteen. The judges evaluate the participant’s technique, musicality and overall performance. Winners of the Festival perform on concert stages in New York and Connecticut including the Greenwich Arts Center, Steinway Hall, Liederkranz Foundation and Carnegie Hall, NYC. All participants receive detailed comments from the judges, and are awarded winners' certificates.
