= Indochino =

Menswear retailer

- Type: Privately held company
- Industry: Apparel
- Founded: 2007
- Founders: Kyle Vucko and Heikal Gani
- Headquarters: Vancouver, British Columbia
- Number of locations: 79 (October 2021)
- Key people: Drew Green, CEO
- Products: Made-to-measure suits and casual menswear and womenswear

Indochino is a Canadian retailer that offers made-to-measure custom suiting, casual wear, and outerwear. Originally founded as an exclusively online retailer, Indochino has opened 90 showrooms in Canada, the United States, and Australia. The company is headquartered in Vancouver, British Columbia, with a second office in Shanghai, China.

== History ==
Indochino was founded by Kyle Vucko and Heikal Gani. In late 2015, Vucko stepped down and Drew Green, the founder of Shop.ca, joined Indochino as chief executive officer.

Indochino was one of the first web-only retailers to open physical stores, initially through pop-up shops before opening permanent showrooms. In showrooms, customers work with a "style guide" who helps them design their garment, which is made to measure and shipped in around two weeks.

In 2016, Indochino raised funding from investors, opening about 80 showrooms in North America.

In 2017, Indochino entered into a strategic marketing partnership with Postmedia, a Canadian media company, receiving $40 million in advertising in exchange for an undisclosed share of its reveneue. In 2018, Indochino received a "strategic investment" from Mitsui & Co. under undisclosed terms.

In 2019, Indochino announced that it was expanding internationally and launching its online operations in Australia.

In 2021, the company partnered with Nordstrom to open 21 custom apparel stores-within-a-store at Nordstrom locations.

Currently, Indochino guides clients in the store location to find the styles, measure each person to order, and sends this information to their manufacturer located overseas in China (and possibly other more "affordable" labor forces overseas). It takes approximately two weeks for the suit to be created/fashioned overseas and shipped to you.
