= Itoya =

Japanese stationery brand

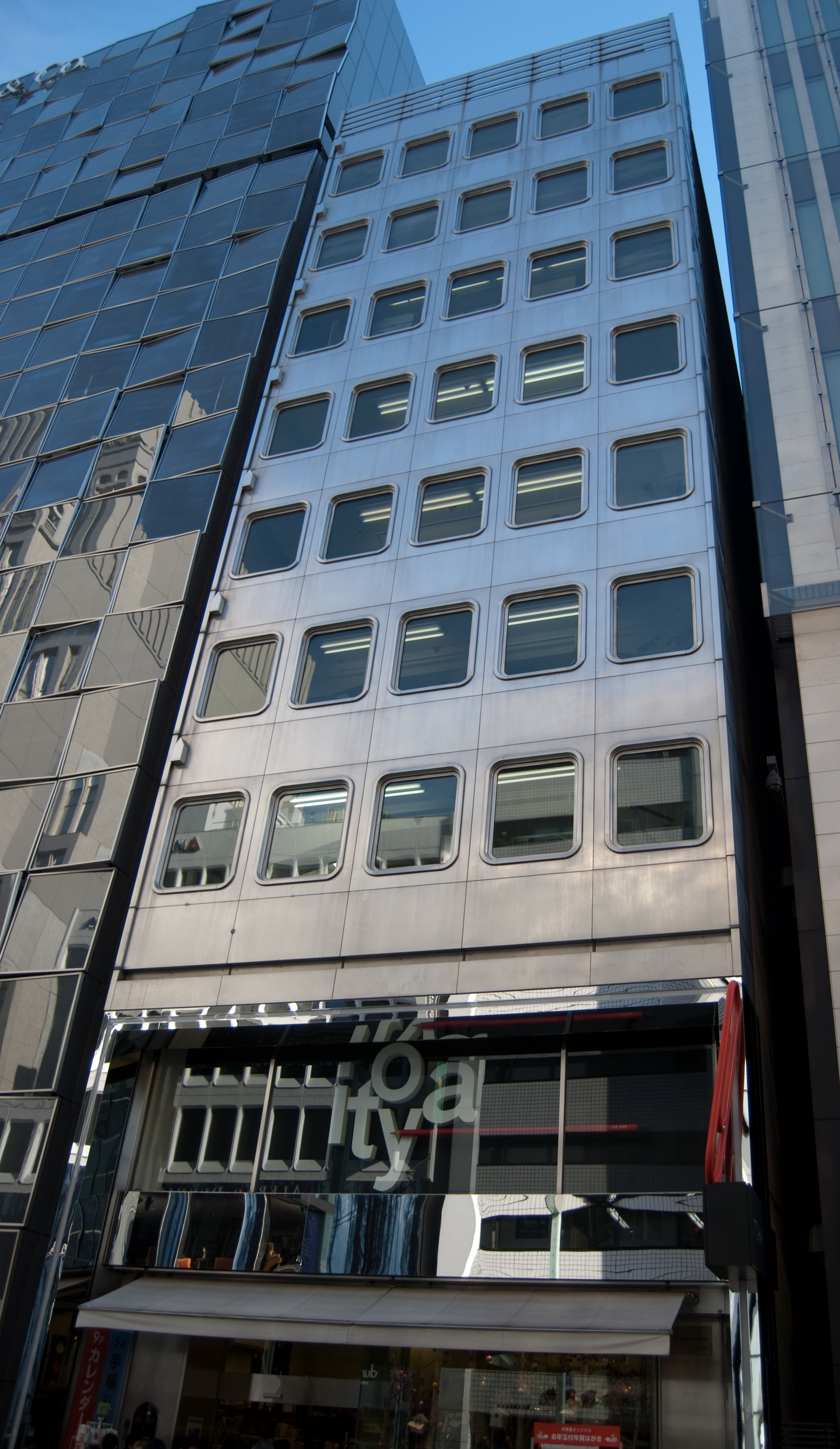
Itoya store in Ginza, Tokyo

Itoya (Japanese: 伊東屋; stylized as ITO-YA) is a Japanese stationery brand founded in 1904 (Meiji 37) in Ginza, Tokyo.

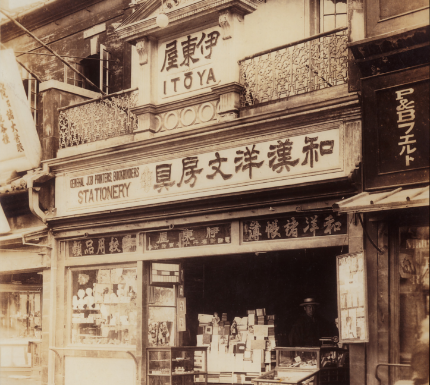
Itoya in early years

Its original location was destroyed in the 1923 Great Kantō earthquake.

== Topdrawer ==
Its American subsidiary, ITOYA of America, Ltd., was established in 1976. Itoya operates another subsidiary company called Topdrawer, headquartered in Boston. Topdrawer has retail stores in Japan and 18 locations in the US. Its US locations include Boston, New York, San Francisco, Los Angeles, and Chicago. Topdrawer is managed by its president Peter Dunn. Its mission is to offer better tools for creative people and focusses on timeless products such as Japanese Creative Tools and Paper, House Shoes, Eyewear, Organic Cotton Bags, Fine Pens and Notebooks.

== Merci ticket ==
In 1953, a consumer loyalty program called Merci ticket was created: 100-yen ticket (orange), 50-yen ticket (yellow), 10-yen ticket (green) were issued for purchases of 2,000 yen, 1,000 yen, and 200 yen (effectively 5% return, no expiration date) to be used for future purchases. Similar return tickets were also seen at Tokyu Hands stationery tickets and local stationery stores. Issuance of Merci tickets ended in January 2009. After that, the issue of card-type Merci cards or Merci apps (return rate 3%, expiration date 24 months from the last use date) was shifted. Unused Merci tickets can be transferred as Merci card points at the Itoya Information Counter.
