= Plaza del Lago =

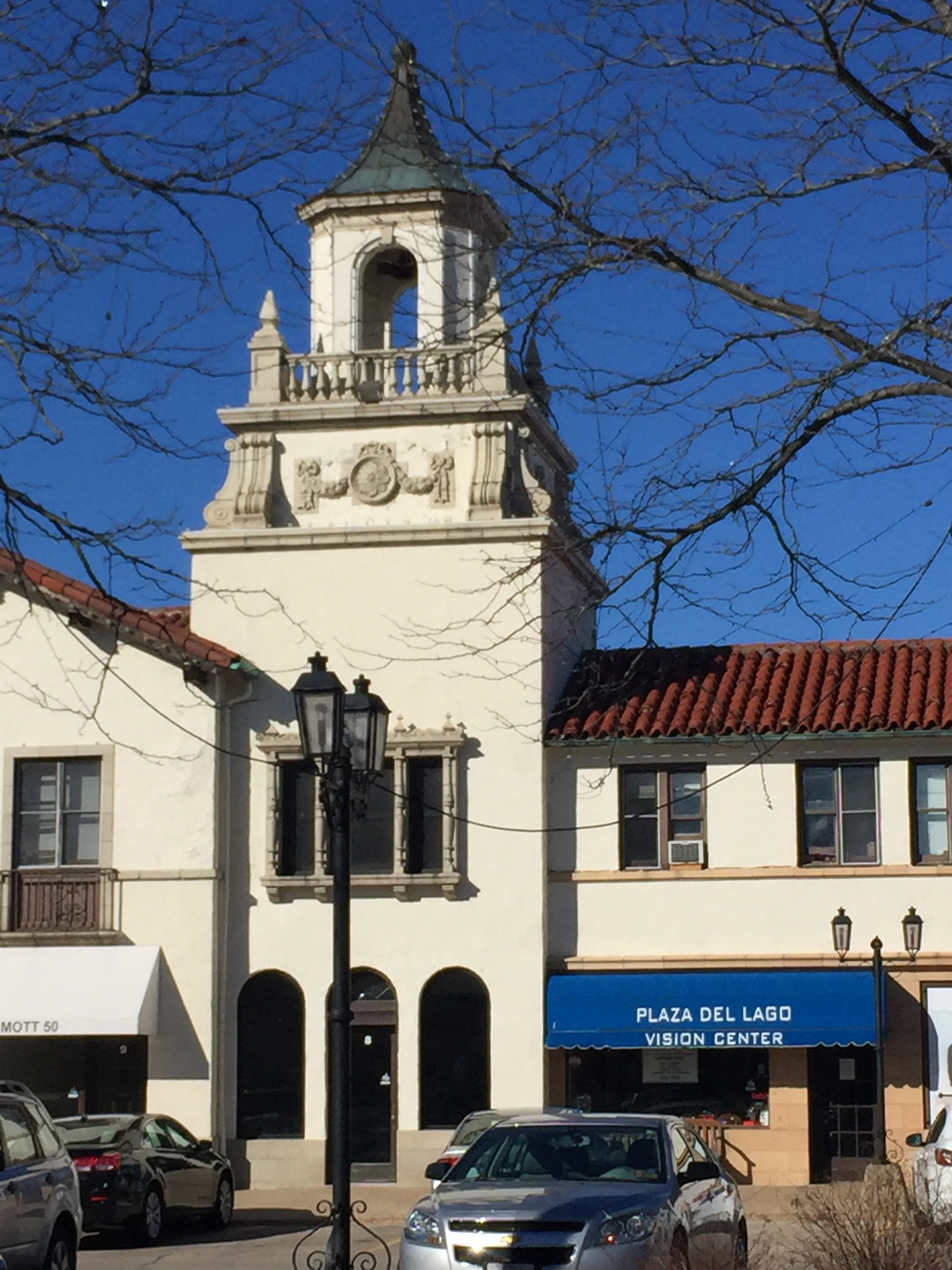
- Plaza del Lago bell tower
- Location: Wilmette, Illinois
- Coordinates: 42°05′13″N 87°42′05″W
- Address: 1515 Sheridan Rd
- Opened: 1928 (as the "Spanish Court")
- Previous names: Spanish Court
- Developer: Plato Foufas and Joseph Stefan (1960s redevelopment)
- Owner: Retail Properties of America
- Architect: Edwin Hill Clark
- Floor area: 100,200 sq ft (9,310 m^{2})
- Floors: Mostly 1 story (some buildings are 2 stories)
- Public transit: Pace bus route #423
- Website: plazadellago.com

Plaza del Lago is a shopping center at 1515 Sheridan Road in Wilmette, Illinois, United States. Opened in 1928 as Spanish Court, it is the second-oldest open air shopping center in the United States. Retail tenants include: DÔEN, Hermès, Hill House, Lily Pulitzer, Lola + The Boys, LoveShackFancy, James Perse, Jenni Kayne, Johnnie-O, Marfa Stance, Oscar de la Renta, Peter Millar, rag & bone, Thom Browne, Veronica Beard, and Zimmermann, and Brunello Cucinelli is planned for 2027.

== History ==
=== Background ===
Though the plaza is in the village of Wilmette today, the tract of land on which it was built was originally a part of an undeveloped area known as No Man's Land, a strip of land owned by Henry Gage which, for unclear reasons, was not annexed when the rest of Gage's property was annexed by Wilmette. The area started as underdeveloped land lined by three gas stations, and Sheridan was unpaved. When Wilmette released "Plan of Wilmette" (the basis of its first zoning code) it had planned to annex the land as a park, but it did not do so; by 1926 it had lost the chance.

=== Spanish Court ===
The Roaring '20s was a time of booming prosperity across the US. In the 1920s, an association of North Shore business people invested in a plan to turn primarily vacant land in No Man's Land into an elegant, Spanish-style retail and entertainment complex, named Spanish Court. Plans for this Spanish styled shopping center in No Man's Land were drawn up in 1926 and 1927 by the well-known architect, Edwin Hill Clark.

Spanish architecture was the style of the rich and famous during the 1920s. The plan was to build four buildings along the west of Sheridan Road. A drive would cut through the center of the plaza. South of the drive was to be a movie theater, Teatro del Lago and on the north a single story building holding a restaurant and shops. A larger building would be built next door with stores on the first floor and apartments on the second, with a 50 car garage. At the end of northwest side would be a five-story apartment building. The plaza was designed by Edwin H. Clark and opened in 1928. The arrangement of the shops, apartments and movie theater around a parking lot was a new idea at the time.

Amongst the complex's earliest occupants were Spanish Court Pharmacy, Teatro del Lago and Bills Realty (the realtor that first marketed Wilmette's Indian Hill Estates Subdivision).

The Teatro del Lago movie palace opened in 1927, before the opening of the rest of the Spanish Court. When it was opened, the theater had an organ to accompany silent films. Its interior was completed handsomely with Spanish-style details and seating for 1,300 people. As teenagers Charles H. Percy, Ann-Margret and Rock Hudson worked at the theater.

=== Plaza del Lago ===
A fire in No Man's Land in the 1930s destroyed most of the other prominent structures. No Man's Land had become a "honky tonk town" with gas stations, hot dog stands and a rat-infested garbage dump. Wilmette annexed No Man's Land on January 6, 1942.

In the early 1960s, Evanston lawyer Plato Foufas heard that a large section of No Man's Land might be up for sale. With lawyer Joseph Stefan's help, he acquired Spanish Court. They set out to renovate the shopping plaza, as well as the rest of No Man's Land, back to its former glory. Their renovation started in 1967. They tore down the 50-car garage to build arcade shops in an indoor hallway built to resemble a Spanish street (which included a fountain), built new structures in the former Teatro del Lago parking lot and tore down the five story apartment structure to build a store that was for years occupied by Blockbuster. The new center was to be named "Plaza del Lago".

In the 1960s, the theater had come under scrutiny when plans were made to remodel the shopping center. The owner of the Teatro, Sam Meyers, wanted to build a parking garage for movie patrons, but these plans were never finalized with the Wilmette village government. Meyers decided to sell to the developer. Foufas and Stefan demolished the Teatro del Lago in December 1965 and a Jewel supermarket was built at approximately the same spot.

The developers were financially forced to allow a Howard Johnson's restaurant to be built east of the Jewel at the southeast end of Plaza del Lago, but fought to prevent them from building their trademark orange roof. Howard Johnson's operated a restaurant here from 1967 to the early 1980s, including a restaurant named The Ground Round (where Charlie Trotter worked as a teen). Howard Johnson's did not fare well and closed. The last occupant of the premises was Convito Italiano, occupying it from 1982 until 2008, after when the building was demolished and replaced with a new stucco structure with three shops.

The Spanish Court was renamed Plaza del Lago after the remodeling was completed in 1967. Its main architectural feature is its bell tower, which has been a part of the plaza since its first incarnation. The plaza was appraised in 1979 as being successful due to the population density of the adjacent area and the lack of similar shopping centers nearby. Plato Foufas and Joseph Stefans also developed a strip of high-rise housing co-operatives which line the lakefront across Sheridan Road from Plaza del Lago.

In July 2017, the shopping center was placed on sale. Its longtime owner, Joseph Moss, had died four months earlier.

On January 3, 2018, it was announced that Retail Properties of America had purchased the shopping center for $48 million.

== Annual events ==
Annual events at the plaza include a summer concert series, an art show, a classic car show, sidewalk sales, and sometimes races for children. In winter, events can include carriage rides.

== See also ==
- From No Man's Land to Plaza del Lago
- No Man's Land, Illinois
- Edens Plaza –another shopping center in Wilmette
