= James Perse =

American clothing brand

James Perse in Walton Street, London

James Perse is an eponymous Californian clothing and lifestyle brand founded in 1996 with a minimalist aesthetic.

WWD named him the “king of California casual”, and Mr Porter describes the brand as: “No logos, no marketing, just timeless product.”

In 2015 the brand established new headquarters in Marina del Rey, California. In 2025 Oakley Capital made an equity investment. James Perse has over 60 stores worldwide, including St. Barth, Studio City, Abu Dhabi, Mexico City, São Paulo, Plaza del Lago in Wilmette, 8th arrondissement of Paris, and Seoul. The brand owns and operates two vacation villas in Mexico: “BRANDÍLERA” in Punta Mita and “GREY CAPE” in Cabo San Lucas.

== Personal life ==
Perse’s mother is real estate agent Linda Marks, and Perse’s father, Tommy Perse, founded the concept shop Maxfield in 1969.

Perse lives in Malibu, California with his wife, Brandi, and their two boys.

== See also ==
- rag & bone
- Buck Mason
- Jenni Kayne
- The Row
- Veronica Beard
