= Jenni Kayne =

American lifestyle brand

Jenni Kayne is a Los Angeles-based “California lifestyle brand” founded in 2003 by its eponymous designer.

The brand started as a boutique clothing label and became a lifestyle brand spanning apparel, home decor, furniture, and beauty, all sharing a "quiet luxury" aesthetic. The company generates $140 million in annual revenue.

== In popular culture ==
Meghan, Duchess of Sussex wore a Jenni Kayne cashmere sweater in her Netflix show, With Love, Meghan.

== See also ==
- rag & bone
- Buck Mason
- James Perse
