= Highland Park Village =

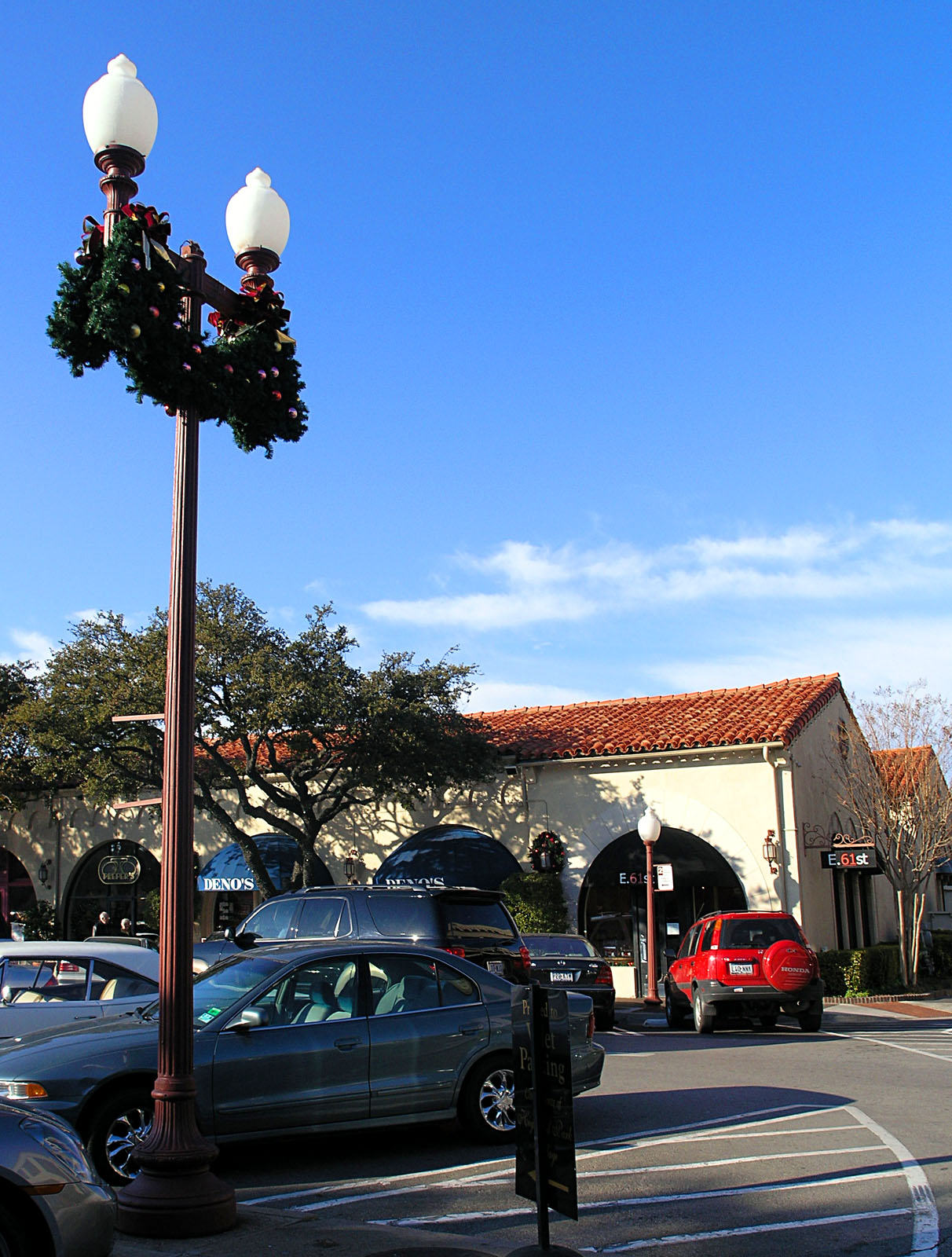
- Highland Park Village during the 2005 Christmas Season
- Location: Highland Park, Texas, United States
- Coordinates: 32°50′9″N 96°48′20″W
- Address: Jct. of Preston Rd. and Mockingbird Ln.
- Opened: 1931; 95 years ago
- Developer: Flippen-Prather Realty, Inc.
- Manager: HP Village Partners, LP
- Owner: HP Village Partners, LP
- Architect: Marion F. Fooshee, James B. Cheek
- Num. of stores: 101
- Floor area: 200,000 square feet (19,000 m^{2})
- Floors: 1
- Parking: 1,106
- Public transit: DART Bus Route 237
- Website: www.hpvillage.com
- Highland Park Shopping Village
- U.S. National Register of Historic Places
- U.S. National Historic Landmark
- Location within Texas Location within the United States
- Area: 10 acres (4.0 ha)
- Architectural style: Mission/Spanish Revival, Colonial Revival
- NRHP reference No.: 97001393

Significant dates
- Added to NRHP: November 17, 1997
- Designated NHL: February 16, 2000

Highland Park Village is an upscale shopping plaza located at the southwest corner of Mockingbird Lane and Preston Road in Highland Park, Texas and was the first self-contained shopping center in America. The Highland Park Village was declared a National Historic Landmark in 2000.

== History ==
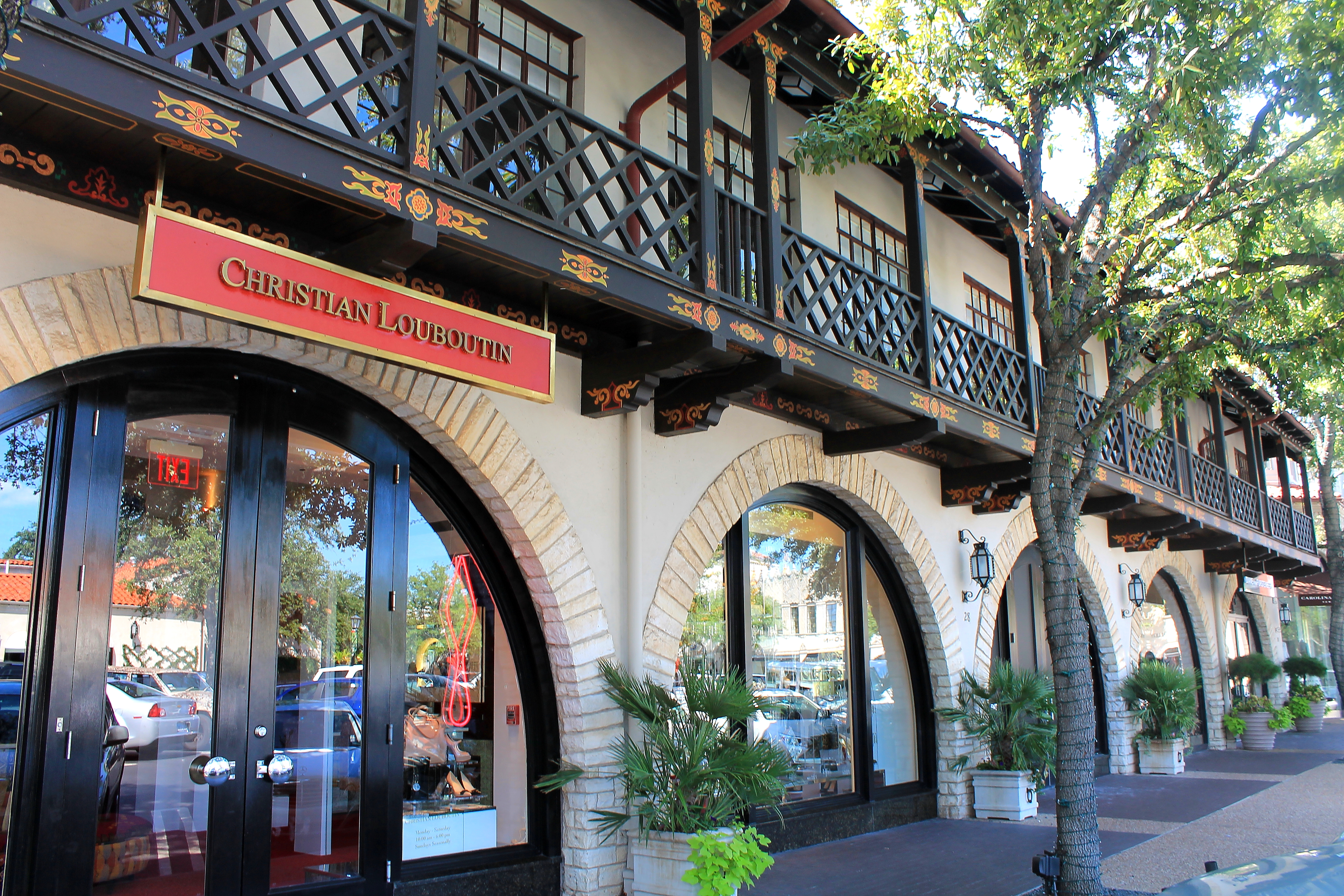
A view of the Highland Park Village

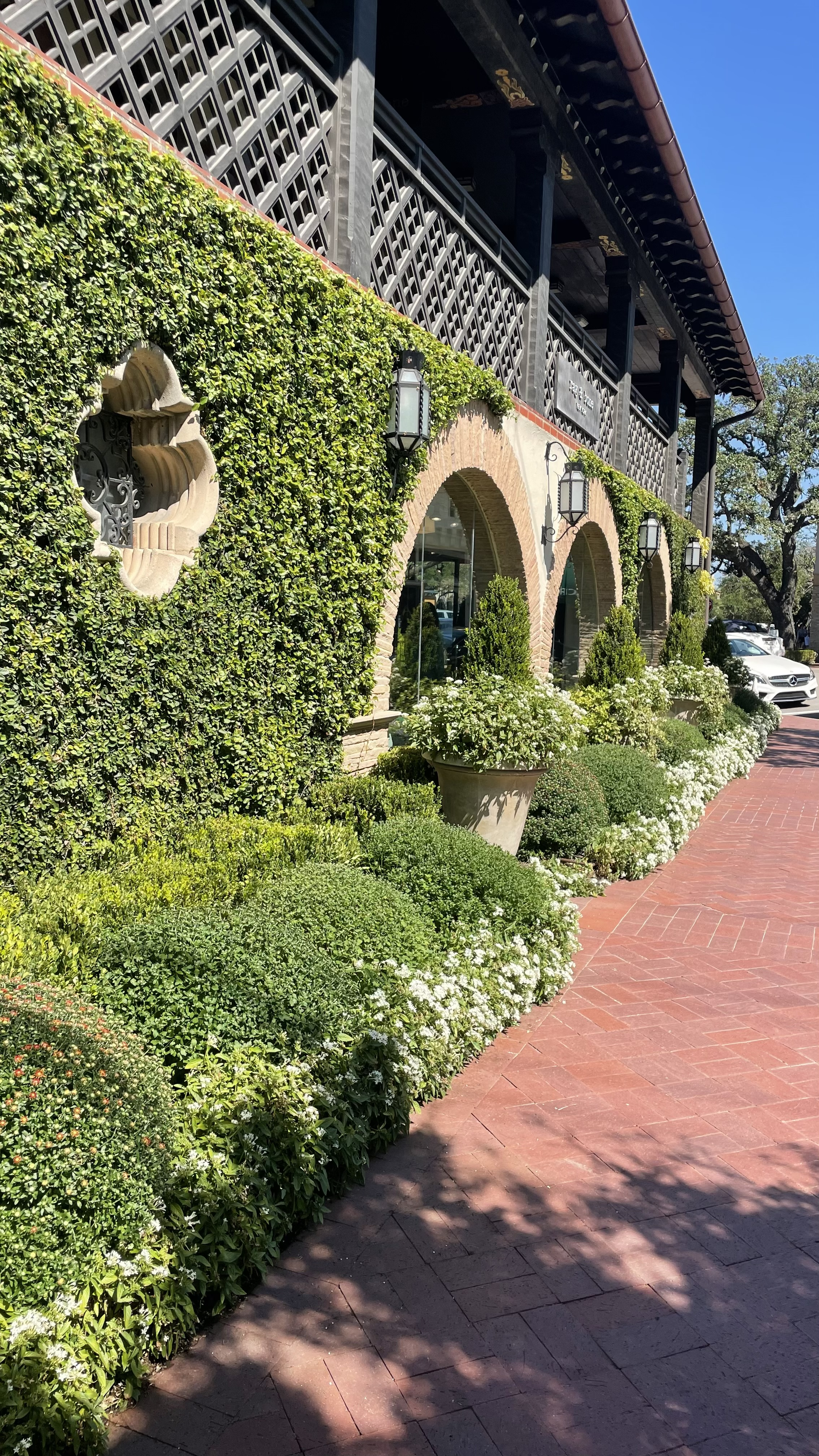
Highland Park Village in 2022

John S. Armstrong and his two sons-in-law, Edgar Flippen and Hugh Prather Sr., decided that Highland Park, Texas needed a shopping center that could function as a town square. The developers traveled to Barcelona and Seville in Spain as well as to Mexico and California, studying the architecture in order to plan a retail center for Highland Park.

They hired American architects Marion Fresenius Fooshee and James B. Cheek to design the center, which opened in 1931. After the death of Hugh Prather Sr. in 1959, management of the Village was taken over by his sons, John Prather and Hugh Prather Jr. In 1966, the Howard Corporation acquired the shopping center.

In 1976, the Howard Corporation decided to sell the Village and enlisted the help of the Henry S. Miller Company. Miller had a sentimental attachment to the property because his father had been an associate of the Flippen-Prather Realty Company from 1917 to 1919 and a close friend of both partners, Hugh Prather and Edgar Flippen.

Henry S. Miller and partners acquired the property in 1976 for $5 million and was developed by the Henry S. Miller Company, which later became Henry S. Miller Interests. Under Henry S. Miller.

On February 16, 2000, the shopping center was recognized as a National Historic Landmark and the center was placed on the National Register of Historic Places on November 17, 1997.

In 2009, Highland Park Village was purchased by Stephen Summers, Elisa Summers, Heather Washburne, and Ray Washburne, known as HP Village Partners, LP, for a record $170 million, the highest total price for a retail property of that year.

In 2013 Christian Dior, Tom Ford, Alexander McQueen, Brunello Cucinelli, Ermenegildo Zegna, James Perse, and Saint Laurent Paris opened at Highland Park Village.

== Retail Market Value ==
Currently the Village commands about $125 per square foot; placing it among the priciest retail locales in the state, although inexpensive relative to luxury retail areas in larger markets New York City, Los Angeles, and Chicago. Located near the wealthiest neighborhoods in the region, with Texas' first country club right next door, sales in Highland Park Village range from $1,000 per square foot to more than $1,500 annually.

== Amenities ==
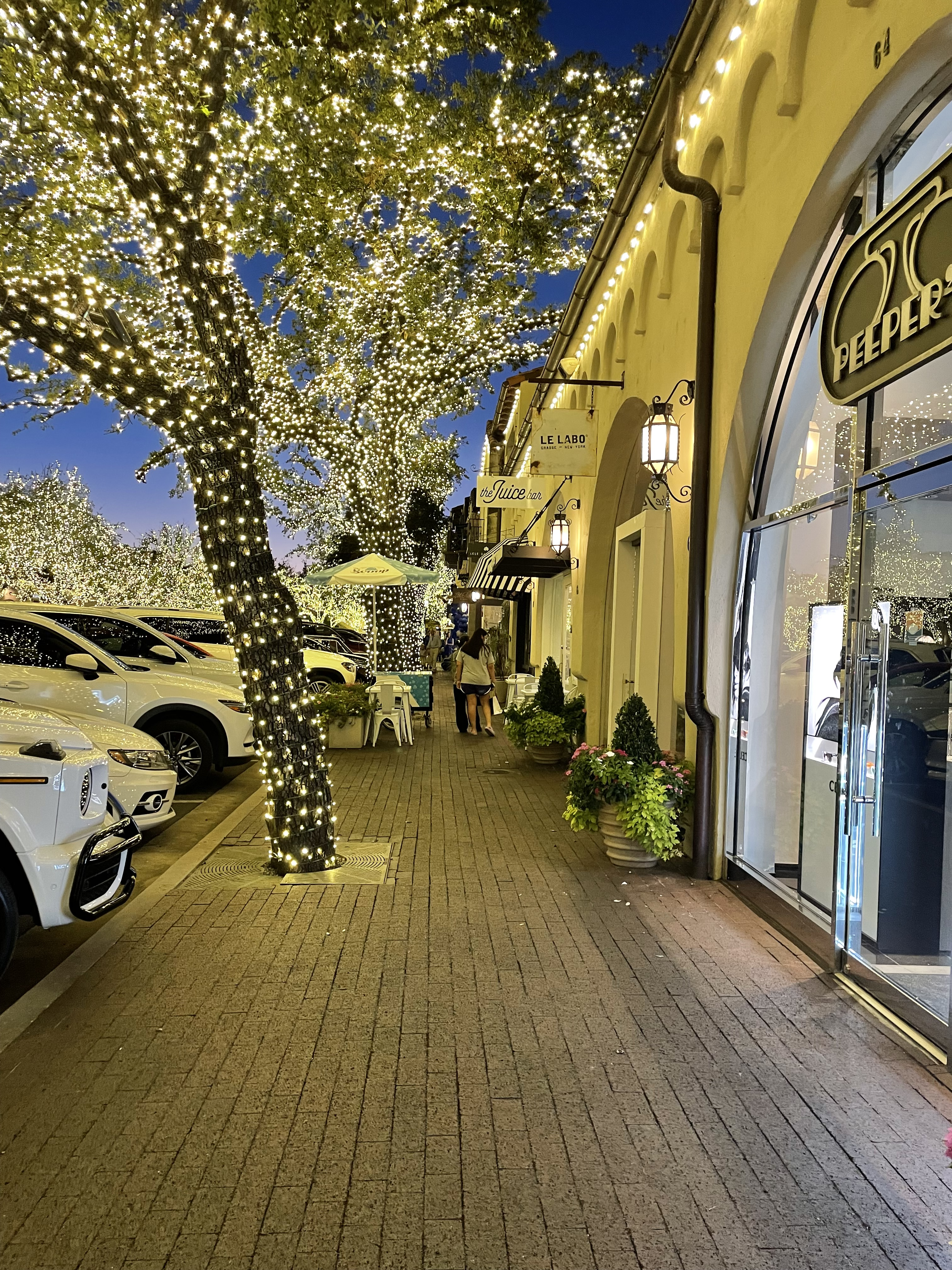
Highland Park Village at night

The Village Theatre, when it first opened in 1935 its construction cost more than $100,000. In 1979, the theater was renovated, with the balcony being converted into an additional screen. It was purchased by AMC Theatres in 1987, and the entire Art Deco interior was demolished, converting it into 11,000 square feet (1,000 m^{2}) of retail space, and two brand-new theater screens upstairs. It was once again renovated in 2010. The theater closed on March 16, 2020, and was used as retail space for Ralph Lauren until they relocated to Knox Street in 2025. The space is currently planned to be turned into an expanded Hermés store.
