= Bishop Hiram A. Boaz House =

Historic house in Arkansas, United States

- U.S. National Register of Historic Places
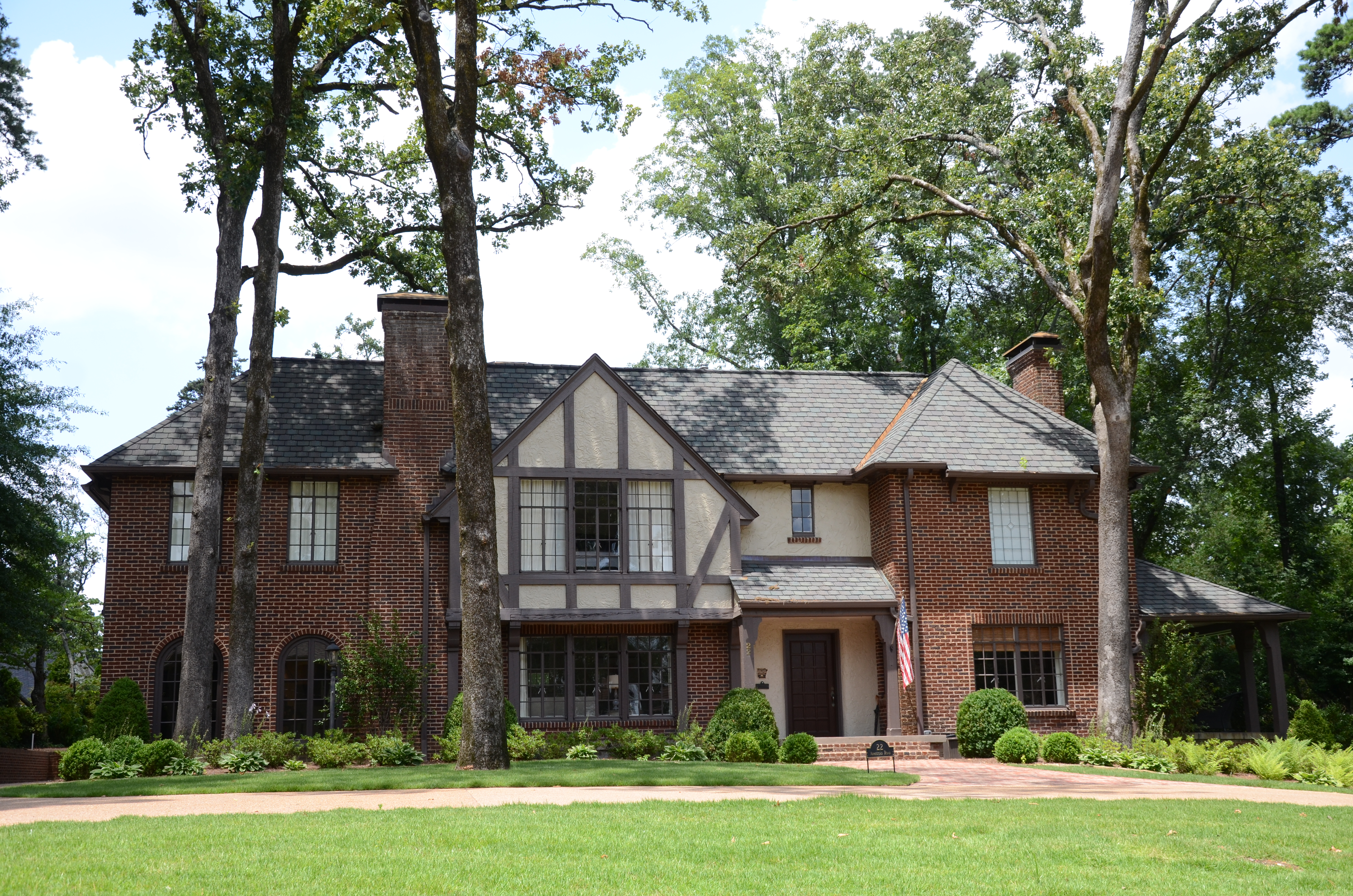

- Location within Arkansas Location within the United States
- Location: 22 Armistead Road, Little Rock, Arkansas
- Coordinates: 34°46′0″N 92°19′22″W
- Area: less than one acre
- Built: 1926
- Architect: Marion Fooshe, Charles L. Thompson
- Architectural style: Tudor Revival
- NRHP reference No.: 94000142
- Added to NRHP: March 7, 1994

The Bishop Hiram A. Boaz House is a historic house located at 22 Armistead Road in Little Rock, Arkansas.

== Description and history ==
It is a two-story, timber-framed structure, clad in brick and stucco with half-timbering in the Tudor Revival style. It was designed by Dallas, Texas architect Marion Fooshe under the supervision of the architect Charles L. Thompson, and was built in 1926 for Rev. Hiram A. Boaz, the first Methodist bishop to reside in Arkansas and the first president of Southern Methodist University. It was listed on the National Register of Historic Places on March 7, 1994, for its architecture and historic associations.
