= FEIT =

American shoe and accessories brand

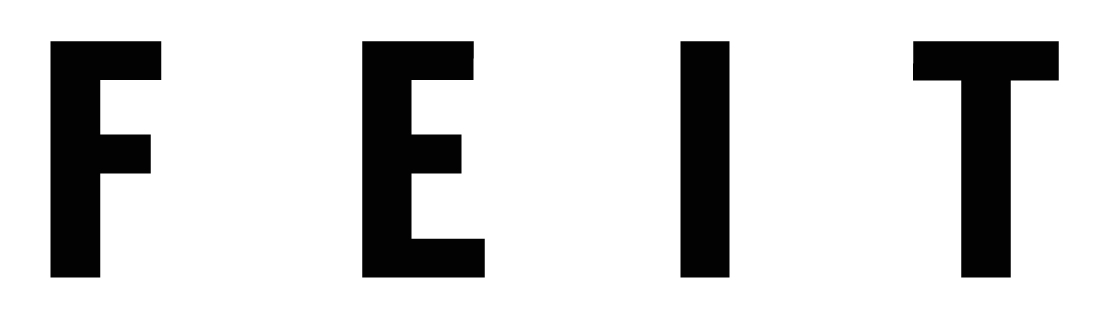
- Industry: Footwear
- Founded: 2005; 21 years ago
- Headquarters: New York City, US
- Key people: Tull and Josh Price (Founders)
- Website: www.feitdirect.com

FEIT (/faɪt/ FYTE) is a shoe and accessories brand based in New York City. Founded in 2005, it is owned and operated by brothers Tull and Josh Price. FEIT products are handmade using natural materials.

== History ==
Tull Price, the founder of FEIT, became interested in sneakers at an early age and founded Royal Elastics, as well as the footwear division of rag & bone. His brother Josh was a DJ in Australia at the time and became involved in Royal Elastics by hosting parties in New York and Sydney.

The brothers opened their first store in Sydney in 2006, and a second store in the Nolita area of New York in November 2014. Their second New York City store opened September 2015 in the West Village.

The brand has been based in NYC since 2015.

== Store design ==
FEIT's first New York City location is across the street from The New Museum and was designed by installation artist Jordana Maisie Goot. The 500-square foot store is built largely from matte-polyurethaned birch plywood, and has been featured in the design magazine Frame.

FEIT's second New York location opened in West Village in September 2015, also designed by Goot. According to an article published by The New York Times, the 420-square-foot space features "Large slabs of raw wood float inches apart, from floor to ceiling — with nooks carved out to display the products" and features "an intricate lighting system with white LED lights that allows the store to brighten and dim depending on the time of day and season". In an interview with Goot, Dezeen describes the construction as "similar to the process of shaping leather, the design team used moulds to carve out display shelves from blocks of timber during the 3D-modelling stage. The shelving components, made of Baltic birch plywood, were cut using a computer numerically controlled (CNC) machine. They were formed into modules and then delivered to the store."

== Construction ==
FEIT shoes are handmade, using biodegradable materials. They are hand-stitched without the use of machines to help reduce the amount of waste produced by the factory. Soles include an internal leather midsole, a layer of natural cork, a buffalo-leather outsole, a rubber shoe tread, and a leather strip which encases the sole to the upper. Shoes also include a bamboo shank, buffalo-leather insoles, leather welt, and cotton cording. FEIT shoes are primarily made using either Goodyear or stitchdown construction.

=== Biotrainer ===
First released in 2014, the "Bio-Trainer" is an all-natural handmade sneaker. Produced from vegetable-dyed suede and leather, the sneaker has a natural latex rubber sole.

== See also ==
- Slow fashion
