= No Man's Land, Illinois =

No Man's Land
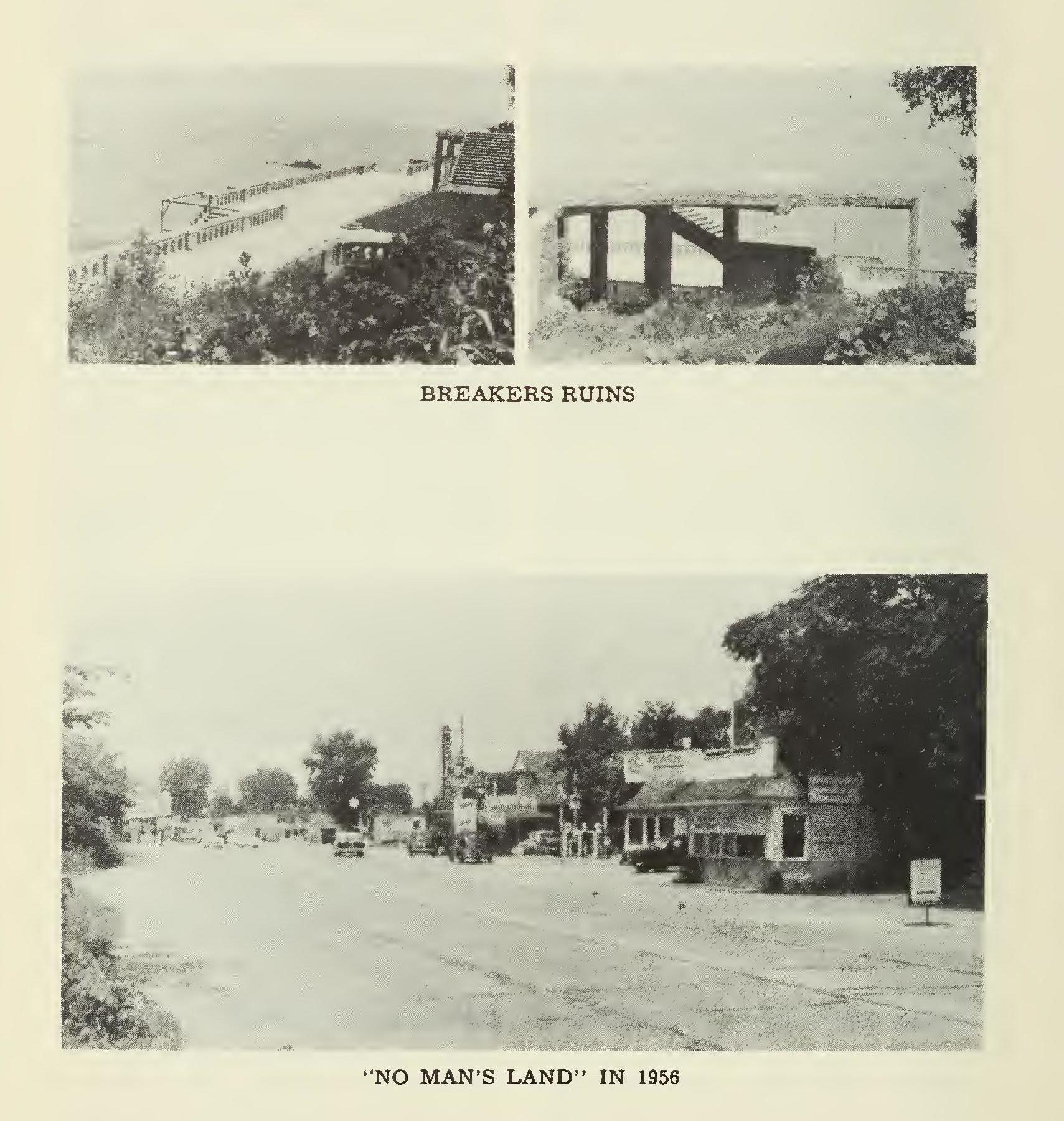

- Location of No Man's Land within Illinois No Man's Land (the United States)
- Coordinates: 42°04′38″N 87°43′25″W
- Country: United States
- State: Illinois
- Website: www.wilmette.com

No Man's Land, Illinois was never an official place name, but has been used to refer to at least two areas that fit the broader meaning of No man's land.

== Wilmette ==
Most commonly, the term was used to refer to a small unincorporated area north of Chicago on Sheridan Road, along the shore of Lake Michigan. It was bordered by the exclusive North Shore suburbs of Wilmette, on the south and west, and by Kenilworth on the north. Undeveloped for nearly a century after the first settlement of the area, no neighboring municipality wanted to annex it, and it became a haven for shady activities.

In the 1920s, a developer envisioned and began construction of a planned club and beach hotel complex to be called "Vista Del Lago" (Spanish for "Lakeview"). The club was actually built, in a Moorish Revival architectural style, on the west side of Sheridan Road, but the Great Depression prevented completion of the hotel. In 1928, one of the earlier automobile-oriented shopping centers, Spanish Court, opened adjacent to the club.

The lack of development on the east side of the road, coupled with the club's location in a relatively lawless unincorporated area, led to a state legislator in the 1930s terming No Man's Land "a slot machine and keno sin center where college students were being debauched with beer, hard liquor and firecrackers." In 1942, after decades of disputed ownership and legal wrangling, the area was annexed by the village of Wilmette. The club burned down shortly thereafter. The area is now the home of the Plaza del Lago shopping center on the west side of Sheridan Road and a small number of anomalous high-rise residential buildings east of Sheridan.

Prior to the redevelopment of the area in the 60's, such establishments as firework stores, hot dog stands, ice cream shops, car dealerships, and service stations had earned the area nicknames of 'Coney Island of the North Shore' and 'honkey-tonk town of the North Shore'.

=== Natives ===
Actor Charlton Heston was born in the Wilmette-adjacent No Man's Land while his family was living in the area.

== Rogers Park ==
The term, according to one author, was used prior to the expansion of Evanston and Chicago to refer to what is now the Rogers Park neighborhood of Chicago. It is also identified by the United States Geological Survey as being a variant name of the Howard District, located at 42°1′15″N 87°40′9″W.

== See also ==
- Plaza del Lago
- From No Man's Land to Plaza del Lago
