= Edwin Hill Clark =

American architect (1878-1967)

Edwin Hill Clark (April 1878 – January 1967) was a Chicago architect best known for designing public buildings and private residences. His buildings, many of which are located along Chicago's North Shore, reflect a wide range of styles from English Tudor to Mediterranean and Spanish. Among his best known works is the Brookfield Zoo in Brookfield, Illinois, which was the first zoo in the United States to display animals in simulated natural environments rather than behind bars. He is also known for his work on the Thorne Rooms, commissioned by Narcissa Niblack Thorne, which are on permanent display at the Art Institute of Chicago.

== Early life ==
Edwin was the youngest of four children born to a well-to-do Chicago family. His father, raised on a poor Vermont farm, became a very successful commodities broker after the Civil War. In 1889 his father quit the commodities business and took the family to live in Europe for two years. When the family returned to the United States, his father purchased the Chicago branch of the Wadsworth Holland paint company. Expecting to enter the family business, after graduating from Phillips Andover Academy Edwin went on to major in chemistry at Yale in preparation to becoming the company's technical expert.

Clark was a talented musician (allegedly the first person in Chicago to play the saxophone) and sculptor. His brother, Alson Skinner Clark, was an early American impressionist and went on to be one of the founders of the "California School" of en plein aire painters.

== Architectural work ==
Edwin only stayed with the paint company for three years before leaving to study drafting at the Armour Institute (now the Illinois Institute of Technology) while he was recovering from an illness (which may have resulted from lead poisoning). He then joined the architectural firm of William A. Otis, a highly successful Winnetka-based architect. In 1908 Otis made him a junior partner, and the partnership lasted until 1920 when Clark established his own architectural firm in an office at 8 East Huron Street in Chicago.

He continued to practice until his wife, Katharine Bayley, died in 1946. He then turned his firm over to two of his associates and limited his activities to working with his old clients and other small jobs. During his career he was associated with a number of different architects and was known for the support and help he provided young architects starting out in the profession. For instance, he hired one of the country's first woman architects, Juliet Peddle, who spent four years with him learning the practical aspects of operating an architectural business.

Clark's architecture has been described as eclectic, imaginative, traditional, solid, and practical. His buildings reflected a wide range of styles from English Tudor to Mediterranean and Spanish. He designed his buildings to work well for their owners and to last—demolishing one of his buildings has often turned out to be very expensive. He is mainly remembered for his residential buildings, public buildings, schools, zoo designs, and for the Thorne rooms. He also designed some commercial buildings.

=== Residences ===
He designed numerous luxurious residences, primarily in Winnetka and Lake Forest, Illinois. However, his most palatial residences were Montejoli, an estate with a 10,000-square-foot (930 m^{2}) mansion, that he designed for the James Ward Thorne family (Montgomery Ward heirs) overlooking the Pacific Ocean in Santa Barbara, California, and Knollwood, a 15,000-square-foot (1,400 m^{2}) mansion designed for Marjorie Montgomery Ward in Oconomowoc, Wisconsin. As an example of his practical innovative design, he designed some of the first houses with zoned heating in order to reduce heating costs.

=== Public buildings ===
Aside from his zoos, his best known public buildings are the Winnetka Village Hall and the Lake Forest Library. However, other examples include the Waveland Field House, headquarter offices (now the Cultural Center), and Woolford Tower in Lincoln Park, the Hinsdale Memorial Building, the Chicago Tuberculosis Sanatorium, a tuberculosis preventorium near Lake Forest, and an Eleanor residential hotel for women in Chicago. During the First World War he was responsible for designing and overseeing the substantial expansion of the Great Lakes Naval Station.

=== Schools ===
He designed buildings for several schools in Chicago and along the North Shore. These include the Latin School of Chicago, the North Shore Country Day School, Ferry Hall School (now merged with Lake Forest Academy), and the Greeley school in Winnetka. All are still in operation. The Greeley School (designed while he was a partner with William Otis) was innovative in terms of being designed so that it could be easily expanded (which has occurred several times) and is now the oldest public school in Winnetka.

=== Zoos ===
His major zoo project was the Brookfield Zoo, operated by the Chicago Zoological Society in the suburb of Brookfield. This was the first zoo in the United States to display animals in simulated natural environments rather than behind bars. He traveled to Europe and studied a number of zoos there to gain inspiration and study the practical aspects of this innovative design approach (for instance how deep the moats had to be and what slope had to be applied to the floors of the enclosures to keep the animals from leaping out). He also designed buildings at the National Zoological Park in Washington, DC, and at the Lincoln Park Zoo in Chicago.

=== Commercial buildings ===
He did not design many commercial buildings, but one of his most successful projects was the Spanish Court, now called the Plaza del Lago, on the north side of Wilmette, Illinois. This was the second shopping center built in the United States designed for cars, with the shops clustered around compact parking areas. It included an ornate classic movie theater that could seat 1,300 people, with a large organ to accompany silent films. This theater has since been demolished, but the rest of the plaza has been refurbished and continues to be successful.

=== The Thorne Rooms ===
He was at loose ends during the 1930s because of the severe downturn in housing and other construction. During this period, Narcissa Niblack Thorne hired him to design some of the original Thorne box rooms, a collection of 68 miniature rooms reflecting a wide range of different architectural styles, that are now on display at the Art Institute of Chicago and several other locations. The rooms and all of their contents were meticulously designed and built at a scale of one inch to one foot.

== Death and afterward ==
Clark died in 1967 at the age of 89. He was remembered for his sense of humor and his quiet, reserved kindness.
