= Tull Price =

Australian businessman (born 1976)

Tull Price (born 8 March 1976) is a footwear designer, entrepreneur, and business owner.

== Early life ==
Tull Price grew up between Israel and Australia, spending his teen years organising parties and club nights in Sydney. Since 1995, he has also spent time in New York, London, Amsterdam, and Los Angeles. He has lived in New York City for about 20 years.

He lives in Brooklyn, New York with his wife, fashion stylist Natasha Shick, and their two children.

== Royal Elastics ==
Tull founded Royal Elastics in Australia with his business partner Rodney Adler in 1996 when he was only twenty years old. Inspired by the skateboard trends of the 1990s, the brand is known for its sneakers which fasten with velcro and elasticated cord instead of laces.

Started with only $5,000, the brand gained traction very quickly. By 1999 they were selling close to 1 million pairs a year and were available in 35 countries around the world, including ten of their own stores in Asia and one in the United States.

They sold the company to K-Swiss in November 2001 for an undisclosed amount. Tull relocated from Sydney, Australia to K-Swiss headquarters at Westlake Village, California in 2001 to serve as President of the company and left the following year.

== FEIT ==
Towards the end of his time at Royal Elastics, Tull became dissatisfied with the direction the product was heading. "It had become about sales volume, quarterly profits and no longer about quality product." After leaving Royal, Tull took the next two years to travel around Europe in search of traditional cobblers to teach him old school shoemaking techniques. Upon returning to NYC in 2004 with a better understanding of what makes a high quality pair of shoes, Tull enlisted his brother, Josh Price, to help found FEIT in 2005.

FEIT was founded as a response to "fast fashion" and is one of the founders of the neo-luxury movement.

The opposite of mass-production, all FEIT shoes are made entirely by hand and signed by the craftsman who made it. Old world techniques and constructions are used, such as the Handsewn Goodyear Welt and Stitchdown constructions.

FEIT has two stores in New York City and one in Sydney, Australia.

== Rag & Bone ==
Tull met Marcus Wainwright in 2001 when he was working for Royal Elastics. Marcus started Rag & Bone in 2003, and in 2008 they contacted Tull to discuss the possibility of bringing footwear into their then-growing company. They partnered to found the footwear division of Rag & Bone in the spring of 2009. Tull still serves as President and Creative Director of Footwear at Rag & Bone. The Rag & Bone "Newbury" boot, designed in 2011, remains one of the best sellers for the brand.
