= Juanita Miller =

Juanita Miller (1912–2005), patron of the arts in Dallas, Texas, played a formative role in saving the Dallas Symphony Orchestra from collapse in the 1970s and promoting the city’s cultural institutions. Since the arts in Dallas received meager funding from the government at this time, private fundraisers like Juanita Miller sustained institutions such as the DSO.

== Biography ==
After attending the University of Oklahoma, she decided to be an educator teaching at the high school and college level. Meeting her husband, Henry S. Miller, Jr. (who later ran the successful Henry S. Miller Company) at a return center for World War II veterans in 1945, she stayed married until her death. Including her role as wife and mother of four, Juanita Miller championed the arts in Dallas beginning in the fifties.

== J. Miller and the DSO ==
Juanita Miller's money generating abilities were indispensable to the Dallas arts scene because of the lack of government funding. During the 1970s, Senator Ron Clower acknowledged that Texas ranked "53rd of the 55 states and territories in the amount per capita that the [government] spends on the arts". Local organizations, such as the Chamber of Commerce, acknowledged that "the Dallas Symphony Orchestra has been a positive influence in the cultural and civic life of the city since 1900". Furthermore, it was agreed by city planners that "no city of comparable size and influence in the United States… [during the 1970s was] without an established symphony orchestra or society". Conscious of the importance of the Dallas Symphony Orchestra, faced with serious financial difficulties and on the verge of complete collapse, Miller began to take action.

Miller communicated personally with unpaid musicians frustrated with cancelled shows. She worked relentlessly behind the scenes contacting Texas representatives and senators to generate funding for the symphony while organizing social activities such as balls to generate awareness and funds. In terms of her social activities, balls were seen as a way "to get coverage, make people aware of the symphony, the opera, and the theatre". In the same article, points out that many people "don't realize that in Dallas many organizations are absolutely supported by women". In the Dallas arts scene, Balls organized by women such as Juanita Miller, were "strictly fiscal and necessary [as] money-raising projects". Miller was so fiscally successful, in fact, other philanthropic associations sought out her help. In a letter from the Vice President from the Susan G. Komen for the Cure Foundation during the 1980s, Mrs. Miller was asked to become involved "in the money management aspect of the Foundation as well as the money raising".

== Awards ==
Among her many accolades are the James K. Wilson Award (1986) and the "Woman of the Year" award from Les Femmes du Monde (1999). She founded the Texas Women's Association for Symphony Orchestras, which still exists as a functioning body today as the Texas Association for Symphony Orchestras.
