= Hugh Prather =

American writer (1938–2010)

Hugh Edmondson Prather III (January 23, 1938 – November 15, 2010) was an American self-help writer, lay minister, and counselor, most famous for his first book, Notes to Myself, which was first published in 1970 by Real People Press, and later reprinted by Bantam Books. It has sold over 5 million copies, and has been translated into ten languages.

== Family, early life, and education ==
Hugh Prather's father, Hugh Prather Jr., grandfather, Hugh Prather Sr., and great-grandfather, John S. Armstrong, contributed to the growth of the city of Dallas, Texas. Prather Sr., Armstrong, and Armstrong's other son-in-law, Edgar Flippen, helped plan and build the town of Highland Park, which is now part of the enclave Park Cities surrounded by the city of Dallas. In 1931, Flippen and Prather Sr. developed Highland Park Village, the first planned shopping center in the United States. Hugh Prather Jr., ran the shopping center after his father's death.

Hugh Prather III was born in Dallas and earned a bachelor's degree at Southern Methodist University in 1966 after study at Principia College and Columbia University. He studied at the University of Texas at the graduate level without taking a degree.

== Career ==
While he could be categorized as a New Age writer, Prather drew on Christian language and themes and seemed comfortable conceiving of God in personal terms. His work underscored the importance of gentleness, forgiveness, and loyalty; declined to endorse dramatic claims about the power of the individual mind to effect unilateral transformations of external material circumstances; and stressed the need for the mind to let go of destructive cognitions in a manner not unlike that encouraged by the cognitive-behavioral therapy of Aaron T. Beck and the rational emotive behavior therapy commended by Albert Ellis.

His first book, Notes to Myself: My Struggle to Become a Person, began as a journal that he impulsively submitted to a publisher. The book became "a phenomenon" of the 1970s, according to The New York Times, and as of 2010 it remained in print. Prather's dog Moosewood was named in the book and inspired the name of the Moosewood Restaurant. The book was later parodied by humorist Jack Handey with his "Deep Thoughts".

Together with his second wife, Gayle Prather, whom he married in 1965, he wrote The Little Book of Letting Go, I Touch the Earth, The Earth Touches Me, How to Live in the World and Still Be Happy, I Will Never Leave You: How Couples Can Achieve The Power Of Lasting Love, Spiritual Notes to Myself: Essential Wisdom for the 21st Century, Shining Through: Switch on Your Life and Ground Yourself in Happiness, Spiritual Parenting: A Guide to Understanding and Nurturing the Heart of Your Child, Standing on My Head: Life Lessons in Contradictions, A Book of Games: A Course in Spiritual Play, Love and Courage, Notes to Each Other, A Book for Couples, The Quiet Answer, and There is a Place Where You Are Not Alone.

In 2018, a librarian in Cincinnati, Ohio, Sheryl Pockrose, discovered that master cassettes of three years of Prather's lectures from the Dispensable Church in Santa Fe, given 1981–1983, still existed, and had been saved for many years by one of the original deacons of the church, Jonathan Huntress. With the approval of Gayle Prather, these talks are being digitized by Stellar Platforms and made available for free listening at https://dispensablechurch.wordpress.com/

== Death ==
Prather died on November 15, 2010, in the hot tub of his Tucson, Arizona home, apparently of a heart attack. He is survived by his immediate family - wife Gayle Prather, and their two sons, John and Jordan - and his siblings Alan A. Prather, Joan Prather, and Jeffrey P. Prather. Hugh also had an older son from a previous marriage, Perry Scott Prather who died on March 1, 2016.
