= Henry S. Miller Company =

Henry S. Miller Company is one of the largest independent brokerage and property management firms in the Dallas-Fort Worth, Texas area. Founded in 1914, the business and the metroplex seemed to grow together. In a 1999 editorial naming the leading 20 Dallasites of the 20th Century, Henry S. Miller was called "the master of real estate brokerage."

The company was founded by Henry S. Miller, Sr., who had worked in retail and real estate prior to venturing out on his own. The one-man business had offices in the Southland Life Insurance Building in downtown Dallas. In the 1930s, Henry S. Miller, Jr. joined the business and helped it diversify into insurance. The father and son formed an official partnership during World War II.

In 1960, the company was incorporated and continued growing. Henry S. Miller, Jr. was named its chairman and chief executive officer. He is credited with providing the leadership for the company's continued diversification. The portfolio of services included property-management, office and shopping center leasing, as well as industrial property leasing. In 1961 and 1962, the company posted record-breaking sales. In 1961 alone, its sales were more than $15 million. Vance C. Miller, Henry Jr's son, joined the firm in 1959 and became president in 1970, Vance is credited in large part for growing the company to national prominence. Vance encouraged Henry Jr to pursue the purchase of Highland Park Village in 1977.

From 1970 until 1977, Roger Staubach, then the quarterback of the Dallas Cowboys, worked for the company in the off-season. (He went on to a career in commercial real estate after his retirement from sports.)

Example projects included high-profile properties such as Highland Park Village (1977), Preston Royal (1958), and later West Village (2001) by Henry's son Henry S. Miller III. Clients included a wide variety of professional and retail firms such as Target stores, Blockbuster Video, Boston Market Wyatt's Cafeterias. and many more. The company also provided services free of charge to non-profit agencies in the Dallas area including the Red Cross, the YMCA, and the Scottish Rite Hospital for Crippled Children. Additionally, the family was active in many other civic projects. The Dallas Morning News's Rena Pederson described Henry and Juanita Miller as "stalwart" patrons of the arts in the community. Without their stewardship, there would not have been a Dallas Opera."

The company merged with Grubb & Ellis in 1984 for a reported $40 million and operated as Henry S. Miller/Grubb & Ellis until the early 1990s. In 1991 Grubb & Ellis dropped the Miller name and Vance Miller bought it back via the purchase of Henry S. Miller Co., Realtors. The company then operated as a residential brokerage and had 26 offices in cities in Texas including Austin and Houston. Vance's son Vaughn Miller who had joined his father in 1986 at Vance C. Miller Interests, moved to Henry S. Miller/Grubb & Ellis in 1989, then joined Henry S. Miller Co Realtors in 1993 as President of the Commercial/Retail Division. Vaughn grew the Commercial operation to 13 brokers and in March 1994 merged with two other area firms. Henry S. Miller Commercial Co. was launched as a full service real estate company. Vaughn Miller headed the Retail Division of the company from 1993 to 2013 and was responsible for the brokerage of several major Dallas corners including Central Expressway and Royal Lane, Central Expressway and Forest Lane and Inwood Road and Forest Lane. The firm also had a significant base in the residential real estate market. Vance and Vaughn Miller are largely credited as rebuilding the Henry S. Miller in commercial real estate in the 1990s. By 1996, it was the second largest Texas firm, after Ebby Halliday Realtors, and was ranked 29th in the nation by a Real Trends survey, based on its 1995 home sales transactions. It is the largest independent real estate brokerage services firm in Texas.

"My wonderful family has taken over the legacy that my father began the year I was born," said Henry S. Miller, Jr. in a 2005 interview with The Dallas Morning News "The established goal for them, as it was for me, is to continue the Henry S. Miller legacy for generations to come with the level of integrity on which it was founded. I carried the legacy to the best of my ability, and now it is their turn. It's not an unfinished goal but an infinite goal."

Vance Miller, Henry S. Miller Jr.'s son, succeeded his father as chairman and chief executive of the Henry S. Miller Co. His grandpa founded a real estate company in 1914, and he spent 50 years expanding it.

Vance graduated from Highland Park High School and earned a B.B.A. from Southern Methodist University in 1956 after meeting his wife there, Geraldine “Tincy” Erwin. He was especially proud of his service as a lieutenant in the Air Force as a jet fighter pilot during the “Cold War” years and briefly considered pursuing a career in the military. Instead, he remained in the U.S. Air Force Reserves for several years and joined his father and grandfather in the family business. He joined the business in 1959, became president in 1970, and along with his father, grew the company to become one of the pre-eminent regional real estate powerhouses in Texas and the US.

Vance and Tincy's son Greg Miller assumed the role of chief executive officer and president of Henry S. Miller Cos. after Vance's passing in February 2013 as Mrs. Geraldine "Tincy" Miller moved into the position as chair. Vaughn Miller followed his father's path and formed his own development company, VCM Development Group.

Greg Miller has been with the Henry S. Miller Cos. for more than ten years. Prior to joining the family business, he practiced real estate law for eight years at the firm of Geary, Porter and Donovan, P.C. Greg has extensive working experience involving the acquisition, financing, development, lease and disposition of millions of commercial real estate square feet.
