= K-Swiss =

American footwear company

K-Swiss, Inc.
- Type: Privately held
- Industry: Sportswear, footwear
- Founded: 1966; 60 years ago
- Founders: Art Brunner; Ernie Brunner
- Headquarters: Los Angeles, California; (1966–2024); Glendale, California; (since 2024)
- Area served: Worldwide
- Products: Footwear, sportswear
- Parent: KP Global
- Website: www.kswiss.com

K-Swiss, Inc., is an American athletic shoe brand based in Glendale, California, founded in 1966.

== History ==
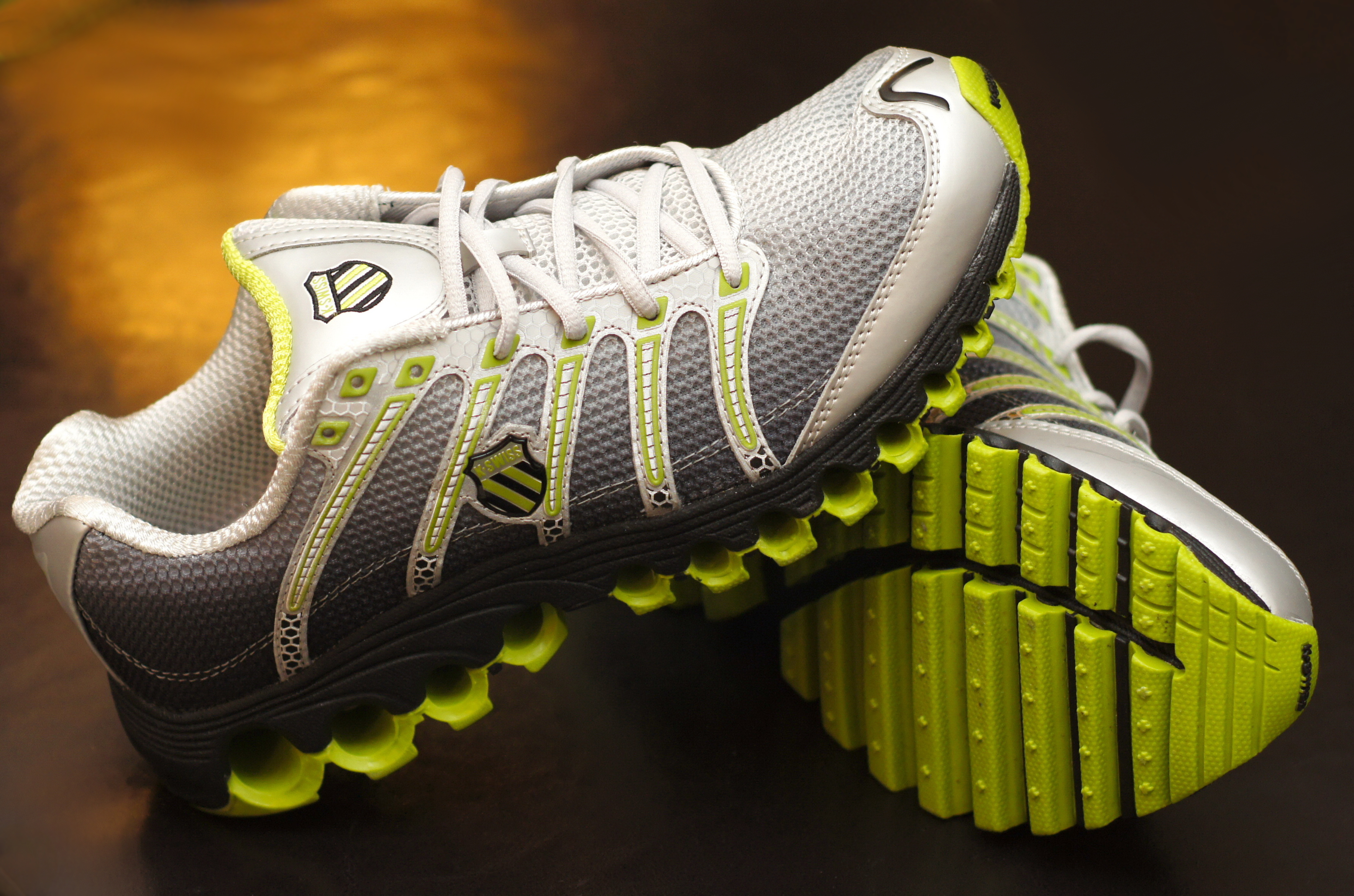
K-Swiss Tubes running shoes

K-Swiss was founded in 1966 in Los Angeles by Swiss brothers Art and Ernie Brunner. They became interested in tennis after emigrating to the United States. They imported leather tennis shoes from the Swiss shoe manufacturer Kuenzli. K-Swiss is the pairing of "K" in Kuenzli and "Swiss". For two decades, the company only made white tennis shoes. In 1987, a group of investors acquired the company in a leveraged buyout.

K-Swiss purchased a majority stake in the Australian brand Royal Elastics in 2001. It sold Royal Elastics to a management-led investment group in 2009, recording a $1.4 million gain in the second quarter.

In January 2013, the company was sold to Korean firm E-Land World Limited for $170 million. The following May, E-Land named a new executive team to oversee the newly formed K-Swiss Inc., including Truman Kim as chairman and Larry Remington as president and CEO.

On June 1, 2015, K-Swiss acquired Supra Footwear. It moved its headquarters from Westlake Village to Downtown Los Angeles in 2016.

In August 2019, E-Land Footwear USA Holdings Inc., the parent company of K-Swiss, was acquired by Xtep International Holdings Limited, a Chinese sports equipment manufacturer. In 2024, K-Swiss was sold and privatized under KP Global for $151 million, and moved its headquarters to Glendale, California.

== Marketing ==
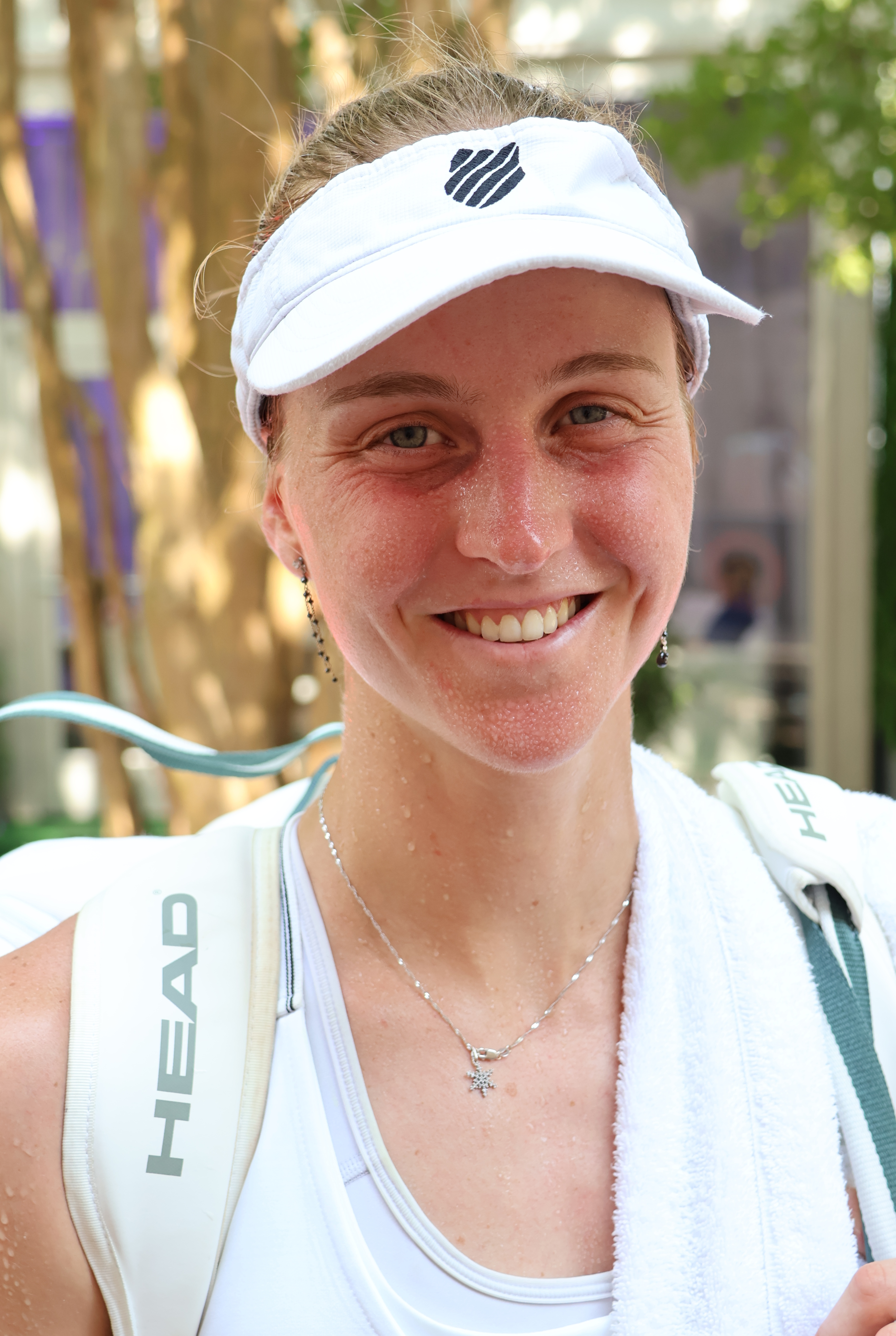
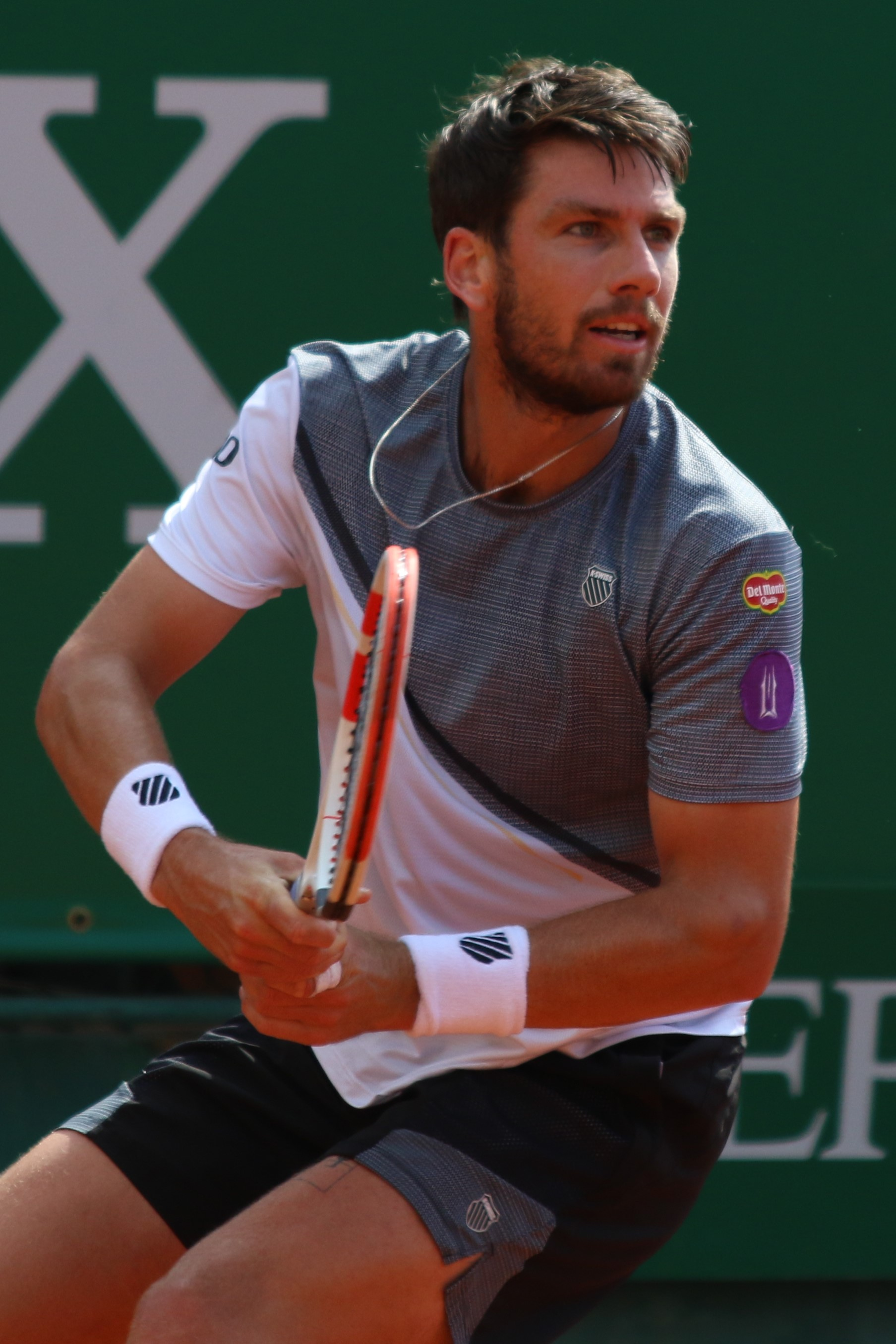
K-Swiss has signed professional tennis players Liudmila Samsonova and Cameron Norrie (both pictured in 2023).

In the 1990s, Steven Nichols boosted K-Swiss's marketing budget, and hired a number of key individuals from large companies, such as Procter & Gamble. Award-winning Creative Director Mindy Gale led her NY based agency team in developing and producing K-Swiss advertising and publicity campaigns from 1997 until 2008. The "I Wear My K-Swiss" multi-media campaign ran for five consecutive years, targeting young urban consumers in print and on TV.

A re-branding campaign featuring Anna Kournikova rolled out in 2007. A 2011 advertisement, featuring Danny McBride as fictional character Kenny Powers, drew attention for its use of profanity.

In September 2014, the company unveiled a new marque. The new identity was created by a recently appointed internal creative team and plays up the company's heritage as an American tennis brand. All aspects of the new brand's design, including its 1966 typeface and tennis court color palette, hark back to this identity. The company has been sponsoring events that appeal to their market as well as events which are likely to shape buying attitudes and help generate a positive reaction. One example is the sponsorship of Ireland's first sneaker convention run by Dub City Sneakz in Dún Laoghaire which K-Swiss sponsored.

In 2016, K-Swiss president Barney Waters made it the brand's mission to "make sneakers for entrepreneurs." The brand furthered this marketing angle by launching a collaboration with entrepreneur Gary Vaynerchuk in 2017. The company has since launched campaigns with other entrepreneurs, including Karen Civil, Ben Baller, and Natalie Ellis.

In 2019, K-Swiss debuted a shoe collaboration with TV series Breaking Bad. Venus Williams was named a brand ambassador in 2021.

In 2026, K-Swiss announced a three-year footwear partnership with the ATP to start in 2027. As part of the deal, the company will introduce the ATP Baseline program, which will provide shoes to the top 250 players without a current footwear sponsor.
