= Marion Fresenius Fooshee =

American architect

- Born: July 27, 1888
- Died: January 4, 1956 (aged 67)

Marion Fresenius Fooshee (July 27, 1888 – January 4, 1956) was an American architect active in the Dallas, Texas (USA) area.

The architect's name has also been spelled as Marion Fooshe.

Marion Fooshee was Francis Marion and Margaret Christine (Fresenius) Fooshee's only child. Marion was born in Weatherford, Texas and spent his early years in Corpus Christi, Texas. At age seven, Marion's father died while the family was living in Corpus Christi. In 1898 he and his mother moved north to Dallas, where his mother established a boarding house at Live Oak Street and Haskell Avenue, in the current Bryan Place neighborhood. Fooshee spent the remainder of his youth there and attended Bryan High School, but did not go to college.

In 1911, Marion Fooshee was hired by H. B. Thompson to help design eclectic homes for the Dallas elite. Much of his designs are seen on Swiss Avenue and in the Munger Place historic district in east Dallas. Some of his important designs include the Aldredge House at 5500 Swiss Avenue, built in 1917, and homes for Charles Sanger and Judge George C. Greer.

Fooshee was a tall Southern gentleman who was friendly and easygoing—his demeanor fitted Thompson's clientele very well, and several projects, including the palatial Orville Throp residence in Highland Park, 4908 Lakeside, built 1915, are generally credited to Thompson and Fooshee.

At the outbreak of World War I, Fooshee entered officers' training camp and was sent to the Bethlehem Ship Yards in San Francisco where he performed architectural work for the Navy. In 1918 he was discharged and he began an independent architectural practice in Dallas. James B. Cheek, who Fooshee met in Thompson's office around 1914, joined Fooshee's practice soon after. In one point, the practice was apparently located in Wichita Falls.

In Dallas, Fooshee and Cheek solidified their reputation for designing large homes for the very wealthy. They typically worked independently on their residential commissions; Fooshee is credited with 3606 Cornell in Highland Park (ca. 1923). They also built apartment buildings and duplexes, including much of the 4400 block of Westway in Dallas, where both Fooshee and Cheek lived.

In 1920, Fooshee was appointed architect for the Dallas Park Board, and the firm's practice expanded into civic and commercial structures. Among the projects built were Highland Park Village (ca. 1930–1935), the first self-contained shopping center in the nation, though the project is generally credited to Cheek.

Fooshee and Cheek was one of eleven architectural firms involved in the construction and design of the Hall of State at the Texas Centennial Exposition in Fair Park. They were also involved in the designing of the aquarium, and Cheek designed the United States Federal Exhibits Building. They also designed many gas stations, motels, and several of the state's first radio and television stations. Fooshee is credited with designing the Grand Court Tourisst Lodge in 1931 and a Magnolia Service Station in Dallas. His firm was noted for their Spanish Colonial designs. Also, mausoleums were considered a specialty of the firm.

In June 1927, Fooshee married Annie Linda Atkins of St. Louis. The two had a daughter, but Annie died in 1931. Fooshee then married Peggy Montague Neale in June 1940, and the two also had a daughter. Fooshee was a member of the Dallas Country Club and president of the Idlewild Club. He also helped organize St. Michael and All Angels Episcopal Church and designed its first building. He was also a member of the Dallas City Plan Commission, the American Institute of Architects, the Junior Chamber of Commerce, and he played a key role in an attempt to remodel the historic Union Station in Dallas. Fooshee continued in his architectural practice until he suffered a heart attack and died on 4 January 1956. He is buried in Hillcrest Memorial Park in Dallas, the site of his first noted mausoleum.
