= Royal Elastics =

- Industry: Footwear
- Founded: 1996; 30 years ago
- Founders: Rodney Adler; Tull Price
- Parent: K-Swiss (2001–2009)
- Website: www.royalelastics.com

Royal Elastics is a brand of athletic and leisure shoes that fastens with velcro and elasticated cord instead of laces.

== History ==
The company was founded in 1996 by Australians Rodney Adler and Tull Price. They realised there was no need for laces in sneakers, and produced shoes fastened using velcro or elasticated cord. It was acquired by American footwear company, K-Swiss in 2001 for an undisclosed amount in an effort to expand its share of the athletic and leisure shoe market. The founders relocated to K-Swiss headquarters at Westlake Village, California. Tull Price left the company in 2002 and went on to form FEIT in 2005.

The brand has collaborated with various artists, such as Gwen Stefani for her L.A.M.B series in 2005.

By 2008, the company had 10 stores in Asia and opened its first store in the United States. K-Swiss later sold Royal Elastics to a management led investment group in 2009, recording a gain of $1.4 million in the second quarter.

Till 2016, Royal Elastics has owned nearly a hundred of physical and on-line stores in Japan, Asia pacific, Australia and North America territories. Royal Elastics also runs an online store that offers worldwide shipping.
