= Buck Mason =

American men's clothing brand

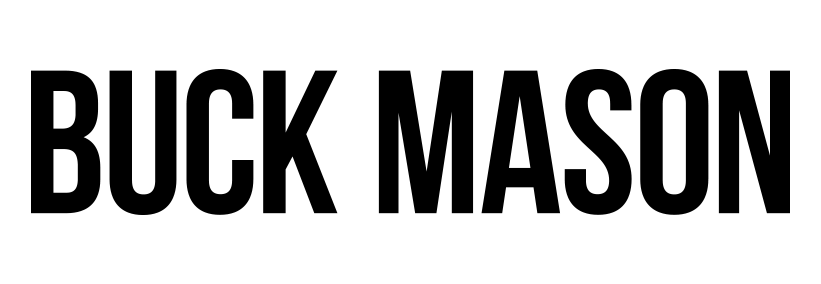
- Type: Private
- Industry: Retail, e-commerce
- Founded: 2013
- Founders: Erik Allen Ford; Sasha Koehn
- Headquarters: Los Angeles, California, United States
- Products: Men's clothing, Women's clothing
- Website: buckmason.com

Buck Mason is an American clothing brand founded in Venice, California, in 2013 by Erik Allen Ford and Sasha Koehn. Buck Mason sells men's and women's apparel online and through 33 brick and mortar retail locations in the US. Buck Mason produces casual basics like t-shirts, denim jeans, blazers, chino pants, and button-up shirts.

== History ==
In April 2015, Ford and Koehn appeared on the 6th season of Shark Tank and rejected an offer from Robert Herjavec.

In 2016 the brand received its initial nationwide publicity via GQ when Tom Brady was photographed wearing a Buck Mason t-shirt for its Man of the Year feature. Since then, the brand has been recommended by publications such as Vogue, New York magazine, and Wirecutter. Buck Mason opened its first physical store in 2015 on Abbot Kinney Boulevard in Venice, Los Angeles.

== Manufacturing ==
Buck Mason produces some Made in USA t-shirts and jeans, while the majority of its manufacturing is international. In 2023, Buck Mason formed the Buck Mason Knitting Mill by purchasing the 150-year-old Mohnton Knitting Mills in Berks County, Pennsylvania. The facility includes a knitting mill in Shillington, Pennsylvania, and a sewing factory in Mohnton, Pennsylvania. Amidst the acquisition, many of the mill’s original employees were retained. As of 2023, about 300,000 of the 500,000 t-shirts the brand sells annually are made in the US from American-made fabric.

=== Collaborations ===
In 2023, Buck Mason partnered with Eddie Bauer to produce a collection of Responsible Down Standard down-filled jackets, pants and accessories. In 2024 Buck Mason collaborated with J. Mueser on collection of Ivy-inspired tailoring (two lightweight suits and a tuxedo) made at the J. Mueser sartoria in Naples, Italy. In 2025 Buck Mason collaborated with J. Press on a collection of traditional Americana menswear. In 2025 Buck Mason collaborated with Lee on a version of the iconic 101J jean jacket made with Japanese selvedge denim and artwork from Studio Shibuya inspired by the rockabilly Yokohama Twistin’ Club. Lee and Buck Mason collaborated on a six-piece capsule collection. English shoemaker Sanders collaborated with Buck Mason on chukka boots and Prince Albert style loafers.
