= Rag & Bone =

American fashion label

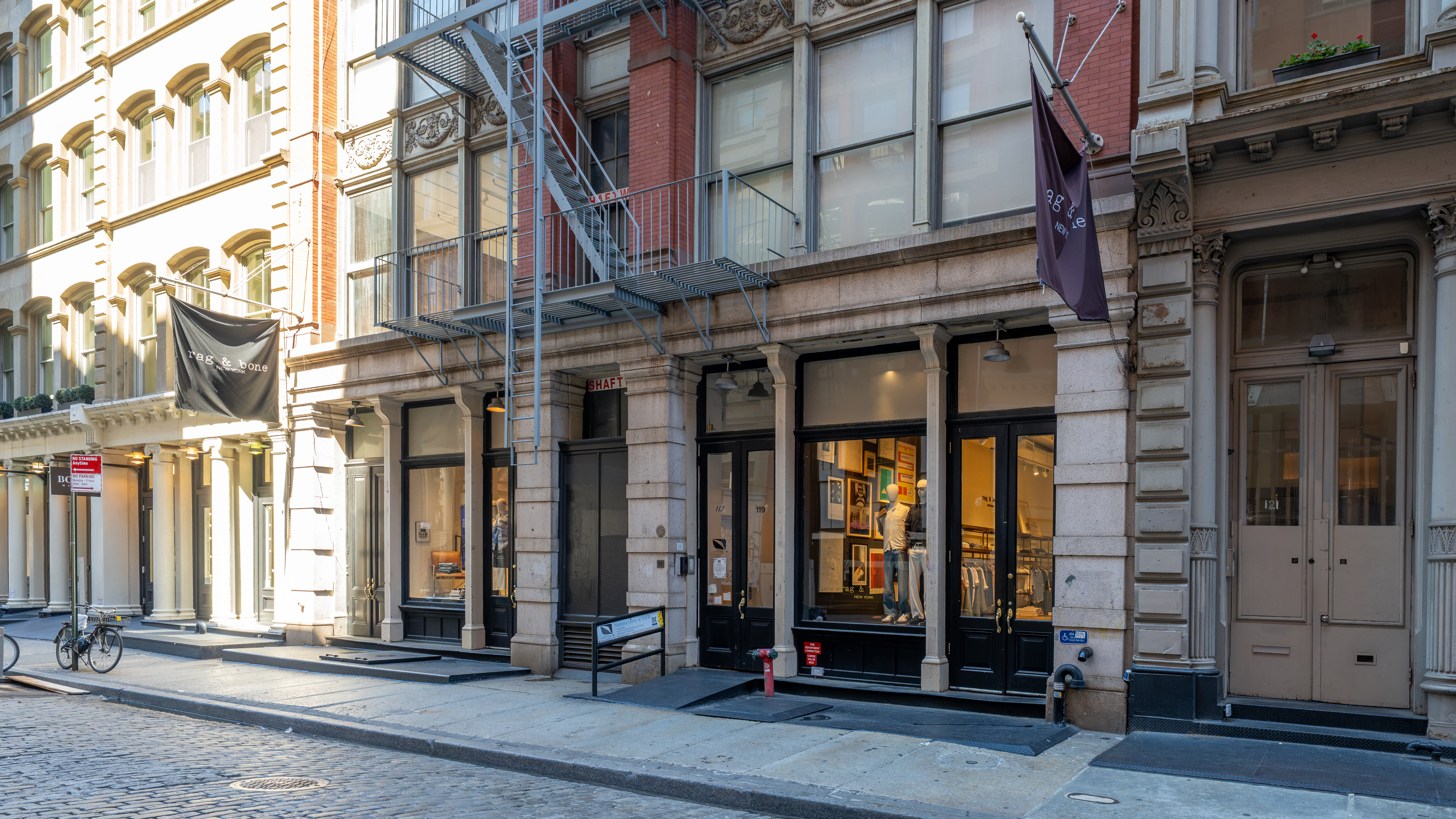
- Storefront in SoHo, Manhattan
- Type: Private company
- Industry: Fashion
- Founded: 2002; 24 years ago
- Founder: Nathan Bogle; Marcus Wainwright
- Headquarters: United States
- Products: Ready-to-wear products, footwear, accessories, fragrance
- Parent: Guess?, Inc. (2024-present); WHP Global (2024–present)
- Website: www.rag-bone.com

Rag & Bone is an American premium fashion brand sold in its own retail stores and more than 700 shops around the world. Marcus Wainwright and Nathan Bogle co-founded the brand in 2002, and Wainwright stepped down as chief brand officer in July 2023. The brand's design oversight is shared between Jennie McCormick and Kyle Sweeney. As of April 2024, Guess? and WHP Global own the brand.

== History ==
Rag & Bone was founded in 2002 by Nathan Bogle and Marcus Wainwright. In 2004 the label launched with a men's line, and a women's line followed in 2005. In 2006, Bogle left the company, and David Neville, who joined the company in 2005, became partner with Wainwright.

With the help of footwear designer Tull Price, former owner of Royal Elastics and current co-owner of FEIT, Rag & Bone Footwear was founded in 2008. Its footwear line includes the Newbury boot.

Today, it offers men's and women's ready-to-wear jeans (under rag & bone/JEAN), footwear and accessories. For their SS15 menswear collection, in lieu of a fashion show, they enlisted friends, including Jerry Seinfeld, Carmelo Anthony, Camille Rowe for a portrait photo series.

In October 2015, Wainwright and Neville were guest speakers at the WWD CEO Summit where they discussed the brand's trajectory and retail footprint, including their newly opened NY concept store, the General Store.

In October 2016, Rag & Bone expanded into fragrance with the launch of a line of eight unisex Eau de Parfums. In the same month, it also signed its first licensing deal for eyewear with Italian eyewear creator, Safilo Group, beginning in January 2018.

In July 2023, Rag & Bone's Chief Merchandising and Design Officer Jennie McCormick took over oversight of womenswear, footwear, and accessories, while Senior Vice President of Design and Merchandising Kyle Sweeney took over menswear and merchandising.

In April 2024, Guess?, Inc. and WHP Global completed the acquisition of the brand.

== Marketing ==
Kate Moss starred in the brand's first ever advertising campaign for FW 2012, and also shot their SS 2013 campaign.

Actor Michael Pitt fronted their first men's campaign for FW 2013, with French actress Léa Seydoux appearing in their women's campaign.

For SS 2014, they cast actors Emile Hirsch and Stacy Martin.

For FW14, Michael Pitt and Winona Ryder, starred in their campaign.

The SS15 campaign featured a Rag & Bone film called The Driver, starring Michael Pitt and Astrid Berges-Frisbey. Directed by Pitt, it won the Best Production Award in the Established Talent category at the Milan Fashion Film Festival in September 2015.

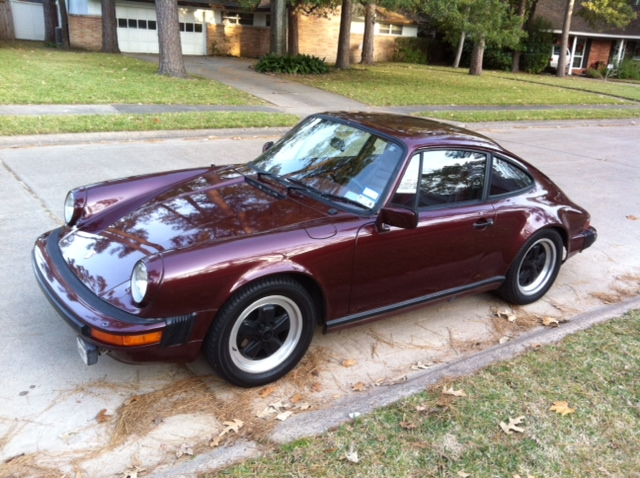
This 1983 Porsche 911SC is similar to the 1979 model destroyed in the brand's FW15 campaign.

The brand raised controversy after an attempt at shock advertising backfired, when it commissioned an advertisement where the body of a vintage Porsche 911SC was crushed. However the Porsche used in the film was actually a shell of a car that was salvaged from a scrap yard for the shoot.

In February 2016, Rag & Bone launched a serial Photo Project ad campaign. The photographs featured women representing the diversity and breadth of the brand. Later that year, the Men’s Project featured an eclectic cast of men from various artistic backgrounds. The project featured John Turturro, Mauro Refosco, Honor Titus, Wiz Khalifa, Harvey Keitel, Mikhail Baryshnikov and Mark Hamill.

In December 2019, Rag & Bone commissioned Stephen Shore to photograph the SS 2020 campaign. He photographed models Ajani Russell, Chloe Fineman, Dylan Penn, Olivia Cooke, Pyper America and Paloma Elsesser wearing the collection while riding the New York City Subway.

== Awards and honors ==
In 2006, Bogle, Neville and Wainwright won the Ecco Domani Fashion Foundation (EDFF) award in the men's category, which included a $25,000 prize fund to stage a fashion show during NYFW. That same year, they were finalists in the Council of Fashion Designers of America's Vogue Fashion Fund. In 2007, they were recipients of the CFDA's Emerging Talent Award. In 2010, Neville and Wainwright won the CFDA/Swarovski Award for Emerging Menswear Talent. In 2013, Rag & Bone received the Breakthrough Award at the Accessories Council Excellence Awards. In 2014, they were nominated for the CFDA Menswear Designer of the Year. In 2015, Neville and Wainwright were honored at Phoenix House’s Fashion Award Dinner. In 2015, Neville and Wainwright were nominated for the CFDA Menswear Designer of the Year award. In 2016, Neville and Wainwright were nominated for the CFDA Menswear Designer of the Year award for the third time.
