= Uris =

Uris may refer to:

== People ==
- Harold Uris (1905–1982), American real estate investor, brother of Percy
- Leon Uris (1924–2003), American novelist
- Percy Uris (1899–1971), American real estate investor, brother of Harold
- Stanley Uris Character from Stephen King's "It"

== Places ==
- Uris Theatre in New York City, now called the George Gershwin Theatre
- Uris Library, on the Cornell University campus
- Uris Hall, on the Cornell University campus

== Other ==
- Uris Buildings Corporation, founded by Harold and Percy Uris

== See also ==
- Uri (disambiguation)
