= 930 Fifth Avenue =

Residential skyscraper in Manhattan, New York

- Interactive map of the 930 Fifth Avenue area

General information
- Type: Cooperative apartments
- Architectural style: Classicizing Modern
- Location: Upper East Side, Manhattan, New York City, U.S.
- Coordinates: 40.773814°N 73.965561°W
- Completed: 1940
- Owner: Fifth Avenue Apartments, Inc.

Height
- Height: 210.44 feet (64.14 m)

Technical details
- Floor count: 19

Design and construction
- Architect: Emery Roth

930 Fifth Avenue is a luxury apartment building on Fifth Avenue on the northeast corner of East 74th Street on the Upper East Side of Manhattan, New York City. The eighteen-story structure and penthouse was designed by noted architect Emery Roth and built in 1940. According to architecture critic Paul Goldberger, 930 and 875 Fifth Avenue show Roth in transition from historicist to modern Art Deco style.

The Fifth Avenue location previously held three private residences which were the estates of Gordon S. Rentschler, Jacob Schiff and Simeon B. Chapin, and were bought by Percy and Harold D. Uris and razed for the new building, which has been described as featuring "a restrained Italian Renaissance style." The building is located within the Upper East Side Historic District.

== Critical reception ==
A 1978 review of Roth's work by architecture critic Paul Goldberger in The New York Times commented that "the Roth firm took on modernism slowly--the Normandy apartments of 1938 at 140 Riverside Drive have an Art Deco-like base, but the ornamental housing for the water tower lurches back suddenly to the Italian Renaissance. There were a few other such schizophrenic designs from the 1930s and buildings such as 930 Fifth Avenue and 875 Fifth Avenue of 1940 show a gradual disappearance of the old ornament."

In 1981, the Times remarked of the residential buildings constructed by the Uris Brothers, "930 Fifth Avenue, 2 Sutton Place, and 880 Fifth Avenue, are among the city's best residential addresses today." Residents of the building have included Samuel and Bella Spewack, Patrick Dennis, Cornelius Vander Starr, Ira Millstein, Risë Stevens, Nancy Hanks, Woody Allen and Eldridge Haynes.
