= 55 Water Street =

Office skyscraper in Manhattan, New York

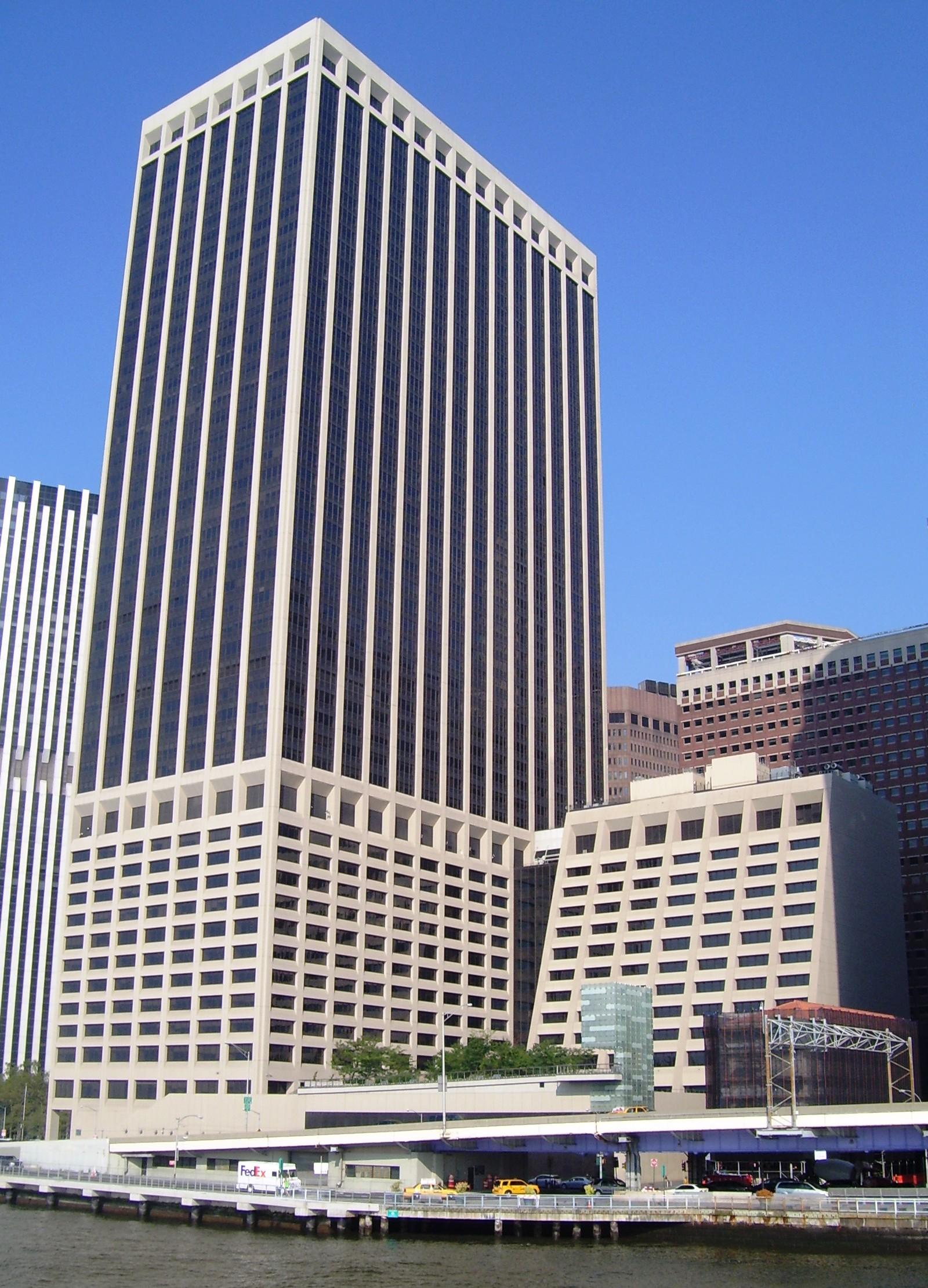
- 55 Water Street as seen from the East River

General information
- Status: Completed
- Type: Office
- Architectural style: International style
- Location: 55 Water Street; Manhattan, New York, U.S.
- Coordinates: 40°42′12″N 74°00′34″W
- Construction started: 1969
- Completed: 1972
- Owner: Retirement Systems of Alabama

Height
- Roof: 687 ft (209 m)

Technical details
- Floor count: 53
- Floor area: 3.5 million square feet (325,000 m^{2})
- Lifts/elevators: 59

Design and construction
- Architects: Emery Roth & Sons; Lee S. Jablin
- Developer: Uris Buildings Corporation
- Structural engineer: James Ruderman

55 Water Street is a 687-foot-tall (209 m) skyscraper on the East River in the Financial District of Lower Manhattan, New York City, United States. The 53-story, 3.5-million-square-foot (325,000 m^{2}) structure was completed in 1972. Designed by Emery Roth and Sons, the building was developed by the Uris brothers. At the time of completion, it was the world's largest privately owned office building by floor area. 55 Water Street is built on a superblock bounded by Coenties Slip to the southwest, Water Street to the northwest, Old Slip to the northeast, and South Street and FDR Drive to the southeast. It is owned by the pension fund Retirement Systems of Alabama (RSA).

55 Water Street is composed of two sections: a 53-story tower to the south and a 15-story wing to the north. The building's facade is made of masonry and glass. The south building is rectangular, while the north building contains sloped walls and runs parallel to the northwestern boundary of the site. The foundations are made of reinforced concrete-slab walls and the superstructure is made of steel. The upper stories each contain 55,000 ft^{2} (5,100 m^{2}) of space, while the lower stories are almost double that size. There is an elevated public plaza on the eastern part of the site, Elevated Acre, and another public space to the southwest, Jeannette Park (now Vietnam Veterans Plaza).

The Uris Buildings Corporation proposed erecting a 53-story building on the site in October 1968, and work began the next year. The building was topped out with a ceremony on June 18, 1971, and tenants began moving into the structure at the beginning of 1972. Initially, several financial firms occupied space at 55 Water Street, including the Chemical Bank of New York, which leased roughly a third of the space and owned 15 percent of the building. National Kinney Corporation bought a majority stake in the Uris properties by late 1973, and it sold 55 Water Street to Olympia and York in 1976. RSA bought the building in 1993 after Olympia and York had difficulties paying off the mortgage. The building was renovated in the 1990s and again in the 2010s.

== Site ==
55 Water Street is in the Financial District of Lower Manhattan in New York City. The land lot covers an entire city block bounded by Coenties Slip to the southwest, Water Street to the northwest, Old Slip to the northeast, and South Street and the FDR Drive to the southeast. The site covers 160,692 ft^{2} (14,928.8 m^{2}), with a frontage of 415 ft (126 m) on Water and South Streets and a depth of 355 ft (108 m).

The Fraunces Tavern block is to the northwest; the New York City Police Museum and 32 Old Slip are directly to the northeast; and 25 Water Street and 2 New York Plaza are to the west. Two blocks west of the building is the South Ferry transportation hub, consisting of the New York City Subway's South Ferry/Whitehall Street station and the Staten Island Ferry's Whitehall Terminal. The building is directly across FDR Drive from the Downtown Manhattan Heliport. The building is assigned its own ZIP Code, 10041. It was one of 41 buildings in Manhattan that had their own ZIP Codes as of 2019.

55 Water Street occupies a superblock, which was created by combining four small city blocks. Prior to the construction of the current office building, the site had contained the headquarters of the Seamen's Church Institute of New York and New Jersey, designed by Warren and Wetmore. Cuylers Alley crossed the site from northwest to southeast, while Front Street bisected the site from southwest to northeast. Both streets were closed to make way for the building's construction. The entire site is reclaimed land; prior to the expansion of Lower Manhattan in the 18th and 19th centuries, the site was part of the East River.

== Architecture ==
The building was designed by the firm of Emery Roth & Sons for Uris Buildings Corporation. It is one of six buildings that Emery Roth and Sons designed in the immediate area. 55 Water Street is composed of two sections: a 53-story "south building" to the southwest (next to Jeannette Park) and a 15-story "north building" to the north, next to Water Street and Old Slip. There is an elevated plaza near the eastern section of the site, adjacent to Old Slip and South Street.

=== Form and facade ===
The building's facade is made of masonry and glass. The south building is rectangular, with its longer axis running parallel to the southwestern boundary of the site. This was done to avoid obstructing views of the East River (next to 55 Water Street's southeastern boundary) from nearby buildings. The north building contains sloped walls and runs parallel to the northwestern boundary of the site. This gives the building an "L"-shape as seen from above. Between floors 2 and 14, the bronze glass windows are inset within the masonry curtain wall. The mullions of the windows are spaced 4 ft (1.2 m) apart.

The 53-story section is 687 ft (209 m) tall to its roof. Including rooftop dormers, the building measures 751 ft (229 m) tall to its pinnacle. The roof is made of a waterproof membrane finished with a layer of slag. Jaros, Baum & Bolles designed LED lighting for the parapet just below the building's roof.

=== Interior ===
When 55 Water Street was completed, it was the largest building in New York City, with 3,200,000 sq ft (297,000 m^{2}) of rentable space. Including non-rentable space, the structure had a total area of 3,500,000 ft^{2} (330,000 m^{2}). At the time, this made 55 Water Street the world's largest privately owned office building. The Merchandise Mart and the Pentagon both had more office space, but they were owned by a governmental entity. The next largest buildings in New York City were the MetLife Building (originally the Pan Am Building), with 2,400,000 ft^{2} (220,000 m^{2}); One New York Plaza, with 2,100,000 ft^{2} (200,000 m^{2}); and the Empire State Building, with 1,800,000 ft^{2} (170,000 m^{2}). The main tower and its shorter wing are connected at each of the lowest 15 stories. The upper stories each contain 55,000 ft^{2} (5,100 m^{2}) of space, while the lower stories are almost double that size. 55 Water Street remained New York City's largest office building as of 2010.

In exchange for constructing public plazas next to the building, Uris was allowed to increase the maximum floor area that was allowed under zoning regulations by an additional 485,640 ft^{2} (45,117 m^{2}). Uris built an underground concourse with provisions for a connection to an unbuilt New York City Subway station. The concourse was built as part of a master plan for transportation in New York City.

The main lobby was originally clad in travertine. In the 1990s, this was replaced with Italian and French marble, with stainless-steel decorative fixtures and aluminum-leaf ceilings. In addition, an onyx panel measuring 10 by 50 ft (3.0 by 15.2 m) was installed behind the reception counter. Following another renovation in 2018, The main lobby contains a video wall, which is composed of two LED displays with 42 tiles each. The displays collectively measure 8 ft (2.4 m) high by 42 ft (13 m) wide, with each display being 21 feet (6.4 m) wide. The lobby also contains a pair of reception desks, a shoeshine stand, coffee bar, and lounge. There are also turnstiles through which tenants and guests must pass.

==== Structural features ====
The foundations are made of reinforced concrete-slab walls. The foundation of the building includes a concrete cofferdam, which surrounds the site and descends to the underlying layer of bedrock. Workers first placed a retaining wall of corrugated sheet-metal panels, which were sunken 40 ft (12 m) below ground, then scooped out the entire site. The cofferdam was then poured behind the retaining wall, and a layer of earth was placed between the cofferdam and retaining wall. This contrasted with the foundations of other skyscrapers in Manhattan, which were typically sunken directly to the bedrock, but it provided space for underground offices, a parking lot, and a 25,000 ft^{2} (2,300 m^{2}) bank vault for Chemical Bank.

The superstructure is made of steel, with "Q"-deck floor slabs. The office stories can carry live loads of 50 to 100 psf (2.4 to 4.8 kPa). The retail, plaza, basement, and mechanical spaces have higher live-load capacities, ranging up to 300 psf (14 kPa) for the plaza level. The building contains 3.5 million square feet (330,000 m^{2}) of modular galvanized steel flooring. Generally, the office floors have a slab-to-slab height of 12.25 ft (3.73 m), although the height of the finished office space could be as small as 8.5 ft (2.6 m). The sub-levels, concourse, and plaza level have a slab-to-slab height of 13.5 ft (4.1 m) as measured between the floor and ceiling, while the retail and mechanical spaces have a slab-to-slab height of 30 ft (9.1 m).

==== Mechanical features ====
Jaros, Baum & Bolles was the mechanical, engineering, and plumbing engineer for the building. Floor 14 contains the building's primary mechanical rooms, ventilation units, and electrical equipment. There is additional mechanical equipment in the basement, on the roof, and on floors 2 and 52. Electricity from the New York City power supply system flows to distribution boards on the concourse, the first sub-level, and floor 14. There are also six electrical closets on each story. In the 1990s, eleven electrical generators were installed on the roof, each with a capacity of 1,750 kW (2,350 hp); these were powered by pumps in the basement levels. As of 2018, there are 14 electrical generators, and the emergency power system can run for up to three days.

There are 71 passenger elevators throughout the building. The 60 passenger elevators in the south building are divided into ten banks of six cars; each elevator bank connects the lobby with five to eight stories. The north building has nine passenger elevators, all connecting the subterranean levels to floors 1–13; five descend to the basement while the other four descend to the sub-basement. The interiors of the elevator cabs were originally decorated in brown burlap but, during a 1990s renovation, the elevator cabs were redecorated in stainless steel and green marble. 55 Water Street also has six freight elevators: four in the south building and two in the north building. Each freight elevator travels from the basement to the highest level in that section of the building, except for a single elevator in the south building, which travels only from the basement to floor 18. None of the elevators travels above floor 52 in the south building.

The building's heating, ventilation, and air conditioning (HVAC) system is divided into several zones, each serving a different group of floors. (Note: There is one HVAC zone from sublevel 2 to floor 2; two zones for floors 3–13; and one zone each for floors 16–33 and 34–51.) 55 Water Street's chiller system was replaced in the 2010s. The new system consists of three chillers, which collectively emit 32.5 million fewer pounds of CO_{2} per year compared to the old system. The chillers each weighed 53 short tons (48 t) and were so heavy that they had to be lifted into the building's facade at night, when there was less traffic in the area. There is also a thermal-energy storage plant with 134 ice tanks, which collectively can store 16,800 ton-hours of heat. The building has numerous water tanks and a surge tank. (Note: There are eight water tanks, which are spread across the roofs of both structures and the 14th and 40th stories of the south building; in addition, the concourse level contains a surge tank. These water tanks are also split into several zones, each spanning multiple floors. Within the south building, the tanks on floor 14 serve floors 2–12, the tanks on floor 40 serve floors 13–36, and the tanks on the roof serve floors 37–52. The north building is served by the tanks on its rooftop.) The tanks are fed by two water mains that connect to the New York City water supply system; the building's domestic water service is also fed by these mains. Two drainage pipes connect with the New York City sewer system.

=== Plazas ===
==== Ground-level plazas ====
When 55 Water Street was built, Coenties Slip (which abutted the site to the southwest) was converted into a pedestrian plaza known as Jeannette Park. The space covers 33,307 ft^{2} (3,094.3 m^{2}). The park had existed adjacent to Coenties Slip since 1884, when it was dedicated to the exploration vessel USS Jeannette, but Paul Friedberg expanded the park in 1971 as part of 55 Water Street's construction. Initially, 55 Water Street's owners were responsible for maintaining the park, which was paved in brick similar to the Elevated Acre plaza next to the building. Plans to redevelop the land into a memorial for Vietnam War veterans were announced in 1982, and it was rededicated as Vietnam Veterans Plaza in 1985. The plaza was renovated and redesigned by Lee S. Jablin of Harman Jablin Architects starting in 2000, and it was rededicated in 2001.

There is also an 10,254 ft^{2} (952.6 m^{2}) pedestrian arcade adjacent to Water Street and Vietnam Veterans Plaza. It effectively functions as an extension of the adjacent sidewalk. A sloped canopy was added in the 1990s.

==== Elevated Acre ====
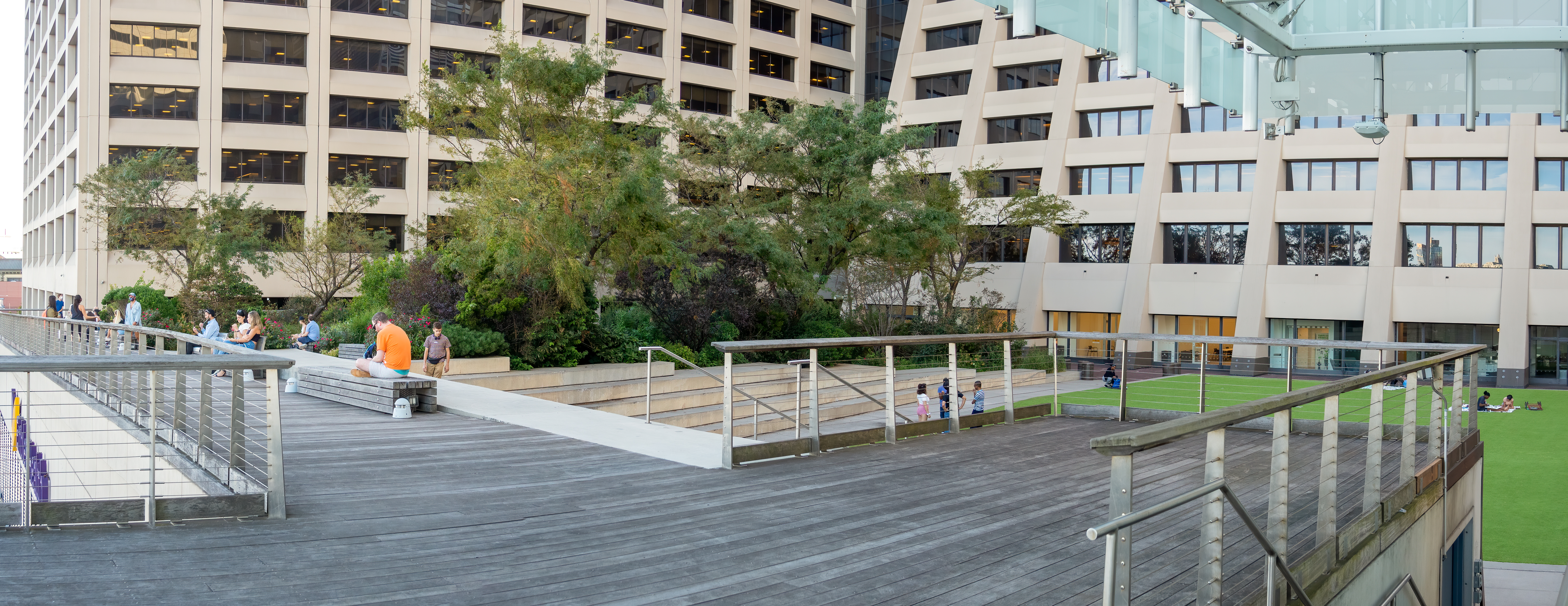
The Elevated Acre

The elevated plaza is a privately owned public space (POPS) known as the Elevated Acre. It is about 30 ft (9.1 m) above street level and accessible via escalators and stairs from Water Street, between the building's two wings. The plaza covers approximately 40,000 sq ft (3,700 m^{2}; 0.92 acres). The space is one of a few elevated POPS in New York City; similar plazas exist at One Bankers Trust Plaza, 300 East 59th Street, 622 Third Avenue, Murray Hill Mews, and Trump Tower. The creation of public space allowed the developers to increase the total square footage of 55 Water Street beyond what zoning regulations would otherwise have allowed on the site. Beneath the plaza is a parking garage.

The Elevated Acre was originally proposed as part of an unbuilt network of elevated walkways and plazas next to the East River. Lawrence Halprin had devised the original plans for the plaza, but M. Paul Friedberg & Associates carried out the final design. The Elevated Acre was originally paved in the same red brick tiles as Jeannette Park. The plaza had very little ornamentation except for a set of curved brick walls, as well as some benches and trees. There were also fountains and pools in the original design. During the 1980s, the Elevated Acre was often closed because, according to the building's owners at the time, the elevator and escalators were frequently being repaired. Furthermore, the plaza was isolated, making it unattractive to pedestrians.

In the 2000s, the Elevated Acre was renovated to designs by Rogers Marvel Architects and Ken Smith, reopening in 2005. The two escalators and elevator on Water Street were replaced with four shorter escalators and a set of stairs. The new design contains a variety of plantings, grasses, and dunes, as well as a multi-tiered terrace. Inside the plaza is a lantern known as the Beacon of Progress, a reference to the former Seamen's Institute building on the site. The Elevated Acre also includes an amphitheater with seven levels and a boardwalk made of Brazilian hardwood. There is a restaurant named Sky55 adjacent to the plaza. The original plans for the redesign had called for a 100-person capacity elevator and an ice rink, which were canceled for lack of funds. The Elevated Acre is available for rental as a venue for special events. Under an agreement with the New York City government, the Elevated Acre may be closed up to six times a year for community or non-profit events and six times a year for private events.

== History ==
=== Development ===
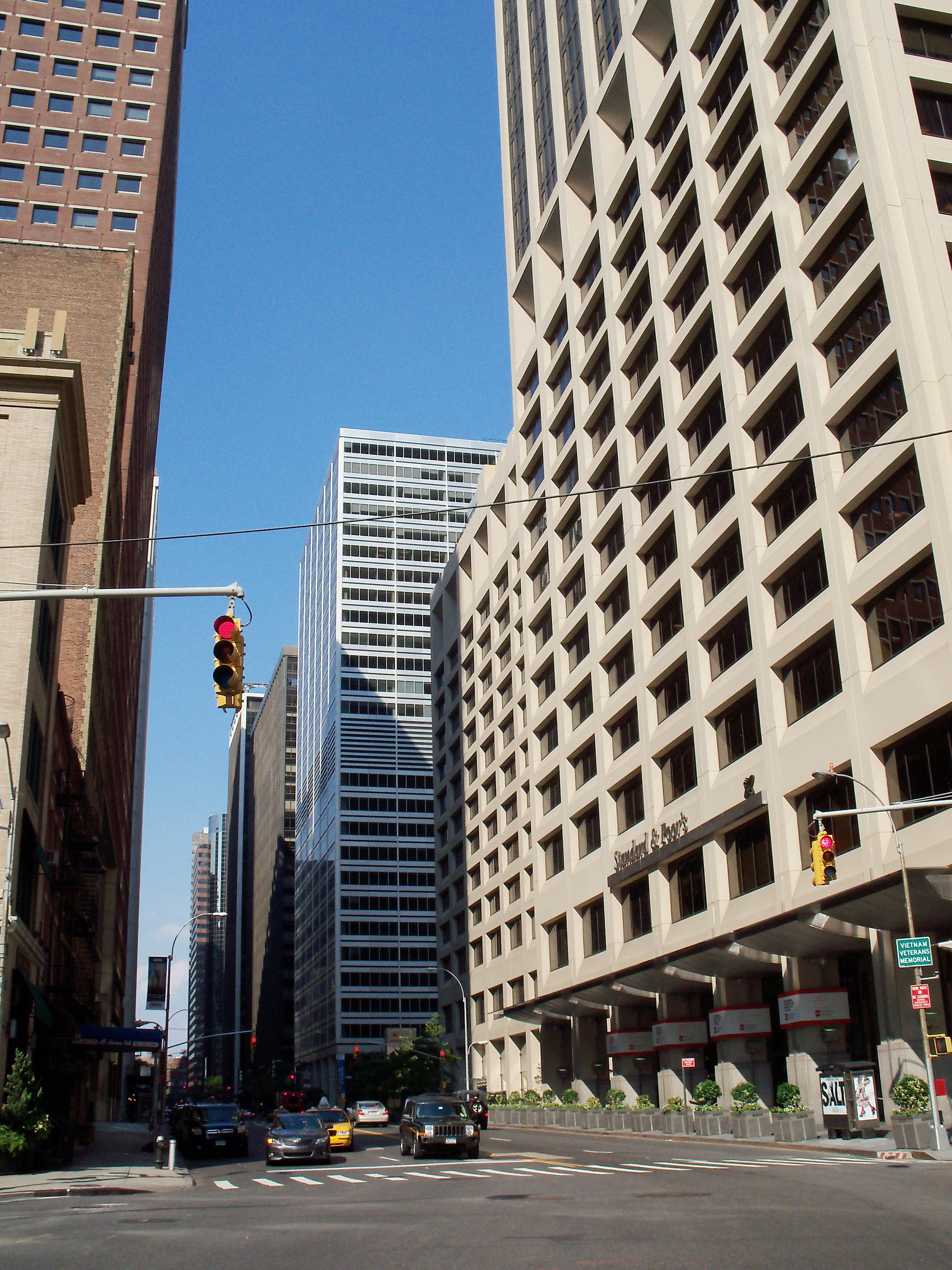
Viewed from Water Street looking east

The Uris Buildings Corporation proposed erecting a 53-story building between Coenties Slip, Water Street, Old Slip, and South Street in October 1968. It was the first project to be proposed as part of the Lower Manhattan Plan, a New York City governmental initiative to guide development along the Lower Manhattan waterfront. The New York Stock Exchange had considered leasing space at the building before it was officially announced, but the NYSE ultimately decided against doing so. In exchange for permission to close Cuylers Alley and Front Street for the construction of the new building, Uris proposed improving the adjacent Jeannette Park and erecting a raised public plaza within the new development. The proposal required that the New York City Planning Commission enact a zoning amendment in 1968, since elevated plazas could not rise more than 5 ft (1.5 m) above the curb. In January 1969, the Board of Estimate approved Uris's proposal to construct an elevated pedestrian plaza alongside its building.

When construction started in 1969, developers estimated that the building's annual rents would range from $8 to $10/ft^{2} ($86 to $108/m^{2}). The Chemical Bank of New York agreed in principle to lease 1.1×10^{6} ft^{2} (100,000 m^{2}) in January 1969, in exchange for a 15 percent stake in the building. When the lease was finalized in late 1969 at a price of $250 million, it was the largest commercial lease ever executed. Brokerage firm Dominick & Dominick leased 275,000 ft^{2} (25,500 m^{2}) across five floors in March 1969, becoming the first tenant to finalize a lease at 55 Water Street. Two weeks later, Bear Stearns leased 200,000 ft^{2} (19,000 m^{2}) on four floors.

During the building's construction, the chief engineers met every Monday to discuss the engineering difficulties of the site. Goldman Sachs and Halle & Stieglitz collectively leased 165,000 ft^{2} (15,300 m^{2}) in May 1970, and the Interstate United Corporation subsequently leased space for a restaurant at the base of the building. Workers raised a 1,000 lb (450 kg) girder to the 53rd story of the tower section at a topping-out ceremony on June 18, 1971. The same day, Uris announced that Prudential Insurance had agreed to place a $150 million loan on the building; it was the largest mortgage ever placed on a privately developed structure. In exchange, Prudential would acquire a 25 percent stake in the building's equity. At the time, 70 percent of the office space had been leased.

The Whitney Museum announced it would open a satellite location at 55 Water Street by the end of 1971. According to Uris Buildings chairman Percy Uris, the branch "would contribute nicely to the feel of the building and the amenities it offers to people who work there". A. G. Becker & Co. and NYSE subsidiary Stock Clearing Corporation leased additional space that November. Other early tenants included financial services firms White Weld & Co., which took two floors, and G. H. Walker & Co., which leased one floor and part of another. Prudential granted a $130 million mortgage at the end of 1972.

=== Opening and early years ===
55 Water Street was completed in 1972 with 3,268,000 ft^{2} (303,600 m^{2}) of rentable space, and tenants began moving into the structure at the beginning of that year. 55 Water Street was the largest speculative office development in Lower Manhattan for a decade, until 52 Broadway was developed in the 1980s. The building's completion coincided with a decline in demand for office space in New York City. Meanwhile, after Percy Uris had died in 1971, his brother Harold began negotiating to sell off all his company's assets, including 55 Water Street. National Kinney Corporation had bought a majority stake in the Uris properties by late 1973, upon which a large portion of the office space was still vacant. National Kinney then sold a 25 percent stake in the building's ownership to the PIC Corporation; at the time, three-quarters of the building had been leased.

The Whitney Museum opened a branch museum on the third floor of the building in September 1973. The branch occupied 4,800 ft^{2} (450 m^{2}) of sparsely designed gallery space. The Whitney paid $1 a year; the operating cost was covered by 29 institutions or companies with offices in the Financial District. The building's owners continued to experience financial issues, and National Kinney placed 55 Water Street and ten other Uris properties for sale shortly after acquiring these buildings. The creditors and mortgagee agreed in 1975 to postpone the collection of their claims until the building had more tenants and its cash flow improved.

In 1976, Samuel J. LeFrak expressed interest in buying 55 Water Street and most of the other Uris structures, as the buildings collectively contained four percent of Manhattan's office space. Simultaneously, Manufacturers Hanover planned to lease two additional floors and a mezzanine, provided that the city government approve a tunnel between 55 Water Street and the company's operations headquarters at the neighboring 4 New York Plaza. LF Rothschild leased two floors in mid-1976.

=== Olympia & York ownership ===
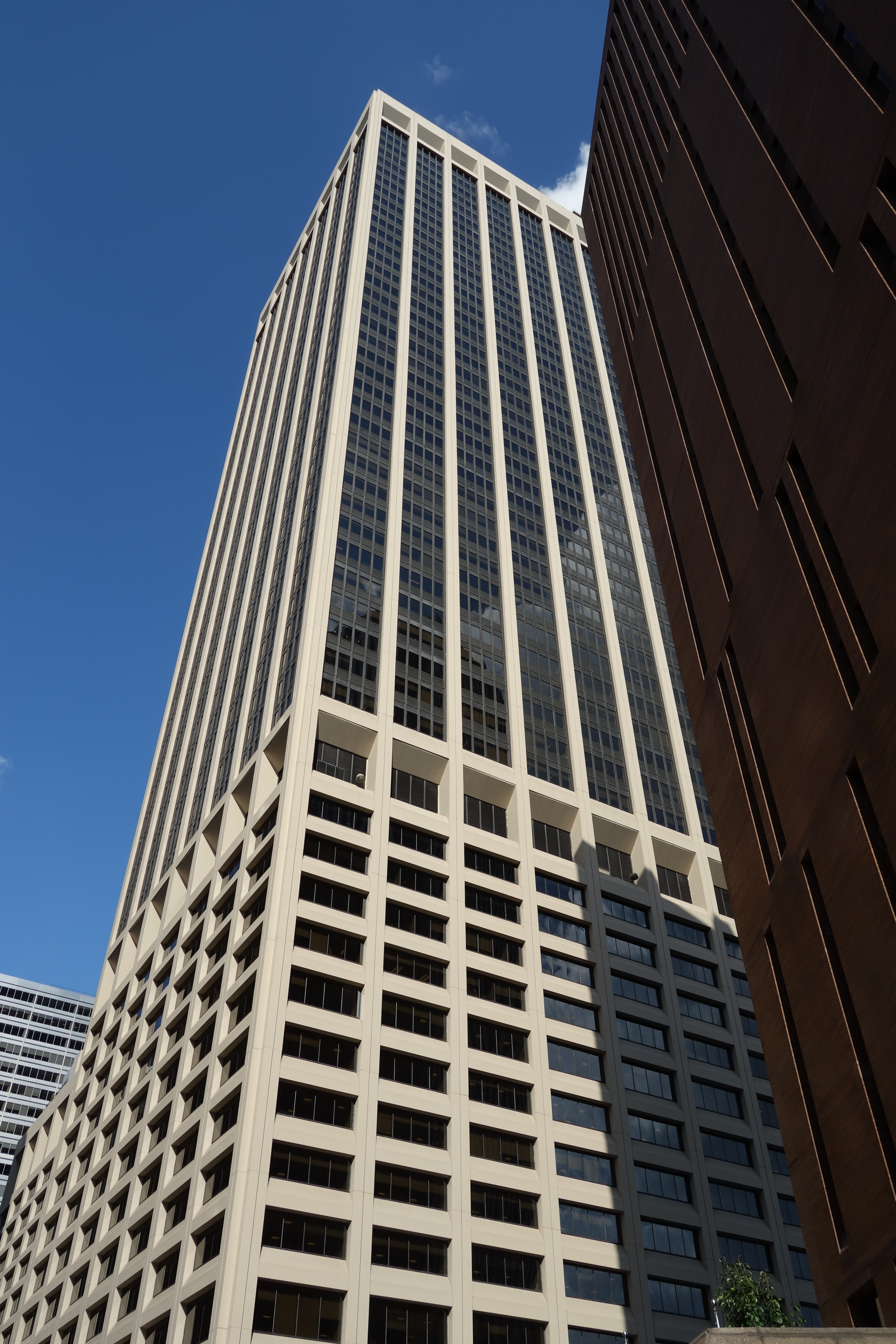
Seen from the intersection of Water Street and Coenties Slip

National Kinney decided to sell off 55 Water Street and eight other Uris buildings in November 1976; at the time, the firm owned 51 percent of the building. Olympia and York bought 55 Water Street in 1977 as part of a $50 million transaction involving several Uris properties. The transactions made the firm one of the largest commercial landlords in Manhattan. Of the properties Olympia & York bought from National Kinney, only 55 Water Street still had a significant amount of vacant space, with 50,000 ft^{2} (4,600 m^{2}) still available for lease.

By the late 1970s, the vacancies at 55 Water Street and other nearby buildings in Lower Manhattan were being filled. During that time, the remaining space was leased by companies such as securities firm Lehman Brothers. By 1979, the building was fully leased; payment-services company American Express had leased the last large block of vacant space, covering 191,000 ft^{2} (17,700 m^{2}) across four stories.

By 1980, the valuation of 55 Water Street had increased drastically. Consequently, Whitney Museum was forced to relocate from its space in the building that year, since the owners wanted to rent out the museum space. At the time, the building housed the headquarters or offices of several large financial companies, including Lehman Brothers, L. F. Rothschild, Goldman Sachs, and Bear Stearns; some of these firms had their own dining rooms. The third story contained a restaurant called the Harbor Club.

During the 1980s, Olympia and York obtained a $550 million mortgage loan in the form of a bond offering. Tenants such as L.F. Rothschild were subleasing their space by the late 1980s, although there were few potential lessees. The building had significant amounts of asbestos which, under an anti-asbestos regulation passed in 1985, had to be removed before the space in the building could be subleased. Other firms, such as Morgan Stanley, moved out of the building entirely. The building was refinanced with two bond issues in 1986, and pension fund Retirement Systems of Alabama (RSA) purchased 19.5 percent of the bonds for $100 million. The financing included $435 million in interest-paying bonds and $113 million in zero-coupon bonds.

The 1990s recession affected Olympia and York's finances, causing vacancy rates to increase. The building was still the city's most valuable privately owned office building, with an assessed valuation of about $280 million in 1990. By the next year, the leases on two-fifths of the building's office space were scheduled to expire within two years. Credit rating agencies had downgraded their ratings of 55 Water Street's mortgage loan, which Olympia and York was having trouble paying off. Olympia and York met with its bondholders in May 1992 in an attempt to retain control of the building. Olympia and York indicated that it would not be able to pay for asbestos removal, which would cost at least $20/ft^{2} ($220/m^{2}). The building already had 620,000 ft^{2} (58,000 m^{2}) of vacant space at the time, but the vacancy rate was to reach 50 percent by the end of the year. One financial executive said the building rapidly "went from being a premier financial services tower to bankrupt".

=== RSA ownership ===
==== 1990s ====
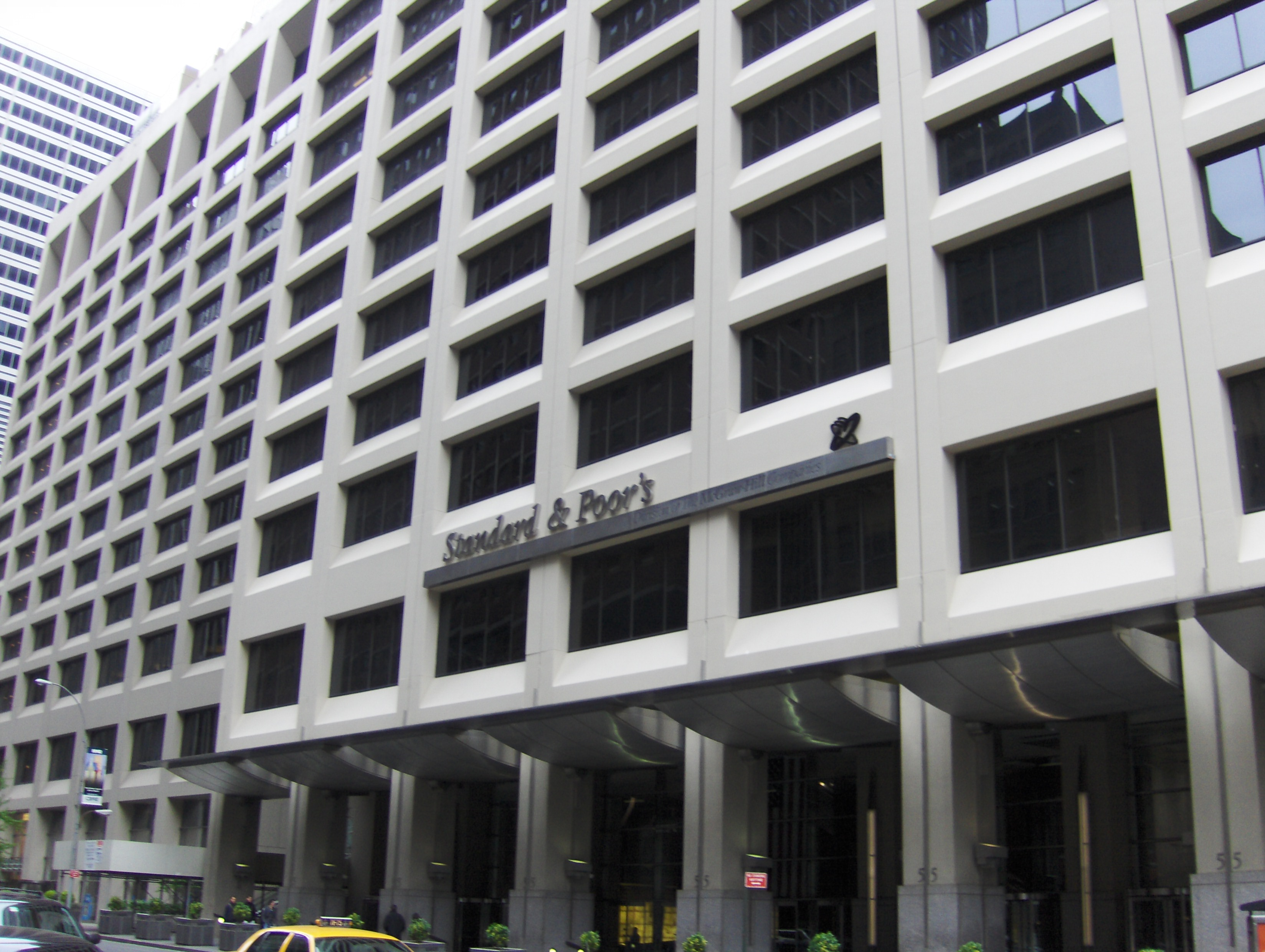
The base of the building, with a sign advertising tenant Standard & Poor's

Olympia and York agreed in September 1992 to transfer ownership of the building to its bondholders in exchange for wiping out about $548 million in debt. Each of the bondholders could swap their bonds for equity stakes in 55 Water Street or sell their bonds to RSA for cash. To ensure that the building would be free of debt, RSA and the other creditors consented to a consensual bankruptcy filing if creditors chose to keep their bonds. The proposed sale valued the building at only $149 million, even though the city had appraised the building as being worth $540 million. A subsidiary of Olympia and York filed for Chapter 11 bankruptcy protection in May 1993, allowing the buyers to perform an equity swap. The purchase was finalized that October, essentially erasing all the building's debt. RSA bought out most of the other creditors for about $120 million. Following this purchase, RSA owned an 88 percent stake in the building, and there was $60 million on hand to pay for renovations. At the time, the building was 65 percent occupied.

RSA created a subsidiary, the New Water Street Corporation, to operate and manage the building. The new owners immediately appointed Jones Lang Wootton as the building's leasing agent. After acquiring the building, RSA planned to remove asbestos, upgrade the elevators, and add sprinklers to each floor. RSA hired Kohn Pedersen Fox to design cosmetic remodeling plans, and the pension fund spent over $20 million to remove asbestos from the building and install a back-up electrical system. The cost of renovations had increased to $125 million or $140 million by the mid-1990s. The building still had large amounts of vacant office space at the time, despite offering relatively low rents of around $20/ft^{2} ($220/m^{2}). During this time, major tenants at 55 Water Street included the Depository Trust Company and the Securities Industry Automation Corporation.

In the years after RSA acquired the building, annual income frequently increased by more than 10 percent from year to year. RSA upgraded 55 Water Street's communication and electrical systems to attract tenants, advertising the building as the "Tower of Power". Much of the office space had been filled by 1997, when Standard & Poor's leased 937,000 ft^{2} (87,100 m^{2}). Several other financial firms such as Royal Bank of Canada and Goldman Sachs had expressed interest in leasing space in the building. The renovation of 55 Water Street was completed in 1999 at a cost of $156 million. At that point, the building was 100 percent occupied. About a third of the space was still occupied by Chemical Bank successor Chase Bank, whose lease expired in 2003; the bank planned to move out after its lease expired. The owners were planning a renovation for the building's elevated plaza, as well as the public space next to Vietnam Veterans Plaza, both of which were underused.

==== 2000s ====
In early 2001, Goldman Sachs considered constructing a 13-story, 240 ft (73 m) annex on the site of the Elevated Acre. The annex would have included seven large trading floors, each covering 56,000 ft^{2} (5,200 m^{2}). In addition, the height of the north tower would have been increased by 35 ft (11 m). The entire project would have cost $850 million and would have been completed in 2004. To compensate for the loss of public space, Goldman Sachs proposed paying for various improvements of public space nearby. The plans were dropped shortly after they were presented. Goldman Sachs cited economic conditions, but some neighborhood residents had expressed opposition to the plan. Following the cancellation of Goldman Sach's plans, RSA hired Mary Ann Tighe as the building's broker. RSA and the Municipal Art Society sponsored a design competition for a renovation of the elevated plaza. In September 2002, RSA hired a joint venture of Ken Smith and Rogers Marvel Architects to redesign the plaza.

Following the September 11 attacks in 2001, the building's managers implemented security checkpoints in the lobby, resulting in rent increases for all tenants. To fill the empty space, the owners offered two years of free rent to new tenants. HIP Health Plan of New York (later part of EmblemHealth) leased the entire north building and part of the south building in 2003. At the time, it was the largest corporate relocation to Lower Manhattan since the September 11 attacks. Simultaneously, the Teachers' Retirement System of New York City also rented 150,000 ft^{2} (14,000 m^{2}) at the building. The Elevated Acre plaza was rededicated in 2005 following a renovation. The New York City Department of Transportation leased more than 400,000 ft^{2} (37,000 m^{2}) in 2006, and publishing company Bowne & Co. also leased space.

==== 2010s to present ====
During the early 21st century, CBRE Group became the leasing agent. On October 29, 2012, the building sustained damage related to Hurricane Sandy when a 14-foot-high (4.3 m) storm surge flooded the area. The basement levels were severely damaged, and the emergency generators on the roof could not operate because they were powered by pumps in the basement. The building remained closed for several weeks due to flooding. While repairs were being conducted, a fire broke out on November 23, causing injuries to 27 people. To prepare for future storms, the building's owner planned to relocate electrical equipment from the basement to the third floor. In 2014, Plaza Construction installed a flood barrier system around the building; when activated, the flood walls could protect against an 8 ft (2.4 m) surge.

McGraw Hill Financial moved its headquarters to 55 Water Street in June 2015, and Hugo Boss moved its North American headquarters there the same year. By 2018, RSA earned $155 million in rental income annually, and the building was worth an estimated $1.5 billion. In 2019, software company Justworks announced it would be moving into 270,000 sq ft (25,000 m^{2}) on four floors, and the Teachers' Retirement System of New York City subleased a portion of one floor. MJHS Health System leased 138,000 ft^{2} (12,800 m^{2}) in March 2022, the largest lease to be finalized in lower Manhattan in 18 months.

== Impact ==
When the building was completed, architectural critic Ada Louise Huxtable called the building "a significant demonstration of how to stop worrying and love the boom" in office development. Huxtable also wrote that the building's elevated plaza was "a skillful job in urban design". By contrast, in 1981, Paul Goldberger described 55 Water Street, along with many skyscrapers on Sixth Avenue in Midtown Manhattan, as having been "designed by commercial architectural firms which admitted to few interests beyond the quick and efficient creation of rentable space". According to Goldberger, these types of buildings used common materials such as concrete and glass, creating edifices that "added little either visually or socially to the life of the city". The AIA Guide to New York City described the north building as resembling "a complicated cell phone tower".

The building's construction was chronicled in 55 Water Street, a collection of short stories by Marjorie Iseman, which was published in 1982. The collection is divided into two parts, which Iseman said are respectively about "wreckers and wrecking" and "excavation". In addition, the New York-New York Hotel and Casino in Paradise, Nevada, contains a 36-story replica of 55 Water Street. This replica is placed next to copies of other large New York City buildings.

== See also ==
- List of tallest buildings in New York City
