= 2112 =

2112 may refer to:

- AD 2112, a year in the 22nd century
- 2112 BC
- 2112 (album), an album by Rush
  - "2112" (song)
- John Byrne's 2112, a comic book series prequel to Next Men

== See also ==
- Mars 2112, a space themed restaurant in Times Square, New York City
- 2112: The Birth of Doraemon, a 1995 Japanese anime film
