= 880 Fifth Avenue =

Residential skyscraper in Manhattan, New York

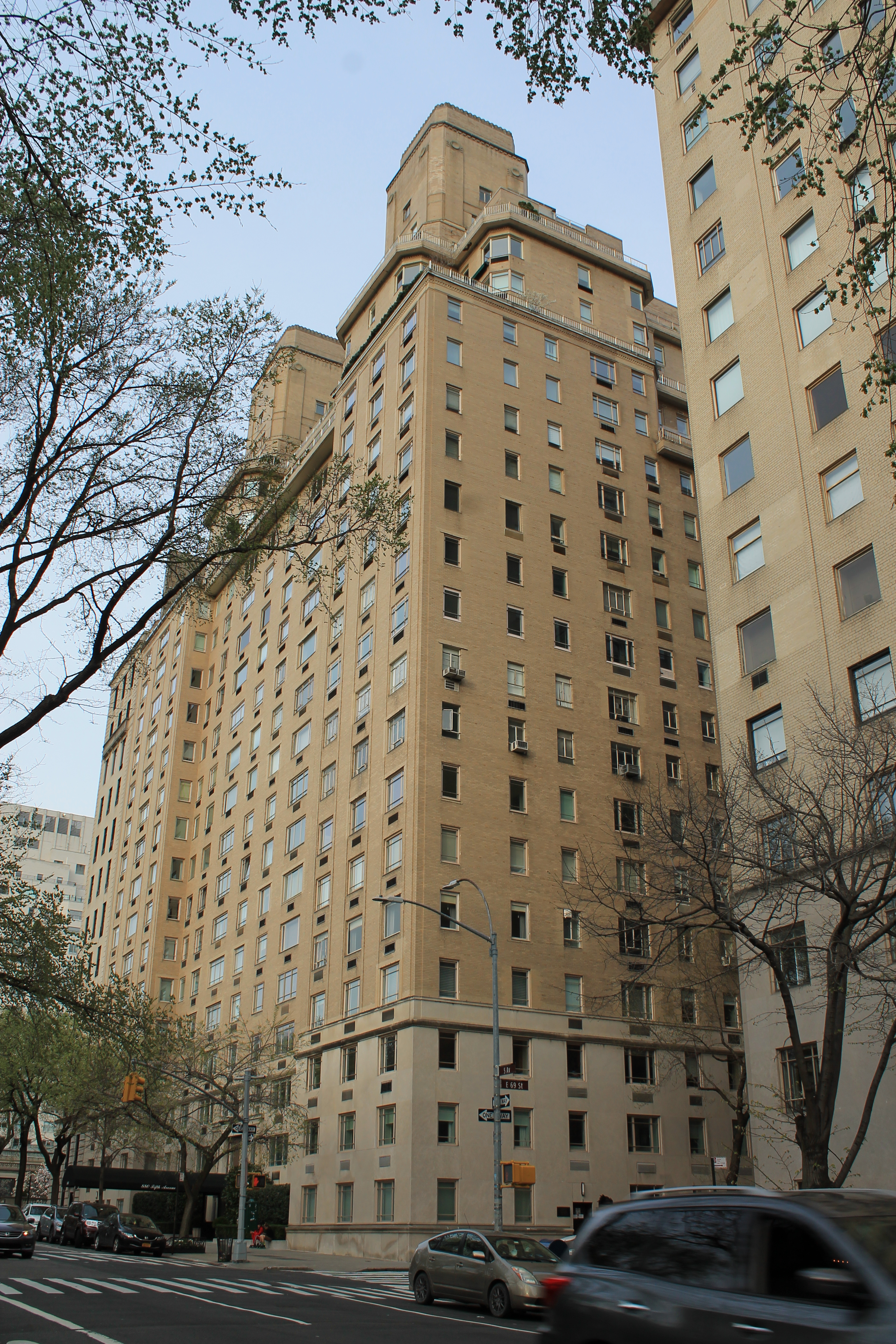

- Location within New York City

General information
- Status: Completed
- Type: Residential
- Architectural style: Art Deco
- Location: Manhattan, New York, United States
- Coordinates: 40°46′14″N 73°58′05″W
- Current tenants: 162 unites
- Completed: 1948

Technical details
- Floor count: 21

Design and construction
- Architect: Emery Roth
- Developer: Harold Uris, Percy Uris

880 Fifth Avenue is a luxury apartment building on Fifth Avenue at the northeast corner of 69th Street in New York City. The Art-Deco-styled building has 21 floors and features 162 residential units. 880 Fifth Avenue is also one of the few Fifth Avenue buildings to have a garage.

== Background ==
It was the final building by architect Emery Roth. The developers were Harold Uris and Percy Uris. Built in 1948, the design for the building was commissioned during the war as the Uris brothers anticipated the war's end and the lifting of the wartime restrictions on non war-related construction. *80 is "stylistically related" to Roth's 875 Fifth Avenue, on the other side of 69th Street his building The Normandy at 140 Riverside Drive, all in the fashionable art moderne, or Art Deco style. 880 was built on the site of home of Edward H. Harriman, designed by the Herter Brothers in 1881, and the Adolph E. Lewisohn house, designed by C. W. Clinton in 1882.

The limestone facade is mildly Art Deco with classical touches. It is topped by a modest pair of towers, but overall the building is dignified, rather than exciting, designed to sell at a profit to an upscale clientele and to fit in among the classical buildings, including the adjacent Frick Museum.

In 1981, The New York Times remarked of the residential buildings constructed by the Uris brothers, "930 Fifth Avenue, 2 Sutton Place, and 880 Fifth Avenue, are among the city's best residential addresses today."

== Famous residents ==
Notable residents have included Broadway songwriter Mitch Leigh, Alexander Steinberg, Joseph G. Hirsch, and entrepreneur and philanthropist John D. Hertz.
