= Uris Buildings Corporation =

- Type: Public
- Industry: Real estate development
- Predecessor: Uris Brothers
- Founded: 1960; 66 years ago
- Fate: Acquired by National Kinney Corporation in 1971
- Headquarters: New York, New York, US
- Key people: Harold Uris; Percy Uris
- Products: Office Buildings

Uris Buildings Corporation was a New York City commercial real estate development company created by Harold and Percy Uris in 1960 from a predecessor private partnership. They retained 60% ownership in the corporation. One of the last buildings the brothers built together was the Uris Building housing the Uris Theater. Soon after Percy's death in 1971, Harold sold the corporation to National Kinney Corporation for $115 million, but the assets were soon foreclosed in the real estate market collapse of New York's 1973–75 recession.

== History ==
Percy started the business in 1920 with his father Harris H. Uris (c. 1867–1945), a Lithuanian immigrant and former ornamental iron worker. The senior Uris, with his brothers, operated a large iron foundry that produced ornamental iron and included the New York City Subway among its clients. Percy graduated with a business degree from Columbia Business School in 1920, and went into partnership in 1925 after Harold graduated with a degree in civil engineering from Cornell. The brothers first focused on residential development, including emergency housing during World War II. They were successful during the 1920s and early 30s building numerous buildings in that time frame, but struggled during the Great Depression.

They resumed apartment construction in 1937 with 2 Sutton Place and 930 Fifth Avenue in 1939. Few other prominent New York City builders of the 1920s boom were still active after the war. They stopped building apartments in 1950, pulling out due to dissatisfaction with rent controls that were imposed during war but never discontinued. After that, they concentrated on commercial real estate development projects. They owned their developments personally until they incorporated in 1960 forming Uris Buildings, a public company. The offering of company's shares provide the financial capital for even larger projects.

From 1945 to 1971, Uris Buildings and its predecessor build over 13,000,000 sq ft (1,200,000 m^{2}) of office space in Manhattan. By 1969, it was the largest publicly owned investment builder, with the brothers retaining 60% ownership.

Percy handled most financial aspects of the business, such as buying and selling property, negotiation of loans, financing, rental pricing, and profit calculation. Management of construction activity was primarily the realm of Harold. Uris frequently used Emery Roth & Sons as architect.

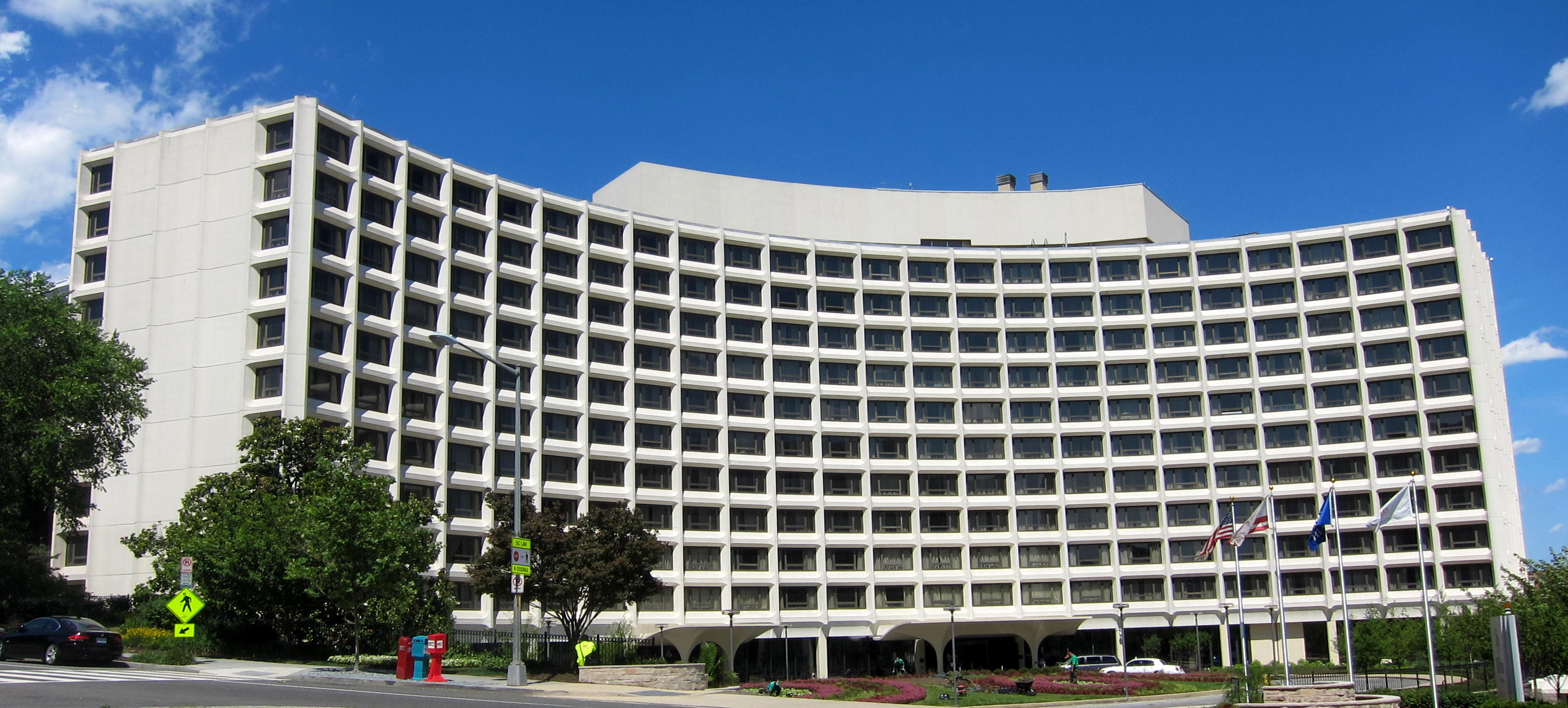
Washington D.C. Hilton

Projects outside of New York included the Hilton Hotel in Washington, DC that was built with five stories underground in order to have the desired space while conforming to the district's height restrictions. In Philadelphia, Uris built the first modern building in the city's central business district redevelopment known as Penn Center in 1953–1954.

The company was reported to be valued at over $600 million in 1972.

Uris Brothers developments were not architecturally imaginative or sophisticated. The company was focused on creating large profitable spaces at low cost. Famous real estate investor Harry Helmsley credits Uris with "having a profound effect on shaping the Park Avenue skyline above 45th Street".

== Park Avenue ==
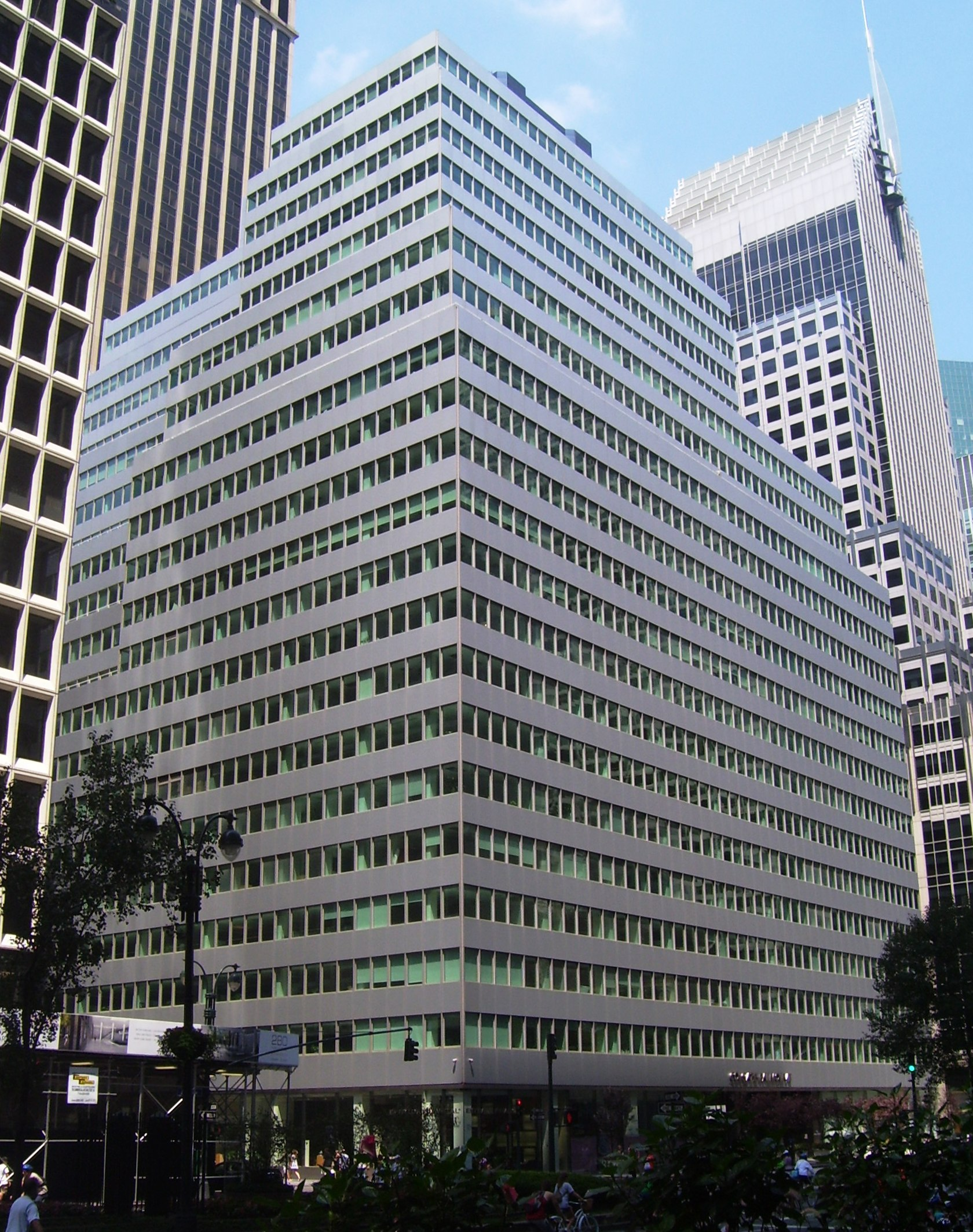
Colgate-Palmolive Building

Under Park Avenue in New York City, north of 45th Street, is the Park Avenue Tunnel which carried the New York Central and New York, New Haven, & Hartford tracks through Manhattan to Grand Central Terminal. Buildings on Park Avenue near the terminal, in an area known as Terminal City, were successfully built over the tracks, which run in a double-deck subterranean steel structure, in the early 20th century. Uris was the first to build in this manner post-war when it was much more challenging due to desire for much higher buildings, and much denser rail traffic which could not be interrupted during construction.

In 1955, Uris demolished an apartment building at 300 Park and replaced it with the glass and aluminum sheathed Colgate-Palmolive Building. The building was financially successful because analysis by structural engineer James Ruderman determined that some below-grade structural columns of the old building, which threaded through the track structure to bedrock 50 feet (15 m) down, could be reused significantly reducing cost. The success of the project led Uris to purchase air rights over the tracks at 320 and 350 Park. Other developers soon followed and several more buildings were then built over the tracks.

== Penn Center ==
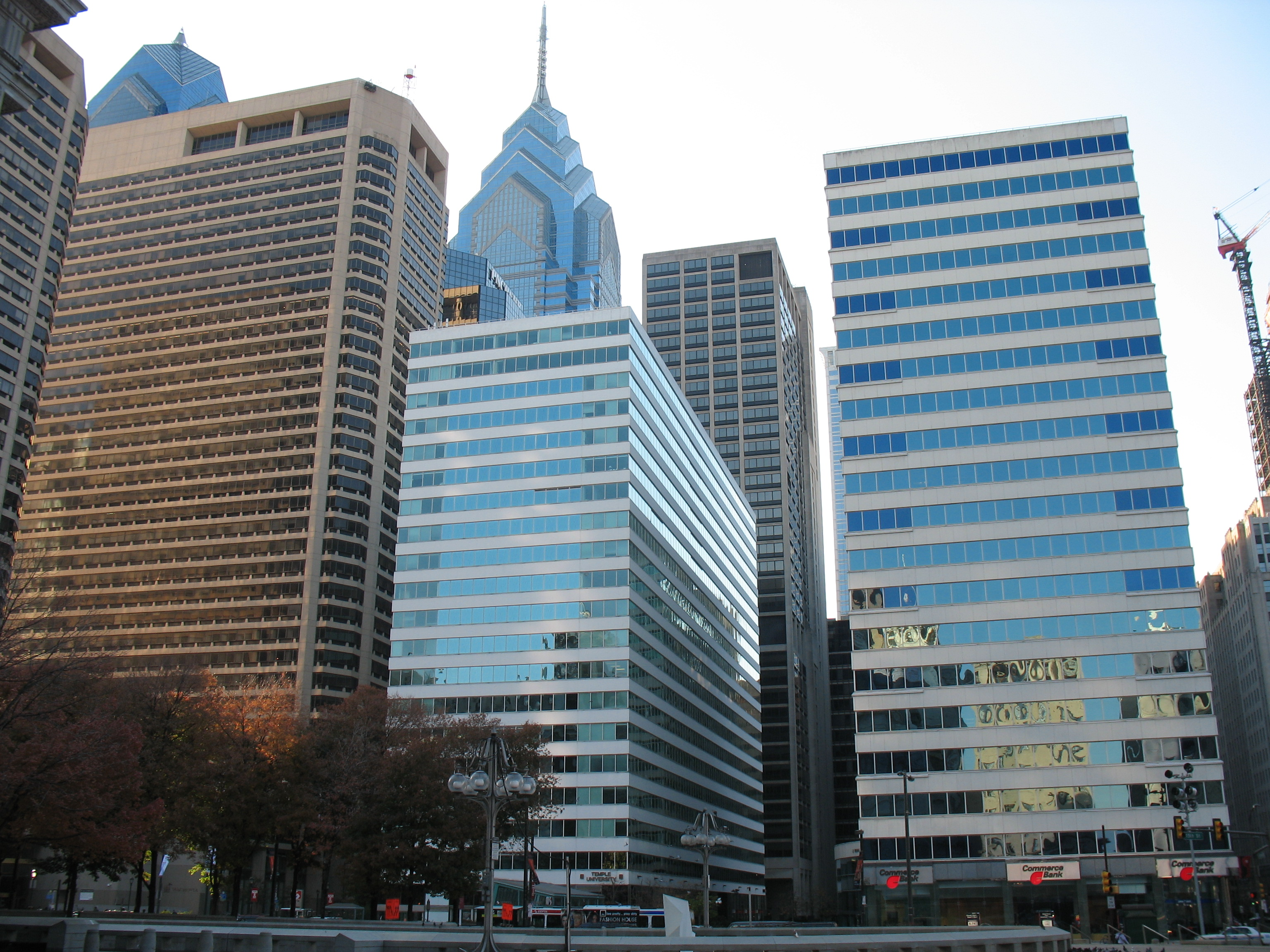
Two Penn Center (right) and Three Penn Center (center)

In 1953, drawings for the Three Penn Center building, designed by Emery Roth & Sons, were released. The design was viewed critically and called an "unremarkable twenty-story slab". Then Yale School of Architecture professor Louis Kahn said an architectural student would receive a failing grade for such a project. Arthur C. Kaufmann, CEO of Gimbels in Philadelphia and member of a Citizens' Advisory Committee for the project disavowed it. Architectural Forum said it was "third-rate architecture". Uris ignored the criticism and proceeded with their plans. Mayor Joseph Clark said the building did not conform to the Penn Center plan and insisted that Uris submit the building plans for review by the city Art Commission. The Art Commission had authority over buildings in some parts of the city, but not Penn Center. Uris stalled and eventually said the structural steel had already been ordered so no changes were possible.

Three years later, while Three Penn Center was under construction, Uris released plans for Two Penn Center, its second building in the project. This building was considered as bad as the first building. The Board of Design realized Uris would not improve the aesthetics of the building unless forced and recommended changes to make the building more attractive. This building was under authority of the Art Commission due to its location near the scenic Benjamin Franklin Parkway. The Art Commission, who did not want to replicate the architecture of Three Penn Center, reached agreement with Uris that steel would not be ordered until the commission approved the plans. In spite of the agreement, Uris again claimed the steel was ordered and the design could not be changed. The commission gave up trying to oppose Uris.

== Media ==
The New Yorker published a cartoon on March 10, 1962, featuring a collage of scenes from construction sites captioned "Damn the Uris brothers, damn the Tishmans, damn Zeckendorf..."

== Notable projects ==
Uris Brothers developed the following buildings either solely or jointly with others.

Name (original)	Address (NYC unless noted)	Alt Name	Year	Type	Notes
Court Square Building	2 Lafayette Street		1926	Residential	
1 University Place	1 University Place		1929	Residential	
Dixie Hotel	250 West 43rd Street	Hotel Carter	1930	Hotel	
Hotel St. Moritz	50 Central Park South	Ritz Carlton	1932	Hotel	
2 Sutton Place	2 Sutton Place		1938	Residential	
930 Fifth Avenue	930 Fifth Avenue		1940	Residential	
880 Fifth Avenue	880 Fifth Avenue		1948	Residential	Their last residential building
55 Water Street	55 Water Street		1972	Office Building	Their last major building World's largest office building in 1972
American Tobacco Company Building	245 Park Avenue	American Brands Building; Bear Sterns Building	1967	Office Building	
JC Penney Building	333 W 33rd Street	Pennview Hotel	1925	Office Building	JC Penney purchased a different building in 1977
ITT Building	75 Broad Street		1928	Office Building	Millennium High School now located on 13th floor
RCA Communications Building	60 Broad Street		1961	Office Building	
Uris Building	1633 Broadway	Paramount Plaza	1971	Office Building	Location of Uris Theatre, now Gershwin Theatre
1301 Avenue of the Americas	1301 Avenue of the Americas	Calyon Building, Crédit Lyonnais Building, Crédit Agricole CIB Building, RJR Nabisco Building, JC Penney Building	1964	Office Building	Not to be confused with the 1925 JCPenney Building
New York Hilton Midtown	1335 Avenue of the Americas		1964	Hotel	
Look Building	488 Madison Avenue		1950	Office Building	National Register of Historic Places listed
380 Madison Avenue	380 Madison Avenue		1953	Office Building	previously a Ritz-Carlton hotel
Colgate-Palmolive Building	300 Park Avenue		1955	Office Building	
575 Madison Avenue	575 Madison Avenue		1950	Office Building	
485 Lexington Avenue	485 Lexington Avenue		1956	Office Building	
2 Broadway	2 Broadway		1959	Office Building	
850 Third Avenue	850 Third Avenue		1961	Office Building	
Manufacturers Hanover Trust Building	350 Park Avenue		1962	Office Building	
Sperry Rand Building	1290 Avenue of the Americans		1962	Office Building	
111 Wall Street	111 Wall Street	Citibank Building	1966	Office Building	
Harper & Row Building	10 53rd Street		1972	Office Building	
Hilton Washington	1919 Connecticut Avenue, N.W. Washington D.C.		1965	Hotel	
Three Penn Center	1515 Market Street; Philadelphia		1958	Office Building	
Two Penn Center	1500 JFK Boulevard; Philadelphia		1958	Office Building	
Blue Hill Plaza	Pearl River, New York			Office Building	

== Gallery ==
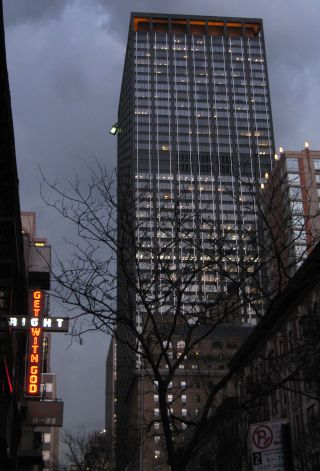
Paramount Plaza

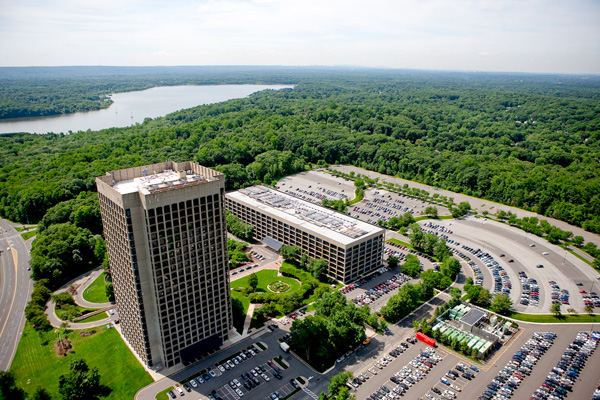
Blue Hill Plaza

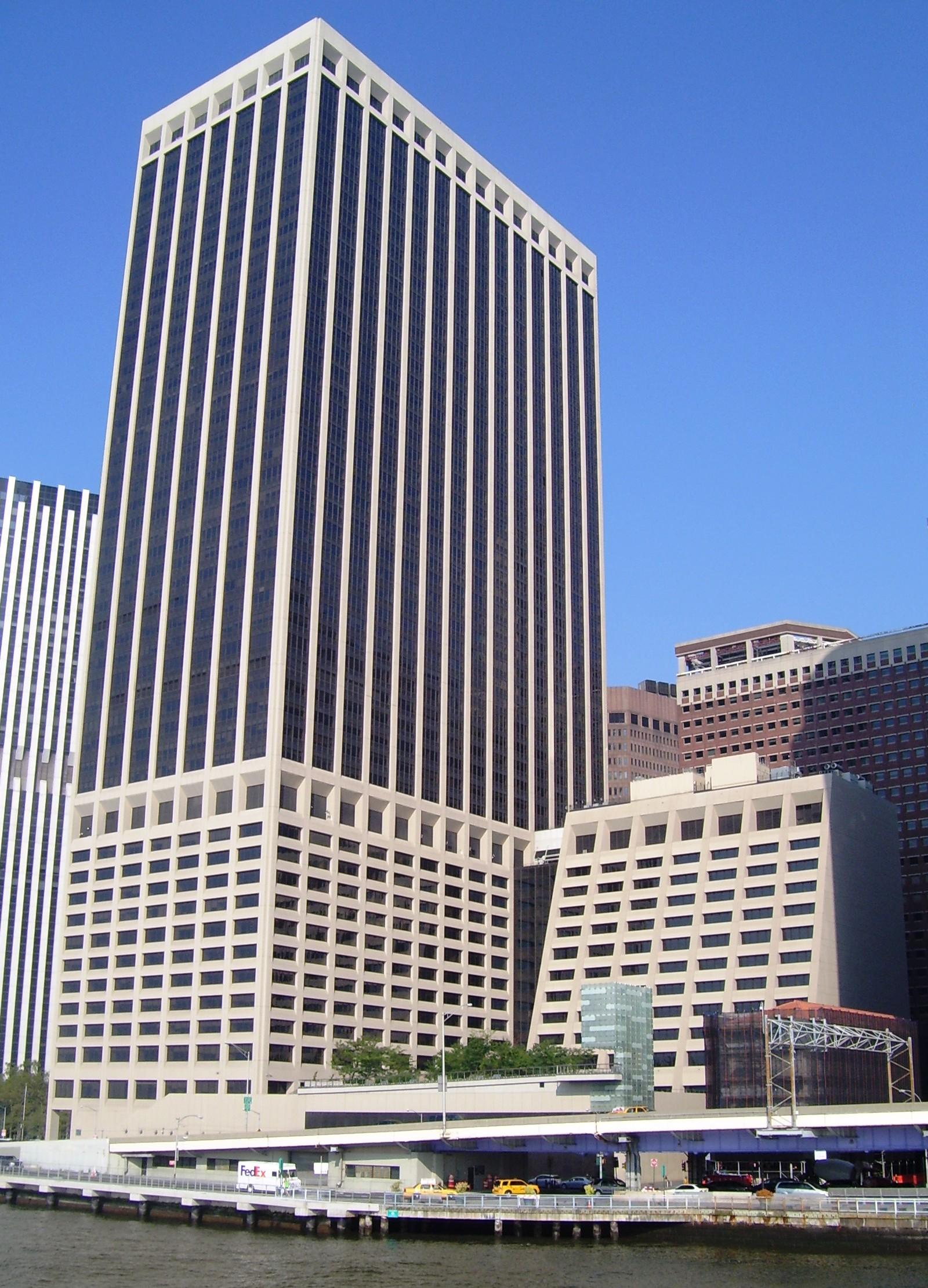
55 Water Street

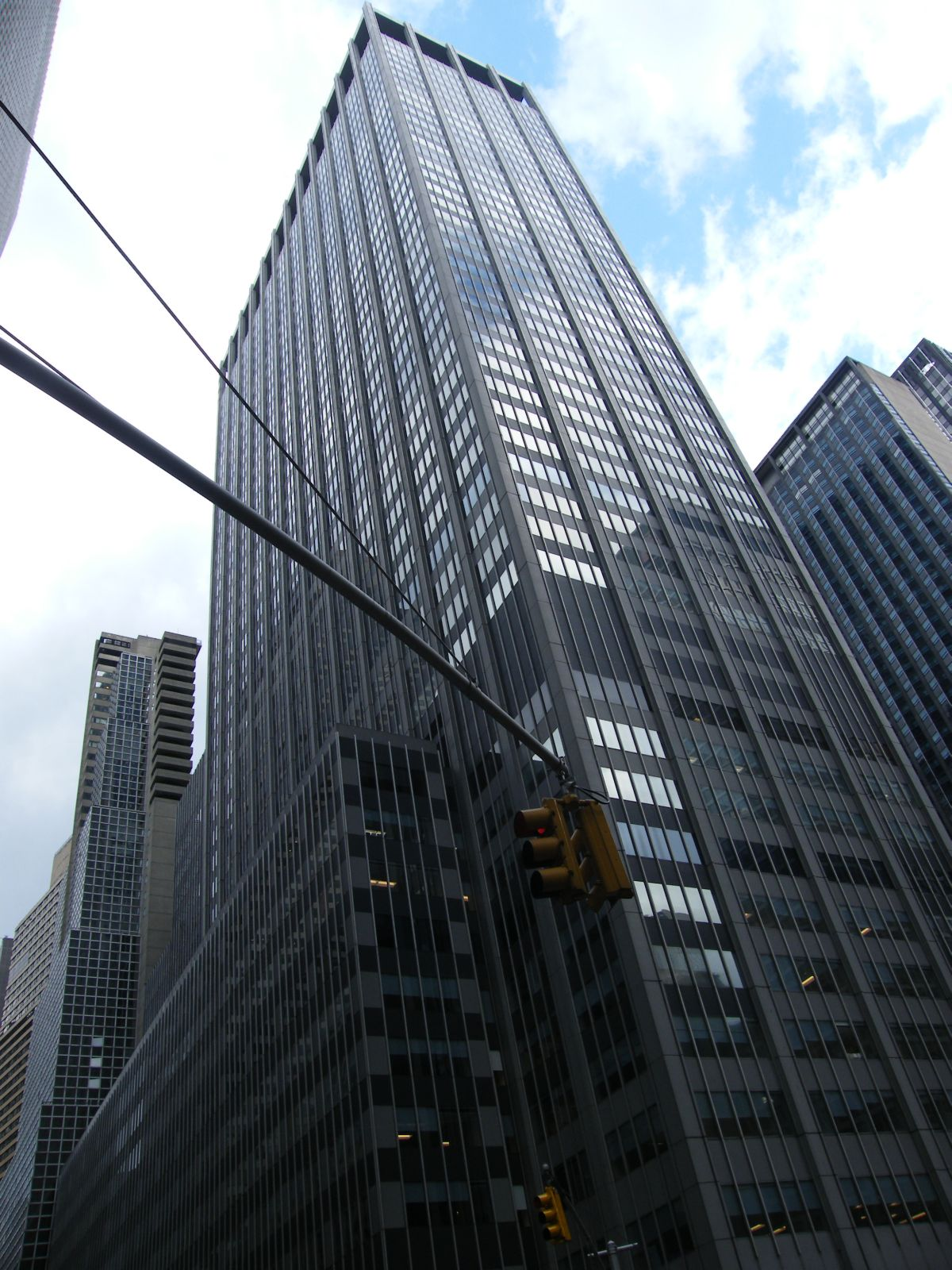
Credit Lyonnais Building

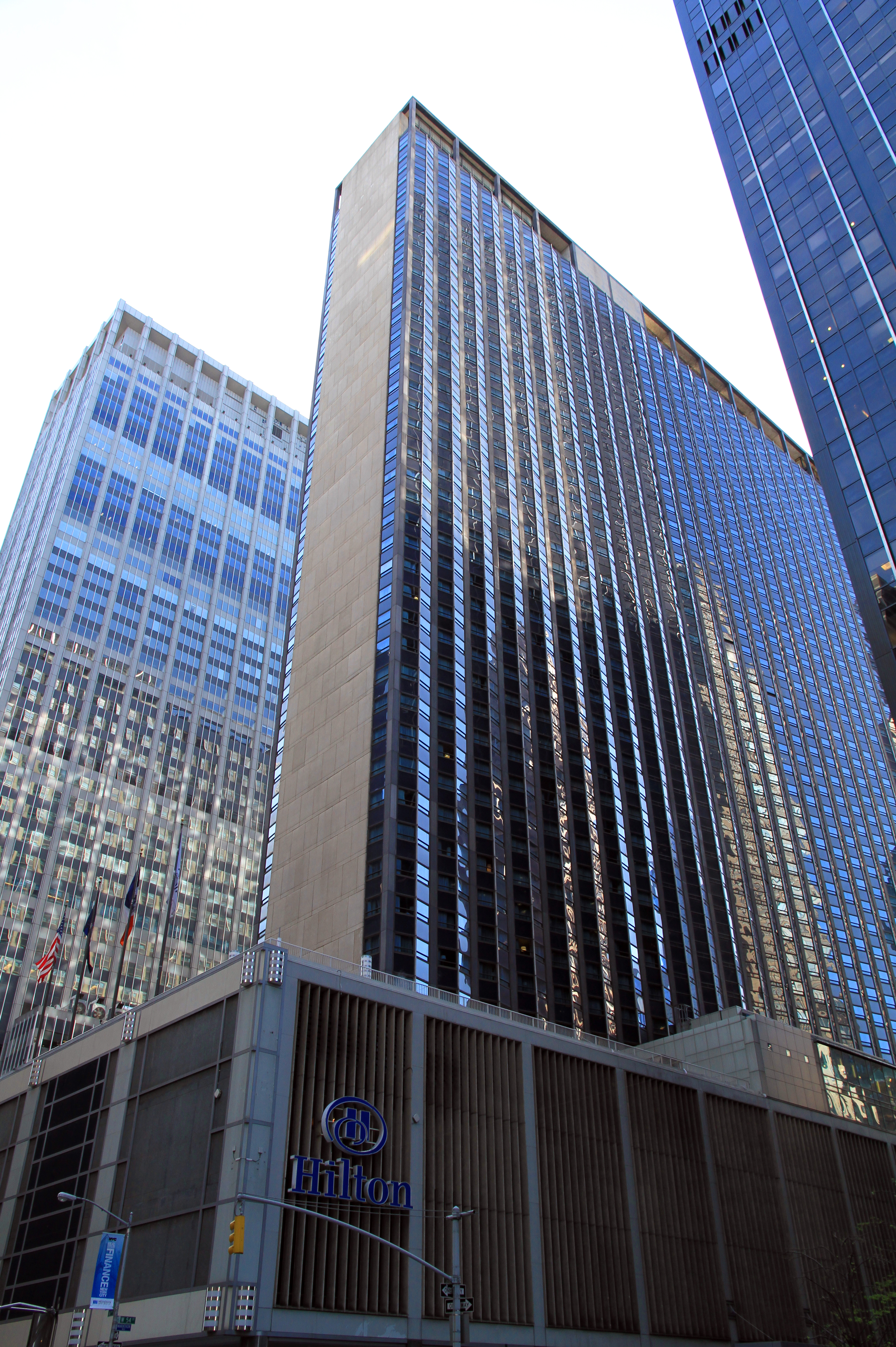
New York Hilton Midtown

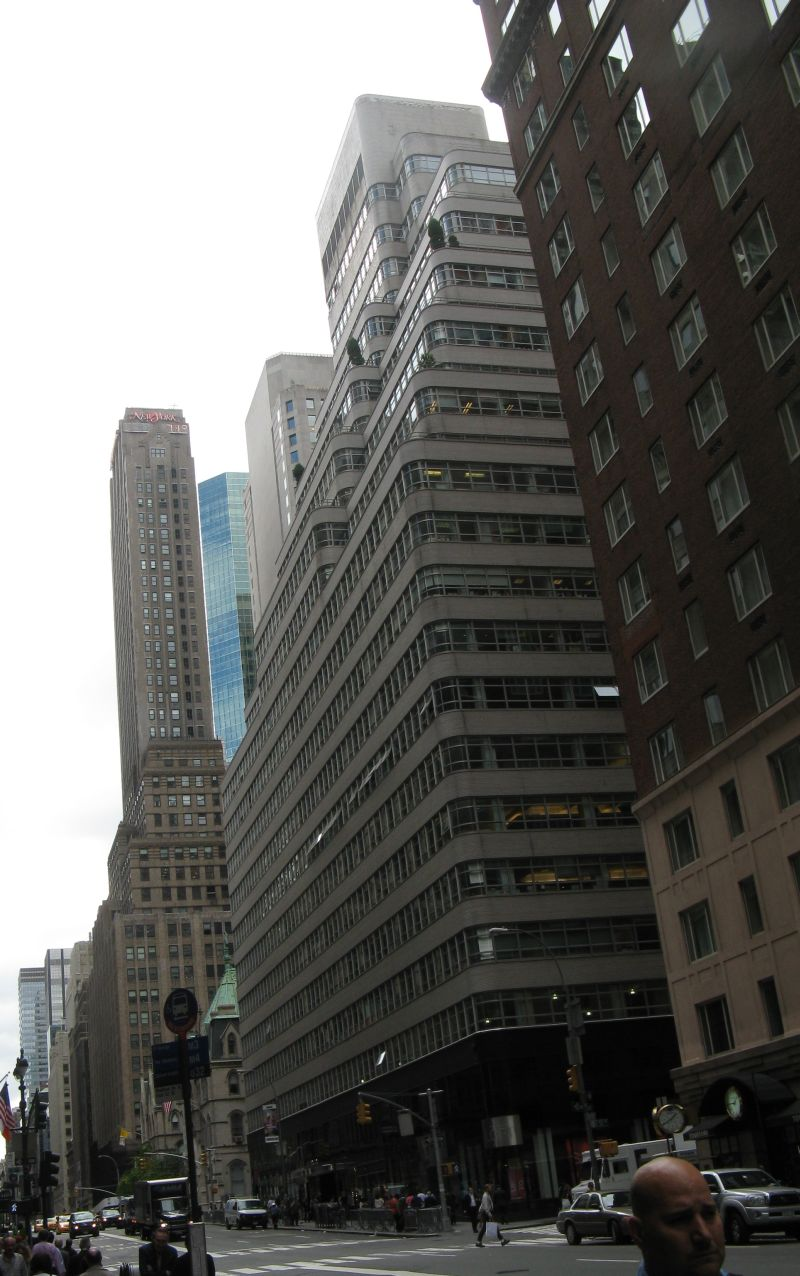
Look Building
