= Blue Hill Plaza =

Plaza in Pearl River, New York, U.S.

Coordinates: 41.04824°N 74.007318°W

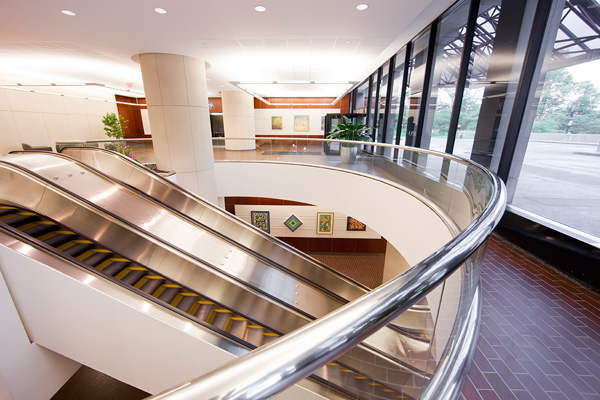
Lobby

Blue Hill Plaza, located in Pearl River, New York, approximately 20 miles north of New York City, is an office complex consisting of a 21-story office tower and an eight-story office building on 90 acres of landscaped and wooded property.

The two buildings comprise nearly 1.2 million square feet of leasable space, about 40 percent of the office space leasing market in Rockland County, with approximately 1,800 people employed by tenants ranging from smaller start-ups to large offices of corporations such as Blue Hill Data Services, Verizon, Orange & Rockland Utilities, Active International, Fujitsu, and Hunter Douglas.

== History ==
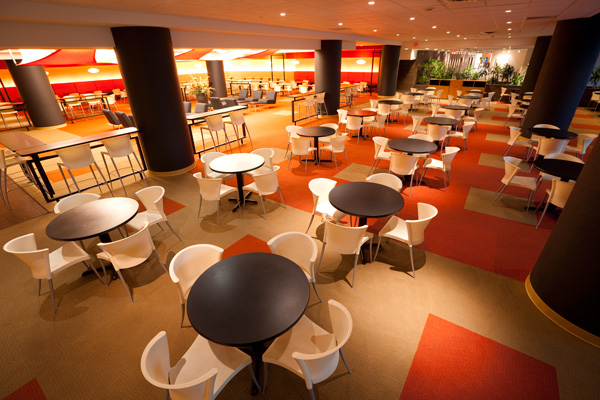
Cafe

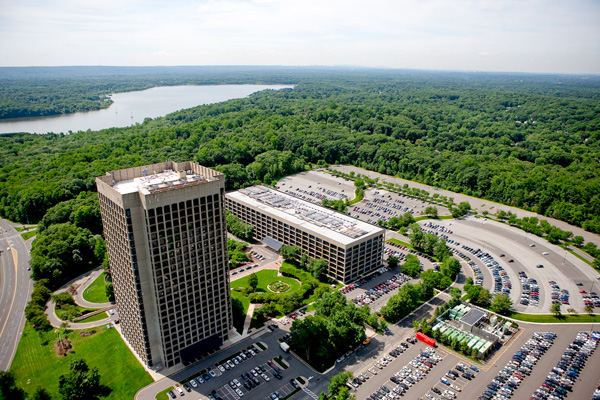
Exterior

Originally planned as the first two buildings of a four-building complex at the northwest end of Lake Tappan, Blue Hill Plaza was designed by notable modernist architectural firm Skidmore, Owings & Merrill. Completed in 1972, it was one of the last projects built by Uris Buildings Corporation of New York City.

Blue Hill Plaza was acquired in 1996 by Glorious Sun Robert Martin LLC, a partnership of Westchester County–based Robert Martin Company and Hong Kong- and Manhattan-based real estate company, Glorious Sun.

== Features ==
Blue Hill Plaza's main lobbies and concourse feature full-height mahogany wall panels, satin aluminum reveals, acoustical tile ceilings with architectural energy-efficient pendant lighting, zolatone-finished columns, and a touchscreen directory. The concourse also features regular art exhibits displaying works from local and national artists.

Building amenities include a health club, childcare center, atrium café, approximately 3,000 parking spaces, hair salon, postal services, banking, and 24/7 building access with on-site security.

== Location ==
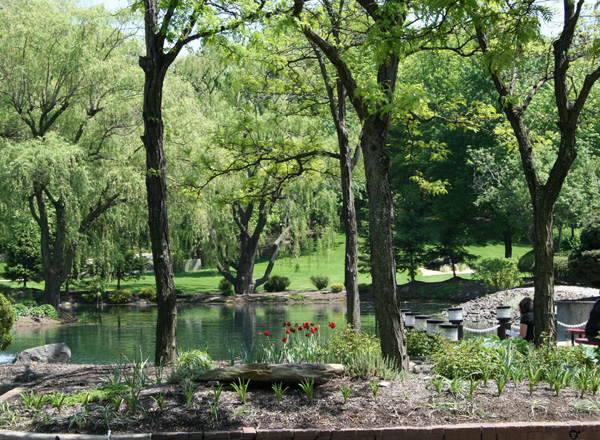
Exterior

Blue Hill Plaza is located at 501 Veterans Memorial Dr, Pearl River, New York, 10965, United States, Rockland County, approximately 20 miles north of the George Washington Bridge to Manhattan. It is directly across from the Hilton Pearl River and the Blue Hill Golf Course, off Veterans Memorial Drive between the Tappan Zee and George Washington bridges, with nearby access to I-80, I-87, I-95, I-287, and the Garden State and Palisades parkways. It borders Bergen County, New Jersey, an NYC suburb and home to numerous corporate headquarters.

== Sustainability ==
In 2008, Blue Hill Plaza received the Rockland Recycles Award, and the Rockland County Distinguished Service Award for its recycling strategies that reduce the amount of waste sent to landfills, while also reducing costs. The recycling program has 100 percent tenant participation and has reduced solid waste disposed by the complex by 40 percent since inception, with an estimated accumulated savings of $250,000. Blue Hill Plaza has diverted over 9,300 tons of cardboard, over 2,100 tons of mixed papers, and over 40 tons of bottles, cans, and plastics.

== Telecom and power ==
Blue Hill Plaza features redundant fiber optic. There is fiber available from two central offices, entering two separate telephone equipment rooms within the site.

There are two 69,000-volt underground feeders from a substation located in Montvale, New Jersey, to an Orange & Rockland substation, dedicated solely to Blue Hill Plaza, located on-site in the parking lot. The two transmission lines from Montvale are encased separately in concrete. From Blue Hill Plaza's on-site substation, which is maintained by Orange & Rockland (an anchor tenant whose corporate offices reside at Blue Hill), there are two 13,200-volt underground feeders that power the substations within the building. In both cases, one feeder can carry the building load. (This does not include the data center power)

There are two 20 MW (Megawatt) transformers. Additional 40MW can become available. The Montvale substation has three separate feeders coming from two locations within Rockland County and one from New Jersey.

In addition, there are two separate transformer banks at the Montvale substation that both can support Blue Hill Plaza's building load if needed. Besides the normal two feeds from the NY ISO, there is also a PJM interconnect that is utilized by O & R to supply their New Jersey–based customers and could be utilized to feed Blue Hill Plaza if necessary.

There is an additional 2,000 amps at 480 volts readily available. There is an additional 8,000 amps that could be available with the installation of additional gear.
