= Ira Millstein =

American antitrust lawyer (1926–2024)

- Born: Ira Martin Millstein; November 8, 1926; New York City, U.S.
- Died: March 13, 2024 (aged 97); Mamaroneck, New York, U.S.
- Education: Columbia University (BS, JD)
- Occupation: Lawyer
- Known for: Longest-practicing partner in big law
- Spouses: Diane Greenberg (m. 1949; died 2010) Susan Marie Frame (m. 2013, divorced)
- Children: 2

Ira Martin Millstein (November 8, 1926 – March 13, 2024) was an American antitrust lawyer, professor, and author. He was a senior partner at Weil, Gotshal & Manges and the longest-practicing partner in big law, according to Reuters.

== Biography ==
Born in Manhattan on November 8, 1926, Millstein graduated from Bronx High School of Science in 1943. He graduated from Columbia School of Engineering and Applied Science in 1947 and received a J.D. degree from Columbia Law School in 1949.

Millstein joined Weil, Gotshal & Manges in 1951 and remained at the firm for the rest of his career, celebrating his 70th anniversary in the firm in 2021. During his tenure at Weil, he counseled the boards of General Motors, General Electric, Westinghouse Electric Corporation, WellChoice, and The Walt Disney Company among others. He also played a role in New York's financial rescue during its fiscal crisis in the 1970s. Wall Street Journal described him as one of Wall Street's most powerful lawyers.

Millstein served as chairman of the antitrust law section of both the American Bar Association as well as the New York State Bar Association. Governor George Pataki appointed him to chair a commission that led to the 2009 Public Authorities Reform Act of New York state. He was a close friend of Ruth Bader Ginsburg, brokering a meeting between Ginsburg and Senator Orrin Hatch that eased her way to a judgeship on the D.C. Circuit.

A proponent of stakeholder capitalism, he helped the Business Roundtable draft its Statement on Corporate Responsibility 1981. He also chaired several OECD initiatives and advisory groups on improving corporate governance standards in member countries. Institutional Investor called him an "éminence grise of corporate governance and prime mover of the OECD governance codes." He promoted the philosophy that corporate power should be distributed beyond top executives, and that independent boards of directors could better hold corporate executives to account and remind companies of their obligations beyond profit-making, including obligations to employees and customers.

Millstein was also the founding chair of The Millstein Center for Global Markets and Corporate Ownership at Columbia Law School, which explores how corporate governance should adapt to changing social norms and pressures. He was a senior associate dean of corporate governance at Yale School of Management.

Millstein was elected a fellow of the American Academy of Arts and Sciences in 1995.

From 1991 to 2000, he was the chairman of the Central Park Conservancy and remained a life trustee until his death. He was also a board member of the National September 11 Memorial & Museum. He was elected chairman of the board of trustees of the Albert Einstein College of Medicine in 2004.

== Personal life ==
In 1949, he married Diane Greenberg, a city planner who helped Greenwich, Connecticut establish its zoning. She died in 2010; the couple had two children. In 2013, Millstein married Susan Marie Frame. They lived in 930 Fifth Avenue, and later divorced. Millstein died in Mamaroneck, New York, on March 13, 2024, at the age of 97.
