= Paramount Plaza =

Office skyscraper in Manhattan, New York

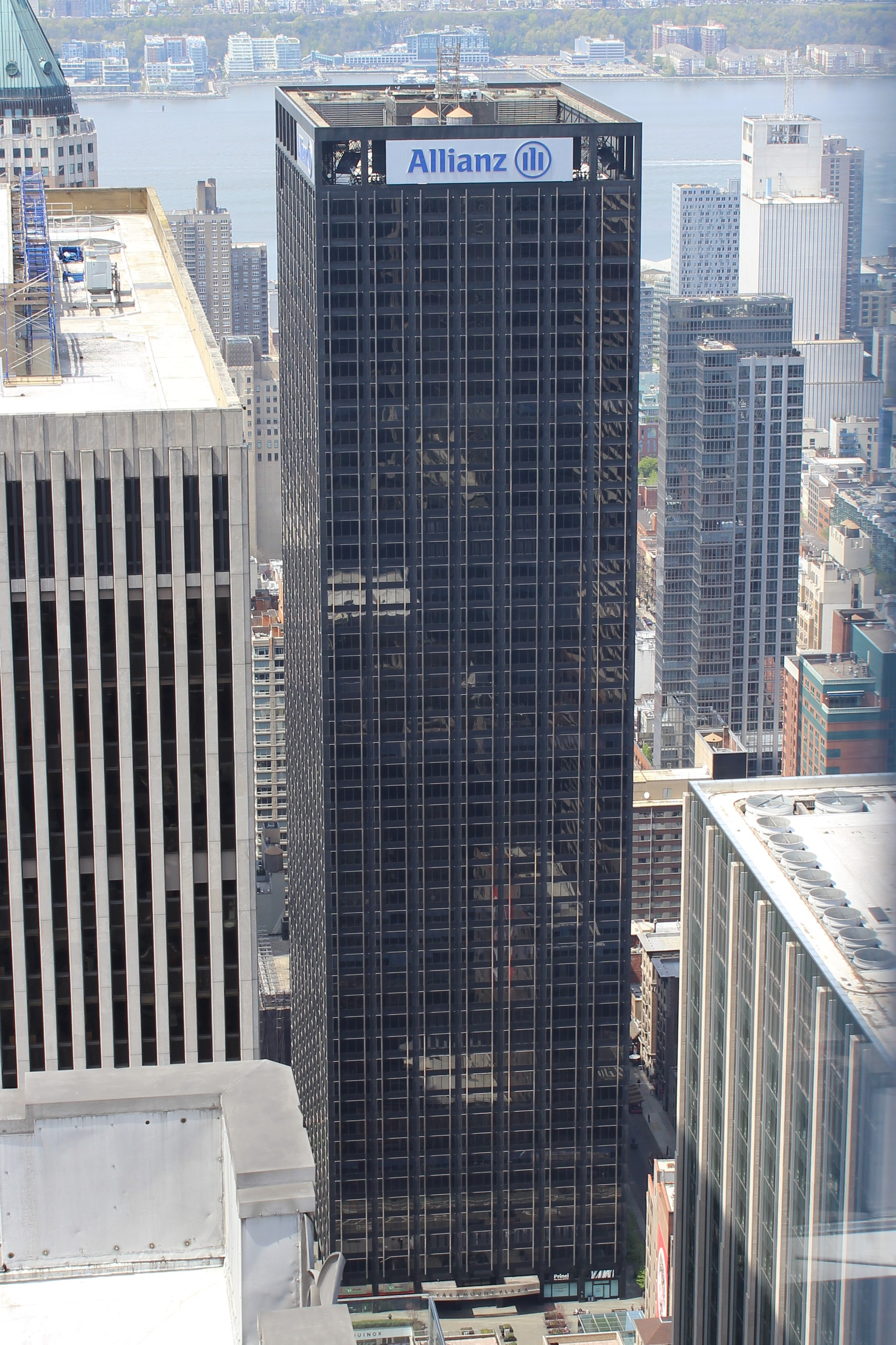

General information
- Status: Completed
- Type: Office
- Architectural style: International Style
- Location: 1633 Broadway, Manhattan, New York, US
- Coordinates: 40°45′43″N 73°59′04″W
- Construction started: Late 1967
- Opening: August 1971
- Owner: Rithm Capital

Height
- Roof: 669 ft (204 m)
- Top floor: 630 ft (190 m)

Technical details
- Floor count: 48
- Floor area: 2,359,148 ft^{2} (219,172.0 m^{2})

Design and construction
- Architect: Emery Roth & Sons
- Developer: Uris Brothers

Paramount Plaza, also 1633 Broadway and formerly the Uris Building, is a 48-story skyscraper in the Midtown Manhattan neighborhood of New York City. Designed by Emery Roth and Sons, the building was developed by the Uris brothers and was renamed for a former owner, the Paramount Group, by 1980. Paramount Plaza occupies a site bounded by Broadway to the east, 51st Street to the north, and 50th Street to the south.

The building has a slab-like massing, rising straight from street level to the roof, 669 ft (204 m) above ground. The facade is covered in dark glass and carries the name of German company Allianz near the roof. There is a sunken plaza on the eastern side of the building, leading to the 50th Street station of the New York City Subway, as well as a pedestrian corridor and driveway under the western side. The driveway and corridor lead to the building's two Broadway theaters: the 1,900-seat Gershwin Theatre on the second floor and the 650-seat Circle in the Square Theatre in the basement.

The Uris Buildings Corporation leased the site of the Capitol Theatre in 1967 and proposed a skyscraper on the site. The two Broadway theaters were included in exchange for additional floor area, and the building opened in August 1971. The building went into foreclosure in May 1974, just two years after it was completed, and the Paramount Group bought a majority ownership stake in the building in 1976. J. C. Penney and Sears initially took up much of the building's space, though the subsequent tenants came from a wider variety of fields, including law and finance. The retail space and plazas have been renovated multiple times during the building's history. The Paramount Group and several banks jointly owned the building until 2011, when Beacon Capital Group acquired a partial ownership stake; Paramount assumed full ownership in 2015, and Rithm Capital acquired Paramount and the building in 2025.

== Site ==
Paramount Plaza is on 1633 Broadway, near Times Square, in the Theater District of Midtown Manhattan in New York City. The land lot takes up the eastern part of the city block bounded by Eighth Avenue to the west, 50th Street to the south, Broadway to the east, and 51st Street to the north. The lot covers 90,000 ft^{2} (8,400 m^{2}), with a frontage of 200 ft (61 m) on Broadway and 450 ft (140 m) on 50th and 51st Streets. Nearby buildings include the Mark Hellinger Theatre (Times Square Church) to the north; the Winter Garden Theatre to the east; The Theater Center, Brill Building, and Ambassador Theatre to the south; and One Worldwide Plaza to the southwest. Since 1998, the section of 50th Street between Eighth Avenue and Broadway has been named Gershwin Way, after brothers and musical writers George and Ira Gershwin.

In the early 20th century, Paramount Plaza's site was occupied by low-rise buildings such as Kerrigan's Cafe. This was replaced by the Capitol Theatre, a movie palace built in 1919. The theater originally had 5,300 seats, but subsequent renovations reduced it to 1,325. The six-story theater building contained offices as well. By the late 1960s, the Capitol was one of Broadway's last major movie palaces, as many of the other movie palaces in the area had been demolished, including the Roxy and the Paramount. Next to the theater was a four-story building with a branch of the New York Bank for Savings.

== Architecture ==
Paramount Plaza, originally known as the Uris Building, was developed by the Uris Buildings Corporation and designed by Emery Roth. The 669 ft-tall (204 m) tower has 48 stories. Paramount Plaza has two Broadway theaters: the Gershwin Theatre on the second floor and the smaller Circle in the Square Theatre in the basement. The building is named after its owner, the Paramount Group; it is not related to media conglomerate Paramount Global, which is headquartered nearby at One Astor Plaza but also has offices at Paramount Plaza.

=== Form and facade ===
Seen from ground level (2026)

Under normal zoning regulations, the maximum floor area ratio (FAR) for any building on the tower's site was 15, but the developers received two bonuses of 20 percent each, bringing the FAR to 21.6. The developers had to include privately owned public spaces at the building's base for the first bonus, and they built new theaters for the second bonus. The Gershwin and Circle in the Square Theatres were built under a 1968 regulation that allowed office buildings to include a legitimate theater in exchange for additional floor area. The inclusion of the theaters allowed the Uris Buildings Corporation to add four more stories than would typically have been allowed.

At the base of Paramount Plaza runs a promenade that connects 50th and 51st Street. The promenade measures 28 ft (8.5 m) tall and 50 ft (15 m) wide, with a terrazzo floor and advertisements on the walls. The promenade also functions as an entrance to the Gershwin and Circle in the Square theaters, and it does not have any stores. There are marquees for the theaters' entrances on both 50th and 51st Streets. A separate, parallel driveway for vehicles is immediately to the west; it can fit three lanes of traffic. There are also 200 parking spaces.

The facade is made of tinted gray glass, separated by vertical aluminum mullions. The name of German financial services company Allianz is affixed to the top of the building on all four sides. Paul Goldberger criticized the building as having brought "nothing more than Third Avenue banality to a part of town that, whatever its social problems, has always been visually spectacular."

==== Plazas ====
The building originally contained two sunken plazas, which counted toward the building's zoning bonuses. Both plazas had ornamental fountains, which were removed in the 1990s. These sunken plazas were among the few such examples in the city; others exist at Citigroup Center, 1221 Avenue of the Americas, and formerly at 1345 Avenue of the Americas and the General Motors Building. The plazas were accompanied by retail spaces that, due to their location, were hard to rent out. A 2000 study of privately owned public spaces in New York City ranked 1633 Broadway's plazas as "circulation" and "hiatus" spaces, which were not as unwelcoming as "marginal" spaces but also did not attract visitors from across the city or the neighborhood.

The southern sunken plaza has an entrance to the 50th Street station of the New York City Subway, served by the 1 train. The theme restaurant Mars 2112 had opened within the northern sunken plaza in November 1998 and closed in January 2012. It contained a UFO-like elevator, a "Mars Bar", a "Space Arcade", and a three-story Crystal Crater. After Mars 2112 closed, a glass retail cube was installed in the northern part of the plaza. The cube, designed by MdeAS Architects, serves as an entrance to a double-level retail space in the basement, which spans 39,588 ft^{2} (3,677.8 m^{2}).

=== Interior ===
According to the New York City Department of City Planning, Paramount Plaza has a gross floor area of 2,438,059 ft^{2} (226,503.1 m^{2}) and is divided into 47 ownership condominiums. Paramount Plaza has 42 elevators and eight escalators. The Uris Building did not renumber its 13th floor out of superstition, as other high-rises did; this led the New York Daily News to call it "the only New York skyscraper to call the 13th floor the 13th floor". Some offices were fitted with additional decorations; for example, accounting firm Touche, Ross, Bailey Smart added curving staircases between two of its five floors.

==== Theaters ====
Paramount Plaza has two Broadway theaters: the Gershwin Theatre and the Circle in the Square Theatre. Paramount Plaza's two venues, along with the Minskoff and American Place theaters, were constructed under the Special Theater District amendment of 1967 as a way to give their respective developers additional floor area. The Gershwin opened in 1972 as the Uris Theatre and contained 1,900 seats. Located at the second floor, the Gershwin was designed by Ralph Alswang in what was described as an Art Nouveau style. Escalators and a staircase lead from the ground floor to the Gershwin Theater's second-floor lobby, which contains the American Theater Hall of Fame. The Gershwin's seats are spread across two levels: an orchestra and a smaller mezzanine. The stage was designed with a flexible layout and could be disassembled or extended forward. The Gershwin was the first commercial theater in the U.S. to have a completely automated rigging system. The Nederlander Organization operates the theater.

The Circle in the Square Theatre contains 650 seats and is in the building's basement. It was designed by Allen Sayles, with a lighting system designed by Jules Fisher. The Circle operates its own venue, which was originally known as the Circle in the Square–Joseph E. Levine Theatre. The space was originally meant as an off-Broadway house with fewer than 500 seats, but the Circle's artistic director Theodore Mann and its managing director Paul Libin increased the capacity by relocating columns and replaced steps with ramps. The top of the auditorium contains soundproof panels, which minimized noise from police horses when the theater opened. The Circle contains a thrust stage, with seats surrounding it on three sides. It is one of two Broadway houses with a thrust stage; the other is Lincoln Center's Vivian Beaumont Theater. Because of the stage's unconventional design, theatrical critics negatively reviewed it, while directors had difficulty staging productions there.

== History ==
After World War II, development of theaters around Times Square stalled, and the area began to evolve into a business district. In 1966, the year before plans for the Uris Building were announced, companies had signed leases for 7×10^{6} ft^{2} (650,000 m^{2}) of office space in Manhattan, the highest level in several years. The amount of office space being developed at the time was not sufficient to meet demand. The Uris Buildings Corporation bought an option in April 1967 to acquire the Capitol Theatre and the land around it from the theater's owner, Loews Cineplex Entertainment. At the time, Uris was considering replacing the theater with an office building but had made no definite plans.

=== Development ===
In September 1967, Uris leased the Capitol site for 100 years and announced it would build an office tower and a Broadway theater on the site of the Capitol Theatre. The building was to have 1.65×10^{6} ft^{2} (153,000 m^{2}) across 51 stories, with a plaza on the eastern 60 percent of the site. The Broadway theater would have 1,500 to 2,000 seats. In October 1967, the New York City Planning Commission (CPC) proposed the Special Theater District Zoning Amendment, which gave zoning bonuses to office-building developers who included theaters. The proposed legislation would directly allow theaters in One Astor Plaza and the Uris Building, which would be the first completely new Broadway theaters since the Mark Hellinger Theatre was completed in 1930. (Note: The Hellinger was initially a movie theater and did not become a Broadway venue until 1949. The Lunt-Fontanne Theatre and Palace Theatre were converted from movies to Broadway theaters afterward, but both theater buildings are physically older than the Hellinger. The last venue to be built as a Broadway theater, operating continuously in that capacity, was the Ethel Barrymore Theatre, completed in 1928.) The CPC approved the theater amendment that November, and the New York City Board of Estimate gave final approval to the proposal the next month.

The Uris Buildings Corporation agreed in February 1968 to build a second theater, the Circle in the Square Theatre, in the basement upon the CPC's request. The new theater was originally supposed to be an experimental theater with 300 to 375 seats, but this was then increased to 650 seats. In April 1968, the CPC scheduled a public hearing to determine whether the Astor and Uris theater permits should be approved. Six parties testified in favor; the Shubert Organization, the largest operator of Broadway theaters, was the only dissenting speaker. The CPC approved the theaters over the Shuberts' objections, as did the Board of Estimate. The Capitol was closed on September 16, 1968, to make way for what is now Paramount Plaza. That month, Uris made a tentative deal with James M. Nederlander and Gerard Oestricher to operate the Uris Theatre, the larger of the building's two theaters. To fund the building's construction, Uris borrowed $62 million from a consortium of banks led by Irving Trust.

Much of the space had been rented by November 1969. Among the early tenants with several floors of space were accounting firm Touche, Ross, Bailey Smart; automotive appliance manufacturer Bendix International; and the New York Telephone Company. Even so, the inclusion of theaters inside the Uris Building raised construction costs, even as office tenants were scarce. By 1970, a combined 5×10^{6} ft^{2} (460,000 m^{2}) of office space was being developed along Broadway in Midtown, much of which stood vacant due to a slowdown in office leasing. That December, the city's Department of Air Resources issued summonses to several contractors at the Uris Building after the department found that contractors were spraying asbestos fireproofing in violation of environmental laws. Sears, Roebuck and Company sought to lease much of the building's remaining office space, but the deal initially failed in mid-1971.

=== Opening and early years ===
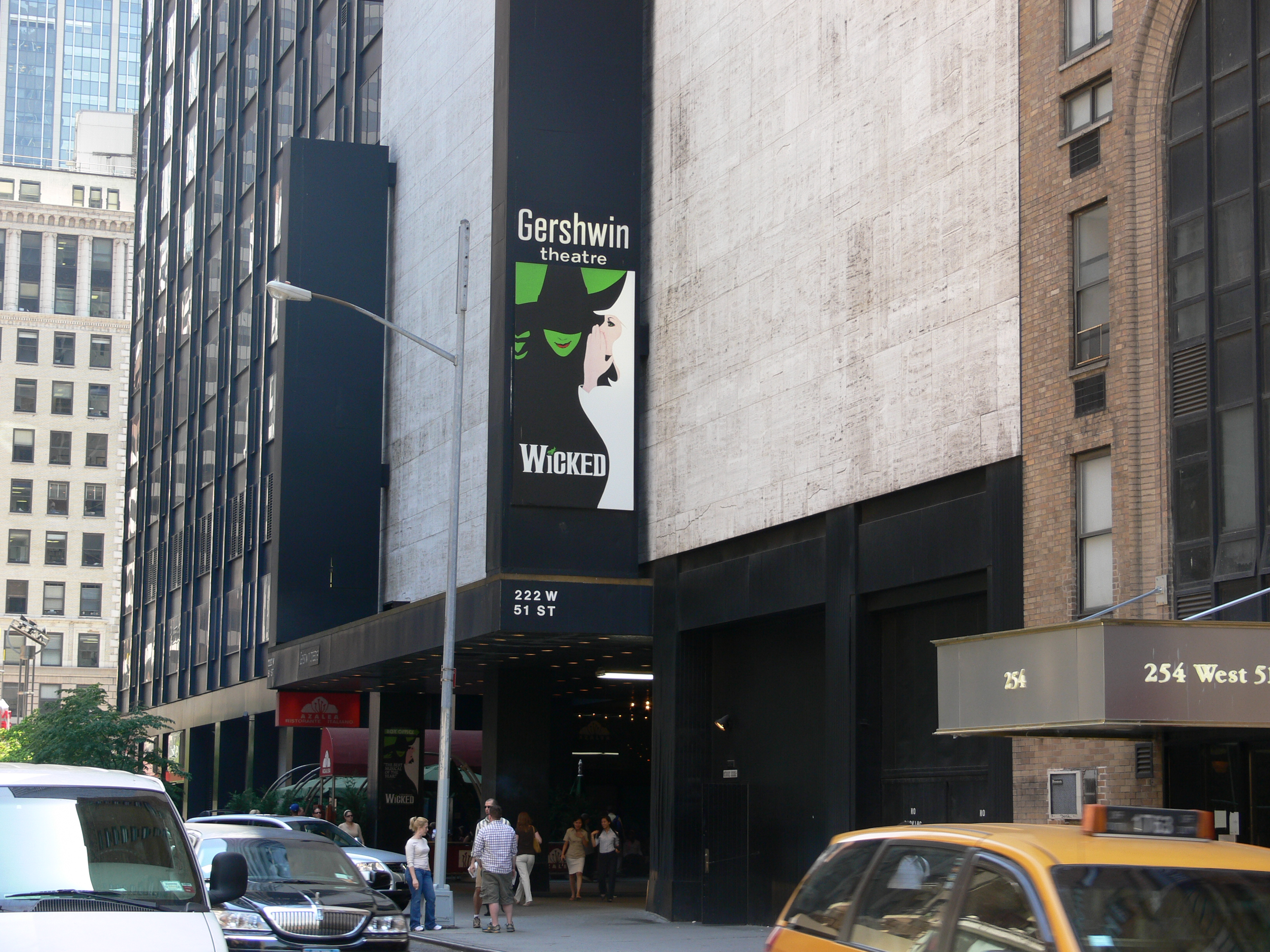
Gershwin Theatre

The building officially opened in August 1971. A theatrical hall of fame for the Uris Theatre was announced in March 1972, as the building was being completed. The Circle in the Square Theatre in the basement opened for inspection on October 2, 1972, and had its first performance on November 15. The Uris Theatre on the building's second floor opened on November 19 of that year. In one of the city's largest office transactions in several years, Sears, Roebuck and Company leased eleven stories for its sales division in January 1973, moving in the next year. City officials praised the lease, which was expanded in November 1973 to 15 stories, as part of a revitalization of the Times Square neighborhood. Meanwhile, after Percy Uris had died in 1971, his brother Harold began negotiating to sell off all his company's assets, including 1633 Broadway. By late 1973, National Kinney Corporation had bought a majority stake in the Uris properties.

The Uris Buildings Corporation failed to pay the construction loan, which was due at the end of December 1973 and was extended multiple times. Uris decided not to extend the loan because it would not provide additional funding to cover operating and carrying costs. At that time, 12.5 percent of office space in Manhattan was vacant, (Note: 30×10^{6} ft^{2} (2,800,000 m^{2}) of space was vacant, out of 250×10^{6} ft^{2} (23,000,000 m^{2}) total.) higher than the 5-percent rate that the real-estate community generally accepted. The vacancy rate at the Uris Building was 30 percent. Irving Trust and the other lenders launched foreclosure proceedings in March 1974, the first time in a decade that a new office building in New York City had been foreclosed upon. Two months later, the lenders paid nearly $69 million for the bankrupted building. Harold Uris had opposed the foreclosure proceeding, saying: "Hell would freeze over before I would have let a Uris building go under like that."

After J. C. Penney leased 450,000 ft^{2} (42,000 m^{2}) of space that August, only five percent of the space was still vacant. However, Newsday reported in December 1975 that the building had a 10 percent vacancy rate, even though its owners had spent millions of dollars on renovations. Other tenants at the time included the City University of New York. Irving Trust sold the building in October 1976 to a private investment group. The buyer, Metropolitan Realty Investments, paid $80 million; it represented the Otto family of Germany, which operated in the United States under the Paramount Group name. Sears announced in 1978 that it would relocate most of its 2,000 employees at the Uris Building to the Sears Tower in Chicago. The next year, the United States Postal Service announced it would move a regional headquarters into part of the former Sears space, and James Talcott Factors Inc. also leased some space.

=== 1980s to 2000s ===
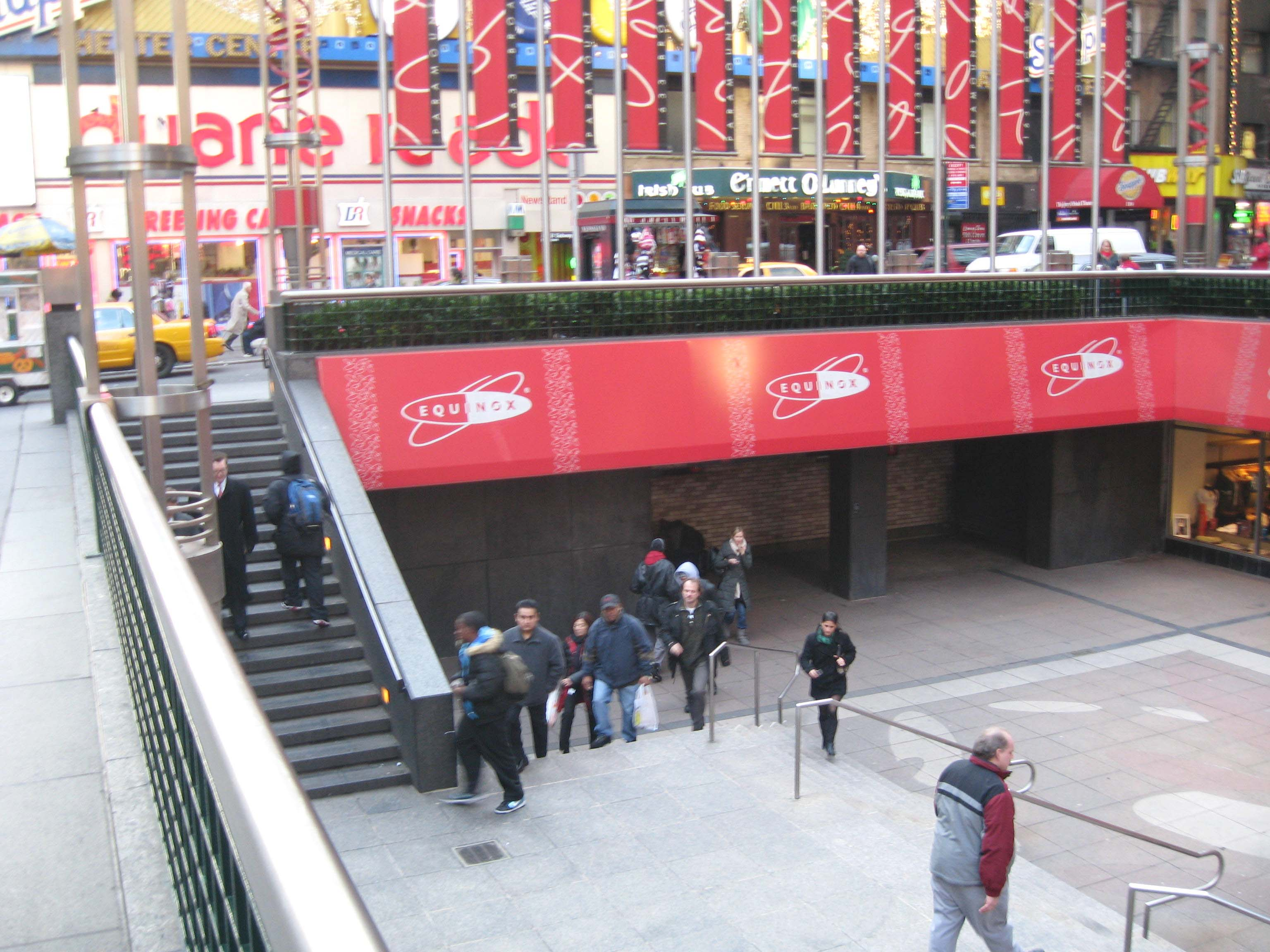
The sunken plaza with subway entrance

By 1980, the structure was known as Paramount Plaza; the city government classified the new name as a vanity address. At that time, Sears had moved its remaining employees out of the building. Two years later, Lüchow's restaurant leased space in one of the sunken plazas. Among the building's other office tenants during the decade were New American Library and the Federal Mediation and Conciliation Service. In 1987, J. C. Penney indicated that it intended to move all of its New York City employees to Dallas, freeing up a large amount of office space at Paramount Plaza; the relocation was completed by 1994. Landscape architect Thomas Balsley redesigned the building's public plaza in the late 1980s, as the plaza had been fairly unsuccessful despite the presence of retail tenants. Balsley added landscaping and benches to the ground-level portion of the plaza, and he added fountains, staircases, and new lighting and floor surfaces to the sunken plazas. The redesign took more than two years.

The Rodgers & Hammerstein Organization and the Really Useful Group leased space in Paramount Plaza in 1990. At the time, the building had few tenants in the music industry, even though many music-related companies had historically been headquartered nearby in the Brill Building. Deloitte, one of the Big Four accounting firms, moved its global headquarters there after the 1993 World Trade Center bombing. It subsequently subleased 500,000 ft^{2} (46,000 m^{2}) to Paramount Communications' parent company Viacom. Other tenants during that decade included financial firm Morgan Stanley, cable TV network Showtime, the New York Power Authority, law firm Brobeck, Phleger & Harrison, and the American Management Association. In 1999, Nickelodeon opened an animation studio for Nick Jr programs in the building.

Paramount Group hired a consultant in late 1995 to study uses for the building's retail spaces. Subsequently, the stores were renovated and leased to three tenants in the late 1990s. Mars 2112 leased the northern plaza, Cosi Sandwiches leased a ground-floor storefront, and fitness club Equinox took space in the concourse and sub-concourse. Law firm Kasowitz, Benson, Torres & Friedman leased space at 1633 Broadway for its global headquarters in 2000, and financial firm FleetBoston also rented three stories. Other tenants included the Bank of America, which had a trading floor there. During that decade, Paramount Plaza contained a business center shared by several small tenants. By the late 2000s, Paramount Group was marketing some of the building's office space for short-term lease.

=== 2010s to present ===
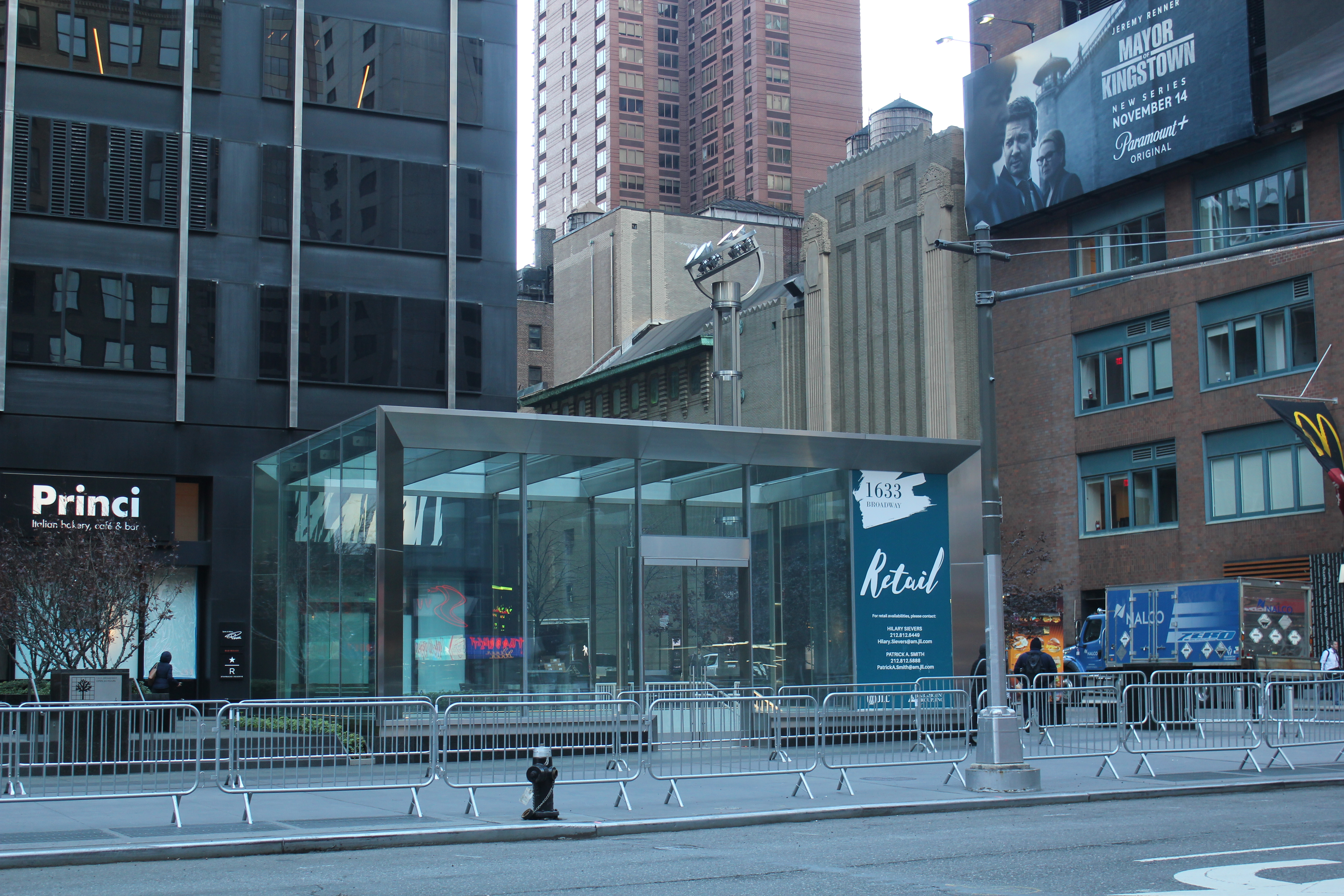
Ground-level retail cube

In 2010, financial services company Allianz announced it would move its North American headquarters to 1633 Broadway, receiving the right to place its name atop the building's roof. Industrial and Commercial Bank of China also leased space that year, as did Carnegie Hall.

In August 2011, Paramount Group partnered with Beacon Capital Group to acquire the 49% stake owned by Merrill/Bank of America and Morgan Stanley. The deal valued the building at $2 billion. Paramount increased its ownership stake from 51 to 75 percent, with Beacon owning the remaining 25 percent. Paramount then marketed a partial ownership stake in the building. Additionally, the owners hired Phillips Group in 2011 to renovate the lobby. Music conglomerate Warner Music Group leased six floors in 2013, and Kasowitz Benson Torres renewed its lease the same year.

Paramount continued to own the structure in partnership with Beacon until 2015, when Paramount bought Beacon's 25 percent stake for $478.3 million. The same year, toy store FAO Schwarz was negotiating to lease some retail space in 1633 Broadway, but the deal failed. Paramount then announced plans to replace the northern sunken plaza with a glass retail cube. In late 2015, Landesbank Baden-Württemberg gave Paramount a $1 billion loan for the building, which was finalized the next February. Deloitte announced in early 2016 that it would vacate a 212,000 ft^{2} (19,700 m^{2}) section of the building. Several office tenants signed leases in the late 2010s, including the Clinton Foundation, newspaper company Gannett, database company MongoDB, and investment manager New Mountain Capital.

The building was refinanced in November 2019 for $1.25 billion, a move that raised $140 million for Paramount. The next April, Paramount indicated it would enter a joint venture with an unnamed investor to sell a 10 percent stake in 1633 Broadway. The sale was completed the next month at a price of $240 million. This provided extra cash for the firm amid a decline in office leasing due to the COVID-19 pandemic in New York City. In February 2022, Taiwanese restaurant chain Din Tai Fung leased the retail space in Paramount Plaza's glass cube; however, the restaurant's opening was not announced until 2024. Amid fears that many of Paramount Plaza's tenants could leave or pay lower rents once their leases expired, Fitch Ratings reduced the credit rating of Paramount Plaza's mortgage in 2024. By the end of that year, Paramount Plaza was 95% occupied, and Paramount Group had spent $230 million on building upgrades to date since 2010. Paramount Global, one of the tenants, began looking to sublease 253,000 square feet (23,500 m^{2}) at Paramount Plaza in 2025 after downsizing its workforce. Paramount Group was acquired by Rithm Capital in December 2025, and Rithm took over ownership of the building.

== Tenants ==
As of October 31, 2019, the building was 98.4% leased to tenants including:

- Floors 2–3: Bleacher Report
- Floors 4 and 7–11: Warner Music Group
- Floor 6: MTV Satellite Radio
- Floors 13-17: Showtime Networks
- Floors 18 and 28: Industrial and Commercial Bank of China
- Floors 19-22: Kasowitz Benson Torres
- Floors 26, 27, 29, 30, and 33: Morgan Stanley
- Floors 37–38: MongoDB Inc.
- Floors 39–40: Charter Communications (and brand Spectrum)
- Floor 41: Virtu Financial
- Floors 42–46: Allianz (and subsidiary PIMCO)
- Floors 47–48: New Mountain Capital

== See also ==
- List of buildings and structures on Broadway in Manhattan
