= Mars 2112 =

Defunct theme restaurant in New York City

Coordinates: 40°45′43″N 73°59′2.6″W

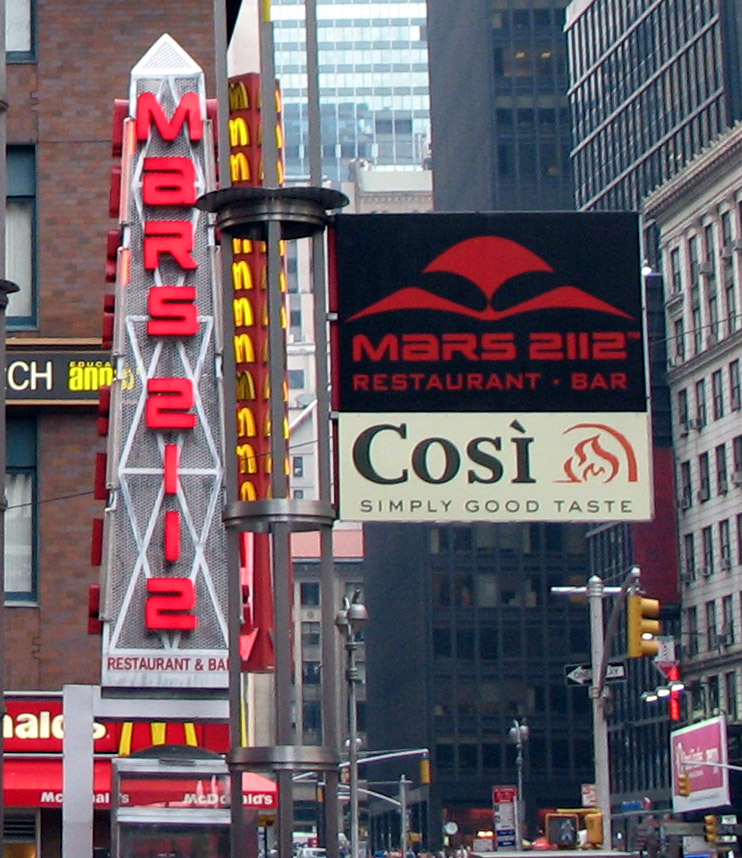
Street-level sign for Mars 2112 near Times Square

Mars 2112 (pronounced "Mars twenty-one twelve") was a theme restaurant in the Times Square district of New York City from 1998 to 2012. It was the largest restaurant with a Mars and space travel theme at the time it opened in November 1998, with 33,000 sq ft (3,100 m^{2}) of floor space.

Mars 2112's founder and principal stockholder was Paschal M. Phelan, an Irish businessman who previously worked in the European beef industry. Phelan said Mars 2112 was built around the event of traveling to Mars rather than a simple theme, and stated that the mission was "to convince people that they are on Mars".

== Location ==
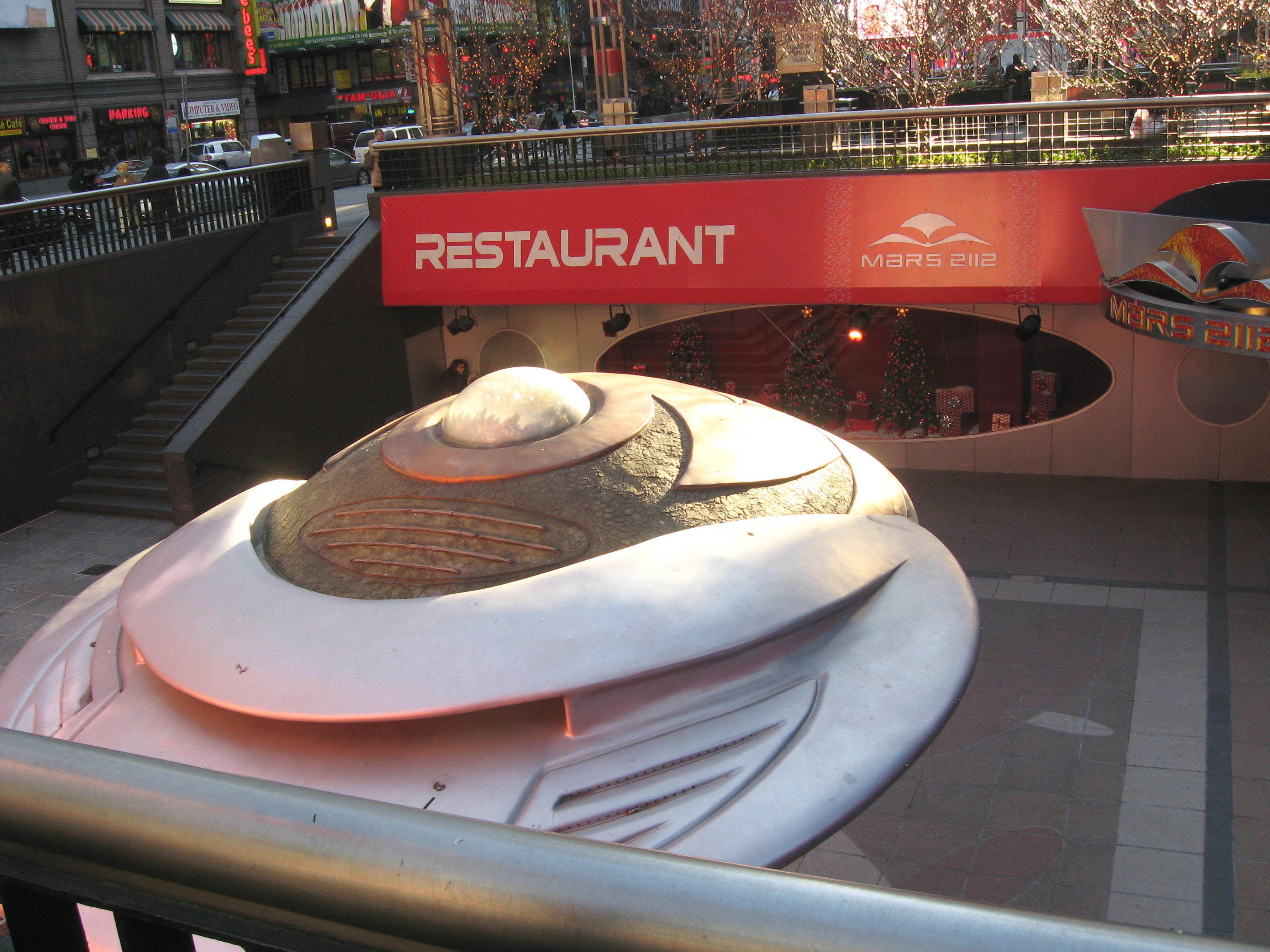
Flying saucer

Mars 2112 was located at 1633 Broadway, situated on a sunken courtyard in front of the Paramount Plaza, at Broadway and 51st Street, beneath the Hachette Book Group offices. It seated 400 guests and had 33,000 sq ft (3,100 m^{2}) of floor space. A UFO-like elevator took patrons to the dining tier, where the "Mars Bar" and "Cyber Street arcade" were also located. Perhaps the most notable feature was "Crystal Crater", which served as the dining area. It was three stories high, and decorated as an imaginary Mars underground landscape, with industrial walkways over what appeared to be lava and windows to computer-generated Martian landscapes. Waiters dressed in futuristic costumes, and "Martians" with names and backstories walked through the dining floor. Menu items had space-themed names such as "Nebula Chili Nachos". After dining, patrons passed through two doorways where a "teleporter" took them back to the main floor and the gift shop. The restaurant's signature attraction was its two 30-seat space flight simulators, together worth about $1.5 million. The aesthetic was compared to the original 1960s Star Trek.

== Operations ==
In 2000, two men were shot after an argument began at a party hosted at Mars 2112 by WQHT Hot 97 FM.

Mars 2112 was attended by former US president Bill Clinton and his niece. Brad Pitt attended Mars 2112 with his son Maddox Jolie-Pitt. In 2011, Shaquille O'Neal was turned away from a party hosted at Mars 2112 while wearing a sweatshirt and sneakers, which failed to meet the party's dress code.

The New York City restaurant closed in January 2012 and was auctioned off by Eliot B. Millman and Michael Amodeo auction companies. It had previously filed for bankruptcy twice, in 2001 and again in late 2007.

Founder Paschal Phelan opened another Mars 2112 restaurant at Woodfield Mall in Schaumburg, Illinois, on October 3, 2000. It closed in November 2001 for no publicly stated reason.
