= Harold Uris =

American businessman (1905–1982)

- Born: May 26, 1905
- Died: March 28, 1982 (aged 76)
- Education: B.S. Cornell University
- Occupation: real estate developer
- Known for: co-founder of Uris Buildings Corporation
- Spouse: Ruth Chinitz
- Children: Judith Haber; Susan Halpern; Linda Sanger; Jane Nye
- Parent(s): Stacey Copland; Harris Uris
- Family: Percy Uris (brother)

Harold D. Uris (May 26, 1905 – March 28, 1982) was an American real estate entrepreneur and philanthropist who co-founded with his brother Percy Uris, the Uris Buildings Corporation.

== Biography ==
Uris was born to a Jewish family, the son of Sadie (née Copland) and Harris Uris, founder of an ornamental ironwork factory. After earning a civil engineering degree from Cornell University in 1925, Harold joined his brother, Percy, who had a 1920 business degree from Columbia University, and their father in developing residential real estate. After WWII, the brothers focused on commercial development, with Harold handling the construction and Percy the financial aspects. Claiming to be the largest private developers in New York City, the Uris Brothers primarily used architect Emery Roth. In 1960, they created Uris Buildings Corp. as a real estate investment company. One of the last buildings the brothers built together was the Uris Building housing the Uris Theater. Soon after Percy's death in 1971, Harold sold the corporation to Kinney National Company for $115 million, but the assets were soon foreclosed in NY's real estate recession.

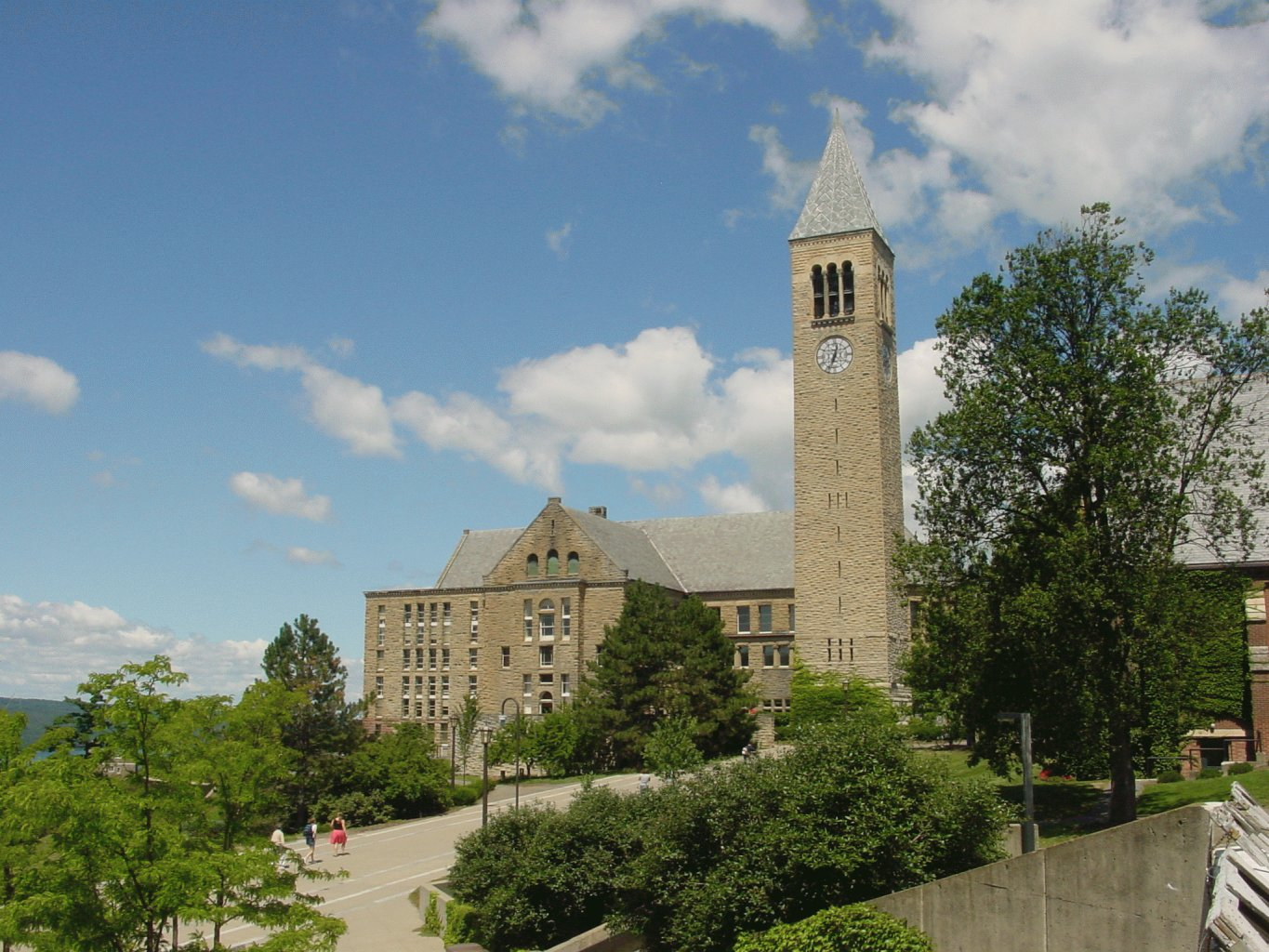
Uris Library at Cornell University

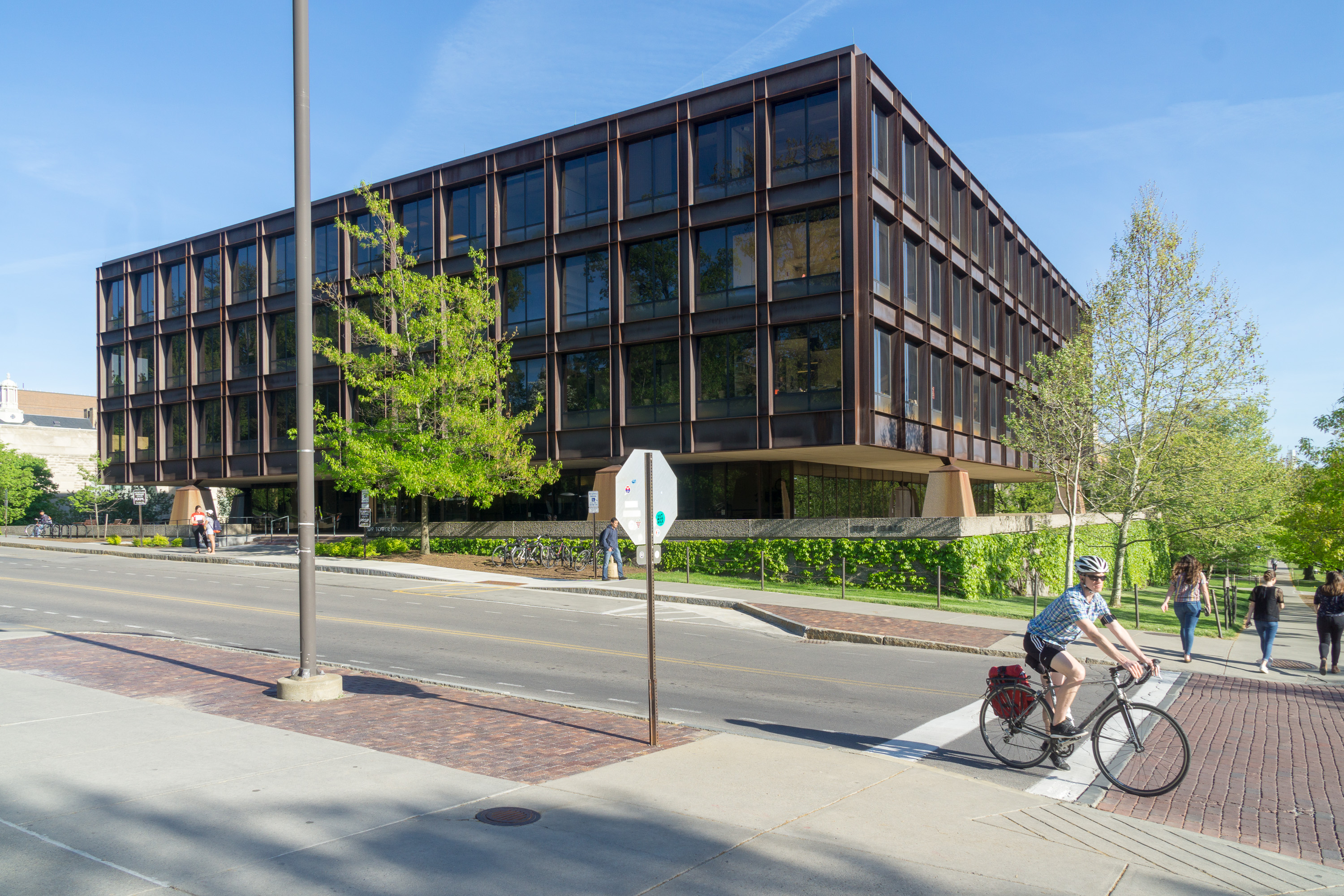
Uris Hall at Cornell University

Harold and Percy Uris created the Uris Brothers Foundation in 1956, and gave money to Cornell, Columbia, and the Metropolitan Museum of Art. Harold Uris was a Cornell trustee from 1967 to 1972, and was an influential member of Cornell's Buildings and Properties Committee. Two buildings bear his name on Cornell's Ithaca campus. A social sciences building built in 1972 was named for Uris and his brother Percy. Earlier in 1962, the old University Library building was renamed Uris Library. In 1998, the Uris Brothers Foundation was dissolved after donating all its remaining assets: $10 million to the Metropolitan Museum of Art, $10 million to the Central Park Conservancy, $3 million to the New York Public Library, $3 million to Thirteen/WNET, $2.5 million to Carnegie Hall, and $1.5 million to the New School for Social Research.

In 1983, Uris donated $10 million to establish the Ruth and Harold D. Uris Center of Education at the Metropolitan Museum of Art.

== Personal life ==
Uris was married to Ruth Chinitz; they had four daughters, Judith Haber, Susan Halpern, Linda Sanger and Jane Nye. He died on March 28, 1982, at the age 76, at St. Mary's Hospital in Palm Beach, Florida. Services were held at Temple Emanu-El in Manhattan.
