= Percy Uris =

- Born: August 19, 1899
- Died: November 20, 1971 (aged 72)
- Education: B.S. Columbia Business School
- Occupation: real estate developer
- Known for: co-founder of Uris Buildings Corporation
- Parent(s): Stacey Copland; Harris Uris
- Family: Harold Uris (brother); Mattie Freeman (Sister)

Percy Uris (August 19, 1899 – November 20, 1971) was an American real estate entrepreneur and philanthropist who co-founded with his brother Harold Uris, the Uris Buildings Corporation.

== Biography ==
Uris was born to a Jewish family, the son of Sadie (née Copland) and Harris Uris, an immigrant from Russia and founder of an ornamental ironwork factory. After earning a B.S. from Columbia Business School in 1920, Percy joined his brother, Harold, and their father in developing residential real estate. After WWII, the brothers focused on commercial development, with Harold handling the construction and Percy the financial aspects. Claiming to be the largest private developers in New York City, the Uris Brothers primarily used architect Emery Roth. In 1960, they created Uris Buildings Corp. as a real estate investment company. One of the last buildings the brothers built together was the Uris Building housing the Uris Theater. Soon after Percy's death in 1971, Harold sold the corporation to Kinney National Company for $115 million, but the assets were soon foreclosed in NY's real estate recession.

In 1956, the brothers created the Uris Brothers Foundation donating generously to Cornell, Columbia, and the Metropolitan Museum of Art. A social sciences building built in 1972 was named for Uris and his brother Harold. In 1962, the main University Library building was renamed Uris Library. In 1998, the Uris Brothers Foundation was dissolved after donating all its remaining assets: $10 million to the Metropolitan Museum of Art, $10 million to the Central Park Conservancy, $3 million to the New York Public Library, $3 million to Thirteen/WNET, $2.5 million to Carnegie Hall, and $1.5 million to the New School for Social Research.

Uris was married and had two daughters: Mrs. Allan Levitt and Mrs. Peter Krulewitch. He died on November 20, 1971, in Palm Beach, Florida.
