= List of international foreign trips made by Barham Salih =

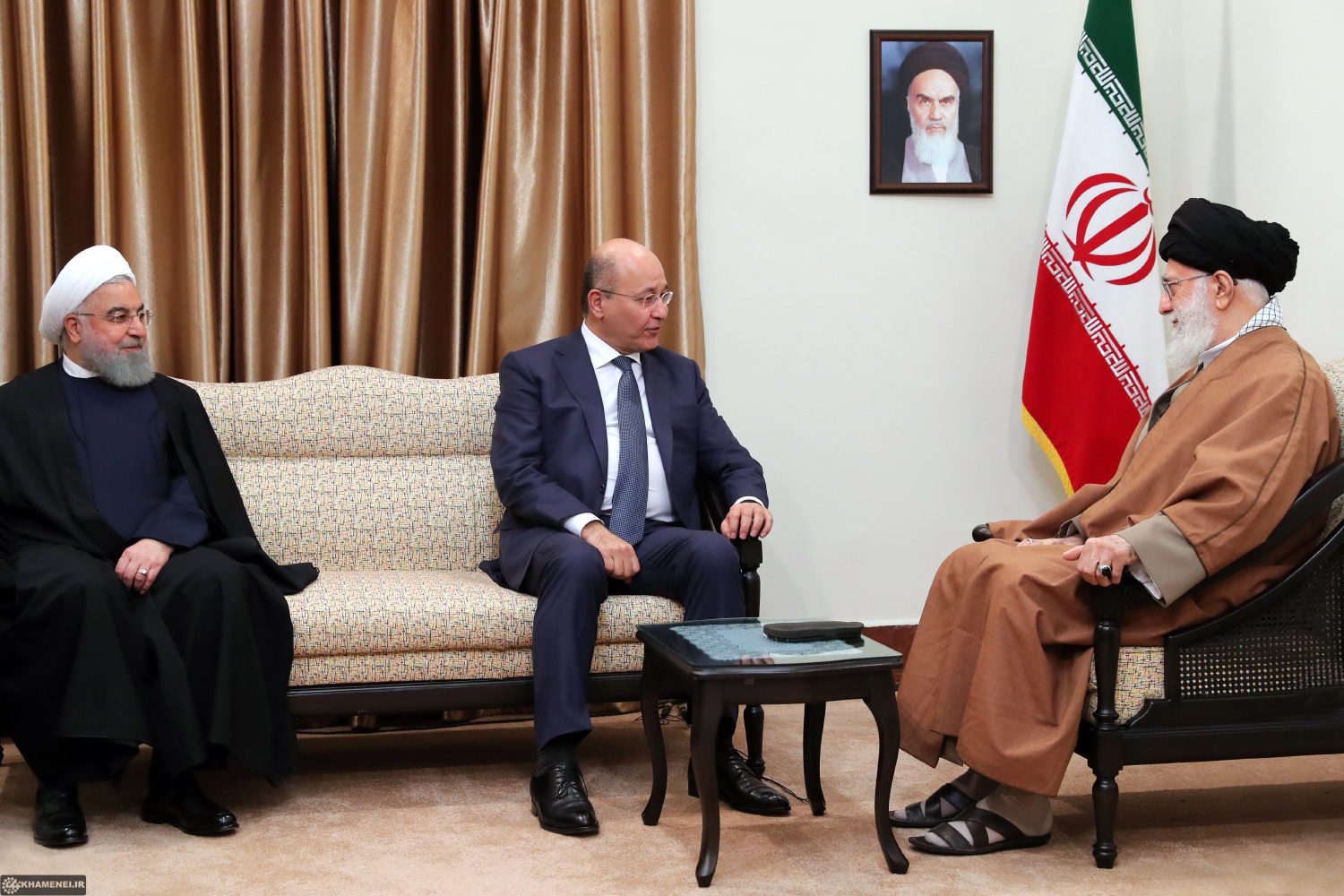
Salih with Supreme Leader of Iran Ali Khamenei and Iranian President Hassan Rouhani in Tehran.

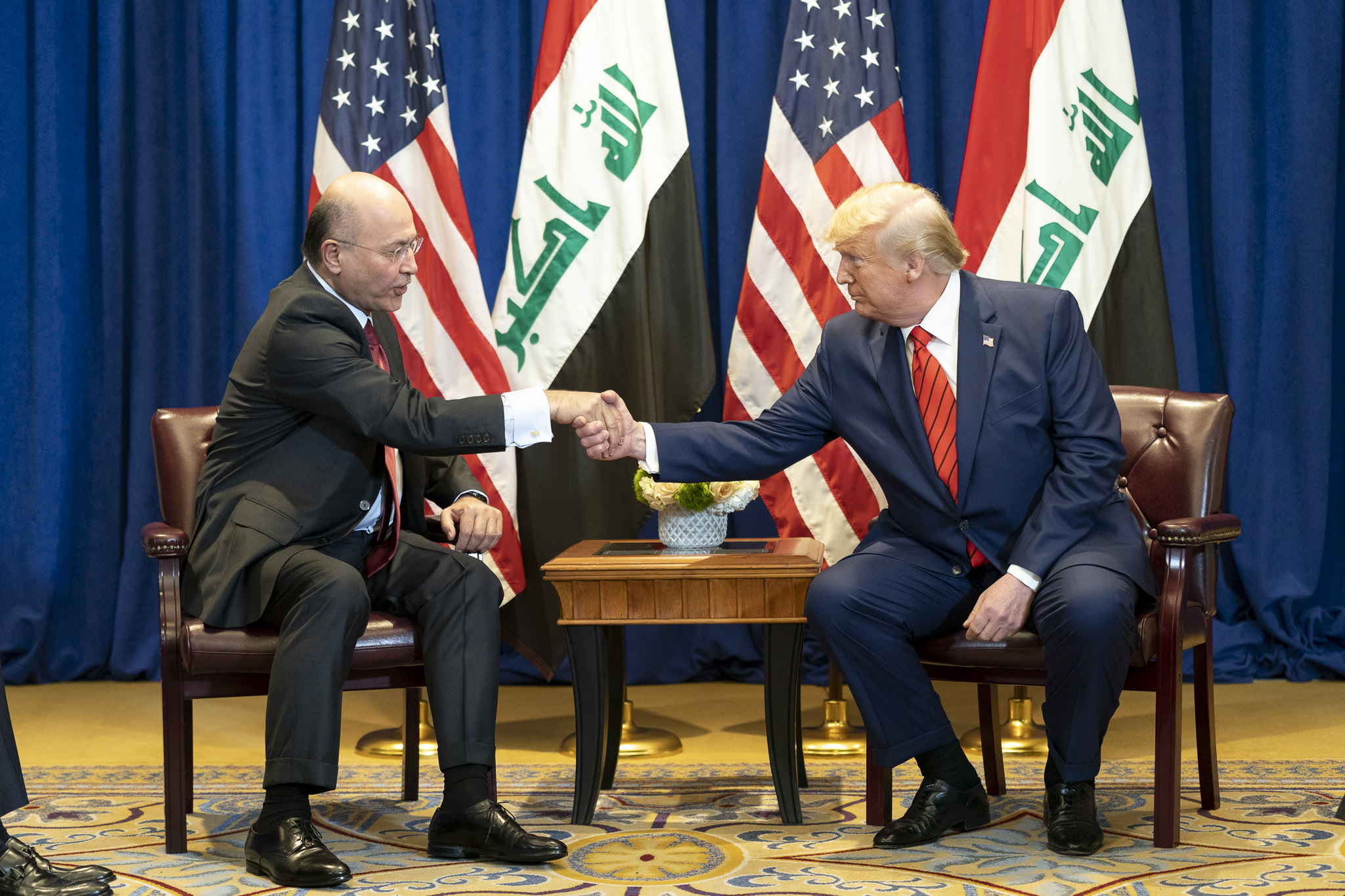
Salih with President Donald Trump at the Lotte New York Palace in New York City, 24 September 2019.

The following is an ongoing list of international foreign trips made by Barham Salih, who currently holds the office of President of Iraq. Assuming this post in October 2018, he has conducted many state visits to different foreign countries, mainly in the Middle East.

== Summary ==
=== 2018 ===
Country	Location	Date	Host	Type of Visit
Kuwait	Kuwait City	November 11–12	Sabah Al-Ahmad Al-Jaber Al-Sabah	Official Visit
UAE	Abu Dhabi	November 12–13	Crown Prince Mohammed bin Zayed Al Nahyan	Official Visit
Jordan	Amman	November 15–16	King Abdullah II	Official Visit
Iran	Tehran	November 16–18	President Hassan Rouhani	Official Visit
Saudi Arabia	Riyadh	November 18	King Salman	Official Visit
Italy	Rome	November 18	President Sergio Mattarella	Official Visit. Met with Sergey Lavrov
Holy See	Vatican City	November 24	Pope Francis	Official Visit

=== 2019 ===
Country	Location	Date	Host	Type of Visit
Turkey	Ankara	January 3	Recep Tayyip Erdogan	Official Visit
Qatar	Doha	January 9-10	Sheikh Tamim Bin Hamad Al Thani	
France	Paris	February 25	Emmanuel Macron	
Jordan	Amman	May 23	King Abdullah II	Working Visit
Turkey	Ankara	May 29	Recep Tayyip Erdogan	Private Visit
UK	London	June 25	Elizabeth II	
United Nations	New York City	September 25	António Guterres	

=== 2020 ===
Country	Location	Date	Host	Type of Visit
Italy	Rome	January 24	President Sergio Mattarella	Working Visit.
Holy See	Vatican City	January 24	Pope Francis	Working Visit

=== 2021 ===
Country	Location	Date	Host	Type of Visit
Iran	Tehran	August 5	President Ebrahim Raisi	Inauguration of Ebrahim Raisi.
