= Villard Houses =

Historic buildings in Manhattan, New York

- U.S. National Register of Historic Places
- New York State Register of Historic Places
- New York City Landmark
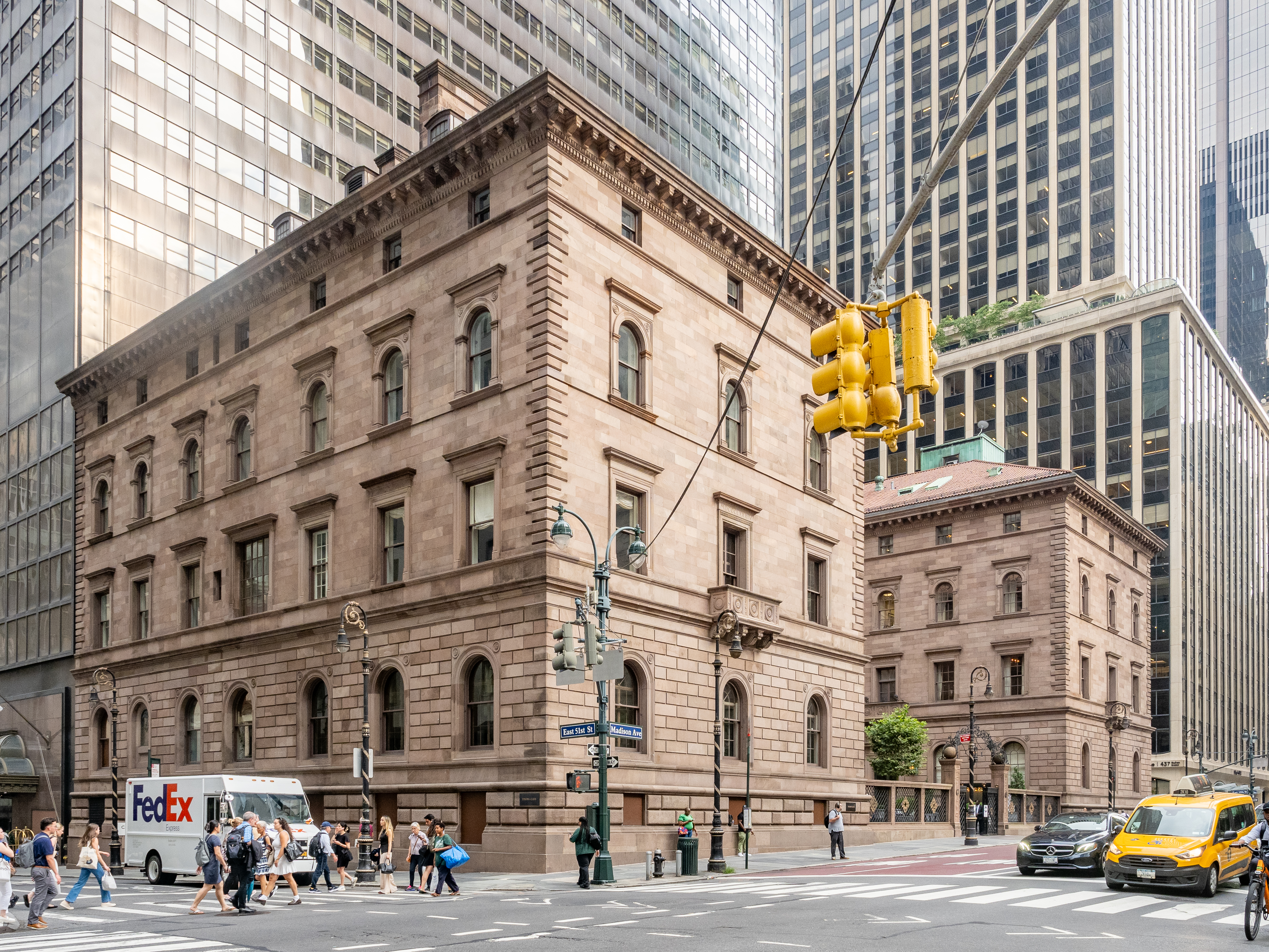
- The houses, seen from the corner of Madison Avenue and 51st Street
- Interactive map of Villard Houses
- Location: 29 1/2 50th Street, 24–26 East 51st Street, and 451–457 Madison Avenue; Manhattan, New York, U.S.
- Coordinates: 40°45′29″N 73°58′31″W
- Built: 1882–1884
- Architect: Joseph Morrill Wells of McKim, Mead & White
- Architectural style: Renaissance Revival
- NRHP reference No.: 75001210
- NYSRHP No.: 06101.004572
- NYCL No.: 0268–0270

Significant dates
- Added to NRHP: September 2, 1975
- Designated NYSRHP: June 23, 1980
- Designated NYCL: September 30, 1968

The Villard Houses are a set of former residences on Madison Avenue, between 50th and 51st streets, in the Midtown Manhattan neighborhood of New York City, New York, United States. Designed by the architect Joseph Morrill Wells of McKim, Mead & White in the Renaissance Revival style, the residences were erected in 1884 for Henry Villard, the president of the Northern Pacific Railway. Since 1980, the houses have been part of the Lotte New York Palace Hotel (formerly Helmsley Palace Hotel), the main tower of which is to the east.

The building comprises six residences in a U-shaped plan, located at 29 1/2 50th Street, 24–26 East 51st Street, and 451–457 Madison Avenue. Wings to the north, east, and south surround a courtyard facing the avenue. The facade is made of brownstone, and each house consists of a raised basement, three stories, and an attic. Among the artists who worked on the interiors were art-glass manufacturer John La Farge, sculptor Augustus Saint-Gaudens, and painter Maitland Armstrong. Some of the more elaborate spaces, such as the Gold Room, the dining room, and the reception area in the south wing of the complex, still exist.

Villard bought the land in 1881 and commissioned the houses shortly before he went bankrupt. The residences were resold multiple times through the mid-20th century; the Fahnestock and Reid families owned five of the houses by the 1920s. The Roman Catholic Archdiocese of New York acquired much of the complex in the late 1940s, and it bought the northernmost residence at 457 Madison Avenue from Random House in 1971. The houses were restored when the Helmsley Palace Hotel was built from 1978 to 1980. The north wing was converted into an office for the Municipal Art Society, a preservation group, which occupied that space until 2010. Other parts of the interior were converted into event spaces for the hotel.

When the houses were completed, wealthy New Yorkers considered the buildings' design to be restrained compared with other mansions. The houses continued to receive architectural commentary through the 20th century, with observers such as Ada Louise Huxtable praising their design. The residences are New York City designated landmarks and are listed on the National Register of Historic Places.

== Site ==
The Villard Houses are in the Midtown Manhattan neighborhood of New York City, New York, United States, located on a site bounded by Madison Avenue to the west, 51st Street to the north, and 50th Street to the south. The residences are spread across two land lots. The rectangular land lot under the northern residence, at 457 Madison Avenue, has a frontage of 60 feet (18 m) on Madison Avenue and 74 feet (23 m) on 51st Street, and it covers about 4,485 square feet (416.7 m^{2}). The rest of the residences occupy part of a second land lot, which is shared with the Lotte New York Palace Hotel immediately to the east. The L-shaped lot has a frontage of 140 feet (43 m) on Madison Avenue and 200 feet (61 m) on 50th Street, and it covers 35,720 square feet (3,318 m^{2}). Nearby buildings include Olympic Tower, 11 East 51st Street, and 488 Madison Avenue to the northwest; St. Patrick's Cathedral to the west; and 18 East 50th Street and the Swiss Bank Tower to the southwest.

Villard Houses
1 South wing: 451 Madison Avenue (29 1/2 50th Street)
2 Central wing: 453 Madison Avenue
3 Central wing: 455 Madison Avenue
4 North wing: 457 Madison Avenue
5 North wing: 24 East 51st Street
6 North wing: 26 East 51st Street
7 Hotel tower

== History ==
=== Development ===
==== Planning ====
The houses were commissioned by Henry Villard, the president of the Northern Pacific Railway. After immigrating to the U.S. as a young man, Villard worked as a journalist and later took over several railroad companies in the 1870s. Villard wanted a building that resembled palaces in his native Bavaria. In April 1881, Villard bought a plot on the east side of Madison Avenue between 50th and 51st streets from the trustees of St. Patrick's Cathedral. The site was 200 feet (61 m) wide and either 151 feet (46 m) or 175 feet (53 m) deep. The Park Avenue railroad line ran directly east of the site, and there was also an orphanage to the north, St. Patrick's Cathedral to the west, and the Columbia College campus to the south. The land itself was occupied by the Church of St. John the Evangelist, which had been abandoned in 1879 and subsequently sold to a colonel named J. Augustus Page. Villard paid $260,000 (equivalent to about $7.4 million in 2024) for the land after St. Patrick's trustees declined a higher offer from another potential buyer who wanted to build an entertainment venue there.

Charles Follen McKim was hired to design a group of houses for Villard, arranged around a courtyard with a fountain and garden. Villard had previously hired the firm to design other buildings; in addition, McKim was one of Villard's family friends, and Villard's brother-in-law was married to McKim's sister. The Real Estate Record and Guide speculated that the mansions were arranged to "secure privacy and get rid of tramps, and to live in a quiet and secluded way", similar to dwellings in the suburbs of London and Paris. Villard also wanted a landscaped garden east of the houses, but this was never added to the official plans. He planned to move into one of the houses and rent the remaining residences to his friends. The writer Elizabeth Hawes wrote that, by doing so, Villard wanted to create "a pleasant neighborhood unit" that positively impacted future urban developments. A later New York Times article said that Villard had planned the entire complex as his own residence, but he was obligated to split it into multiple smaller units when his wealth declined.

Details of the design were revised through late 1881, when McKim temporarily left New York City to work on a railroad terminal for Villard in Portland, Oregon. The job was reassigned to Stanford White, who, after a short time, left the city to visit his brother in New Mexico. White reassigned his projects to various junior architects in his office, and Joseph Morrill Wells agreed to take over the design of the Villard Houses from the firm's remaining partner, William Rutherford Mead. According to the historian Leland M. Roth, one account had it that McKim and White had "immediately [became] advocates of Renaissance classicism" upon returning and seeing the updated plans. Roth wrote that McKim and White were probably responsible for the general style of the facade, although Wells was definitely responsible for the architectural details. Villard wanted to use brownstone rather than another material such as limestone. White's original architectural drawings for the project no longer exist.

==== Early construction ====
Workers were excavating the northeast corner of Madison Avenue and 50th Street by November 1881. The contractors drilled down until they had exposed the underlying layer of bedrock, since Villard did not want to damage Columbia College's buildings nearby. In May 1882, McKim, Mead & White submitted plans to the Bureau of Buildings for a four-story residence at 451 Madison Avenue (on the corner with 50th Street), measuring 100 by 60 feet (30 by 18 m). This was to be the first of a series of six residences surrounding a courtyard. Work on 451 Madison Avenue began on May 4 of that year.

By late 1882, the houses' exteriors had been completed, and parts of the interiors were being furnished. One residence on the north wing, the unit with a doorway facing the courtyard, was to have been occupied by Villard's adviser, Horace White, but this did not happen. Villard obtained a mortgage loan for the property from the Manhattan Savings Institution in late 1882. One of the three wings had been built by mid-1883, and Villard's legal adviser Artemas H. Holmes indicated in an April 1883 letter that the foundations for 453 and 455 Madison Avenue were being built.

McKim, Mead & White designed the interiors of all of the residences as well. At the time, most residences were laid out by interior designers and decorators rather than architecture firms. The interiors of each residence were designed to fit the tastes of the respective tenants. The Villard Houses cost $1 million without furnishings (equivalent to about $29.32 million in 2024), and the decoration cost another $250,000 (about $7.33 million in 2024). Stanford White was proud of the project, recalling in 1896 that it was "the beginning of any good work that we may have done". The residences were New York City's first houses designed in the Roman High Renaissance style.

==== Villard bankruptcy ====
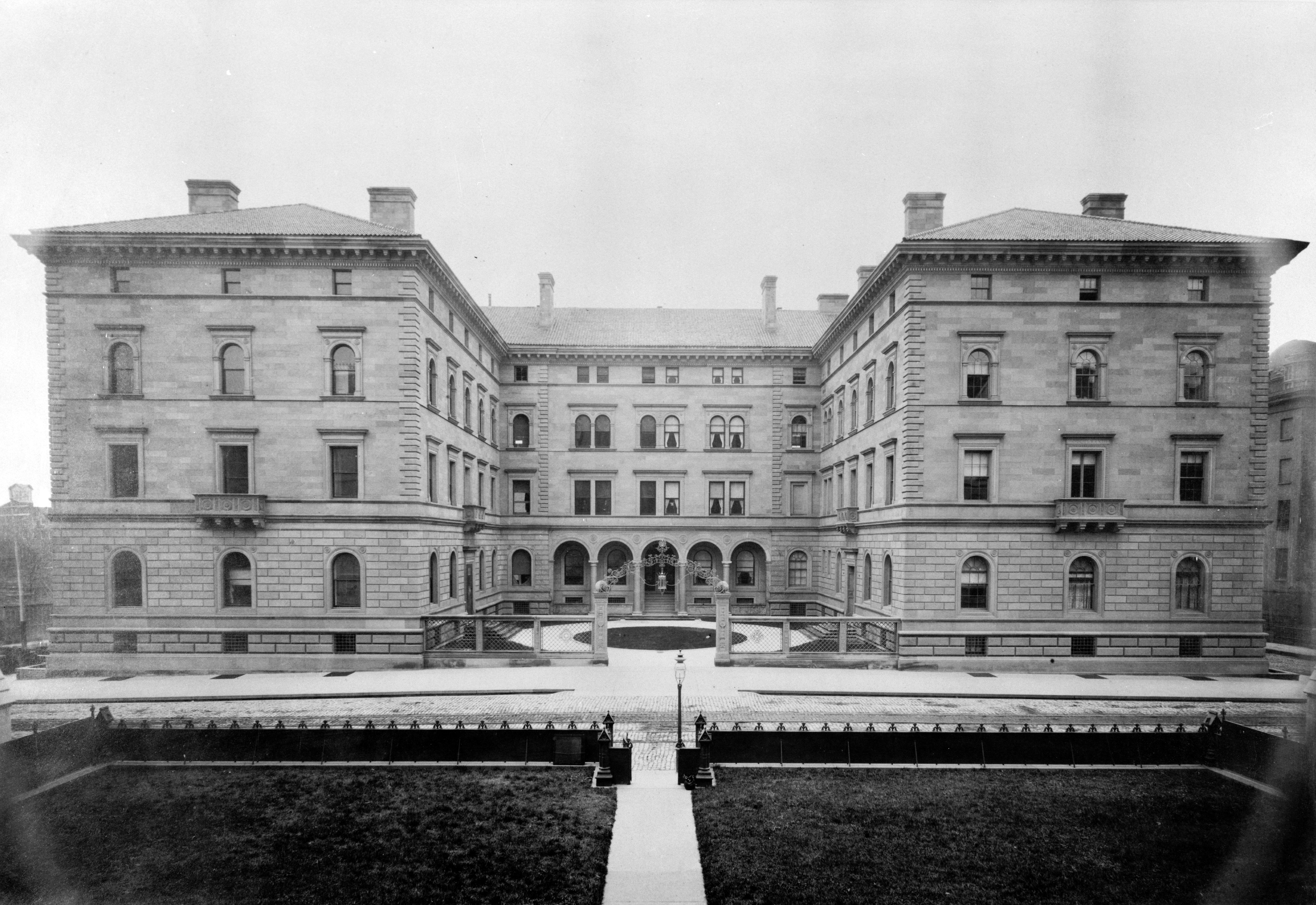
The houses seen c. 1890

The construction of the houses coincided with a decline in Villard's personal finances, which in turn was caused by his excessive investments in railroads. Villard moved into his mansion on December 17, 1883, on the same day that he resigned from the Oregon and Transcontinental Company. He was bankrupt by that time and could not formally sell the houses due to liens placed on his property. That month, Villard transferred two of the other lots next to his residence to his legal advisers, Edward D. Adams and Artemas H. Holmes. Villard mandated that Holmes and Adams complete the remaining residences in a similar style to his own residence. In January 1884, trustees William Crowninshield Endicott and Horace White took over Villard's residence to satisfy a $300,000 debt.

Amid the bankruptcy proceedings, a crowd protested in the courtyard in early 1884, believing all the houses around the yard belonged to Villard. The Villard family moved out of the residence that May, relocating to Dobbs Ferry, New York, permanently. Villard later recalled that his occupancy of the Madison Avenue house "was always a nightmare". Villard's bankruptcy prompted the railroad magnate Thomas Fletcher Oakes to renege on a promise to buy 455 Madison Avenue. Adams moved into Number 455, while Holmes occupied Number 453. In addition, Adams bought 24 East 51st Street and partnered with the investment banker Harris C. Fahnestock to acquire 22 East 51st Street. The trustees oversaw the completion of the remaining houses around the courtyard. A June 1884 letter from Holmes indicates that workers had not started constructing the courtyard yet. In 1885, Adams filed plans for an extra staircase, bathrooms, and a dressing room at 455 Madison Avenue.

Work on the houses continued until 1885, and Villard's finances had recovered by January 1886, when William Endicott and Horace White were listed as having substantially completed the Villard Houses. That month, Villard's wife Fannie Garrison Villard repurchased the properties for a nominal sum. The residence at 457 Madison Avenue was then sold to Fahnestock. He had waited several months to obtain Number 457, but the trustees refused to sell the property until the other houses, save for Number 451, had been rented. Fahnestock also bought Adams's ownership stake in 22 East 51st Street, and his son William moved there. Fahnestock had planned to combine 457 Madison Avenue and 22 East 51st Street as early as 1886, but this did not happen at the time. Meanwhile, Villard ended up selling his own residence, Number 451, to Darius Ogden Mills; that house became the residence of Mills's daughter Elisabeth Mills Reid, who was married to New-York Tribune editor Whitelaw Reid. The Reid family is variously cited as having paid $350,000 or $400,000.

=== Residential use ===
Originally, the residences were known as Cathedral Court because they faced St. Patrick's Cathedral. In the late 19th and early 20th centuries, the Villard Houses retained many of its original residents, even when neighborhoods further uptown became more fashionable. The Wells, Reid, Holmes, Adams, and Fahnestock families lived in the Villard Houses during the 1900s. By the early 1920s, the northern three residences belonged to the Fahnestock family, while two of the three southern residences were owned by the Reid family.

==== North wing ====
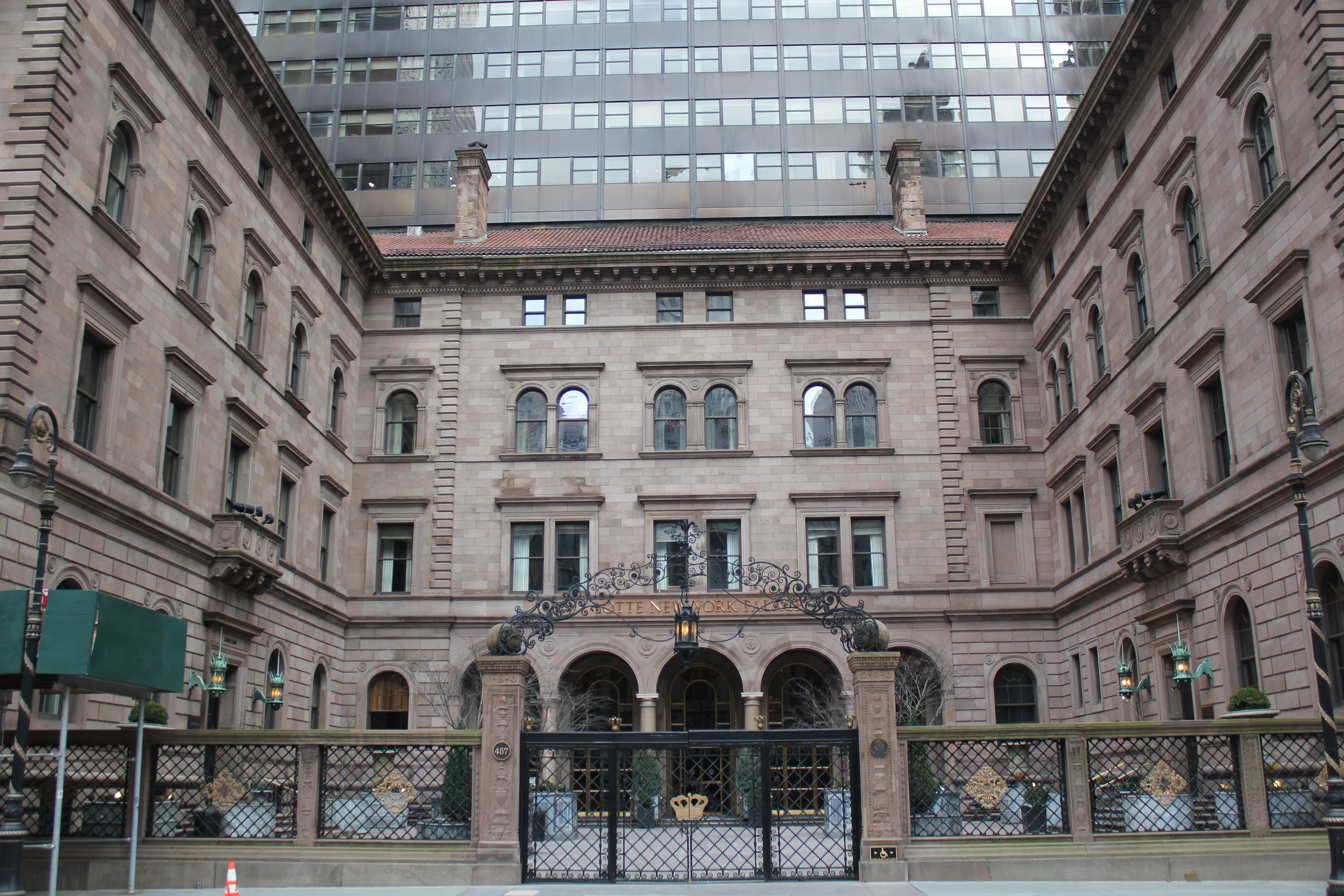
Seen from across Madison Avenue

The residence at 24 East 51st Street was purchased by Scribner's Monthly publisher Roswell Smith in September 1886, and Babb, Cook & Willard designed an expansion of Number 24 soon after. Roswell Smith died at 24 East 51st Street in 1892, and his estate sold 22 and 24 East 51st Street two years later to Catherine L. and Charles W. Wells for about $80,000. Businessman E. H. Harriman was living in the north wing by 1899, when The New York Times reported on his involvement in the Harriman Alaska expedition. The Wells family retained ownership of 24 East 51st Street until 1909, when the house was given to B. Crystal & Son as a partial payment for an apartment building in Washington Heights, Manhattan. Harris Fahnestock bought 24 East 51st Street in 1910 and gave the residence to his daughter Helen Campbell.

When Harris Fahnestock died in 1914, his son Clarence moved into Number 457. Clarence lived there until his death four years later, when Clarence's brother William inherited that house. William hired Charles Platt in 1922 to combine 457 Madison Avenue and 22 East 51st Street, and Platt removed the 51st Street entrance to the latter house. The Fahnestocks continued to live at Number 457 until 1929. William Fahnestock refinanced his portion of the property in 1932 with a $130,000 mortgage from the First National Bank. The next year, Helen Campbell's husband John Hubbard died at Number 24.

==== Central and south wings ====
The Reid family had moved into 451 Madison Avenue by early 1887, and they redecorated their rooms in a more ornate style shortly thereafter. Stanford White was hired to redesign the residence's public rooms. White added decorations such as glass-and-onyx panels, and Reid hired John La Farge to paint murals for Number 451's music room. Just as La Farge was completing the murals, White decided to change their color scheme, forcing La Farge to repaint the murals. The expansion was finished by 1892 and consisted of an L-shaped stairway leading to a double-arched entrance porch. The Reid family also redecorated Number 451's drawing rooms in 1891, and they hired Edwin Austin Abbey to create a painting for their dining room in 1896.

By 1904, the Reid family had expanded the basement to the east to accommodate enlarged service areas. A local architect, Louis Thouvard, designed the basement expansion and drew up plans for a Beaux-Arts–style expansion above it; however, the latter plans were not carried out. Whitelaw Reid became the U.S. ambassador to England the next year, and his family began spendign more time in England. They erected a seven- or eight-story addition east of Number 451 in 1909, which was designed by William M. Kendall of McKim, Mead & White. The next year, the firm designed alterations to Number 451, including new elevators. The architects also replaced a guest suite on the second story with a drawing room, and they expanded the basement and dining room. Whitelaw Reid died in England in 1912, and the Reids stopped hosting major events at the house in 1919, with Elisabeth choosing to spend time in her other home at Ophir Hall. The 1920 United States census recorded Elisabeth Mills Reid, as living at Number 451 with seventeen servants. Following Elisabeth's 1931 death, the furnishings in Number 451 were sold in May 1934, when thousands of people attended an auction there.

Number 453 was leased to William Sloane by 1916 and was placed for sale the following year. Elisabeth Reid acquired the house, loaning it during World War I to the American Red Cross. Reid hired Raymond Hood in 1920 to make alterations to Number 453, and an elevator was installed in that house the same year. No other structural changes to the house were documented until World War II. Next door, Edward D. Adams sold 455 Madison Avenue in 1922, following his wife's death. Helen Campbell's daughter, also named Helen, moved into Number 455 with her husband Clarence Gaylor Michalis and their children.

=== Commercial conversion ===
==== 1940s ====
The Fahnestock and Reid houses, which had been vacated when their owners died, continued to be unoccupied until World War II. The Reid family lent Number 451 to the Coordinating Council of French Relief Societies in March 1942. The following May, the French Relief Societies moved across the courtyard to Number 457, and the Women's Military Services Club opened its clubhouse in Number 451. At the opening of the Military Services Club, New York City mayor Fiorello La Guardia declared, "You won't see any more private mansions like this. You'll see more wholesome houses for more people."

Robert J. Marony acquired Number 457 for around $200,000 in June 1944. The government of the United States had to approve the sale because three Fahnestock heirs were overseas in internment camps during World War II. The title to Number 457 was transferred to Joseph P. Kennedy, former U.S. ambassador to the United Kingdom, in April 1945; Kennedy also obtained a 9/24 interest at 453–455 Madison Avenue. Kennedy ended up never living there, and it continued to be occupied by the French Relief Societies. There was also an unsuccessful plan to place the temporary headquarters of the United Nations in the Villard Houses. The Women's Military Services Club closed in January 1946 after the end of World War II, having served 200,000 people. Number 457, as well as a one-third interest in the courtyard, was acquired the same year by the publishing company Random House, which renovated the residence into its own offices. Random House's publisher, Bennett Cerf, bought the house for $450,000, believing that to be the price Kennedy had paid.

The Archdiocese of New York purchased the houses at 451 and 453 Madison Avenue and 29 East 50th Street in October 1948 for an unknown amount in cash. The residences, which had been vacant for three years, had an assessed value of $825,000. The archdiocese needed space for its various agencies near St. Patrick's Cathedral, and the agencies' old headquarters had been sold to make way for the office structure at 488 Madison Avenue. The archdiocese also purchased 455 Madison Avenue and 24 and 30 East 51st Street, as well as the vacant lot at 26–28 East 51st Street, in January 1949; these properties were valued at $600,000. Francis Cardinal Spellman dedicated the archdiocese's offices at 451 and 453 Madison Avenue that May. Clergy members who worked at these offices slept in the house at 455 Madison Avenue.

==== 1950s and 1960s ====
Following World War II, many of the neighboring residential buildings were razed to make way for office structures like the Seagram Building and Lever House, though the Villard Houses remained. The Archdiocese of New York hired Voorhees, Walker, Foley & Smith to renovate its office space during the early 1950s, though the renovation was not carried out. The firm did make small changes to 451 and 453 Madison Avenues; for example, some of the decorations were covered up, and a cafeteria was built at the rear of Number 453. In addition, 453 Madison Avenue became the Cardinal Farley Building, and 30 East 51st Street became the Cardinal Hayes Building. Helen Fahnestock Hubbard continued to reside at 24 East 51st Street until she died in 1955. The archdiocese then rented Number 24 to the Capital Cities Broadcasting Corporation, which was headquartered there. Capital Cities removed some of the architectural details, including wainscoting and paneling, from Number 24. In 1960, Random House subleased the first story of Number 24 from Capital Cities.

By the late 1960s, Random House owned Number 457, and the Archdiocese of New York owned all of the other houses. Random House initially intended to keep its space at 457 Madison Avenue, but ultimately leased space at an under-construction skyscraper at 825 Third Avenue in 1967. At the time, Cerf called the residence "too valuable to keep", although the writer William Shopsin said that Cerf had regretted leaving. By then, there were rumors that developers wanted to raze the houses and replace them with a skyscraper. The late Cardinal Spellman's successor, Terence Cardinal Cooke, had not made a public statement about the houses, but Monsignor James Rigney said: "At some point we would have to wonder whether we are justified in keeping property as valuable as this." On September 30, 1968, the New York City Landmarks Preservation Commission (LPC) designated the complex as official landmarks, preventing them from being modified without the LPC's permission. The landmark designation applied only to the sections of the buildings within 100 feet (30 m) of Madison Avenue.

=== Redevelopment ===
==== Preservation efforts ====
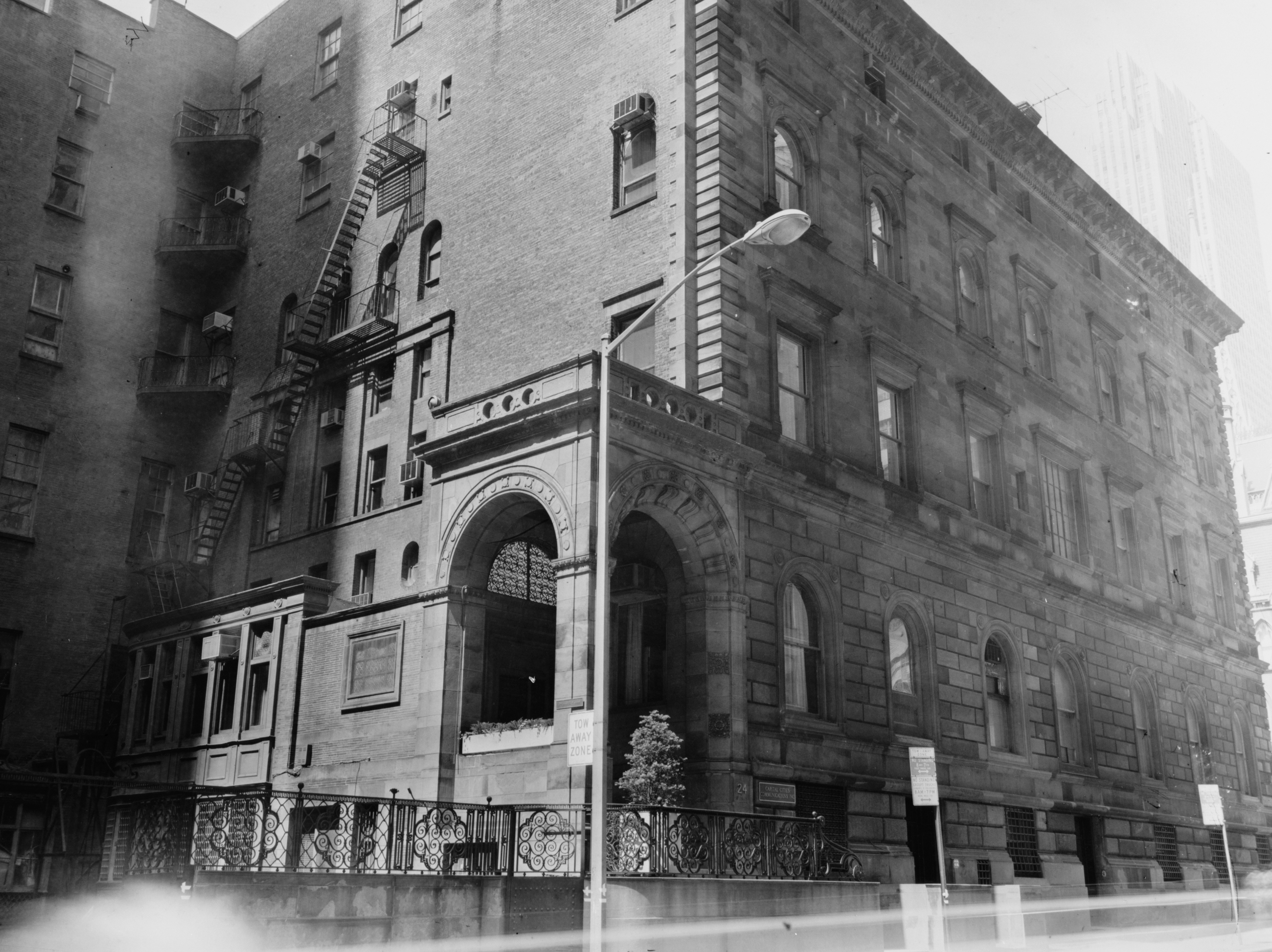
Entrance pavilion at 24 East 51st Street, pictured in 1977

In 1970, Richard Ottinger leased the old Random House mansion for his U.S. Senate campaign's offices. New York Times architectural writer Ada Louise Huxtable said the entire complex was in danger of being redeveloped if the archdiocese were to gain control of the Random House residence and thus full control of the land. After receiving $2.25 million from Gillette CEO Henry Jacques Gaisman, the archdiocese purchased Number 457 in early 1971. According to its real estate adviser, John J. Reynolds, the archdiocese wanted to preserve the houses so there would be open space in front of St. Patrick's Cathedral. Later in 1971, the archdiocese announced it would move to 1011 First Avenue by the following year and would lease out the Villard Houses. When its new headquarters opened in November 1973, the archdiocese said it hoped to find a lessee for the Villard Houses rather than sell them. The 1973–1974 stock market crash had led to a decline in demand for real estate, so the Villard Houses was vacant except for Capital Cities' offices.

In early 1974, the archdiocese was negotiating with developer Harry Helmsley to sell him the air rights above the Villard Houses. Next to or above the houses, Helmsley planned to build the 50-story Helmsley Palace Hotel, which would be designed by Emery Roth & Sons. By late 1974, the archdiocese had leased the Villard Houses to Helmsley for 99 years at around $1 million per year. Though the landmark status prevented Helmsley from modifying the houses' exteriors, he was free to redesign the interiors. As such, an early plan for the hotel called for demolishing the rear of the houses and gutting much of the interior, including the Gold Room, the south wing's former music room. This prompted concerns from preservationists who feared that the remaining interiors would become little more than a "meaningless stage set".

Following objections, Helmsley presented a modified plan in June 1975, which called for demolishing part of the rear and interior. The houses were placed on the National Register of Historic Places on September 2, 1975, which prevented federal funds from being used to finance the demolition of any of the houses without the federal government's approval. The same month, Helmsley presented a modified proposal that preserved the Gold Room. The archdiocese hired William Shopsin in January 1976 to conduct a historical survey of the Villard Houses. Shopsin recorded the buildings' architectural details for the Historic American Buildings Survey. After further delays, the New York City Planning Commission and the New York City Board of Estimate approved the 51-story hotel in late 1976. Although there were efforts to preserve all of the interiors, many of the rooms had been modified multiple times or had no architecturally notable features. Ultimately, only about one-fifth of the houses' interiors were preserved and reused.

==== Incorporation into Helmsley Palace Hotel ====
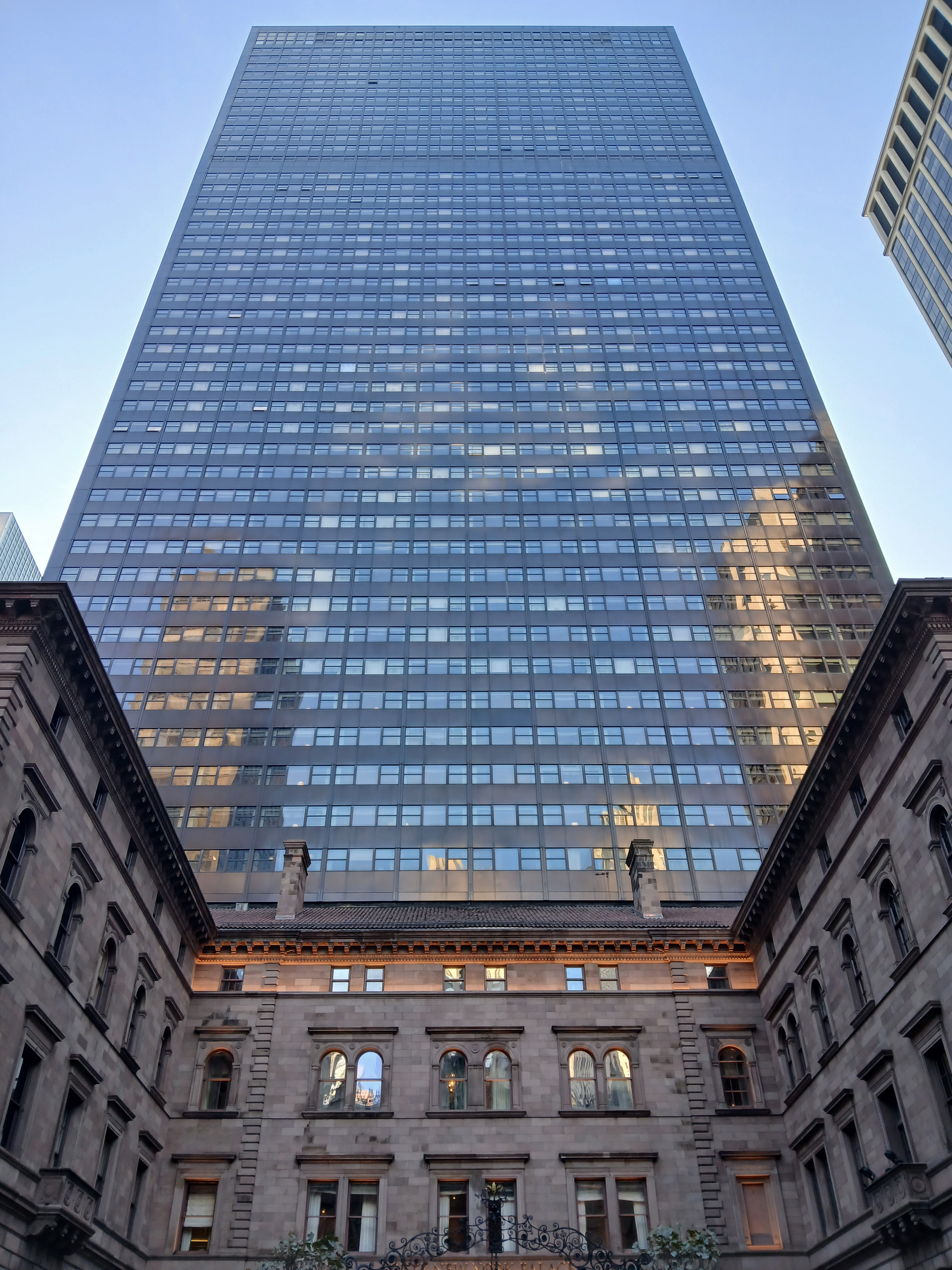
Looking up at the Palace Hotel's skyscraper addition

Emery Roth & Sons hired James W. Rhodes in early 1977 as an architectural consultant for the project. The archdiocese was obliged to pay $700,000 or $800,000 per year in taxes from 1975 to 1977 because the vacant houses were no longer tax-exempt. Helmsley paid half of this cost. By mid-1977, Helmsley was planning to begin demolishing the easternmost portions of the Villard Houses. This work included razing much of the central wing and the additions on 50th and 51st streets. A groundbreaking ceremony for the hotel occurred on January 25, 1978, and construction began two months later.

The decorative interiors of the Villard Houses were placed into temporary storage, and Helmsley took precautions to avoid damaging the houses. For instance, seismographs were installed in the houses to record any effects of blasting, while padding was installed within the building to prevent damage to the decorations. Sarah Lee was largely responsible for the redesign of the interior spaces. The Gold Room was renovated and turned into a cocktail lounge, while the old library was refurbished with 4,000 false books. The old drawing room of the south wing was redesigned as a cocktail lounge as well, while the old dining room became the hotel's Hunt Bar. The facade and courtyard were also restored. One of the houses' roofs was damaged in October 1979 when a heavy object fell through it.

=== Post-redevelopment ===
==== 1970s to 1990s ====
Helmsley leased 30,000 square feet (2,800 m^{2}) in the Villard House's northern wing to Jacqueline Kennedy Onassis in June 1979. The northern wing was to contain the Urban Center, the headquarters of four civic organizations: the American Institute of Architects, the Architectural League of New York, the Municipal Art Society (MAS), and the Parks Council of New York. That August, Capital Cities Communications leased space in the hotel tower. Capital Cities took over the central and south wings, with offices at 24 East 51st Street and the upper stories of 451, 453, and 455 Madison Avenue. A portion of the Villard Houses became a rentable event space within the hotel, which opened in September 1980.

James Stewart Polshek and Associates renovated the north wing of the Urban Center. The carved cornice and parquet floors of the north wing were restored, but the reception rooms were repainted and lighted for the new tenants. The Urban Center's space opened in August 1980, and the hotel opened the next month. An architecture bookstore run by MAS opened in the north wing in October 1980; the store's first exhibition was about the Villard Houses themselves. The Architectural League of New York also operated gallery space on the ground floor. The ground story of the south wing had a cocktail lounge in the former drawing room, a bar in the former dining room, and the Gold Room in the same place as before. The second floor was used for exhibitions, the third and fifth floors were used for organizations, and the first and fourth floors were rented as commercial space. The Urban Center's offices were rearranged from 1981 to 1982 because the original layout was inefficient.

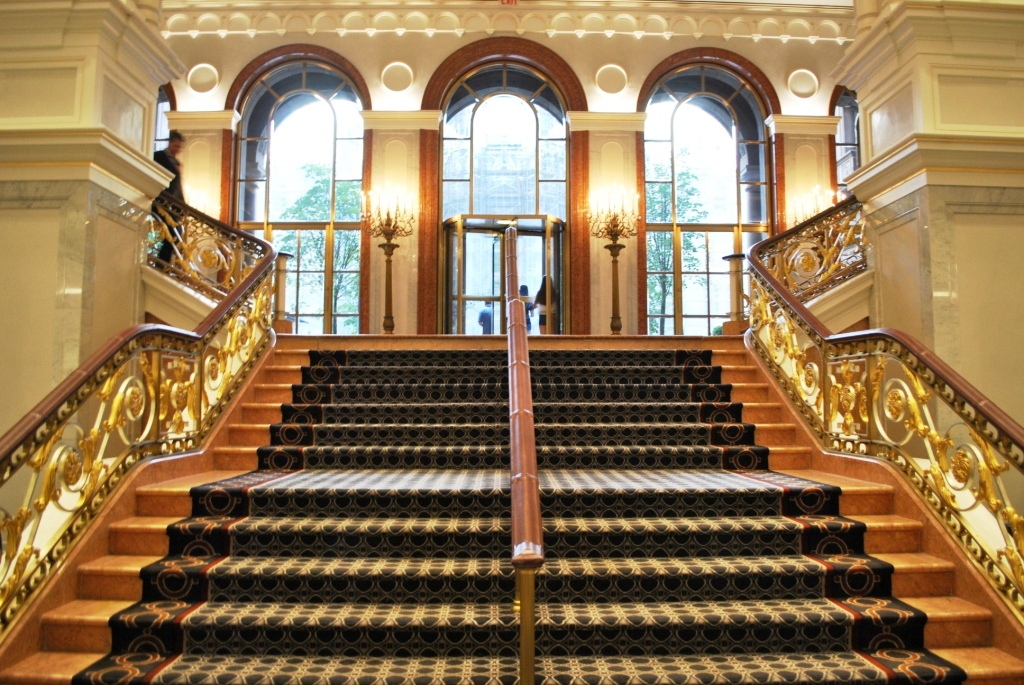
View of a stair in the Lotte New York Palace Hotel's lobby, formerly the center wing of the Villard Houses

Fashion boutique Celine of Paris leased a 5,500-square-foot (510 m^{2}) space in the north wing in 1981. During the 1980s and 1990s, the fraudulent debt-collection agency Towers Financial Corporation had offices at the Villard Houses. In late 1993, the Archdiocese of New York sold the houses and the hotel to the Sultan of Brunei for $202 million. The sale excluded the underlying land, which the Archdiocese of New York retained, and the Sultan of Brunei signed a 99-year lease for the land. Lee Jablin of Harman Jablin Architects was hired to renovate the hotel and Villard Houses in 1996, redesigning the hotel's lobby within the houses. The restaurant Le Cirque moved to the Villard Houses, taking up several rooms. The new Le Cirque location opened in April 1997. Adam D. Tihany designed the Le Cirque space with multicolored coverings over the previous interiors. Le Cirque was replaced by another restaurant, Gilt, in 2005.

==== 2000s to present ====
The Helmsley Palace Hotel's owners renovated the brownstone facade for $300,000 in late 2003. Some of the pieces for the restoration had come from the demolished rear portions of the houses. MAS held a discounted lease for the space in the north wing until 2006; when the discount expired, the organization had the option to pay market rates for another 24 years. MAS paid $175,000 in rent annually at the time, but it was already considering relocating. The organization moved out of the Villard Houses in 2010, and MAS's space stood vacant afterward.

In 2011, Northwood Investors bought the hotel and the Villard Houses, renovating them. The hotel's new owners sought to lease the north wing for at least $2,000 per square foot ($22,000/m^{2}) per year. In 2014, the residences hosted the annual Kips Bay Decorator Show House program to raise money for the Kips Bay Boys & Girls Club. The same year, menswear retailer Trunk Club leased the north wing. The hotel became the Lotte New York Palace Hotel after South Korean hotelier Lotte Hotels & Resorts bought it in 2015. Lotte rented out some of the rooms in the southern residence in 2016, and a restaurant named Villard opened within the southern residence the same year. In 2017, the Archdiocese of New York mortgaged the land under the Lotte New York Palace Hotel and the Villard Houses for $100 million to pay settlements to Catholic sexual abuse victims. The Gold Room restaurant was opened in 2019 within the room of the same name. Lotte bought the land under the Villard Houses and the hotel in 2025.

== Architecture ==
The Villard Houses complex was designed in 1881 by Joseph Morrill Wells of the firm of McKim, Mead & White. Charles Follen McKim, one of the firm's principal architects, was responsible for the overall plan, and Wells sketched out the individual details. The homes are among several projects that McKim, Mead & White designed for railroad magnate Henry Villard. Stylistically, the houses are in the Romanesque Revival style with Italian Renaissance touches; they were McKim, Mead & White's first major Italian Renaissance structures. At the time of the houses' construction, Wells had been encouraging the firm to use more classical architectural styles.

The design was influenced by Rome's 15th-century Palazzo della Cancelleria, though some inspiration may have come from the 16th-century Palazzo Farnese, also in Rome. The two palazzi were Wells's favorite Renaissance buildings. The houses' design contained some major deviations from those of the Roman palazzi. For example, the Cancelleria's windows were decorated based on internal use, with the most elaborate windows at the piano nobile, while the Villard Houses' windows were decorated based on the floor height, with the most elaborate windows illuminating the guests' and servants' rooms on the top floors. The houses were also partly influenced by the designs of German and Austrian multi-family buildings that Villard had seen in his youth.

=== Layout and courtyard ===
The building was erected as six separate residences in a U-shaped plan, (Note: This is sometimes cited as five residences. Two of the original homes in the north wing were combined in 1922.) with three wings surrounding a central courtyard on Madison Avenue. At the time of the houses' completion, they overlooked a similar courtyard at the eastern end of St. Patrick's Cathedral. The lady chapel in the cathedral had not yet been built, so St. Patrick's eastern end was a flat wall flanked by a rectory and an archbishop's house. The Villard courtyard was built to complement St. Patrick's courtyard, which was about the same size.

The south wing consisted of a single residence: Henry Villard's home at 451 Madison Avenue, also known as 29 1/2 East 50th Street. The north wing consisted of three residences at 457 Madison Avenue (which occupied the western two-thirds of that wing) and 22–24 East 51st Street. Both of these wings measure 60 feet (18 m) along Madison Avenue with a depth of 100 feet (30 m). The eastern end of the south wing had a seven-story tower, while the eastern end of the north wing had a 1 1/2-story entrance porch. The center wing, on the east side of the courtyard, consisted of two residences at 453 and 455 Madison Avenue, which extended 40 feet (12 m) eastward beyond the end of the north and south wings.

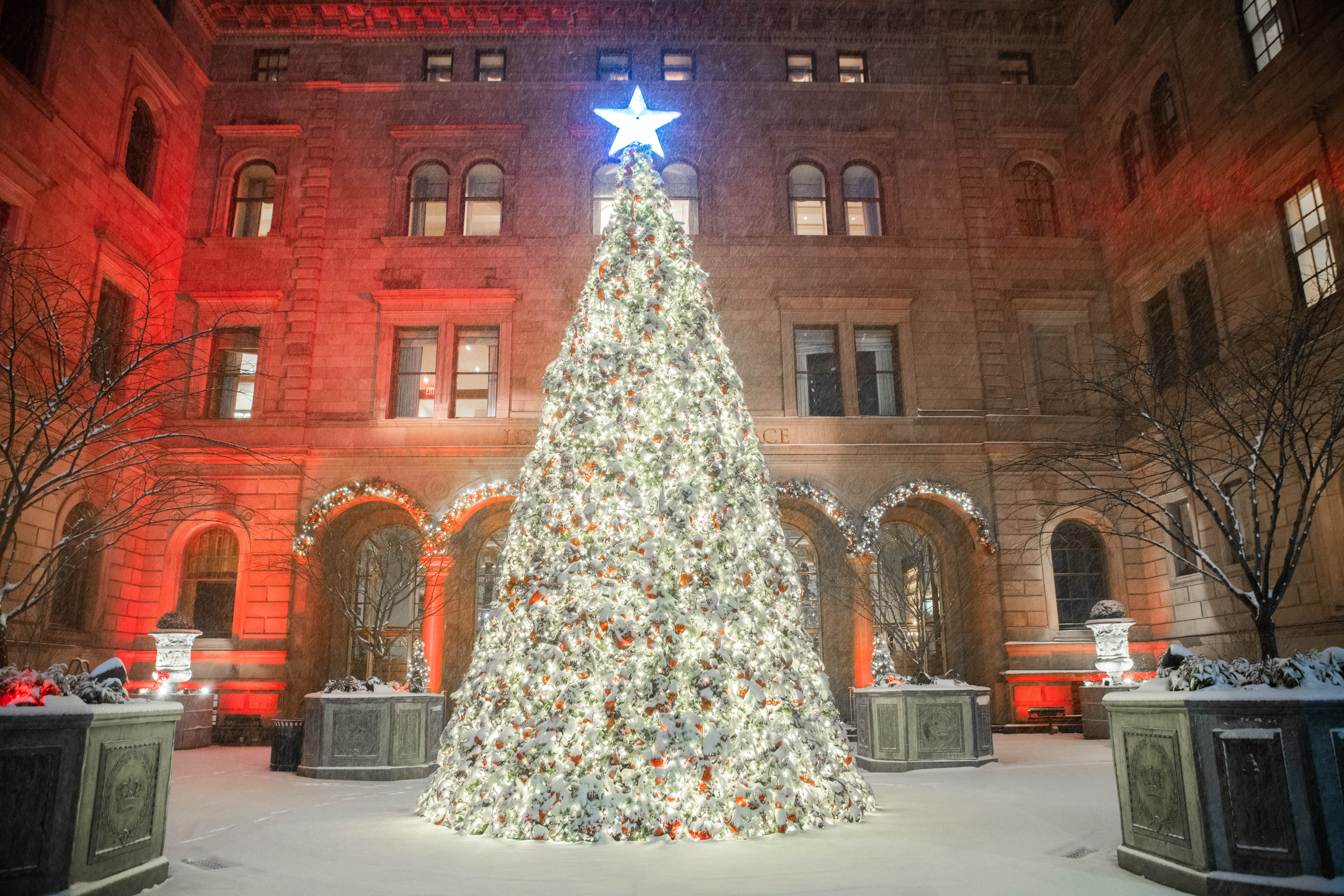
The courtyard during the holiday season

The courtyard was designed as both a symbol of Villard's wealth and, according to architectural writer Richard Guy Wilson, an "urban gesture" to traffic on Madison Avenue. The courtyard measures 80 feet (24 m) wide between the north and south wings and is 73 feet (22 m) deep. It is flanked by two square posts with ball decorations above them. These posts are connected by a scrolled arch made of wrought iron. A Florentine-style lamp is suspended from the wrought-iron arch. Originally, the courtyard had a fountain surrounded by a circular driveway. The driveway had been arranged to allow horse-drawn vehicles to enter the courtyard easily. The arrangement of residences around a courtyard was similar to the Apostolic Chancery at Vatican City. The Roman Catholic Archdiocese of New York used the courtyard as a parking lot during the mid-20th century. During the construction of the Helmsley Palace Hotel in the 1970s, a marble and granite medallion was placed in the courtyard. The courtyard is decorated each holiday season; its Christmas tree contains over 4,500 lights and over 1,000 ornaments.

=== Facade ===
The facade is made of largely unornamented brownstone. Villard had chosen the material against the advice of the architects, who had recommended using limestone or granite; this was the only part of the design where Villard had disagreed with Wells. Each house has a raised basement, three stories, and an attic topped by a cornice. The houses measure 68 feet (21 m) from the sidewalk to the top of the cornice. The north and south wings have three bays facing Madison Avenue, five facing the courtyard, and seven facing the respective side streets. The center wing has seven bays facing Madison Avenue. In addition, there are horizontal band courses wrapping around each floor under the window sills. The horizontal lines of the facade continued across all of the houses. Architectural commentators Leland M. Roth and Elizabeth Hawes wrote that the complex appeared more imposing than many contemporary townhouses, even though the Villard Houses were no taller than similar structures. The rear or eastern facades of each house had no architectural decorations at all because they were never intended to be viewed from the street.

The basement and first story of each house are rusticated, with deep grooves between each of the blocks. The raised basement consists of rectangular openings, above which runs a molding with torus (doughnut) shapes. The first floor has arched windows, which are topped by spandrel panels with rosette-shaped medallions. The first floor is topped by an architrave, or beam, with a plain frieze. The ground story of the center wing at 453 and 455 Madison Avenue contains a loggia with five arches. The loggia is supported by granite columns, and there are decorative medallions above the arches. Behind are the entrances to the center wing, as well as a barrel vault with rosette coffers and decorative moldings.

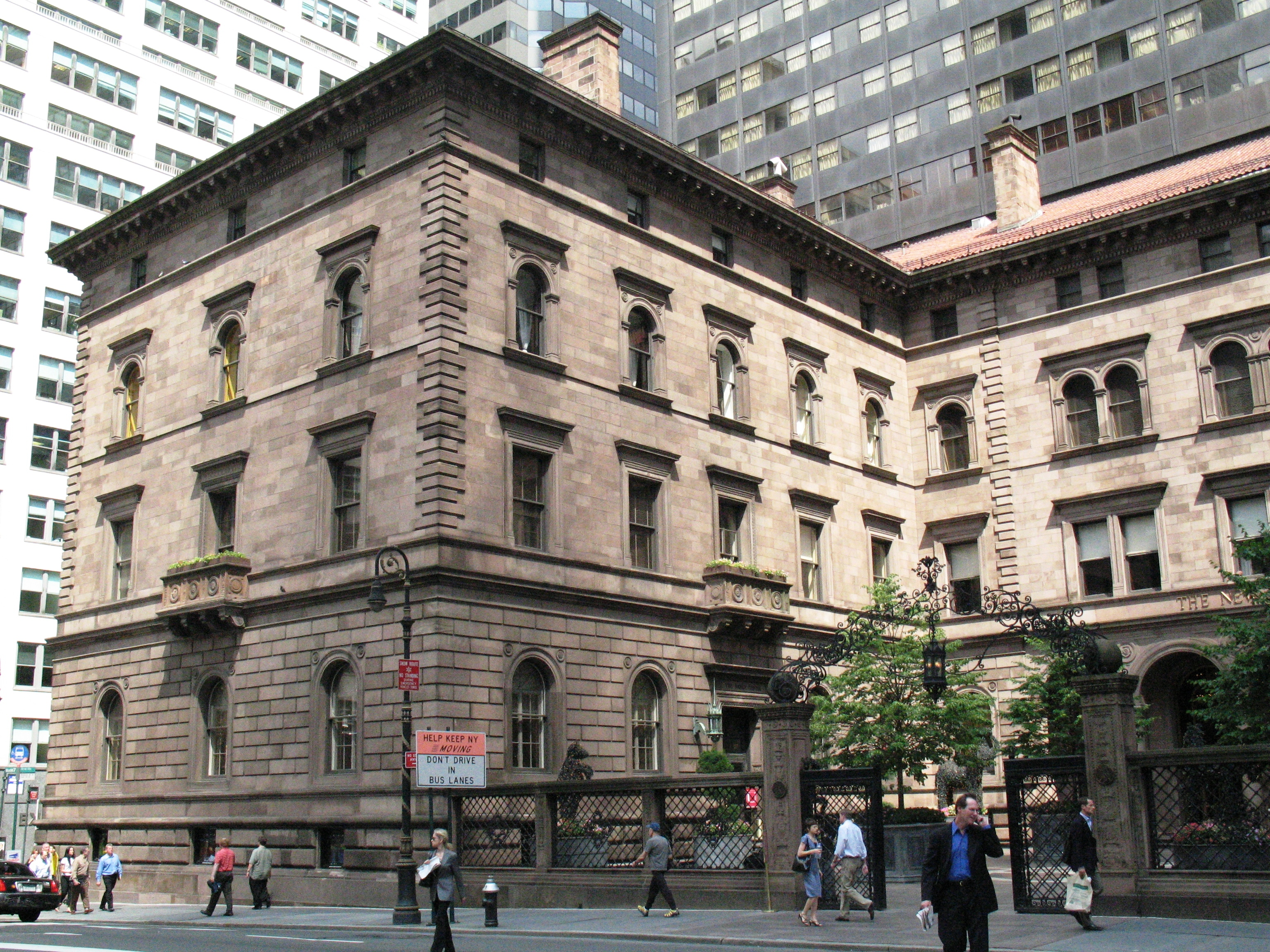
Looking toward the north wing from across Madison Avenue

The ground story of the north and south wings has doorways leading into the courtyard. The north wing at 457 Madison Avenue and the south wing at 451 Madison Avenue have doorways accessed by stoops. These entrances have a frieze and cornice above them, as well as lamps on either side. The entrances at 451 and 457 Madison Avenue were intended to be equal in stature to the center-wing entrances. This contrasted with regular houses, where the center entrance was typically the most imposing one. When the Helmsley Palace Hotel was built in the late 1970s and the south wing was converted to a bar, the former south-wing entrance was turned into an exit-only doorway. The south-wing doorway was close to the Lady chapel behind St. Patrick's Cathedral, and a state law mandated that bar entrances be at least 200 feet (61 m) from any house of worship. The residences at 22 and 24 East 51st Street had entrances from the street, rather than from the courtyard. Shortly after the houses were completed, an entrance portico measuring 11 by 53.5 feet (3.4 by 16.3 m) was added to the eastern side of 24 East 51st Street.

The upper stories are clad with plain stone ashlar. The quoins, or masonry blocks at the corners of each house, are rusticated. The houses externally appear as one residence, as these quoins do not delineate the divisions between the residences. On each of the three stories above the center wing's arches are three pairs of windows. Outside some of the second-story windows are balconies supported by console brackets. The year 1884 is inscribed in Roman numerals on the lintel above one of the windows in the south wing. A plain band course runs above the second floor, and a torus-shaped molding runs above the third floor. The attic is designed as a set of small square windows. The dentilled cornice contains egg-and-dart molding as well as modillions with foliate patterns. Above all these houses are sloping hip roofs with brown tile. Only the front portions of each house have hip roofs; the rears of the houses have brick parapets and pitched roofs.

=== Interior ===
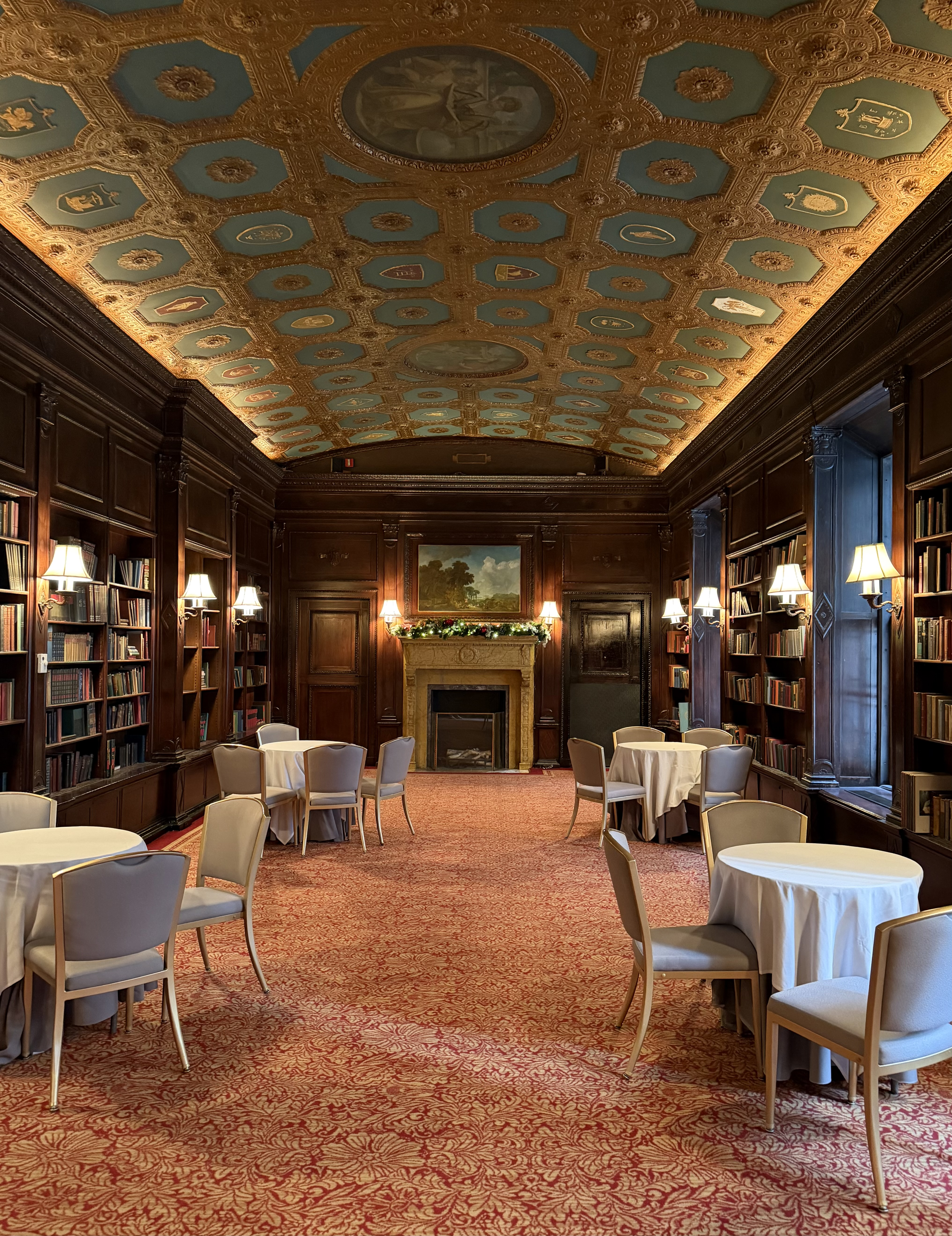
Library on the south wing's second floor

The interiors are designed in a modified version of the High Renaissance style. McKim, Mead & White selected the original interior decorations, hiring several friends to assist. These may have included artistic-glass manufacturer John La Farge, sculptor Augustus Saint-Gaudens, painter Francis Lathrop, and mosaic artist David Maitland Armstrong. Account books from the buildings' construction did not mention any of these artists, except for Lathrop, but contemporary media sources did report on some of their work. Leon Marcotte, Sypher and Company, and A. H. Davenport and Company provided some of the furniture. Candace Wheeler may have made the embroideries; Pasquali and Aeschlimann may have installed the mosaics; and Ellin & Kitson likely performed some of the stone carving. Joseph Cabus may have been responsible for much of the woodwork. Numerous suppliers were involved with other aspects of the houses' designs.

The layouts of Numbers 453 and 455 were mirror images of each other, while the other houses had unique layouts. All six residences' interiors were decorated with the highest-quality materials available at the time. As constructed, the residences had ornate furniture; for example, Villard's ground-story drawing room was originally upholstered with a reddish-brown color that harmonized with the color of the room. The residences had 13 bathrooms in total, each of which contained terrazzo floors and tile and marble walls. Each bedroom was equipped with own bathroom. The attic story of all of the residences was devoted to servants' rooms, storerooms, and other service facilities.

==== Main residence ====
From the outset, Villard's residence in the south wing, 451 Madison Avenue, was the most elaborately decorated of the six residences. The residence has twelve rooms on four floors, whose designs are inspired by those of grand European houses. Apart from a guest room with medieval theming, Villard's residence does not include any exotically-themed rooms, such as Moorish or East Asian rooms. There were originally a billiard room, kitchen, servants' dining room, laundry, and wine room in the basement. The sub-basement originally had three boilers and a high-pressure pump, which supplied water to a fifth-floor tank, and a hydraulic elevator served each level of the house. Following the construction of the Helmsley Palace Hotel in the 1970s, the basement spaces became back of house areas for the hotel. Except for the 1910 annex, much of Villard's residence remains intact.

===== Ground story =====
First floor layout prior to the construction of the Helmsley Palace Hotel. Villard's residence is to the right of the drawing, at the south end of the complex. There are additional residences to the left and at the top, which correspond to the northern and eastern wings respectively.

The ground, or first, story of Number 451 is the most elaborate in that residence. At ground level, there is a reception vestibule, a drawing-room suite, a music room with a balcony, and a dining room with a pantry. These rooms are arranged enfilade, or along a single axis. The ground story is slightly above street level. Many rooms are still used as part of the Helmsley Palace Hotel. For example, the drawing room is a cocktail room, the music room is a restaurant, and the dining room is a bar.

The Villard residence's reception vestibule was originally accessed through the southern side of the courtyard. The vestibule has a set of Italian-marble steps, a wall with a tile mosaic band, and a ceiling with a curving groin vault. Perpendicular to the vestibule is a marble-clad hall measuring 42 by 28 feet (12.8 by 8.5 m). The hall has three Siena-marble arches sculpted by Saint-Gaudens, as well as a fireplace with a carved marble mantel. The vaulted ceiling of the hallway is also made of Siena marble. Armstrong designed a mosaic with a foliate pattern on the ceiling. North of the hallway is a grand stairway decorated in gold-tinted marble, which leads to the second floor. The staircase, measuring 12 feet (3.7 m) wide, has a carved zodiac clock by Saint-Gaudens on one landing. Each of the balusters in the stair's railing has a different design. The hallway also has a small carved-wood elevator door near the reception vestibule.

At the western end of the south wing's hallway is a drawing-room suite divided into three sections. The wall is divided into three sections by red-mahogany pilasters; the upper part of the wall has Villard monograms. A movable oak partition could divide the room into three segments. The central section measures 14 by 28 feet (4.3 by 8.5 m) and is flanked by drawing rooms 19 by 28 feet (5.8 by 8.5 m). Joseph Cabus of Kimbel & Cabus designed wooden cabinetry for the space. The drawing rooms have mahogany and white wood finishes on a light reddish-brown and yellow color scheme. The family of the journalist Whitelaw Reid used these drawing rooms as a ballroom during the early 20th century, with green marble columns and a gilded ceiling. The drawing rooms formerly had ornate marquetry, which Reid subsequently reinstalled in his Purchase, New York, estate.

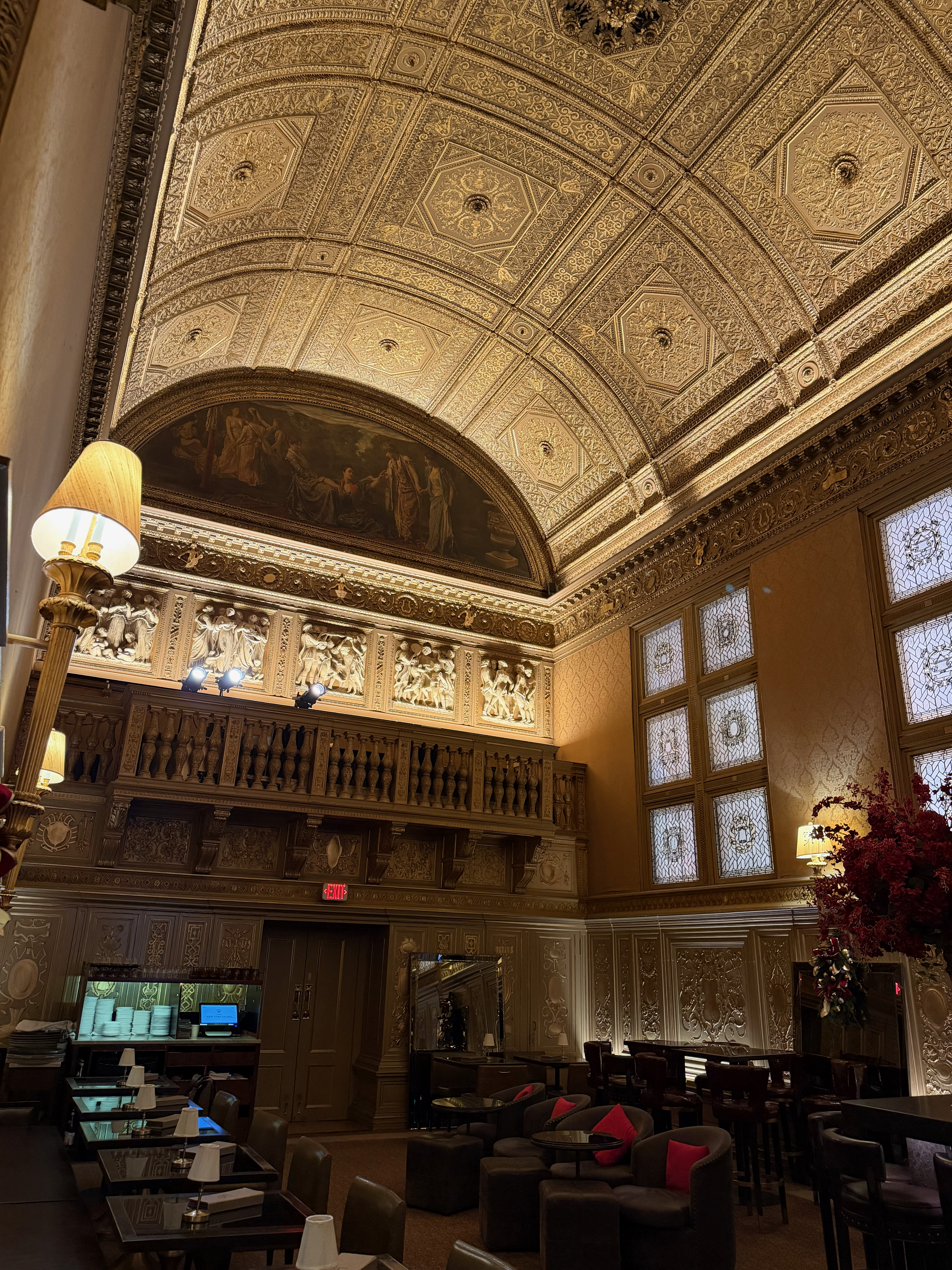
Music room, at the eastern end of the south wing

The eastern end of the south wing's hallway contains a music room measuring 48 by 24 feet (14.6 by 7.3 m), with an elliptical vaulted ceiling 32 feet (9.8 m) high. The music room is also known as the Gold Room after the color of its decorations. A carved-pine wainscoting runs around the music room's wall. A musicians' balcony is suspended on the north wall and can be accessed via a hidden staircase. Saint-Gaudens installed five plaster casts on each of the north and south walls, which are copies of "singing angels" that Luca della Robbia designed for the Florence Cathedral. John La Farge designed two lunettes or curved panels called "Art" and "Music", as well as leaded glass windows on the east wall.

The southernmost portion of the ground story is a 20-by-60-foot (6.1 by 18.3 m) space that could be divided into a breakfast room and dining room. The wall is made of English oak and white mahogany, while the ceiling is made of English oak beams. Saint-Gaudens carved two marble fireplace mantels, which were originally installed at either end of the room. One of the mantels was relocated several times before being installed in the Helmsley Palace Hotel lobby, while the other mantel was relocated to Whitelaw Reid's country estate. The ceiling has paintings of mythological figures, which were designed by Francis Lathrop. The dining room's cornice has inscriptions in Latin. A serving pantry opens off one side of the room.

===== Upper stories =====
The upper stories of Number 451 are laid out similarly to the ground story and also contained fireplaces. The second-story hallway has a gilded ceiling, embossed-leather walls, and a large mantelpiece; the decorators used leather and wood to give the space a more intimate feeling. Adjoining the private music room is a private library fitted in mahogany with carved medallions on the bookcases. The coffered ceiling contains medallions and three murals. The second-floor guest bedroom has oak paneling, gold and crimson decorations on the walls, and a ceiling with wooden crossbeams.

A stairway with a wainscoted wall and a decorated balustrade leads between the second and third stories of the south wing. The upper-story bedrooms are decorated with painted woods and could be accessed by an elevator. The bedrooms on the third floor originally had chintz wall hangings and colorful decorations. Henry Villard's bedroom was on either the third or the fourth floor. A stair leads up to the family room, which had low ceilings and a cherry color scheme. Within the annex to the east, Whitelaw Reid's second-floor dining room and library have been converted into a meeting room with a pantry. The annex also includes Whitelaw Reid's former study, which later became another meeting room in the hotel.

==== Fahnestock residence ====
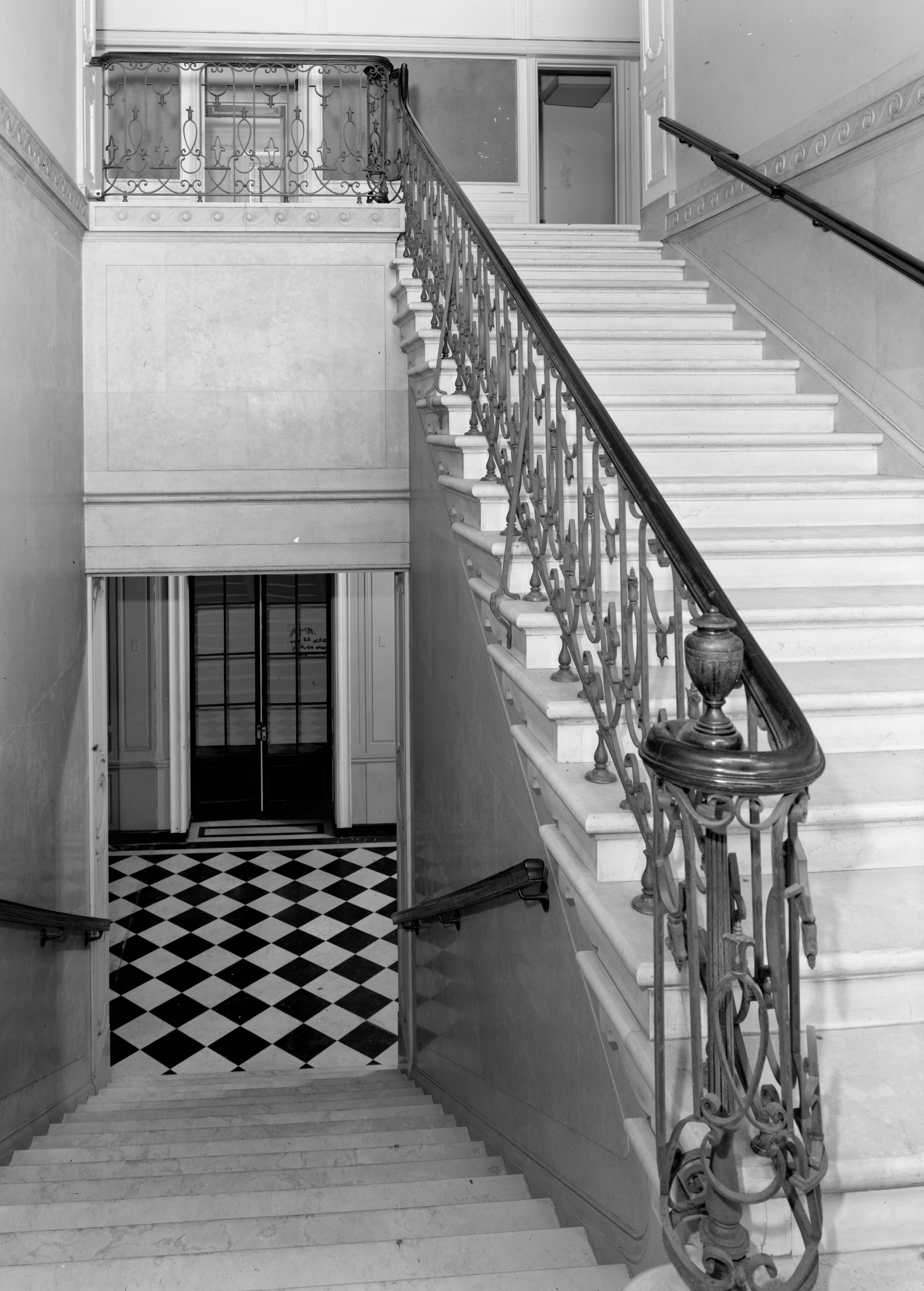
A grand staircase in the Fahnestock house at 457 Madison Avenue

The Fahnestock residence in the north wing, at 457 Madison Avenue, formerly shared many design elements with the Villard residence at Number 451, such as wooden paneling and mosaic floors. An entrance foyer leads from the courtyard. From the foyer, stairs lead down to a reception room and up to the first-floor entertaining rooms. The first floor has a main hall with mosaic-tile floors, lanterns, and paneling, in addition to a fireplace and a ceiling with recessed coffers. On the same story is a dining room with an elaborate fireplace and a decorative ceiling with a chandelier. There is also a library with a dome (originally designated as a reception room), as well as a drawing room that originally had Louis XV style and Louis XVI style tapestries.

A marble stairway rises to the second floor, which includes the Fahnestocks' former bedrooms. The third floor of Number 457 has additional bedrooms, while the attic was for the butlers and maids. Stanford White designed an ornate ceiling at 457 Madison Avenue. The oak-clad library of Number 457 has ivory buttons with the letters "B" and "M", which once respectively summoned a butler and a maid. In the 1980s, the third story of Number 457 was taken by the Urban Center, which had a members' gallery facing the courtyard as well as a committee room and a staff room. When the eastern section of the north wing was demolished in the 1970s, one room was reconstructed on the third floor of the Helmsley Palace Hotel.

==== Other residences ====
The courtyard's central loggia originally led to a vestibule, which connected with both 453 and 455 Madison Avenue. Although numbers 453 and 455 originally had similar layouts, both were modified substantially in the late 19th and the 20th centuries. Number 455 had an entrance hall with an oval dome, as well as a living hall with mahogany paneling and a filigreed clock. The reception room had a decorative frieze, molded plaster ceiling, and walls with alternating wood paneling and mirrors. The decorative stairway at 455 Madison Avenue was moved to the Brooklyn Museum in the 1970s. Both residences' interiors were largely demolished in 1978, though some decorations were salvaged. Within the former central loggia, a grand staircase leads down to the main hotel lobby. This lobby includes a fireplace originally designed by Saint-Gaudens. In addition, a former study at 455 Madison Avenue was repurposed into a meeting room for the Helmsley Palace Hotel.

The residence at 22 East 51st Street was in the middle of the northern wing. Unlike most of the other houses in the complex, it had an elevator from the outset. There was also a reception room with a skylight and a small living hall with a fireplace. The main staircase hall had a pantry on one landing, and there was an oval opening above the staircase. This residence was merged with 457 Madison Avenue in the 1920s.

== Reception ==
=== Contemporary commentary ===
At the time of the houses' completion, wealthy New Yorkers found the buildings' design to be restrained compared with other mansions. The trade magazine Real Estate Record initially said there was "nothing indeed to indicate architecture except the delicacy of some of the detail". By contrast, the British magazine The Architect said the Villard residence "will be the most magnificent residence building in the [United] States, far surpassing the Vanderbilt houses" along Fifth Avenue.

After the houses were complete, a critic for the Real Estate Record characterized the Villard Houses as "a mild success" and said that despite their large size and plain facade, the houses were "in no way offensive and can never come to look trivial or vulgar". Another article for the same publication described the Villard residence in particular as "the only example of consistent adherence to one style" in New York City. The New York Evening Post said the residences were unique among New York City residences and were a departure from the château-style residences elsewhere in the city.

The main residence was the subject of an 1897 handbook published by Edith Wharton. The historian William C. Shopsin writes that, because of the generally positive reception of the Villard Houses' architecture, McKim, Mead & White was hired to design the Boston Public Library's McKim Building; the Villard Houses' architectural style directly influenced that of the McKim Building.

=== Retrospective commentary ===
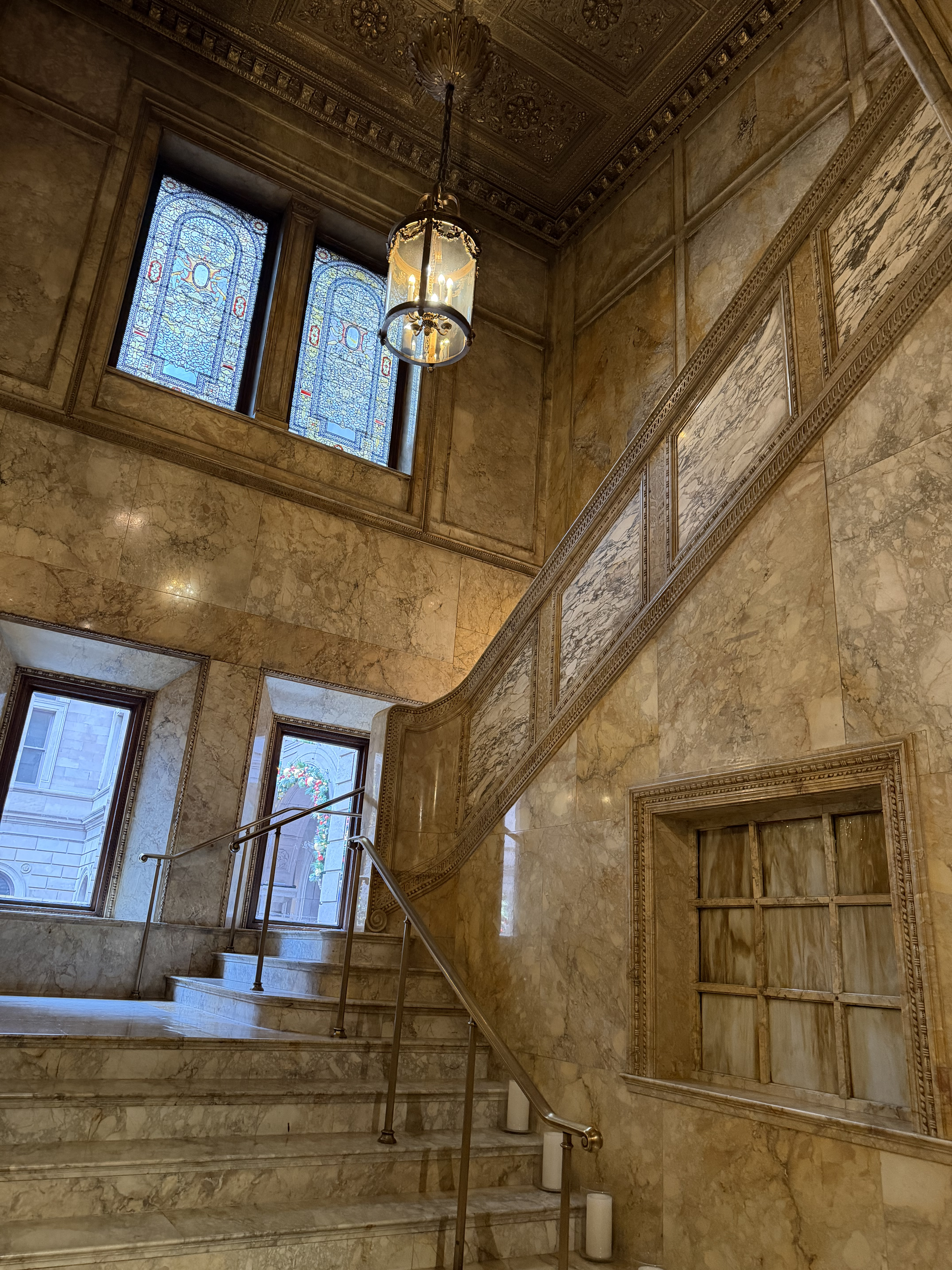
Staircase in the south wing

The Christian Science Monitor wrote in 1934 that the buildings retained "the same dignity that accompanied them in 1883" and that their construction had spurred the start of interior decoration. The same year, in his book The Robber Barons, Matthew Josephson wrote that the luxurious appearance of the houses had been a source of resentment from the general public. The Villard Houses' design may have prompted the architect Le Corbusier to say that he liked New York's Renaissance Revival houses more than the originals in Florence. Donald Hoffmann, architectural critic for The Kansas City Star, wrote in 1967 that the Villard Houses were "considered the single most important building in touching-off the academic reaction in American architecture", while Ada Louise Huxtable said the next year that they were among the city's best-ever designs. The New York Times reported in 1971, "The complex has long been regarded as one of New York City's architectural treasures." Despite this, many New Yorkers overlooked its existence through the late 20th century. Harmon Goldstone and Martha Dalrymple wrote in 1974 that the houses' continued existence was "a minor miracle", and John Corry of The New York Times wrote in 1980 that the residences "make up as interesting a piece of real estate as there is in New York".

During the 1970s, when the Helmsley Palace Hotel was being developed, preservationists fought strongly to keep the houses. Huxtable called Helmsley's 1974 proposal for the hotel "a death-dealing rather than a life-giving 'solution'", and she similarly criticized the June 1975 plan, as "a wretched failure". By contrast, when the September 1975 proposal called for saving the Gold Room, Huxtable stated: "There is now the promise of a solution that all can abide by." Many preservationists were not completely content with the hotel's presence, but Helmsley nevertheless received credit for saving the houses. After the hotel was completed, Paul Goldberger wrote in The New York Times that the hotel tower's boxy facade lacked the architectural appeal of the Villard Houses, but that the residences' interiors still gave the hotel "the finest public rooms of any hotel in New York". A writer for the Hartford Courant said that, though the most important parts of the houses had been saved, he believed they "probably looked better without the big black tower that grows out of their back". Architecture: the AIA journal described the project in 1981 as "a product of admirable human energy and down-to-earth compromise and [...] a much happier event than the architectural funeral most observers would have bet on six years ago".

The architectural writer Robert A. M. Stern described the Villard Houses as McKim, Mead & White's "first scholarly essay in the Classical architecture of the Italian Renaissance", and Leland M. Roth described Villard's residence in particular as "a standard of restrained elegance in interior decoration". Michael C. Kathrens wrote in 2005 that "under almost any criteria, the Villard Houses are masterpieces of refined interpretation." Elizabeth Hawes said the houses helped to popularize the use of classical architectural styles in the city's residences. The history of the houses was also detailed in Mosette Broderick and William Shopsin's 1980 book The Villard Houses: Life Story of a Landmark.

== See also ==
- List of New York City Designated Landmarks in Manhattan from 14th to 59th Streets
- National Register of Historic Places listings in Manhattan from 14th to 59th Streets
