= Jablin =

Jablin is a surname. Notable people with the surname include:

- David Jablin, American television producer
- Lee Jablin (born 1949), American architect
