= Lotte New York Palace Hotel =

Hotel in Manhattan, New York

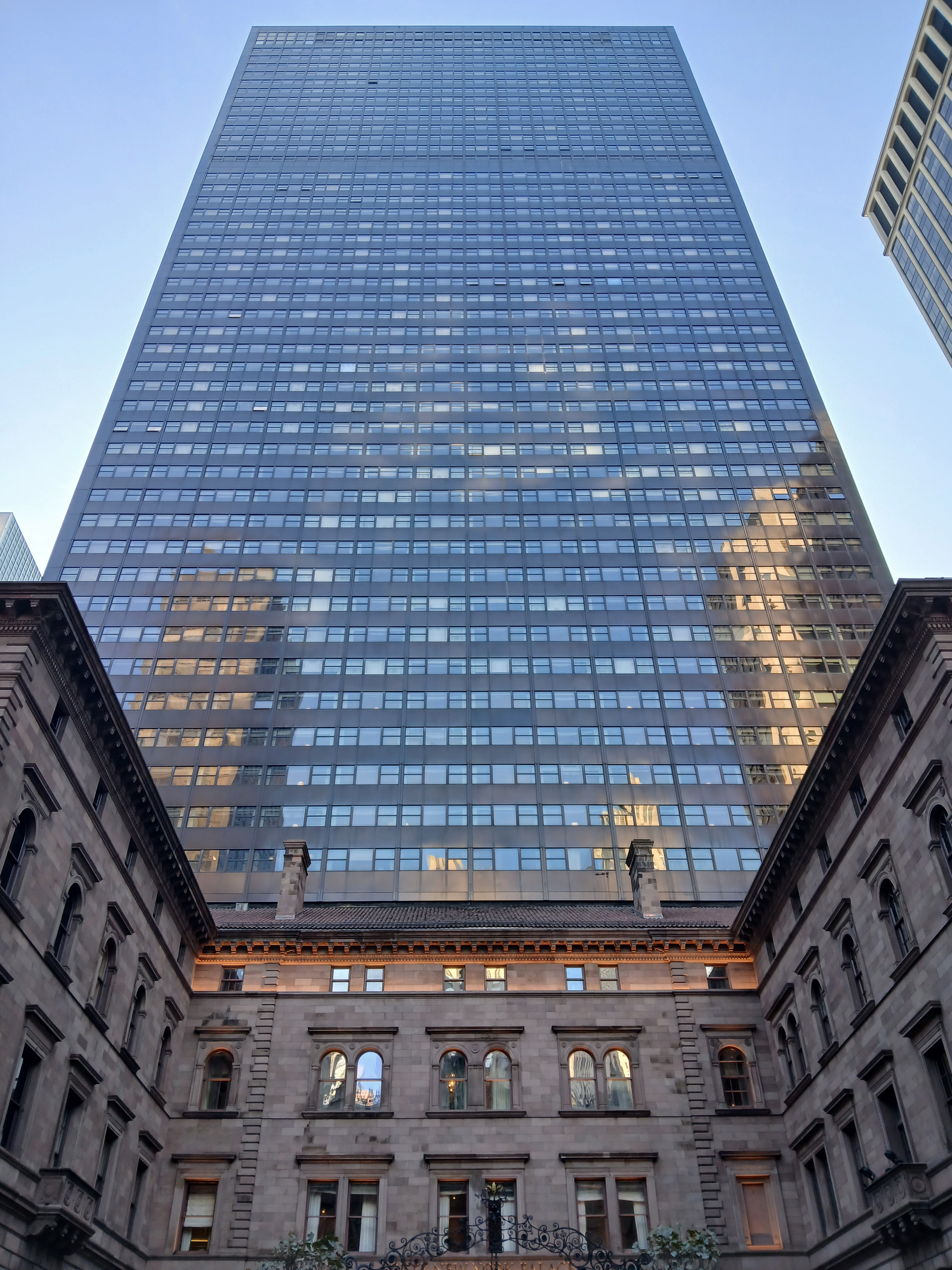
- Lotte New York Palace Hotel, with the historic Villard Houses in the foreground

General information
- Location: 455 Madison Avenue; Manhattan, New York 10022
- Coordinates: 40°45′29″N 73°58′30″W
- Opened: September 15, 1980
- Owner: Land: Lotte Hotels & Resorts; Building: Lotte Hotels & Resorts
- Operator: Lotte Hotels & Resorts

Height
- Height: 563 feet (172 m)

Technical details
- Floor count: 51

Design and construction
- Architects: Villard Houses: McKim, Mead & White; Helmsley Palace: Emery Roth & Sons; New York Palace: Lee Jablin of Harman Jablin Architects
- Developer: Harry Helmsley

Other information
- Number of rooms: 822
- Number of suites: 87
- Number of restaurants: 2

Website
- www.lottenypalace.com

Lotte New York Palace Hotel is a luxury hotel in the Midtown Manhattan neighborhood of New York City, at the corner of 50th Street and Madison Avenue. It was originally developed between 1977 and 1980 by Harry Helmsley. The hotel consists of a portion of the Villard Houses, built in the 1880s by McKim, Mead & White, which are New York City designated landmarks and listed on the National Register of Historic Places. It also includes a 51-story skyscraper designed by Emery Roth & Sons and completed in 1980.

The Villard Houses, arranged in a U-shaped plan, consist of three wings surrounding a central courtyard on the east side of Madison Avenue. The houses' center wing serves as a lobby, while the south wing serves as an event space. Behind the Villard Houses to the east is the modern skyscraper addition. As of 2021, the hotel has 909 rooms and suites. The top floors of the skyscraper are known as the Towers, which consist of 176 luxury units. Among the units in the Towers are four ornate triplex suites, each with their own decorations, as well as four other specialty suites.

The Helmsley Palace Hotel opened in 1981 and was operated by Helmsley until 1992. As part of a bankruptcy proceeding, it was sold in 1993 to the Sultan of Brunei, who completely renovated the hotel and Villard Houses. The government of Brunei took over the hotel from the royal family in 2009. Northwood Investors, an American real estate investment firm, bought the hotel from the government of Brunei in 2011 and renovated it. The hotel was sold again in 2015 to Korean luxury hotel operator Lotte Hotels & Resorts, which renamed it the Lotte New York Palace Hotel.

== Site ==
The hotel is located in the Midtown Manhattan neighborhood of New York City, bounded by Madison Avenue to the west, 51st Street to the north, and 50th Street to the south. The hotel's land lot is L-shaped and contains a 55-story skyscraper, along with most of the Villard Houses to the west. The lot, carrying the address 455 Madison Avenue, has a frontage of 140 feet (43 m) on Madison Avenue and 200 feet (61 m) on 50th Street, and it covers 35,720 square feet (3,318 m^{2}). The northernmost of the Villard Houses is on a separate land lot at 457 Madison Avenue. Nearby buildings include Olympic Tower, 11 East 51st Street, and 488 Madison Avenue to the northwest; St. Patrick's Cathedral to the west; and 18 East 50th Street and the Swiss Bank Tower to the southwest.

== Description ==
As of 2021, the hotel has 909 rooms and suites, which are divided into 822 guest rooms and 87 suites. There are 72 rooms specifically designed for guests with disabilities.

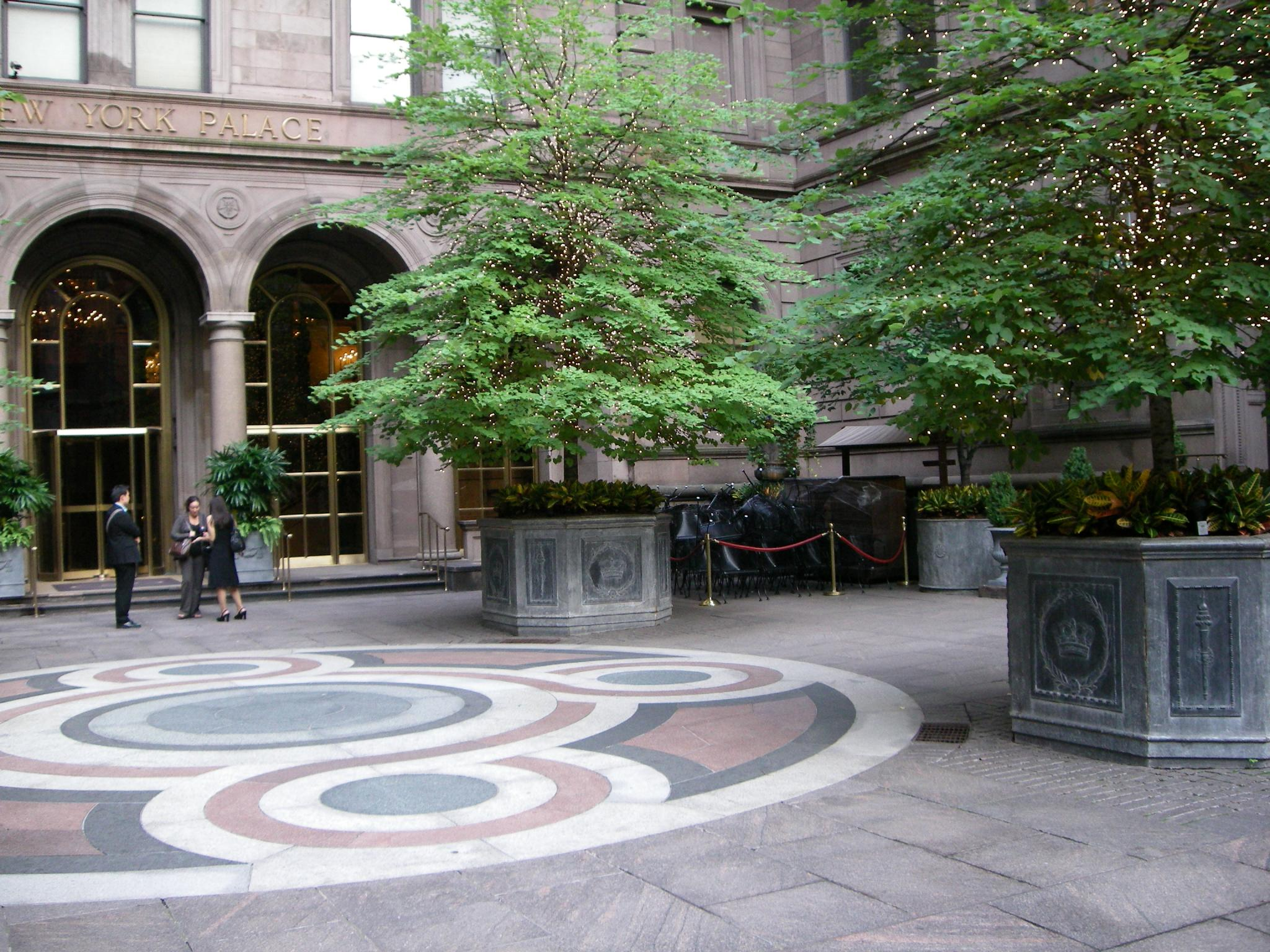
Courtyard in 2008

=== Villard Houses ===
The Villard Houses were erected as six separate residences in a U-shaped plan, with three wings surrounding a central courtyard on Madison Avenue. The south wing consisted of a single residence at 451 Madison Avenue. The north wing consisted of three residences at 457 Madison Avenue and 24–26 East 51st Street. The center wing was a double house at 453 and 455 Madison Avenue. The facade is made of Belleville sandstone, which largely lacks ornamentation. Each house consists of a raised basement, three stories, and an attic topped by a cornice. The ground story of the center wing also includes five arches, which lead to the lobby.

The courtyard measures 80 feet (24 m) wide between the north and south wings and is 73 feet (22 m) deep. It is flanked by two square posts with ball decorations above them. These posts are connected by a scrolled arch made of wrought iron. A Florentine-style lamp is suspended from the wrought-iron arch. Originally, the courtyard had a fountain surrounded by a circular driveway. The driveway had been arranged to allow horse-drawn vehicles to enter the courtyard easily. During the construction of the Palace Hotel in the 1970s, a marble and granite medallion was placed in the courtyard. The courtyard was renovated in 2013.

==== Lobby and surrounding spaces ====
The modern main entrance, through the former center wing of the Villard Houses, consists of a grand staircase down to the main hotel lobby. This central flight is flanked by two flights that lead up to the mezzanine of the hotel's skyscraper section. A red Verona-marble fireplace by Augustus Saint-Gaudens is preserved at the mezzanine, directly opposite the entrance from the courtyard. Underneath the grand staircase is a bar called Trouble's Trust, named after the trust fund that belonged to the dog of Leona Helmsley, the wife of the hotel's original owner Harry Helmsley.

Some of the interior spaces from the Villard Houses are preserved in the modern hotel. The south wing of the houses contains the Gold Room, a space with a vaulted ceiling that originally served as a music room. There are two lunettes by John La Farge, as well as a balcony formerly used by musicians, in the Gold Room. Since 2019, the room has operated as a bar called the Gold Room during the evenings. During mornings and early afternoons, the room operates as part of a restaurant called Villard.

=== Skyscraper ===
The skyscraper portion of the New York Palace Hotel was designed with a bronze-colored aluminum and glass facade. The skyscraper cantilevers partially over the houses but rests on its own foundations. It was constructed as a rectangular slab rising 563 feet (172 m). The structural system was designed by Cantor Seinuk. Of the 909 units, 176 are in the Towers portion of the hotel, spanning the 41st through 55th floors. The remaining 733 rooms span the ninth through 36th floors.

A lobby extending between 50th and 51st Streets was included as part of the Palace Hotel's skyscraper portion. Pomme Palais, which serves pastries, is in this part of the hotel. The mezzanine level above the lobby contains a 25-seat wine lounge named Rarities, which is open by appointment only. Rarities is also open to members, although membership fees were $15,000 per year as of 2020. Additionally, when the eastern section of the Villard Houses' north wing was demolished in the 1970s, one room was reconstructed on the third floor of the Palace Hotel.

==== The Towers ====
The Towers was created during a renovation in the 1990s. The rooms are accessed by their own lobby and elevators. The suites consisted of 39 one-bedroom units; four triplex suites each covering 5,000 square feet (460 m^{2}) across three stories; and the Metropolitan Suite, taking up what was previously the living space of the hotel manager. The four triplex units, as well as four additional single-story units, comprise the hotel's Royal Suite Collection and are each designed and branded separately.

All four triplexes have their own elevators and rooftop terraces. Two of the triplex suites are known as the Champagne and Jewel suites. According to a sales and marketing director for the hotel, these suites were often occupied by business and political leaders and their families. The Champagne Suite has a marble floor, a double-height "Grand Parlour", a tasting lounge, and a terrace with a fireplace and hot tub. The Jewel Suite has a double-height chandelier made of crystals, a set of "jewel boxes", a grand parlor with 15-foot-tall windows, a fireplace, and a garden on the terrace. The other two triplex suites, the Madison Avenue Penthouse and the Park Avenue Penthouse, were refurbished in 2020. The lowest level of either of these triplexes contains a living area, overlooked by a second-story balcony. The third story of these suites has the terrace as well as a media room and a fireplace.

The single-story suites in the Royal Suite Collection are known as the Hästens Ultimate Sleep Suite, Empire Skyview Suite, Manhattan Skyview Suite, and Imperial Suite. The Hästens Ultimate Sleep Suite was renovated in 2019 as part of a partnership with Hästens; it has three beds, a combined living/dining room, a kitchen with a wet bar, and an informational exhibit on the Hästens brand. The bed in the master bedroom, reportedly the only one of its kind in the world, was valued at $200,000. As part of the Hästens partnership, the company also placed its beds in the other three suites. Each of the Skyview suites has a living room, dining room, kitchen, entertainment area, gym, and private library. According to the hotel's website, the Imperial Suite is decorated in gold and taupe and has a foyer, living room, dining room, master bedroom, and two guest bedrooms.

== History ==
The six Villard Houses were commissioned in the 1880s by Henry Villard, then the president of the Northern Pacific Railway. The houses took six years to build. They served as the family residences of several prominent New Yorkers through the late 19th and early 20th centuries. By the late 1960s, Random House had just moved out of the northernmost house at 457 Madison Avenue, while the Roman Catholic Archdiocese of New York owned all of the other houses. In 1968, the New York City Landmarks Preservation Commission (LPC) designated the Villard Houses as official landmarks, preventing them from being modified without the LPC's permission. The Archdiocese of New York bought number 457 in early 1971 and moved out of the entire complex two years later. At the time, the archdiocese said it hoped to find a lessee for the Villard Houses rather than sell them.

=== Planning and construction ===
==== Initial plans ====
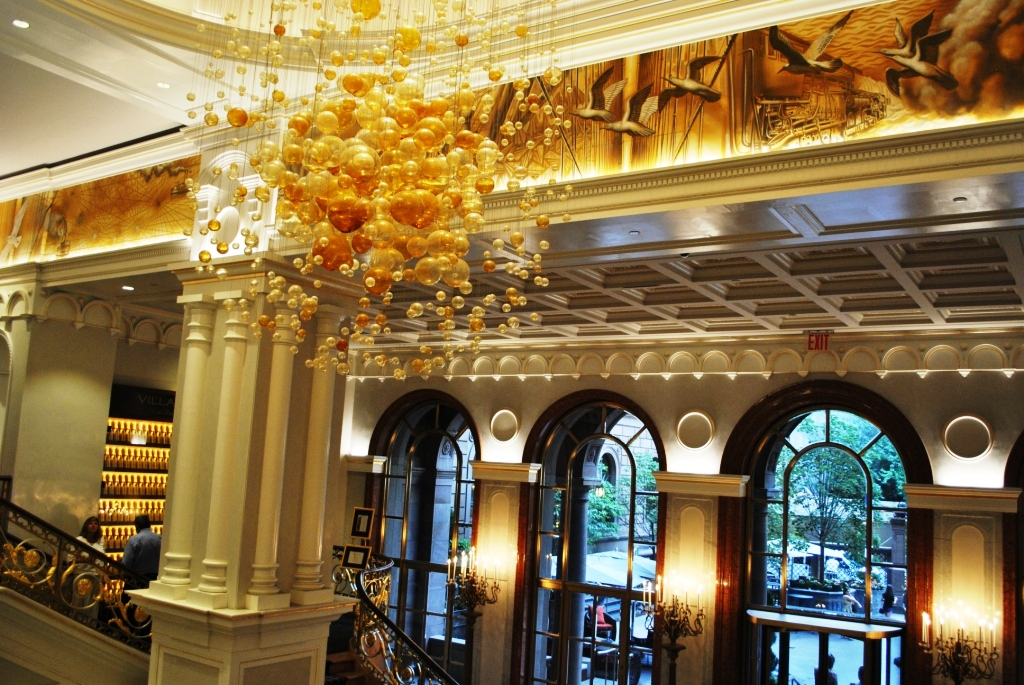
Interior of the lobby (originally the Villard Houses' center wing), facing the courtyard

In early 1974, the archdiocese was negotiating to sell developer Harry Helmsley the air rights above the Villard Houses. Helmsley planned to build a 50-story glass tower designed by Emery Roth & Sons. The transfer of air rights would allow the tower to be taller than would be usually allowed. The rear portion of the Villard Houses' center wing would need to be demolished, as well as part of a 1909 addition to the south wing. The arcaded entrance to the Villard Houses' center wing would be walled off. The north and south wings would remain unchanged and would not be part of the hotel. The LPC scheduled a meeting to discuss the plans in December 1974 because any alterations to the houses needed the agency's permission. One witness at the meeting was Villard's own great-grandson, shipping executive Vincent S. Villard, who testified that he wanted the "architectural gems" to be preserved. The commission demurred on approving Helmsley's plan at that time. Architectural writer Ada Louise Huxtable said the proposal was "a death-dealing rather than a life-giving 'solution'". By late 1974, the archdiocese had leased all of the Villard Houses to Helmsley for 99 years at around $1 million per year.

In January 1975, the LPC approved Helmsley's hotel proposal in principle but objected to some elements of the design. Roth's original plan had called for vertical travertine marble piers rising the height of the tower, which would be connected at the top by arches. The LPC requested that the curtain wall be designed less conspicuously. Though the houses' interiors were not protected as landmarks, the agency also asked Helmsley to consider preserving the interiors, which were planned to be demolished as part of Roth's plan. Helmsley had asked the firm Kahn & Jacobs to create an alternate design; his decision to commission two competing designs was unusual within the architectural community. The original iteration of the hotel plan entailed demolishing the Gold Room in the south wing, to which Community Planning Board 5 objected. A Helmsley-Spear vice president said the hotel's plans included a lobby on a lower elevation than the Gold Room and that, due to the slope of the site, the room would have to be demolished to make way for the lobby.

Following these objections, Helmsley presented a modified plan in June 1975, designed by the Roth firm. The new design of the tower included three arches on 50th and 51st Streets rising to the Villard Houses' roofs. The rest of the tower would contain horizontal bands of windows within a bronze cladding. The Gold Room, as well as parts of two of the residences, would still be demolished as part of the project. Huxtable spoke negatively of the revised plan, saying: "By any measure except computerized investment design, the results are a wretched failure." The same month, Planning Board 5 requested the archdiocese release records of its finances so the board could determine whether the archdiocese was allowed to lease the Villard Houses to Helmsley under a "hardship" preservation. The New York City Board of Standards and Appeals scheduled a public hearing for Helmsley's plan in July 1975. Just before the hearing was scheduled to occur, it was postponed to September because the archdiocese had not sufficiently advertised the hearing. Helmsley almost quit the development entirely because of these delays.

==== Further revisions and approval ====
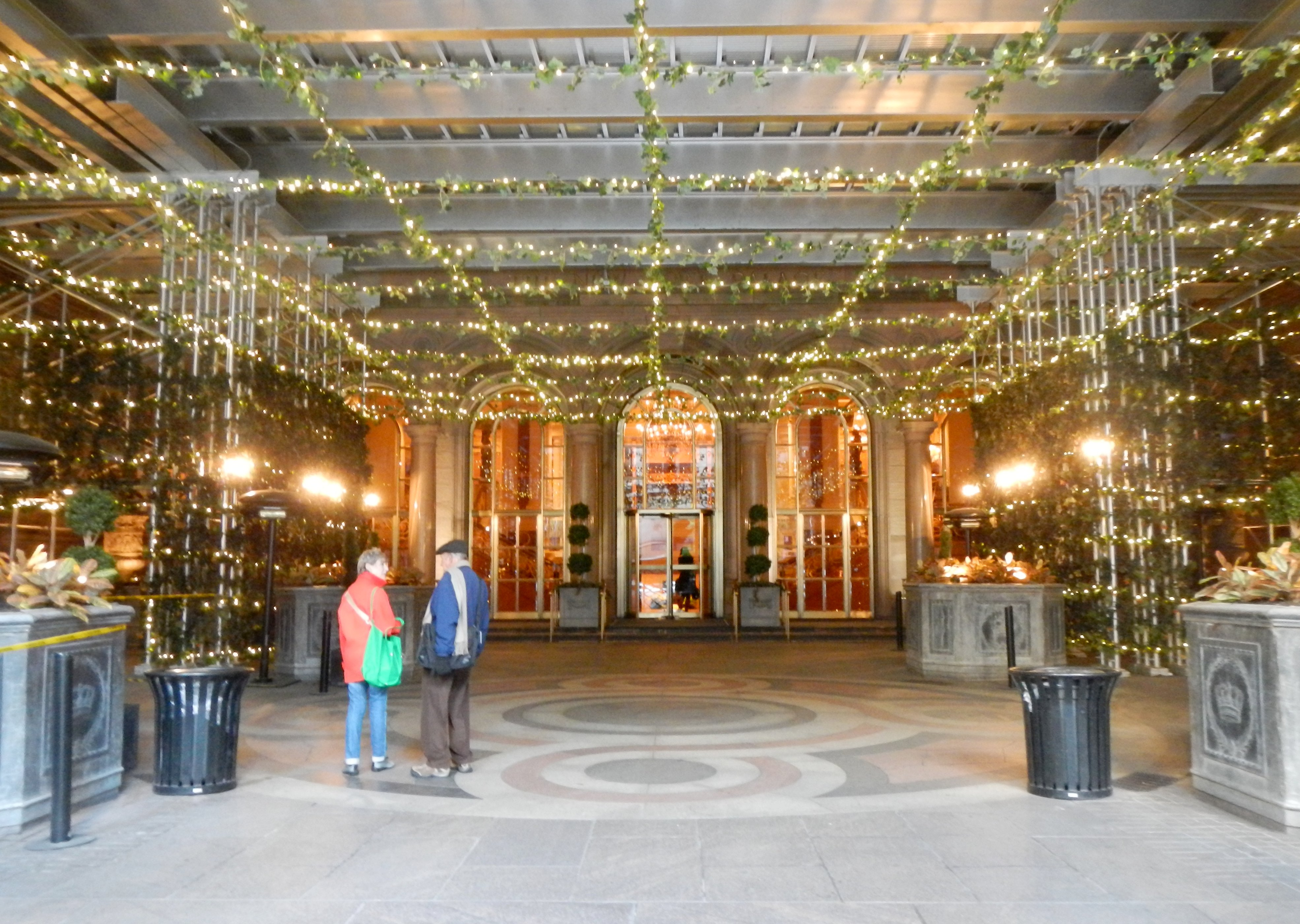
Courtyard of the Palace Hotel

The first economic details for the hotel were announced on August 31, 1975; at the time, the 725-room hotel was expected to cost $42 million. The Villard Houses were placed on the National Register of Historic Places on September 2, which restricted the use of federal funds to demolish any part of the houses without federal approval. Several days later, Helmsley presented yet another proposal for the hotel and withdrew the previous plans for the hotel. The new plans preserved the Gold Room as a cocktail lounge. The hotel would rise 57 stories with offices on nine stories and apartments on the top 10 stories. The hotel tower's facade was to be made of dark glass and aluminum panels, similar to what would ultimately be built. Huxtable said of the new proposal, "There is now the promise of a solution that all can abide by."

The archdiocese hired William Shopsin in January 1976 to conduct a historical survey of the Villard Houses. Shopsin recorded the houses' existing design components for the Historic American Buildings Survey. That April, the New York City Planning Commission proposed legislation that would allow new developments above official city landmarks, such as Helmsley's proposed hotel, to collect development "bonuses" in compensation for a reduction in the land lot due to the landmark's presence. The commission released draft legislation in early June 1976, which would enable the hotel to build 15–18 percent more interior space than would be normally allowed. Helmsley threatened to cancel the hotel if it was not approved within the month, since he was scheduled to pay $700,000 in annual real estate taxes starting on July 1. Later that month, Helmsley presented his updated proposal for the hotel, which had been reduced to 51 stories. There would be 775 rooms, but the amount of office space had been reduced by three-fourths. The hotel plans had been downsized because of the city's poor economic condition at the time. The development still received opposition from some critics who argued Midtown Manhattan had enough hotel space.

By that July, Helmsley and the archdiocese had agreed to preserve the Villard Houses' exterior and partial interior. The public would be able to access "significant interiors" such as the Gold Room, and restrictions would be placed on how these "significant" spaces could be used. Despite the opposition of two community planning boards, the City Planning Commission had ended all public comment on the hotel plan by September 1976. The commission approved the hotel on a 5–1 vote that month. The hotel received unanimous approval from the New York City Board of Estimate that October. The final plans called for 31 stories of hotel rooms and 13 1/2 stories of residential apartments. Darcy Lewis of the Society Against Villard's Extinction (SAVE), which opposed the hotel, called it "an esthetic abortion" that was akin to a "human abortion". SAVE, whose members included Henry Villard's great-grandson Dimitri Villard, contemplated delaying construction by, among other things, filing a lawsuit and asking the U.S. federal government to take office space in the Villard Houses.

==== Construction ====
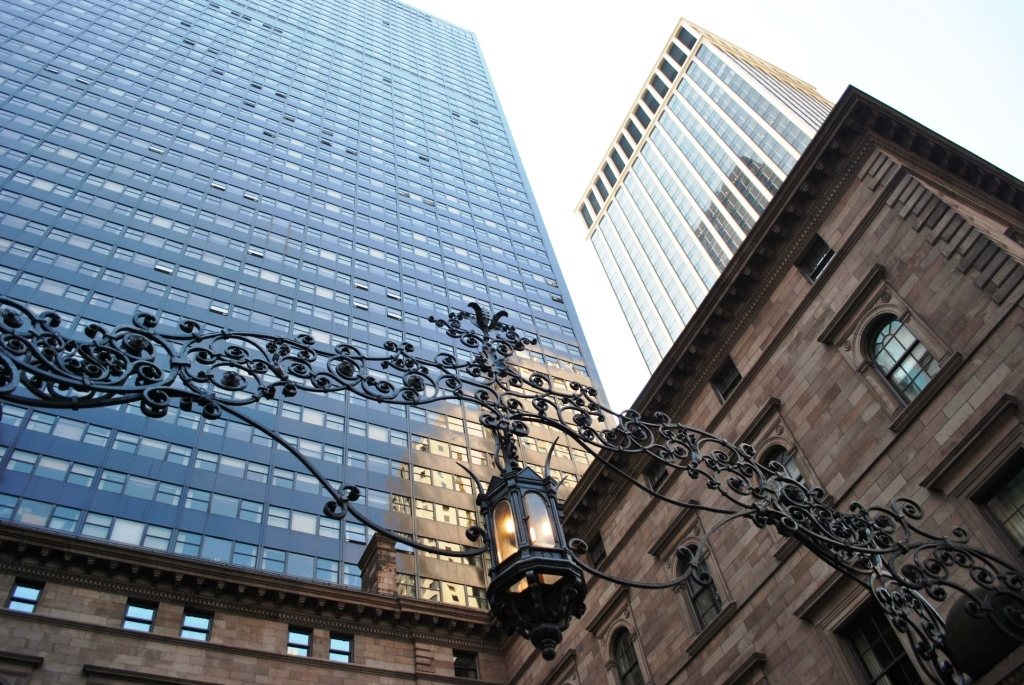
Looking up at the Palace Hotel's skyscraper addition

In early 1977, Emery Roth & Son hired James W. Rhodes as an architectural consultant for the project. Morse-Diesel Inc. was hired as the general contractor for the hotel by mid-1977, and demolition of existing structures on the site was expected to begin later that year. The city granted the hotel a tax abatement in September 1977, allowing construction to proceed after three years. The approvals for the hotel had ultimately involved 75 meetings and 15 public hearings. Helmsley provided $25 million of the hotel's projected $75 million construction cost, and he borrowed the remainder from MetLife and MassMutual, two insurance companies. Upon its predicted completion in 1980, the hotel was to be the city's tallest, as well as the first luxury hotel to open in the city since 1971. In the two and a half years before construction started, the archdiocese had been obliged to pay $800,000 per year in taxes because the vacant houses were no longer tax-exempt. Helmsley had paid half of this cost.

A groundbreaking ceremony for the hotel occurred on January 25, 1978. The site of the hotel's tower had yet to be cleared at that time. A ditch was excavated between the Villard Houses and the tower's site, isolating work on the two structures. The latter was excavated using small blasts, and seismographs were installed in the houses to record any effects of blasting. The decorative interiors of the Villard Houses were taken apart by hand and placed into temporary storage. For comparison purposes, photographs of the interior were taken before the decorations were disassembled and after they were reassembled. Interior designer Sarah Lee was largely responsible for the redesign of the historical interiors. The Gold Room was renovated and turned into a cocktail lounge. The lobby was renovated with marble and wood paneling as well as gilded columns, while the old library was refurbished with 4,000 false books. The old drawing-room of the south wing was redesigned as a cocktail lounge as well, while the old dining room became the hotel's Hunt Bar. The houses' facade and courtyard were also restored, though the easternmost section of the complex was demolished. The project also involved replacing some city streetlights outside the Villard Houses.

In June 1979, Helmsley leased 30,000 square feet (2,800 m^{2}) in the Villard House's north wing to Jacqueline Kennedy Onassis. The space was to contain the Urban Center, the headquarters of four civic organizations. Two months later, Capital Cities Communications, which had been a tenant in one of the Villard Houses on 24 East 51st Street, leased space in the tower. During the hotel's construction, one of the houses' roofs was damaged that October when a heavy object fell through it. The Urban Center's space ultimately opened in August 1980, while its bookstore opened that October. According to Huxtable, despite Helmsley's initial opposition to the houses' preservation, he ultimately concluded that the restoration of the houses "justified the money and effort, both as an investment and in the degree of value-added beauty and style obtained for the hotel."

=== Helmsley ownership ===
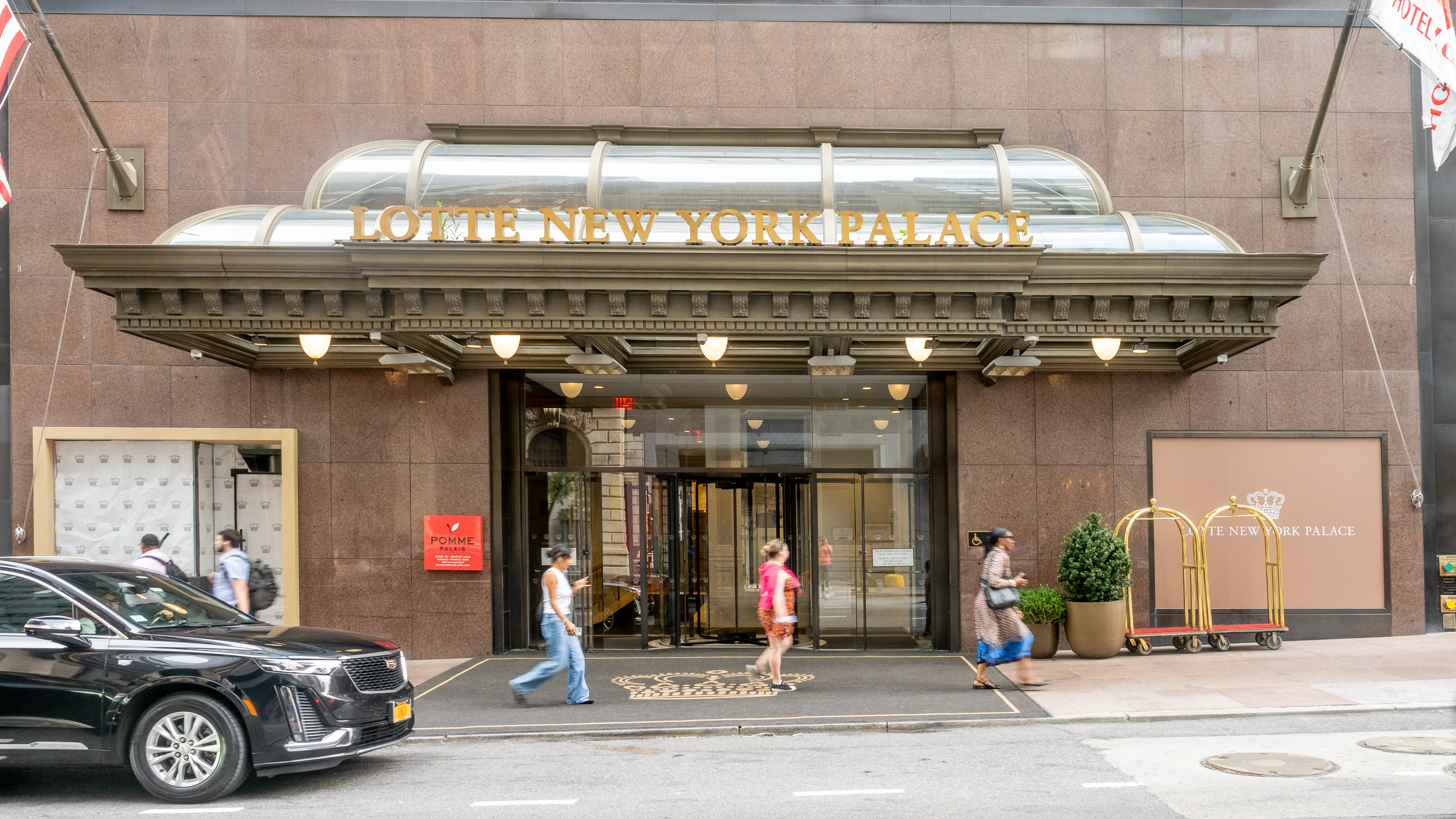
Entrance from 51st Street

The Palace Hotel opened on September 15, 1980; at the time, only the 10th through 23rd floors were ready for occupancy. The Palace Hotel was one of 13 large hotels, with a combined 9,000 rooms, that had opened in New York City during the early 1980s. Christopher Gray of The New York Times disapproved of the tower, saying that it "has absolutely none of the quality of the older building to which it is joined", but he described the Villard rooms as "the finest public rooms of any hotel in New York". Thomas Hine, a reporter for the Hartford Courant, said the Helmsley Palace "has something to show for its claim to being the best New York has to offer", though he felt the tower reduced the appearance of the houses. Upon its opening, many potential guests of the Palace Hotel mistakenly contacted a similarly named budget hostelry at 315 Bowery, prompting complaints from the latter's operators. To avoid confusion, the Madison Avenue hotel was renamed the Helmsley Palace Hotel. By the end of 1980, half of the 947 rooms were ready for occupancy, and the completed rooms had an occupancy rate of 80 percent, despite a downturn in the hospitality industry. The Helmsley Palace had to reject some potential guests, such as Charles, Prince of Wales, because of a lack of available space.

The hotel began to lose money the following year, with losses of over $1 million in each of the first three months of 1981. Furthermore, the Helmsley Palace had overrun its construction budget. A limited partnership agreed to give up to $23 million for the hotel, but the investors refused Harry Helmsley's request for a $20 million second mortgage. The limited investors sued Harry Helmsley in 1982 over the hotel's inflated costs, alleging that he acquired hotel furnishings and equipment at great profit to his own companies. A New York state judge ruled that Harry Helmsley had to refund the investors $3.5 million. The finances of the Helmsley Palace were not publicly revealed, but the hotel's spokespersons maintained that it was still performing well financially, despite a general economic recession. Crain's New York magazine characterized the operation of the Helmsley Palace as "an obsession" of Harry and Leona Helmsley, who would visit the hotel every day. Leona Helmsley maintained a strict and intolerant management style that involved firing staff members for trivial mistakes. According to a 1990 biography, staff developed a coded warning system to alert each other whenever she was nearby.

By the late 1980s, the Helmsley Palace consistently had a lower occupancy rate than similar luxury hotels in midtown despite charging above-average rates. In 1988, U.S. Attorney Rudy Giuliani indicted the Helmsleys on several tax-related charges, as well as extortion. At the time, Leona was gaining more control over the hotel after Harry had suffered a stroke. The next year, Leona Helmsley was convicted of tax evasion and several other charges and was sentenced to prison. The hotel's limited partners Lepercq, de Neuflize & Co. attempted to seek arbitration in February 1990 to take majority ownership of the hotel from the Helmsleys. The limited partners said the hotel had gone through six general managers as well as seven directors of food and drink in ten years. The limited partners claimed that Leona Helmsley's conviction was part of the reason behind the hotel's declining finances. The hotel recorded a net loss of $10 million during 1991.

=== Receivership and Brunei ownership ===
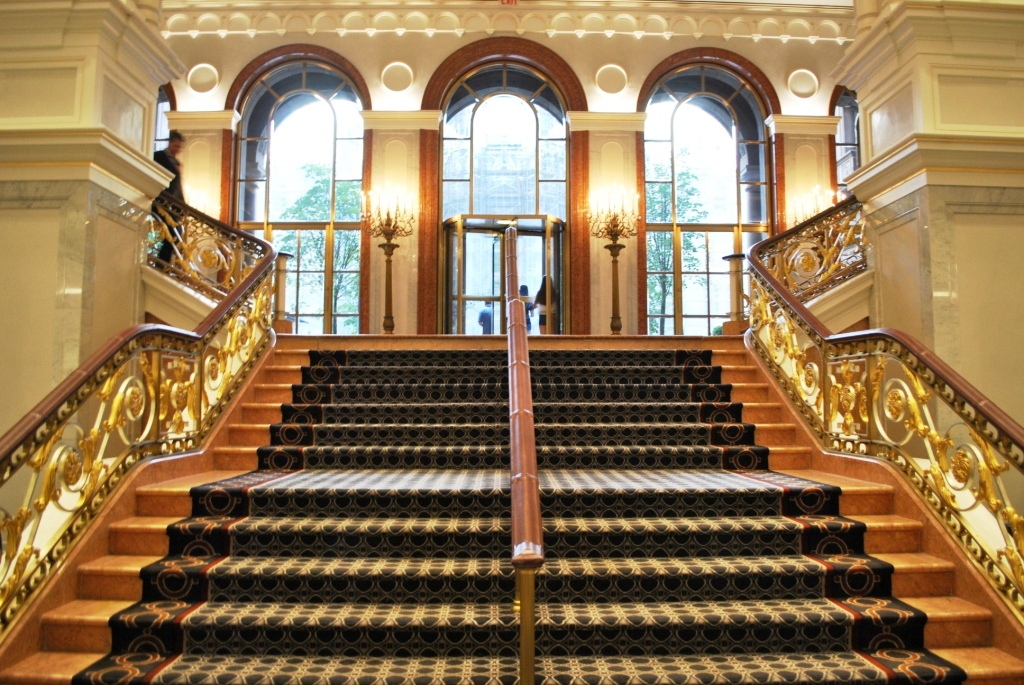
The lobby staircase in what was formerly the center wing of the Villard Houses

An arbitration panel for the New York Supreme Court appointed a third-party receiver in July 1992 to manage the hotel. The Helmsleys appealed the receivership for several months, even as the receivers were seeking a second mortgage loan of $7.5 million. After the second mortgage offer was withdrawn over concerns that the Helmsleys did not waive their right to challenge it, the Helmsleys dropped their appeal in April 1993. Leona Helmsley reportedly requested that people not mention the Palace Hotel in her presence because, according to Crain's New York, she was "distraught" over the possibility of losing control. The receiver had found a buyer for the hotel by October 1993, just as Leona Helmsley was to be released from prison. Amedeo Hotels Limited Partnership, a private limited partnership owned by the family of Bruneian sultan Hassanal Bolkiah, agreed to buy the Helmsley Palace. The sale was finalized at the end of that December for $200 million.

By 1995, the New York Palace had offered to provide a restaurant space for Le Cirque, though Le Cirque's owner Sirio Maccioni initially was hesitant to do so. In June 1996, Amedeo hired Lee Jablin of Harman Jablin Architects for a renovation of the hotel and Villard Houses. The renovation was to reduce the number of rooms from 1,050 to 900 and would add 14 suites, a gym, and conference areas. Jablin would redesign the lobby in the Villard Houses, while Le Cirque would take up the Gold Room and other rooms in the south wing. A Mediterranean restaurant named Istana opened in March 1997 near the 51st Street lobby entrance, and the new Le Cirque location opened the next month. Adam D. Tihany designed the Le Cirque space with multicolored coverings over the previous interiors. The suites were redesigned by Pierre Court, who designed four 4,000-square-foot (370 m^{2}) triplex units in the tower, all with nautical decorations. The rooms on the tower's 41st through 55th floors were branded as the Towers, and the interiors were redesigned with both modern and traditional decorations. The hotel remained open during the renovation, which was completed in late 1997.

A dispute arose in the late 1990s when Sultan Bolkiah alleged his brother Prince Jefri was misappropriating state funds to pay for his own personal investments. In 2000, a Bruneian court authorized the government of Brunei to take over the New York Palace. Amedeo filed a lawsuit in the New York Supreme Court, arguing that the Bruneian court's ruling should not be enacted because it would give the Bruneian government majority control of the hotel. A further dispute occurred the same year when the archdiocese was scheduled to increase the annual rent under the New York Palace and the Villard Houses. The royal family of Brunei argued that the houses reduced the hotel's value and would only pay $4.5 million, while the archdiocese wanted $9 million. Le Cirque was replaced by another restaurant, Gilt, in 2005. The Bruneian legal disputes continued until 2007 when a British court ruled that Jefri had to abide by the 2000 court ruling from the Bruneian court, and by extension, hand over control of the New York Palace to the Bruneian government. In early 2008, the Brunei Investment Agency acquired the hotel from Jefri. The Municipal Art Society moved out of the Villard Houses' north wing in 2009.

=== Northwood ownership ===
Northwood Investors, an American real estate investment firm, bought the hotel from the Sultan of Brunei in May 2011 for $400 million. The deal valued each of the hotel's 889 units at $445,000. As a term of the sale, Northwood was to pay the Archdiocese of New York $10 million annually for the ground lease. The sale was one of the largest real-estate transactions in New York City during 2011.

Northwood then spent $140 million on refurbishing the hotel. Jeffrey Beers International, as well as Amy Beckman of HOK, renovated the hotel's lobby, bars, restaurants, and specialty suites. All of the guest rooms received new decorations, and a reception area was built near the 50th Street entrance. The hotel also opened two eateries, both operated by Michel Richard: a restaurant named Villard Michel Richard, after the Villard Houses, as well as a marketplace named Pomme Palais, a reference to New York City's nickname "Big Apple". The New York Palace retained eight specialty suites, including the four triplexes, but two of the specialty suites became branded luxury suites. The hotel's new owners sought to lease the Villard Houses' north wing for at least $2,000 per square foot ($22,000/m^{2}) per year. The renovation was completed in September 2013. The Trouble's Trust bar opened shortly afterward.

=== Lotte ownership ===
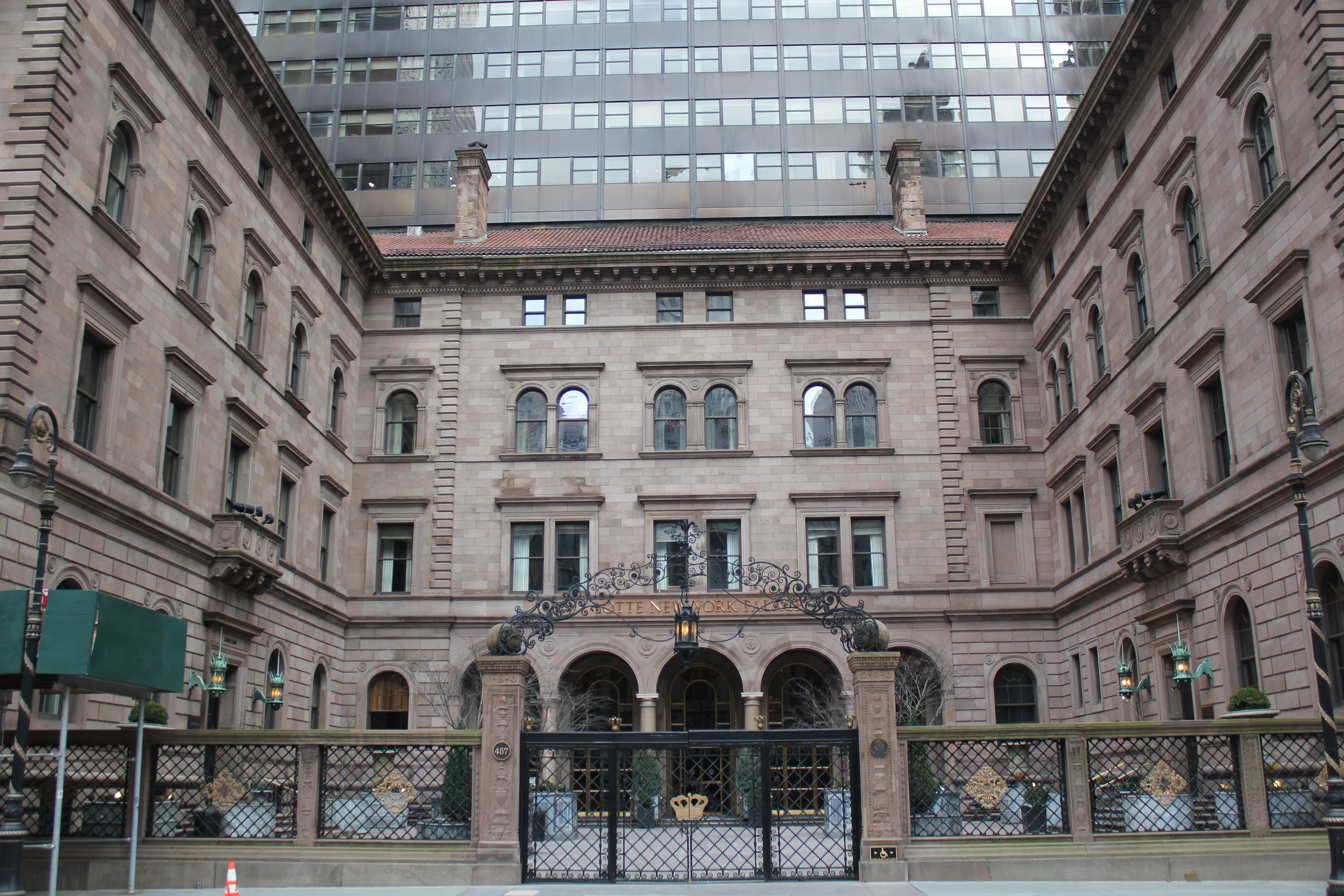
The Villard Houses section of the New York Palace Hotel, seen in early 2021

In May 2015, South Korean luxury hotel operator Lotte Hotels & Resorts agreed to buy the hotel building for $805 million. The chain also signed an underlying lease for the land, which had to be renegotiated with the archdiocese every 25 years. At the time, the hotel had 1,232 rooms. The hotel was to undergo a major renovation that included converting some units to condominiums. Lotte Hotels & Resorts completed the acquisition on August 28, 2015, and the property was renamed the Lotte New York Palace Hotel. Lotte New York Palace Hotel rented out some of the rooms in the southern wing of the Villard Houses in 2016. A restaurant named Villard opened the same year within the southern wing, and Pomme Palais reopened the following year.

In 2017, the Archdiocese of New York mortgaged the land under the Lotte New York Palace Hotel and the Villard Houses for $100 million to pay settlements to Catholic sexual abuse victims. The Gold Room restaurant was opened in 2019 within the room of the same name. The Ila Spa, designed by Anthony DiGuiseppe, opened on the eighth floor of the hotel the same year. The four triplex units were refurbished and reopened in 2020. Lotte Hotels & Resorts announced in December 2025 that it would purchase the underlying land for $490 million; the archdiocese used $200 million of the sale proceeds to pay settlements to sexual-abuse victims.

== Guests and events ==
Rudy Giuliani, while serving as the mayor of New York City, had a suite in the New York Palace in the early 2000s. Baseball player Derek Jeter had a temporary residence in the hotel, while musicians Michael Jackson and Whitney Houston also stayed there as a vacation home. The hotel has also hosted world leaders. In 2005, the President of the Congo, Denis Sassou-Nguesso, stayed in one of the triplexes for $8,500 per night while visiting the headquarters of the United Nations. Other world leaders to have stayed at the hotel include Indian Prime Minister Narendra Modi, U.S. Presidents Barack Obama, and Donald Trump. The United States Department of State announced in 2015 that, during meetings of the United Nations General Assembly, it would have a headquarters at the New York Palace Hotel rather than at the Waldorf Astoria New York.

In the 2000s, the hotel was popularized by the TV show Gossip Girl, where it was depicted as the residence of Blake Lively's character Serena van der Woodsen. The hotel sold two tiers of Gossip Girl-themed vacation packages in the 2010s; the less expensive tier contained memorabilia, a list of filming locations, and discounts for Gossip Girl tour passes, while the more expensive tier was only sold when the Jewel or Champagne suites were booked. In 2017, magician Steve Cohen started performing his show Chamber Magic at the Lotte New York Palace five times a week. Since then, the shows have frequently sold out, with tickets being priced at between $100 and $150 each. The hotel has also hosted historical tours of the Villard Houses. In 2025, as part of a partnership with the producers of the Broadway musical Wicked, the Lotte New York Palace Hotel offered Wicked–themed room packages.

== See also ==
- List of hotels in New York City
