= Lee Jablin =

American architect

Lee S Jablin
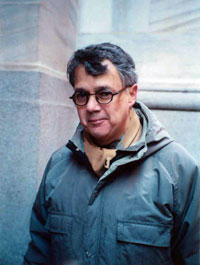
- Born: February 7, 1949; New York City, U.S.
- Occupation: Architect

Lee Jablin (born February 7, 1949) is an architect of international projects. Assembling and leading teams of engineers and consultants, he designs and constructs buildings.

== Education ==
Jablin holds degrees from Cornell University and Harvard University and was named a Harvard University Fellow. He received the Eidlitz Traveling Fellowship and the York Prize from Cornell University. Jablin has taught at Harvard University, Cornell University, and Hampton Institute and lectured at Columbia University.

== Career ==
His practice of architecture is broad, providing design for the hospitality industry, high-rise office and apartment houses, and integration of structural, mechanical and exterior wall systems. Jablin's designs incorporate historic preservation, building reimagination and best sustainable methods.

Lee Jablin is a founding partner of Harman Jablin Architects. He has worked with Warren Platner (Windows On The World), Ulrich Franzen (Phillip Morris World Headquarters, Miller Brewing Company, Champion International), and Der Scutt (Hong Kong and Shanghai Banking Corporation Headquarters N.A.).

Jablin is registered to practice architecture in numerous states, nationally NCARB certified, and a LEED accredited professional for high performance sustainable design.

== Works ==
Jablin's projects have included the Waldorf-Astoria Hotel, The New York Palace, the Harvard Club of New York City, 3 Lincoln Center, Bouley International, Le Cirque, The Mercer, Soho House, and 55 Water Street.

== Organizations ==
Jablin is a member of the Municipal Art Society, the Architectural League, the American Institute of Architects, the New York Society of Architects, and the U.S. Green Building Council. He served Cornell University on the Trustee Nominating Committee, the University Library Advisory Council, and the College of Architecture, Art & Planning Advisory Council; Harvard Club Board of Managers; supporting Friends of Poplar Forest, Save Venice, and Poets House; and lending his collection of Architectural rare books and materials, and his Wiener Werkstätte Ceramics collection to museums.
