= Paley Park =

Park in Manhattan, New York

Coordinates: 40°45′37″N 73°58′30.4″W

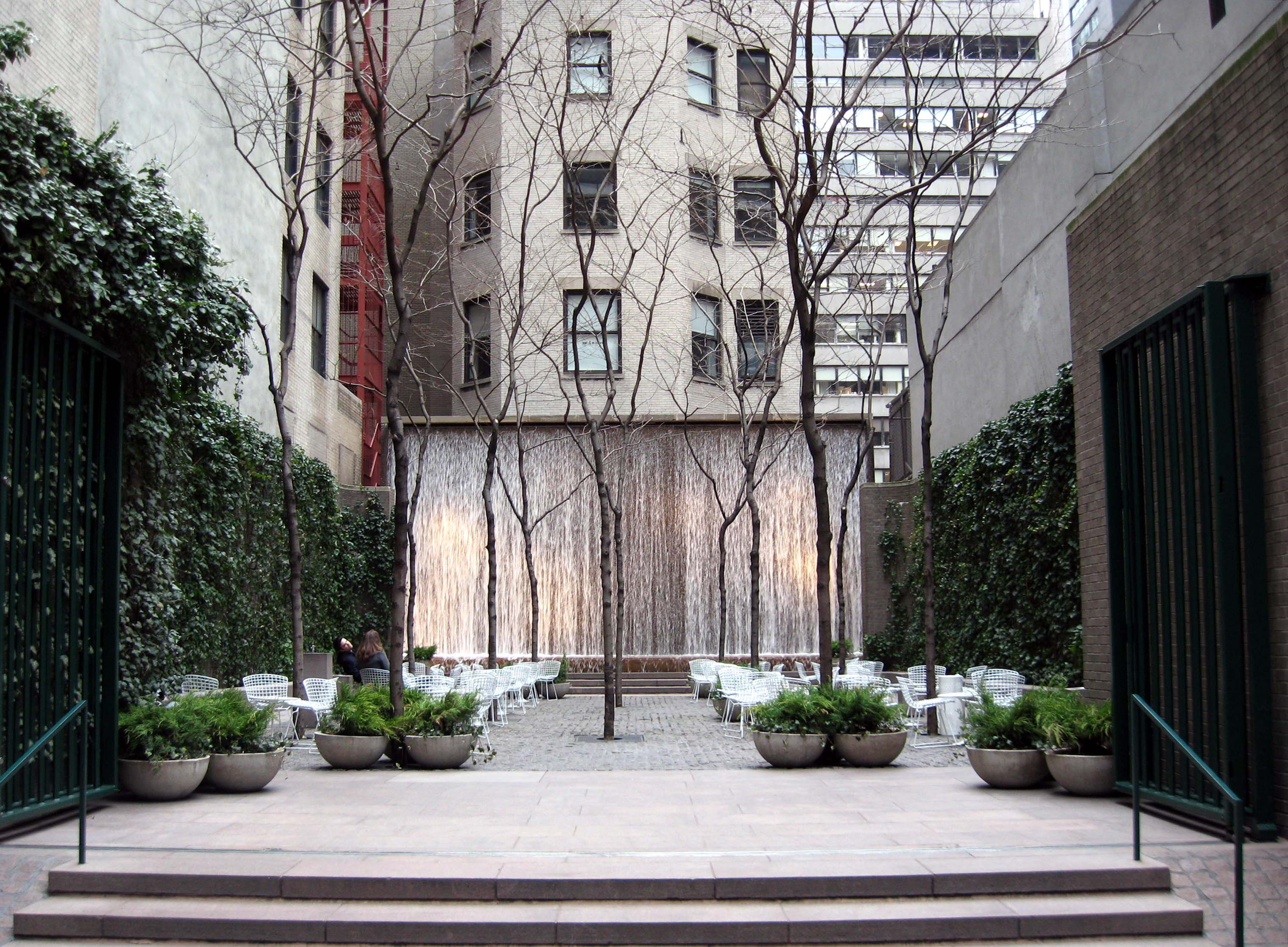
- Paley Park in winter
- Interactive map of Paley Park
- Location: 3–5 East 53rd Street
- Nearest city: New York City
- Area: 390 square metres (4,200 ft^{2})
- Founder: William S Paley Foundation
- Designer: Zion & Breen Associates
- Owner: The Greenpark Foundation, Inc.
- Open: 23 May 1967
- Water: Waterfall
- Vegetation: Honey Locusts
- Website: https://www.paleypark.org/

Paley Park is a pocket park located at 3 East 53rd Street between Madison and Fifth Avenues in Midtown Manhattan, New York City, on the former site of the Stork Club. Designed by the landscape architectural firm of Zion Breen Richardson Associates, it opened May 23, 1967. Paley Park is often cited as one of the finest urban spaces in the United States.

== Background ==
=== Establishment of the park ===
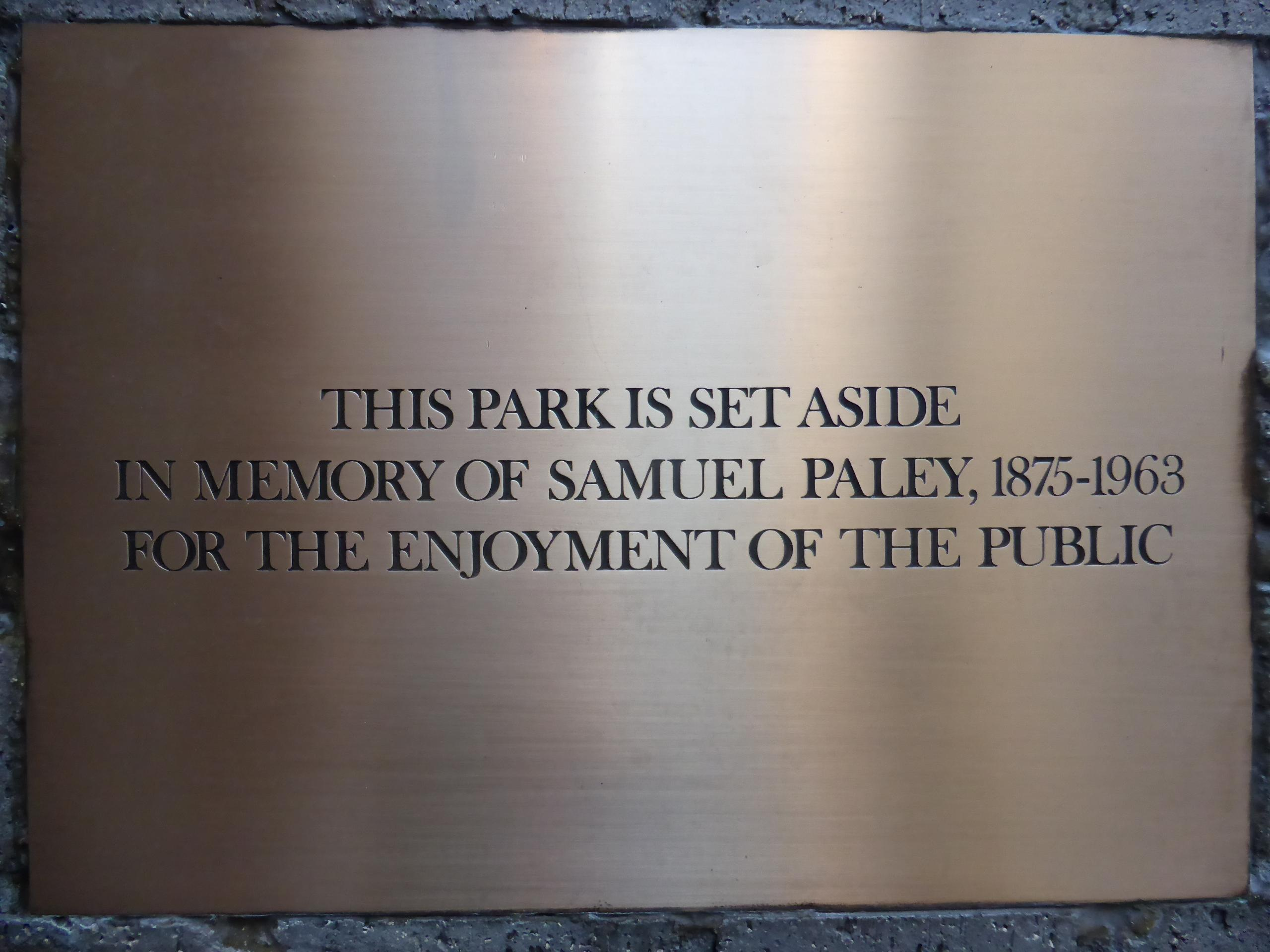
Plaque

A privately owned public space, Paley Park was financed by the William S. Paley Foundation and was named by Paley for his father, Samuel Paley. A plaque near the entrance reads: "This park is set aside in memory of Samuel Paley, 1875–1963, for the enjoyment of the public." The Paley Center for Media was originally located next to Paley Park in the 17 storey office building at One East 53rd Street.

=== Design ===
Measuring 4,200 square feet (390 m^{2}), the park contains airy trees, lightweight furniture and simple spatial organization. A 20-foot (6.1 m) high waterfall, with a capacity of 1,800 US gallons (6,800 L) per minute, spans the rear boundary of the park. The waterfall creates a backdrop of grey noise that masks the sounds of the city. The park is surrounded by walls on three sides and is open to the street (with an ornamental gate) on the fourth side, facing the street. Twelve honey locust trees were planted in the park at 12-foot (3.7 m) intervals and five in the footpath pavement. The green of the ivy−covered side walls ('vertical lawns') of English Ivy and Thorndale Ivy (Hedera helix 'Thorndale') contrast with colorful flowers.

Finnish−American architect Eero Saarinen designed the tables and Italian−American sculptor Harry Bertoia designed the wire framed chairs (Bertoia Side Chairs by Knoll in white), which have been used in the park since its first opening.

A wheelchair ramp is positioned on either side of the four steps that lead into the park which is elevated from the sidewalk level. The park displays a unique blend of materials, textures, colors and sounds. The wire mesh chairs and marble tables are light, while the ground surfaces are rough-hewn granite pavers which extend across the sidewalk to the street curb.

== Impact ==
In 1968, Paley Park and the Ford Foundation Building shared an Albert S. Bard Civic Award, distributed to structures that exhibited "excellence in architecture and urban design".

Social interaction in the park was analyzed in the 1980 book and film The Social Life of Small Urban Spaces by William H. Whyte.

== See also ==
- Greenacre Park
- Project for Public Spaces
- List of privately owned public spaces in New York City
