= The Social Life of Small Urban Spaces =

1980 book and film by William H. Whyte

- Front of the 2001 edition
- Author: William H. Whyte
- Cover artist: Sally A. Janin
- Language: English
- Subject: Urban design, human behaviour, public space, placemaking
- Genre: Urban design, landscape architecture, architecture
- Set in: New York City
- Publisher: Project for Public Spaces
- Publication date: 1980
- Publication place: United States of America
- Media type: Book and film
- Pages: 125
- ISBN: 097063241X

The Social Life of Small Urban Spaces is a 1980 book and a film by US sociologist William H. Whyte that records and analyses human behaviour in public space through a number of case studies in Manhattan, New York.

== Background ==
The book and film describe Whyte's analytical process and approach to evaluating and understanding a series of public spaces, mostly small parks, squares and office tower plazas in Manhattan, New York City. The book summarised research undertaken as part of the Street Life Project for the New York City Planning Commission that Whyte had collated since 1969.

== Chapters ==
The book is set out with the following eleven thematic chapters:

1. The Life of Plazas
2. Sitting Space
3. Sun, Wind, Trees, Water
4. Food
5. The Street
6. The “Undesirables”
7. Effective Capacity
8. Indoor Spaces
9. Concourses and Megastructures
10. Smaller Cities and Places
11. Triangulation

== Public spaces analysed ==
A total of 18 small urban spaces in Manhattan were comparatively analysed. The majority of public spaces were located in Midtown Manhattan. Apart from the Rockefeller Center, all public spaces were built in the post World War II era and a majority are forecourts or public spaces associated with modern commercial office towers. Paley Park and Greenacre Park were included as they are predominantly paved public spaces in the city with similar patterns of use as the other 16 locations.

The following list shows the original collection name of each site in the first column as used in graphs and charts in the book. Where building names have changed since 1980 this is noted.

Sites in Manhattan recorded and analysed (listed in order of graphs published in book)
Name in book	Place	Building	Location	Type	Architect	Year
77 Water	77 Water Street	Seventy Seven Water	77 Water Street; Financial District, Manhattan, New York City	Public Spaces	Gensler	1970
Greenacre Park	Greenacre Park	—	217 East 51st Street, New York City	Pocket park with fountain	Hideo Sasaki	1971
Time-Life	Time Life Square	Time-Life Building	1271 Avenue of the Americas, Midtown Manhattan, New York City	Plaza	Wallace Harrison of Harrison, Abramovitz, and Harris	1960
Exxon	Exxon Plaza	Exxon Building (now 1251 Avenue of the Americas)	Rockefeller Center, 1251 Avenue of the Americas, New York City	Sunken plaza with large two-tier pool and fountains	Wallace Harrison	1971
Paley Park	Paley Park	—	3 East 53rd Street, New York City	Pocket park with fountain	Zion Breen Richardson Associates	1967
GM	GM Plaza	GM Building	767 Fifth Avenue, New York City	Plaza	Emery Roth & Sons	1968
Seagram's	Seagram Plaza	Seagram Building	375 Park Avenue, Midtown Manhattan, New York City	Plaza with water	Ludwig Mies van der Rohe; Philip Johnson	1958
JC Penney	JC Penney Plaza	JC Penney Building (now 1301 Avenue of the Americas)	1301 Avenue of the Americas, New York City	Plaza	Shreve, Lamb & Harmon	1964
345 Park Avenue	345 Park Avenue Plaza	345 Park Avenue Building	345 Park Avenue, Midtown Manhattan, New York City	Plaza	Emery Roth & Sons	1969
Exxon Minipark	Exxon Building (now 1251 Avenue of the Americas)	1251 Avenue of the Americas	Rockefeller Center, 1251 Avenue of the Americas Midtown Manhattan, New York City	Pocket park with fountain	Wallace Harrison	1975
Burlington	Burlington House (former)	1345 Avenue of the Americas	1345 Avenue of the Americas Midtown Manhattan, New York City	Plaza with fountain	Emery Roth & Sons	1969
277 Park	277 Park Avenue	—	277 Park Avenue, Midtown Manhattan, New York City	Plaza	Emery Roth & Sons	1964
630 5th Avenue	5th Avenue plaza	International Building (Rockefeller Center)	Rockefeller Centre, 630 5th Avenue, Midtown Manhattan, New York City	Plaza	Raymond Hood	1935
CBS	CBS Plaza	CBS Building	51 West 52nd Street, Midtown Manhattan, New York City	Plaza	Eero Saarinen	1965
Pan Am	Pan Am Plaza	Pan Am Building (now MetLife Building)	200 Park Avenue, New York City	Plaza	Emery Roth & Sons, Pietro Belluschi, and Walter Gropius	1963
ITT	ITT Plaza	ITT Building (Brown Rock)	1330 Sixth Avenue (Avenue of the Americas), New York City	Plaza	Emery Roth & Sons	1965
Lever House	Lever House Plaza	Lever House	390 Park Avenue, New York City	Plaza	Skidmore, Owings & Merrill	1952
280 Park	280 Park Plaza	Two Eighty Park Avenue	280 Park Avenue, New York City	Forecourt and sitting walls	Kohn Pedersen Fox Associates	1971

== Film version ==
In 1980 Whyte also released a documentary film with the same title as the 1980 book. On release the 16mm film could be purchased for $750 or hired for $75 on two reels from the Municipal Art Society of New York.

In 1981 a lightly re-edited version was made by Nova for broadcast on PBS, titled "City Spaces, Human Places".

The film serves as a prominent inspiration for filmmaker John Wilson's HBO television show, How To with John Wilson. Wilson remarked: "William Whyte is a legendary people watcher who likes to study the subtle ways public space is used. I think about this film constantly whenever I’m out shooting."

In collaboration with the Municipal Art Society of New York and the Project for Public Spaces, Anthology Film Archives in New York City digitally restored the film in 2025 and announced a week-long revival run.

== See also ==
- Project for Public Spaces
- The Image of the City
- The Organization Man
- Jan Gehl
