= Is Anybody Listening =

Is Anybody Listening may refer to:

- Is Anybody Listening? (book), a 1952 book by William H. Whyte
- Is Anybody Listening?, a 1987 film directed by Saeed Akhtar Mirza
- "Is Anybody Listening?", an episode of Theodore Tugboat

In music:

- "Is Anybody Listening", a song by Brotha Lynch Hung and Doomsday Productions from The Plague
- "Is Anybody Listening", a song by Danity Kane from Welcome to the Dollhouse
- "Is Anybody Listening", a song by Forgiven Rival from This Is a War
- "Is Anybody Listening?", a song from The Ten Commandments: The Musical

== See also ==
- "Anybody Listening?", a song by Queensrÿche
- "Anybody Listening?", a song by Classified from Self Explanatory
- "Anybody Listening", a song by Suffrajett from Black Glitter
- "Is Anybody Listening To Me?", EP from Erin Bowman
