= Holly White =

Holly White may refer to:

- Holly White (sociologist) (1917–1999), American sociologist and author
- Holly White (Metal Gear), character in the video game Metal Gear 2: Solid Snake
- Holly White (Breaking Bad), character in the TV series Breaking Bad
