= Greenacre Park =

Privately owned park in Manhattan, New York

- U.S. National Register of Historic Places
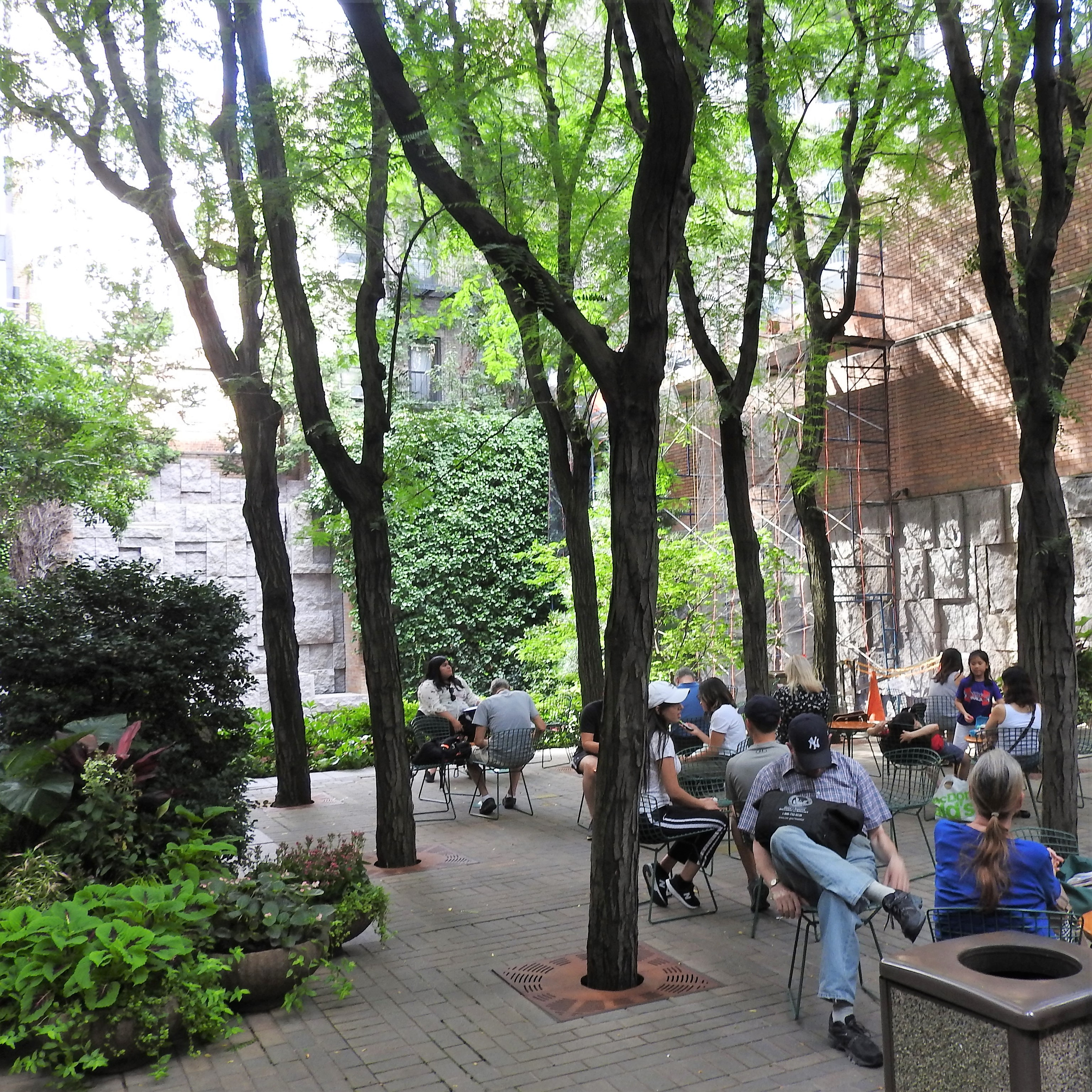
- (2018)

- Location within Manhattan Location within New York City Location within New York Location within the United States
- Location: 217 E. 51st St., New York, New York
- Coordinates: 40.756206°N 73.969248°W
- Built: 1971
- NRHP reference No.: 100002076
- Added to NRHP: February 2, 2018

Greenacre Park is a privately owned, publicly accessible vest-pocket park located on East 51st Street between Second and Third Avenues in the Turtle Bay neighborhood of Manhattan, New York City.

== Background ==
The park, which is owned by the Greenacre Foundation, was a 1971 gift from philanthropist Abby Rockefeller Mauzé, daughter of John D. Rockefeller Jr. and granddaughter of John D Rockefeller.

The park was designed by Hideo Sasaki, former chairman of Department of Landscape Architecture at Harvard, in consultation with architect Harmon Goldstone. The 6,360-square-foot (591 m^{2}) park was assembled from three lots, which had previously been occupied by a store, a garage, and part of a synagogue. It features a 25-foot (7.6 m) waterfall, a trellis with heat lamps for chilly days, chairs and tables, as well as honey locust trees, azaleas, and pansies, which together attract an average of 700 visitors a day.

In 1980, when a planned building would have blocked the park's sunlight, a campaign was launched to block the construction of the building. The park was analysed in the influential 1980 film and book by William H. Whyte about public places in Manhattan called The Social Life of Small Urban Spaces.

In May 2017, a city rezoning plan, which would allow the building of taller buildings nearby the park, caused a controversy when the Greenacre Foundation claimed that the taller buildings would put the park in shadow a great deal of time. A city shadow study indicated that the park would not be adversely affected by the rezoning, but a study commissioned by the Foundation claimed that buildings on six particular sites could put the park completely in the dark; because of this the Foundation called for height limitations on those sites. Their "Fight for Light" campaign was supported by the Municipal Art Society, Manhattan Borough President Gale Brewer, New Yorkers for Parks, and Daniel R. Garodnick, the city councilman in whose district the park is located. The rezoning plan was approved by the City Council in August 2017.

In 2018, it was listed on the National Register of Historic Places.

== See also ==
- List of privately owned public spaces in New York City
- National Register of Historic Places listings in Manhattan from 14th to 59th Streets
