= Placemaking =

Approach to public space design

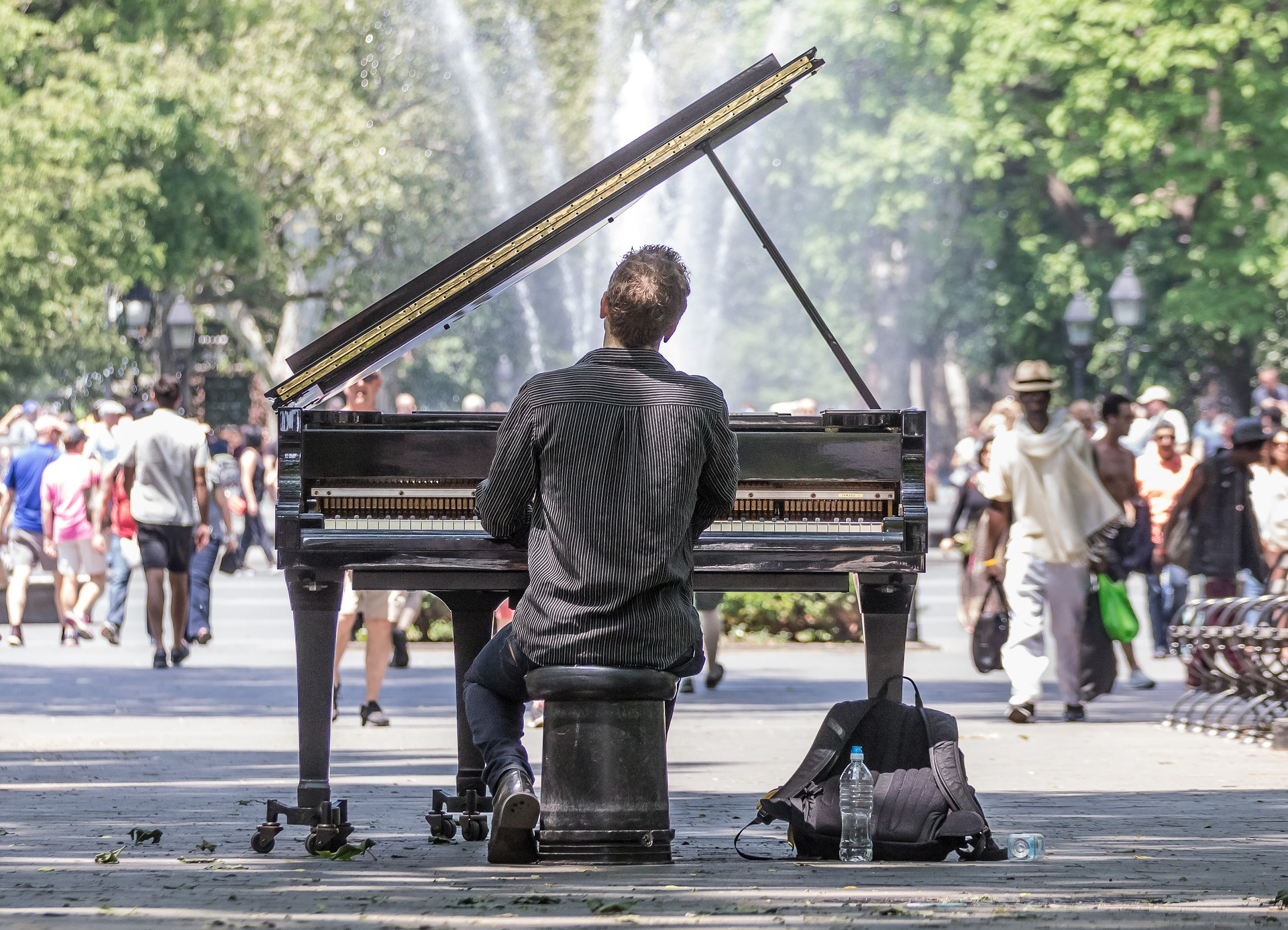
A pianist makes use of a public piano, effectively adding to the sense of place of Washington Square Park, Manhattan, New York.

Placemaking is a multi-disciplinary approach to the planning, design and management of public spaces that emphasizes community engagement, human-centered design, and the creation of meaningful, functional, and attractive environments. While placemaking encompasses a variety of methods and scales, it is characterized by improving urban vitality and strengthening place identity through a focus on people above physical structures or buildings.

The term originated in the late 20th century and gained prominence through the work of the nonprofit Project for Public Spaces and their multiple published guidelines and recommendations.

== Definition ==
Placemaking is an approach to the planning, design, and management of public spaces that seeks to create environments that are meaningful, accessible, and socially engaging for the communities that use them. It is commonly described as both a process and a philosophy, emphasizing the relationship between people and place rather than focusing solely on physical form or infrastructure.

Unlike conventional urban design practices that may prioritize large-scale planning frameworks or architectural form, placemaking typically stresses local participation, context-sensitive interventions, and the activation of public space through programming and social use. The concept is applied across a range of scales, from small neighborhood improvements to broader district-level initiatives.

The term is used in multiple ways across planning and design disciplines. In some contexts, it refers broadly to community-based public space improvement; in others, it encompasses arts-led development, tactical urban interventions, or economic revitalization strategies. Because of its wide adoption in both professional and policy discourse, the definition of placemaking varies, and scholars have noted that the term can function as an umbrella concept for diverse practices related to public space and community development.

== History ==
=== Precursors (1960s-1980s) ===
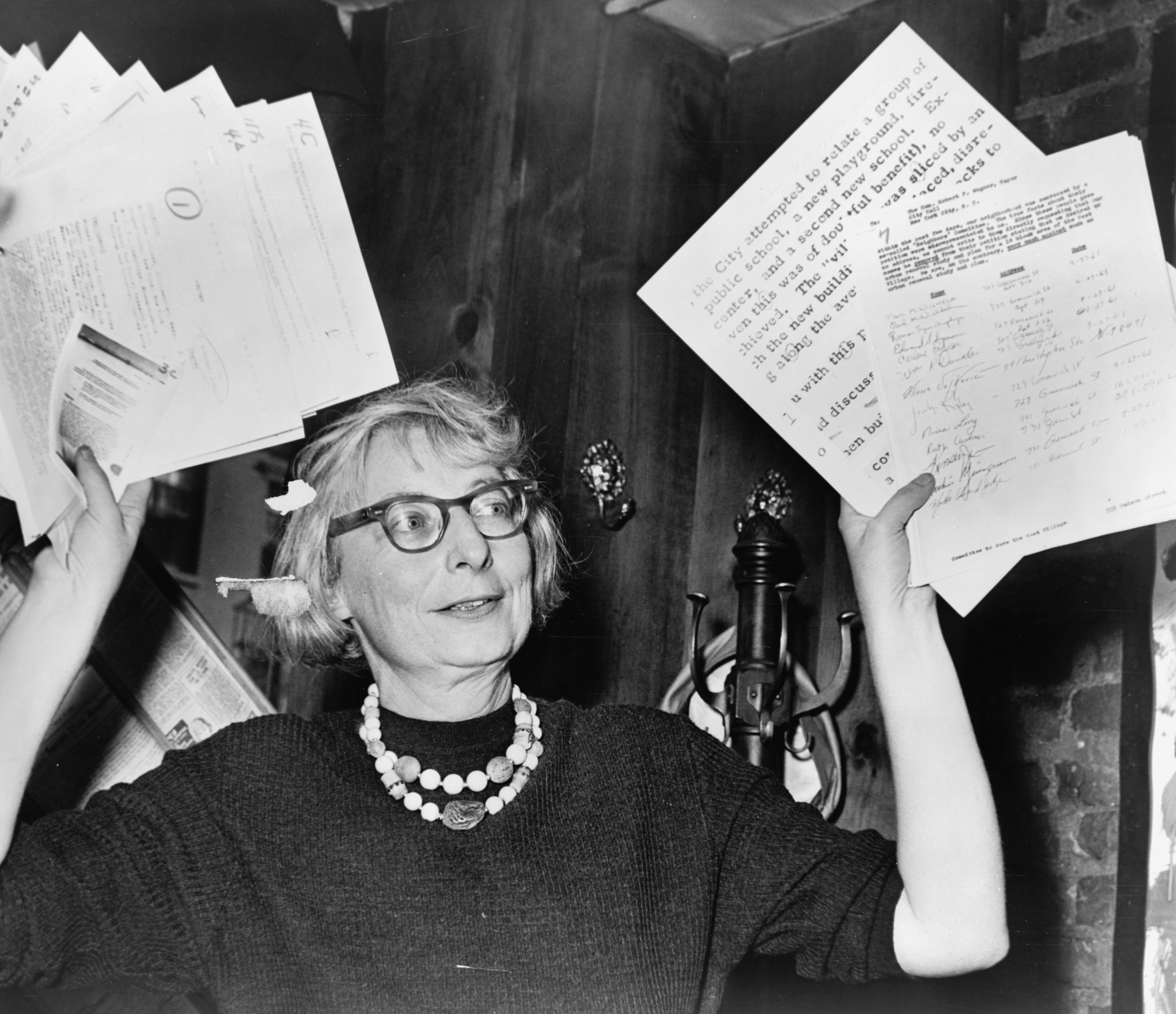
Jane Jacobs, chairman of the Comm. to save the West Village holds up documentary evidence at press conference at Lions Head Restaurant at Hudson & Charles Sts.

The idea of placemaking developed from mid-20th-century urban planning and design theory. It arose partly as a reaction against dominant modernist planning approaches, which were often criticized for producing urban environments that lacked vitality, social engagement, and human scale.

Jane Jacobs, William H. Whyte and Jan Gehl are often considered the main precursors of the placemaking movement. Through their work, these authors advocated for designing cities that put people above automobile connectivity and boost social life in public spaces.

=== Adoption of the term (1980s–onward) ===
In 1975, Fred Kent, who had collaborated with Whyte on a project studying pedestrian behavior in New York, founded the non-profit Project for Public Spaces (PPS), dedicated to creating public spaces though participatory design and placemaking.

Since then, other consultancies promoting placemaking ideals have been founded, such as STIPO in the Netherlands and Gehl Associates in Denmark. The term has also expanded, incorporating ideas related to supporting arts and culture, tourism, economic regeneration, the right to the city, and temporary placemaking interventions.

== Key Principles ==
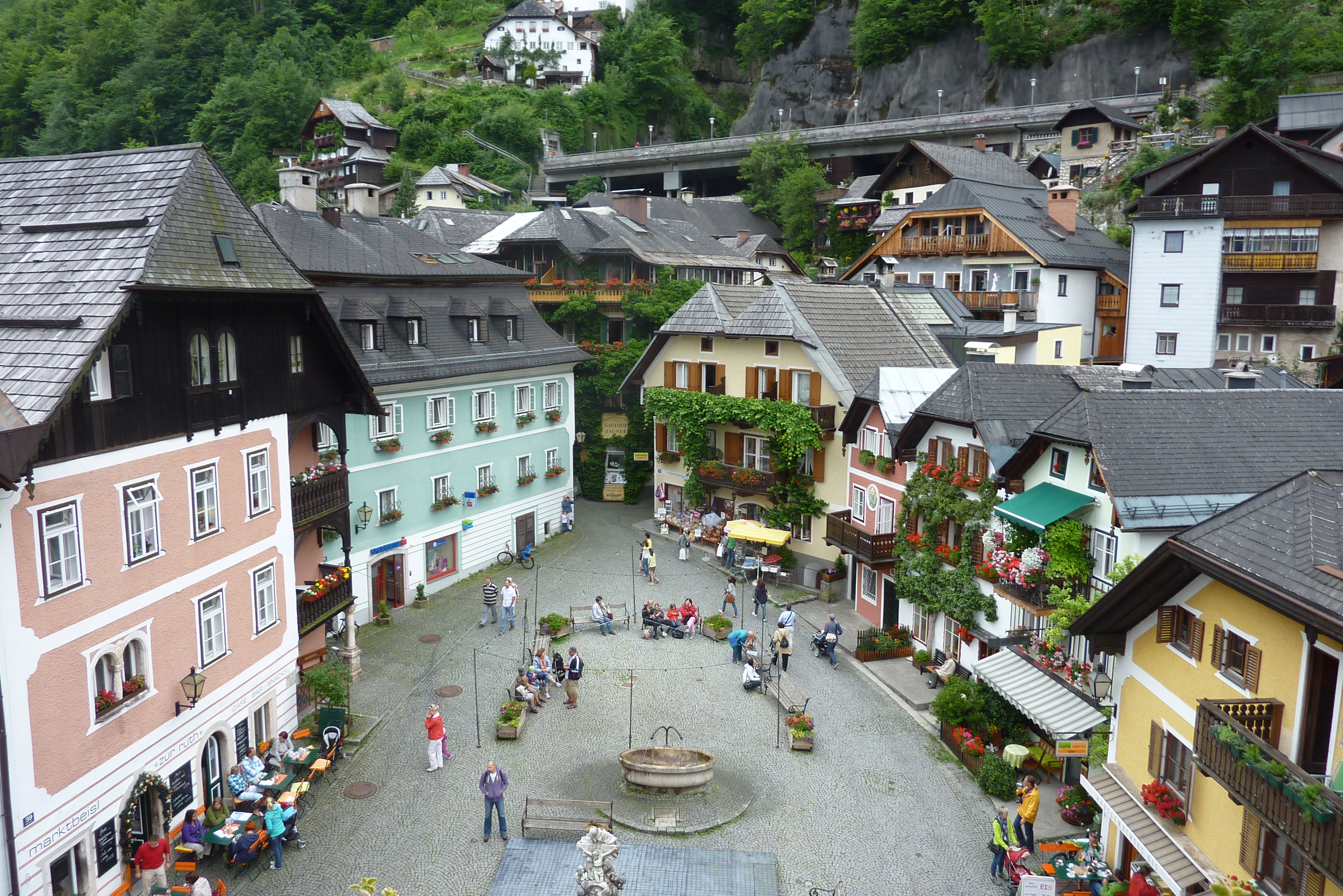
A plaza in Hallstatt Austria with an activated public realm.

=== Community Participation ===
Community participation is widely described as a central principle of placemaking. Many placemaking initiatives emphasize the involvement of local residents, stakeholders, and community organizations in the planning, design, and management of public spaces. This is usually achieved through varied participatory processes, such us public meetings, design workshops, charrettes, surveys, and collaborative mapping exercises, where the community members can serve as both consultants or co-creators. The emphasis on participation distinguishes placemaking from more centralized or top-down models in which decisions are primarily made by professional planners, designers, or public authorities

=== Human-scale public space design ===
We usually define placemaking as a community-led process, but another way to say this is that it is human-led. That is, change is driven by a group of individual human beings with names and connections to their physical surroundings built environment, not solely by trends in the real estate market, zoning laws, or large city agencies.

Placemaking typically approaches public spaces at a human scale, prioritizing environments that support pedestrian activity, social interaction, and everyday public life. These principles are not limited by the scale of intervention and may be applied in a range of contexts, including interior spaces, individual sites, neighborhoods, and broader communities. In practice, placemaking strategies may take many forms, ranging from small-scale physical improvements—such as the addition of seating, shade, or landscaping—to larger interventions such as mixed-use development policies or public space revitalization programs.

=== Quality places ===
Despite the wide variety of approaches to Placemaking, its overarching aim is commonly described as the creation of "quality places" characterized by a strong sense of place. These environments are understood as spaces that attract people and foster a sese of attachment among those who use them.

Across Placemaking practices, "quality places" share the following characteristics:

- Preservation and value of cultural, built and natural heritage;
- Diverse functions and activities;
- Highly adaptable to long-term socioeconomic changes;
- Accessible within and between public spaces, through well connected networks that prioritize walking, cycling and public transport;
- Coherent, legible and attractive

== Specialized Placemaking ==
=== Creative Placemaking ===
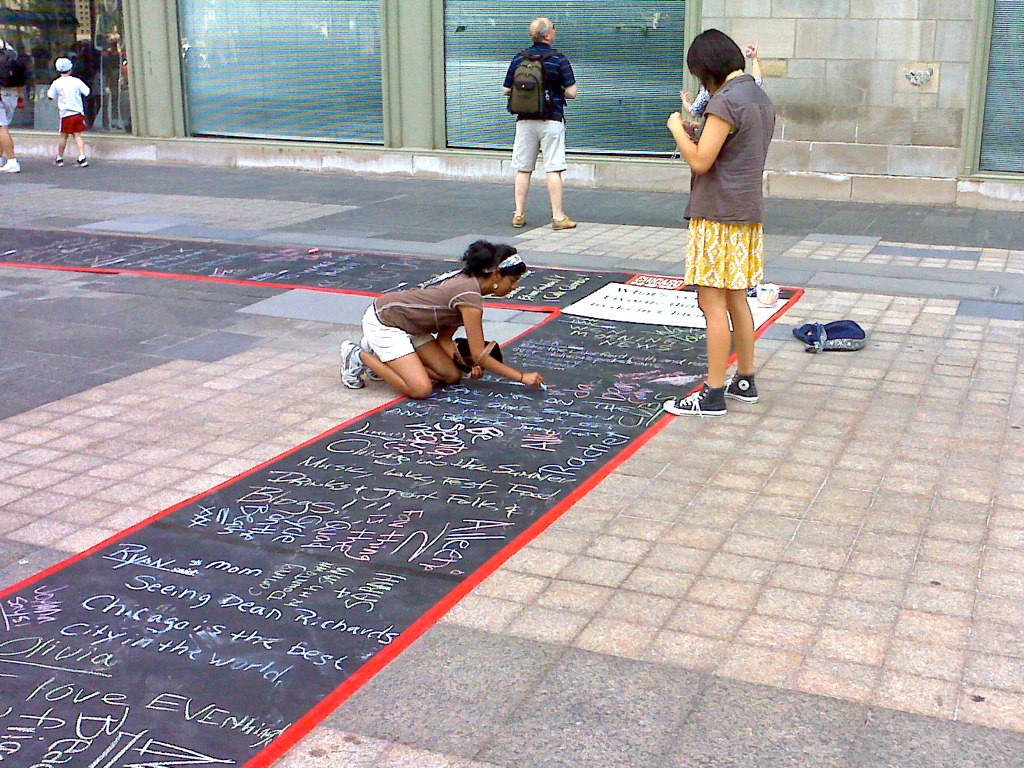
Community placemaking on the streets of Chicago.

Creative Placemaking is a branch of Placemaking that aims to "strategically shape the physical and social character of a neighbourhood, town, city, or region around arts and cultural activities". Such efforts may aim to highlight local cultural assets, improve the physical character of neighborhoods, and contribute to economic development by encouraging investment and supporting employment opportunities.

=== Tactical Placemaking ===
Tactical Placemaking operates through short-term, affordable and low risk interventions with a high potential impact. The approaches are usually phased and scalable, which makes them easier to implement in certain contexts.

== Criticism and Debate ==
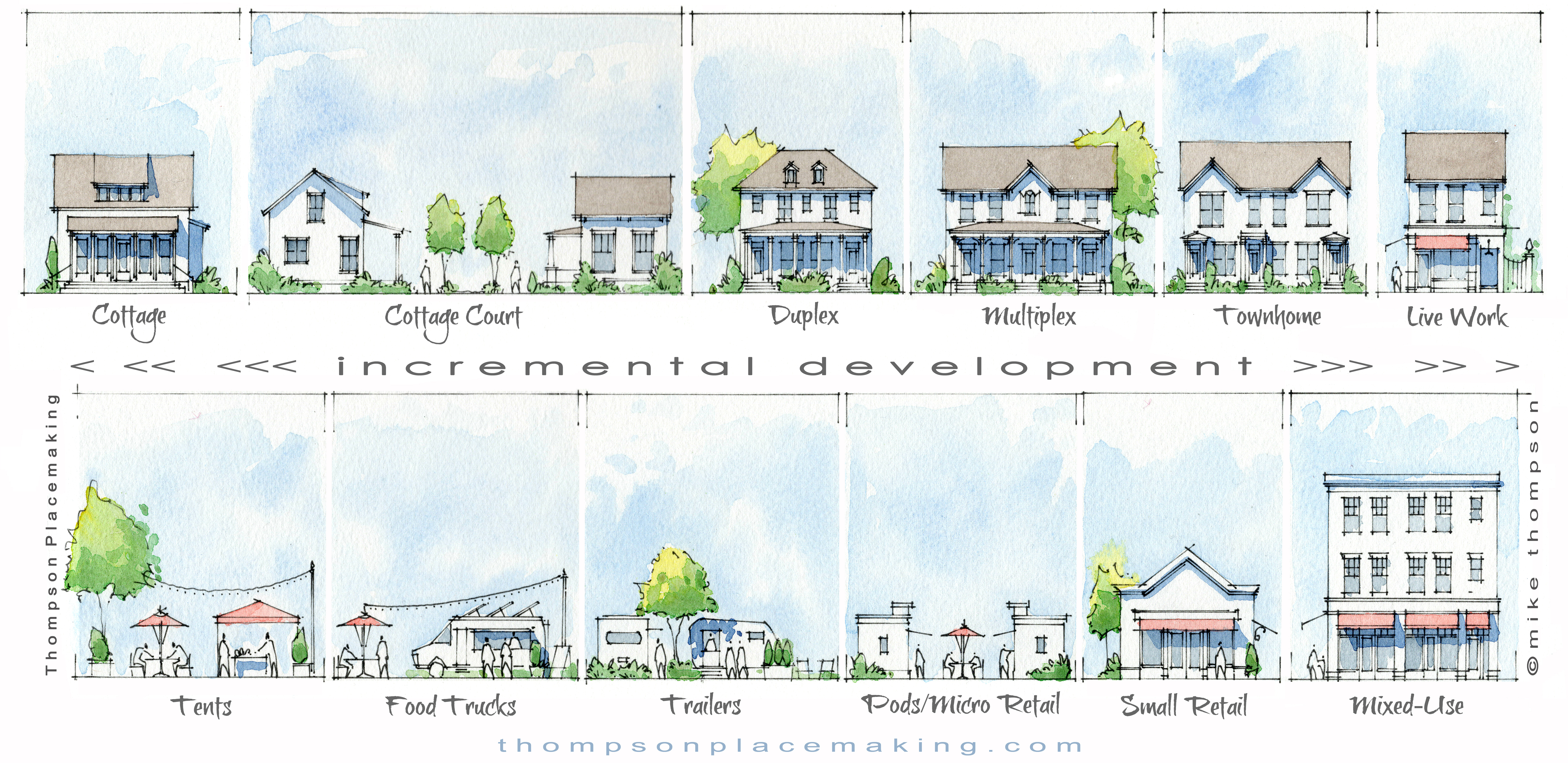
Different examples of placemaking that architects and planners use to enhance pedestrian experiences.

Despite its widespread adoption in planning and urban design, placemaking has been the subject of significant scholarly debate. Critics note that the concept is loosely defined, which allows it to be interpreted and applied in different ways. While its flexibility has contributed to its popularity, it has also led to concerns that placemaking can function as a vague umbrella concept encompassing a wide range of practices and agendas.

Other critiques focus on the role of placemaking in contemporary urban redevelopment, noting that in some cases, these initiatives may contribute to gentrification, displacement, or the commodification of public space when place-based improvements become closely tied to real estate development and city branding. Additional debates concern the political and cultural assumptions embedded in placemaking practices, which typically draw on ideas about public space developed in liberal democratic contexts, and might not translate easily to other societal structures.

== See also ==
- Project for Public Spaces
- Community of place
- Tactical urbanism
- Urban informatics
- Urban vitality
- Walkability
- Cyclability
