= List of privately owned public spaces in New York City =

Privately owned public spaces (POPS) in New York City were introduced in the 1961 Zoning Resolution. The city offers zoning concessions to commercial and residential developers in exchange for a variety of spaces accessible and usable for the public. There are over 590 POPS at over 380 buildings in New York City and are found principally in Manhattan. Spaces range from extended sidewalks to indoor atriums with seating and amenities. International attention was brought to POPS during the Occupy Wall Street movement begun in 2011 in Zuccotti Park.

POPS are required to contain a certain number of amenities and be open to the public. However, as of 2023, about 20 percent of POPs violated the terms of their agreements with the city, often because the POPS was closed, was occupied by a private business, or did not contain required amenities.

== List ==
List of noteworthy spaces.

=== Manhattan ===
==== Downtown ====
- 17 State Street
- 125 Broad Street, 2 New York Plaza
- 85 Broad Street, Oppenheimer Holdings
- 55 Water Street
- 77 Water Street
- 32 Old Slip, Financial Square
- 111 Wall Street
- 75 Wall Street, Barclays Bank
- 88 Pine Street, Wall Street Plaza
- 180 Maiden Lane, considered "the best fully indoor POPS in downtown Manhattan" by APOPS (Advocates for Privately Owned Public Space)
- 200 Water Street
- 59 Maiden Lane, Home Insurance Plaza
- 10 Liberty Street
- 60 Wall Street
- 40 Broad Street
- 17 Battery Place, Whitehall Building
- 33 Maiden Lane, Two Federal Reserve Plaza
- 55 Church Street, Millenium Hilton Hotel
- 105 Duane Street, Tribeca Tower
- 388 Greenwich Street
- LentSpace
- Zuccotti Park, One Liberty Plaza
- 181 Mercer Street

==== West Side ====
- 300 Mercer Street
- 99 Jane Street
- 650 West 42nd Street, River Place
- 825 Eighth Avenue, One Worldwide Plaza
- 322 West 57th Street, BMW
- 1000 Tenth Avenue, St. Luke's Roosevelt Hospital Center
- 200 West 60th Street, Concerto
- 45 West 60th Street, Regent
- 30 West 61st Street, Beaumont
- One Central Park West, Trump International Hotel and Tower
- 1886 Broadway, 30 Lincoln Plaza
- One Lincoln Plaza
- 75 West End Avenue
- 2 Lincoln Square
- 145 West 67th Street, Tower 67
- 1991 Broadway, Bel Canto

==== Central Midtown ====
- 108 Fifth Avenue
- 5 East 22nd Street, Madison Green
- 50 Lexington Avenue
- 230 West 27th Street
- 1 Pennsylvania Plaza, One Penn Plaza
- 3 Park Avenue
- 420 Fifth Avenue
- 445 Fifth Avenue, Fifth Avenue Tower
- 1411 Broadway, World Apparel Center
- 1095 Avenue of the Americas
- 120 Park Avenue, Philip Morris
- 101 Park Avenue
- 1114 Sixth Avenue, W. R. Grace Building
- 1155 Sixth Avenue
- 1535 Broadway, Marriott Marquis
- 1185 Sixth Avenue, Stevens Tower
- 1211 Avenue of the Americas
- 1166 Sixth Avenue
- 575 Fifth Avenue
- 299 Park Avenue, Westvaco
- 437 Madison Avenue
- 12 East 49th Street, Tower 49
- 611 Fifth Avenue
- 1251 Sixth Avenue
- 1221 Sixth Avenue, McGraw-Hill
- 745 Seventh Avenue
- 1633 Broadway, Paramount Plaza
- 1285 Sixth Avenue, Paine Webber
- 650 Fifth Avenue
- 645 Fifth Avenue, Olympic Tower
- 457 Madison Avenue, New York Palace Hotel
- 40 East 52nd Street
- 345 Park Avenue
- 55 East 52nd Street
- 520 Madison Avenue
- 31 West 52nd Street, Deutsche Bank
- 51 West 52nd Street, CBS
- 810 Seventh Avenue
- 1345 Avenue of the Americas
- 1370 Avenue of the Americas
- 712 Fifth Avenue
- 550 Madison Avenue
- 535 Madison Avenue, Warburg Dillon Read
- 65 East 55th Street, Park Avenue Tower
- 450 Park Avenue
- 590 Madison Avenue
- 725 Fifth Avenue, Trump Tower
- 118 West 57th Street, Le Parker Meridien Hotel
- 146 West 57th Street, Metropolitan Tower
- 888 Seventh Avenue
- 1755 Broadway, Symphony House
- 9 West 57th Street, Solow
- 767 Fifth Avenue, General Motors Building
- 115 East 57th Street, Galleria
- 135 East 57th Street
- 499 Park Avenue

In addition, the following POPS are on 6½ Avenue between 51st and 57th Street:

- Axa Equitable Center
- Carnegie Hall Tower
- Le Parker Meridien
- Metropolitan Tower

==== East Midtown ====
- 240 East 27th Street
- 155 East 31st Street, Windsor Court
- 200 East 32nd Street, Future
- 243 Lexington Avenue
- 401 East 34th Street, View 34
- 626 First Avenue, The Copper
- 630 First Avenue, Manhattan Place
- 560 Third Avenue, Murray Hill Mews
- 240 East 38th Street
- 311 East 38th Street, Whitney
- 330 East 38th Street, Corinthian
- 250 East 40th Street, Highpoint
- 222 East 39th Street, Eastgate Tower
- 600 Third Avenue
- 622 Third Avenue, Grand Central Plaza
- 235 East 40th Street, Vanderbilt
- 212 East 42nd Street, The Westin New York Grand Central Hotel
- 425 Lexington Avenue
- 140 East 45th Street, Two Grand Central Tower
- 685 Third Avenue
- 303 East 43rd Street, International Plaza
- 3 United Nations Plaza, UNICEF House
- 320 East 46th Street, Belmont
- 240 East 47th Street, Dag Hammarskjold Tower
- 747 Third Avenue
- 885 Second Avenue, 1 Dag Hammarskjold Plaza
- 845 First Avenue, Trump World Tower
- 100 United Nations Plaza/871 United Nations Plaza
- 767 Third Avenue
- 777 Third Avenue
- 780 Third Avenue
- 805 Third Avenue, Crystal Pavilion
- 255 East 49th Street, Sterling Plaza
- 153 East 53rd Street, Citigroup Center
- 875 Third Avenue
- Paley Park (3 East 53rd Street)
- 300 East 54th Street, Connaught Tower
- 420 East 54th Street, River Tower
- 415 East 54th Street, St. James Tower
- 245 East 54th Street, Brevard
- 360 East 57th Street, Morrison
- 300 East 59th Street, Landmark
- 425 East 58th Street, Sovereign
- 418 East 59th Street, Grand Sutton

==== Upper East Side ====
- 200 East 61st Street, Savoy
- 303 East 60th Street, Evansview
- 300 East 62nd Street, Paladin
- 167 East 61st Street, Trump Plaza
- 188 East 64th Street, Royale
- 200 East 64th Street, Carlton Towers
- 200 East 65th Street, Bristol
- 304 East 65th Street, Rio
- 200 East 69th Street, Trump Palace
- 211 East 70th Street
- 400 East 70th Street, Kingsley
- 524 East 72nd Street, Belaire
- 422 East 72nd Street, Oxford
- 525 East 72nd Street, One East River Place
- 300 East 75th Street, Fairmont
- 515 East 79th Street, Austen House
- 401 East 80th Street
- 200 East 82nd Street, Wimbledon
- 400 East 84th Street, Strathmore
- 300 East 85th Street, America
- 171 East 84th Street, Evans Tower
- 455 East 86th Street, Channel Club
- 201 East 87th Street
- 50 East 89th Street, Park Regis
- 200 East 89th Street, Monarch
- 40 East 94th Street, Carnegie Hill Tower
- 300 East 93rd Street, Waterford
- 340 East 93rd Street, Plymouth Tower
- 301 East 94th Street, Marmara Manhattan
- 235 East 95th Street, Normandie Court
- 175 East 96th Street, Monterey

=== Brooklyn ===
Downtown

- 350 Jay Street, Renaissance Plaza
- 130 Livingston Street, Livingston Plaza
- 1 MetroTech Center, Brooklyn Commons

=== Queens ===
Long Island City

- One Court Square

== See also ==
- List of New York City parks
