= Imperial House (New York City) =

Apartment building in Manhattan, New York

Coordinates: 40°46′5″N 73°57′47″W

Viewed from across Lexington Avenue (2026)

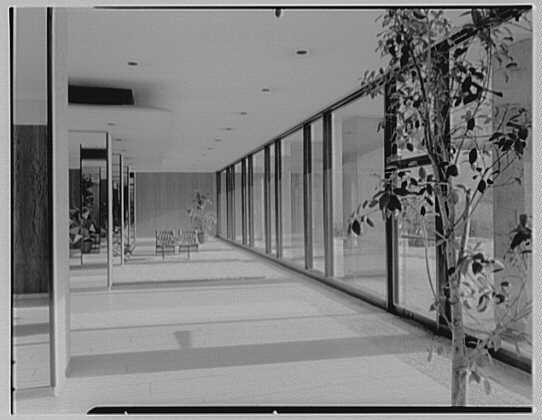
The lobby of the Imperial House in 1961.

Imperial House is a high-rise apartment building at 150 East 69th Street in Manhattan in New York City. It was New York's largest post-war apartment building at the time of its construction. The building was owned and built by the Fisher Brothers. The architect was Emery Roth & Sons. The project engineer was W.R. Cosentini & Associates, Raisler Corp were the mechanical contractors. The garden of Imperial House collapsed into its underground garage shortly after construction.

Construction started on Imperial House in 1959 and was completed in 1961. The building has 30 residential floors with 350 apartments and offices. Interiors were designed by the Raymond Lowey Group. The actor Joan Crawford lived at Imperial House from November 1968 to her death in 1977. Crawford lived at apartment 22G from 1968 to 1973 and at 22H from 1973 to 1977. Her 22H apartment was featured in Architectural Digest in 1975.

Imperial House is noted for its distinctive white brick design; a 2010 New York Times article on white brick buildings described it as a "star" of the 140 white brick apartment buildings of Manhattan.

Imperial House was sold for $51.6 million in 1971 (equivalent to $405,443,714 in 2025). It was converted into a housing cooperative in a process beginning in 1971 by N. Anthony Rolfe and other investors. There were 378 apartments in the building at the time. 213 apartments were sold by 1980, the process was almost complete by 2007, with 7 apartments remaining. The process led to "court battles and confrontations" according to the New York Times. In 1971 a one-bedroom apartment cost $43,000 (equivalent to $341,845 in 2025) with an "upper-floor three-bedroom with a gallery, living room, dining room, library, four bathrooms and a maid's room" going for $150,000 (equivalent to $1,192,482 in 2025).
