= 300 East 57th Street =

Residential skyscraper in Manhattan, New York

Coordinates: 40.758923°N 73.965116°W

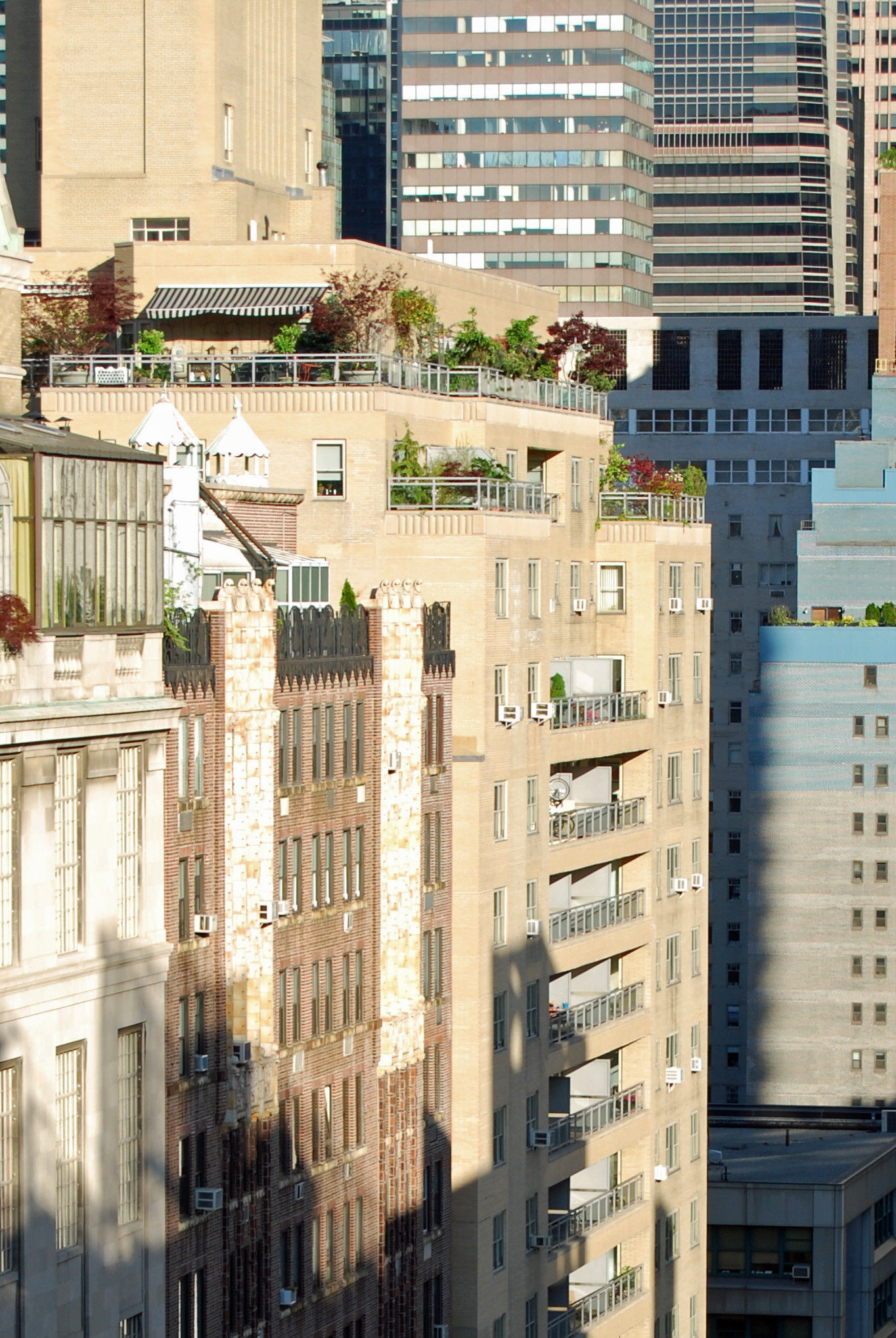
The upper floors of 300 East 57th Street

300 East 57th Street is an apartment building on the corner of East 57th Street and Second Avenue in the Midtown neighborhood of Manhattan, New York City. Designed by Emery Roth and completed in November 1947, it was one of the first new luxury buildings built in Manhattan during the housing boom following the end of World War II. In 1948, only a few months after the building opened, theater producer Max Jelin was killed in a gas explosion in his apartment.

The building is the last known New York address for J. D. Salinger before he moved to a life of seclusion in the New Hampshire woods. Other notable tenants have included Liza Minnelli, Howard St. John, Peter Allen, Rocky Graziano, and Kay Thompson.
