= 450 Park Avenue =

Office skyscraper in Manhattan, New York

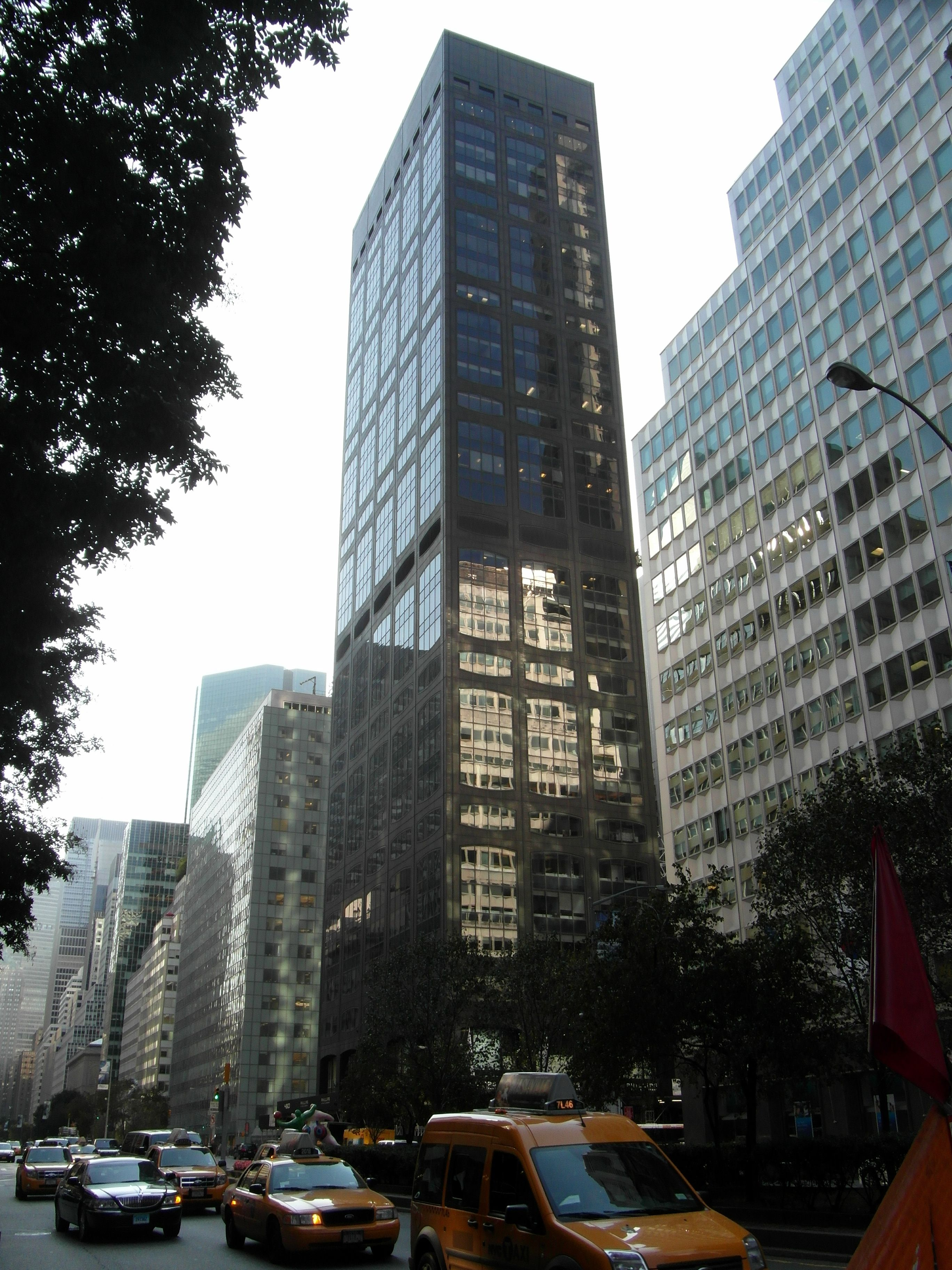
- 450 Park Avenue in 2012
- Interactive map of the 450 Park Avenue area
- Former names: Franklin National Bank Building

General information
- Status: Opened
- Type: Office
- Location: 450 Park Avenue, Midtown Manhattan, New York, 10022
- Coordinates: 40°45′41.27″N 73°58′16.65″W
- Completed: 1972
- Cost: $545 million
- Owner: Oxford Properties

Height
- Architectural: 390 ft (120 m)

Technical details
- Floor count: 33
- Floor area: 333,400 sq ft (30,970 m^{2})

Design and construction
- Architect: Emery Roth & Sons
- Developer: Peter Sharp

450 Park Avenue (also known as Franklin National Bank Building) is an office building on Park Avenue in Midtown Manhattan in New York City. The building has 33 floors and is 390 feet (120 m) tall.

450 Park Avenue has a steel skeleton with concrete floors. The exterior is dominated by black granite and glass. The building was designed by Emery Roth & Sons and developed by Peter Sharp. Adjacent to the building is a public plaza, a privately owned public space, with benches.

== History ==
In June 2002, 450 Park Avenue was purchased by Taconic Investment Partners. That company spent around $13 million on renovating the lobby, replacing the elevators, and redesigning public areas.

Five years later, in June 2007, Somerset Partners bought 450 Park Avenue for $509 million, or $1,566 per square foot ($16,860/m^{2}). This made it the highest price per square foot paid for an office building at the time in the United States. To pay for the building, Somerset Partners signed a $175 million loan. In mid-2008, Somerset Partners also moved its head office to the building.

On October 30, 2010, a brand of the Phillips de Pury auction house opened on the first three floors of 450 Park Avenue. The first auction was held on November 8 of that year. The auction house covers an area of almost 334,000 sq ft (31,030 m^{2}).

In February 2014, 450 Park Avenue was sold to Crown Acquisitions and Oxford Properties for $545 million.

== Location ==
450 Park Avenue is located in Midtown Manhattan on Park Avenue between East 56th Street and East 57th Street. There are four New York City Subway stations in the immediate vicinity of the tower: 57th Street (F and M trains), Fifth Avenue–59th Street (N, R, and W trains), Fifth Avenue/53rd Street (E, F, and <F> trains). and Lexington Avenue–59th Street (4, 5, 6, <6>, N, R, and W trains).

450 Park Avenue borders two buildings, including 432 Park Avenue to the southwest and a branch of Turbull & Asser to the west. On the other side of East 57th Street is the Davies Building and on the other side of Park Avenue is 445 Park Avenue. Other striking buildings in the immediate vicinity of 450 Park Avenue are Trump Tower, Four Seasons Hotel New York, Sony Tower, and the General Motors Building.
