= Julian Roth =

American architect

Julian Roth (September 2, 1902 – December 9, 1992) was an American architect. Following the death of his father, founder Emery Roth, he and his brother Richard took over at Emery Roth & Sons, one of the oldest and most prolific firms in New York City.

National Real Estate Investor dubbed the brothers "New York's name-brand architects, designing much of Sixth Avenue in the 1960s and 1970s." They were also a key contractor in building the World Trade Center.

Roth was also on the master list of Nixon political opponents.
