= 601 West End Avenue =

Apartment building in Manhattan, New York

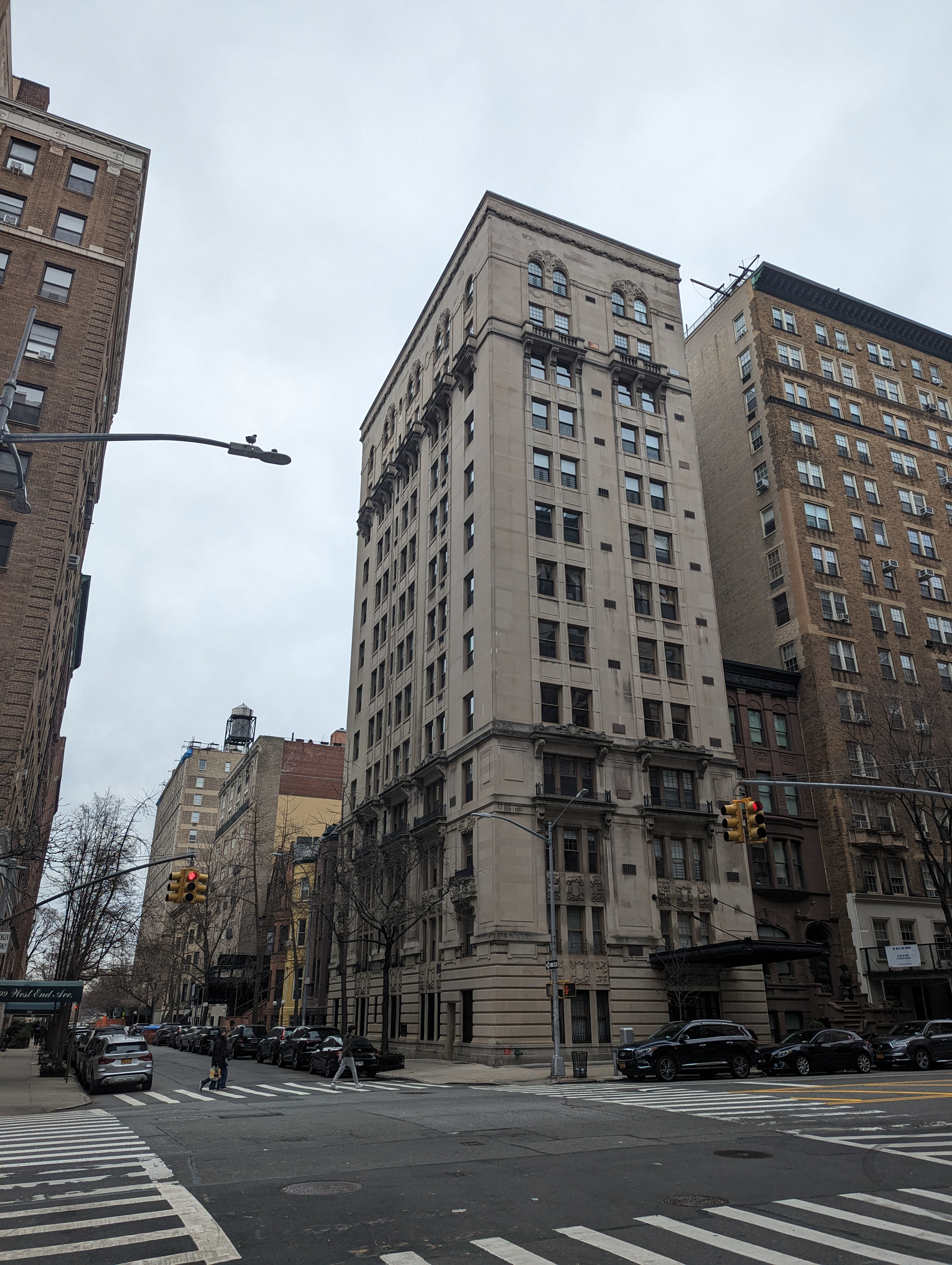

General information
- Type: Cooperative apartments
- Architectural style: Neoclassical
- Location: Upper West Side, Manhattan, New York City, U.S.
- Address: 601 West End Avenue, New York, NY 10024
- Coordinates: 40°47′28″N 73°58′36″W
- Completed: 1915
- Owner: 601 West End Avenue, Inc.

Technical details
- Material: Structural Steel and Concrete Slabs
- Floor count: 13

Design and construction
- Architect(s): Emery Roth
- Developer: Alfred Saxe

601 West End Avenue is a luxury apartment building on West End Avenue on the northwest corner of West 89th Street on the Upper West Side of Manhattan in New York City. The thirteen-story building was designed by noted architect Emery Roth and built in 1915. In a review by the architectural critic Carter B. Horsley, the building was praised as "one of the city's most elegant and distinguished apartment buildings."

== Architecture ==
In his book Mansions in the Sky, Steven Ruttenbaum observes that 601 West End Avenue "exhibits an eclectic mixture of neo-classicism and the Vienna Secession" and is "notable for its discipline and sobriety." The building, he wrote, originally had only one apartment per floor.

The architecture critic Carter B. Horsley wrote "The building's façade is nicely modeled to accent its verticality, but is punctuated by a very large wrought-iron entrance marquee and large balconies on the fourth, fifth and twelfth floors. The 13th floor has arched windows below the building's simple cornice."

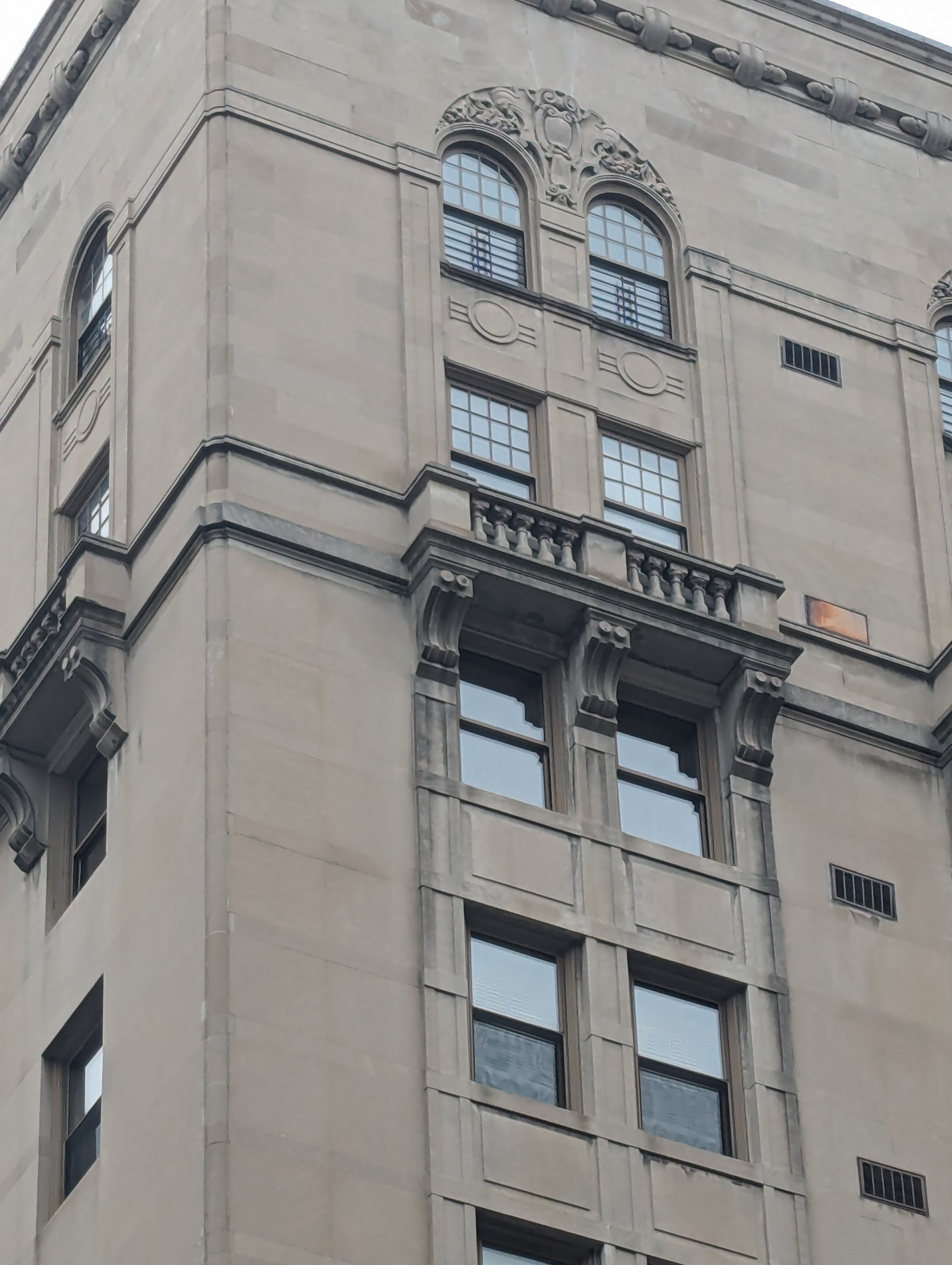
601 West End Avenue Balconies

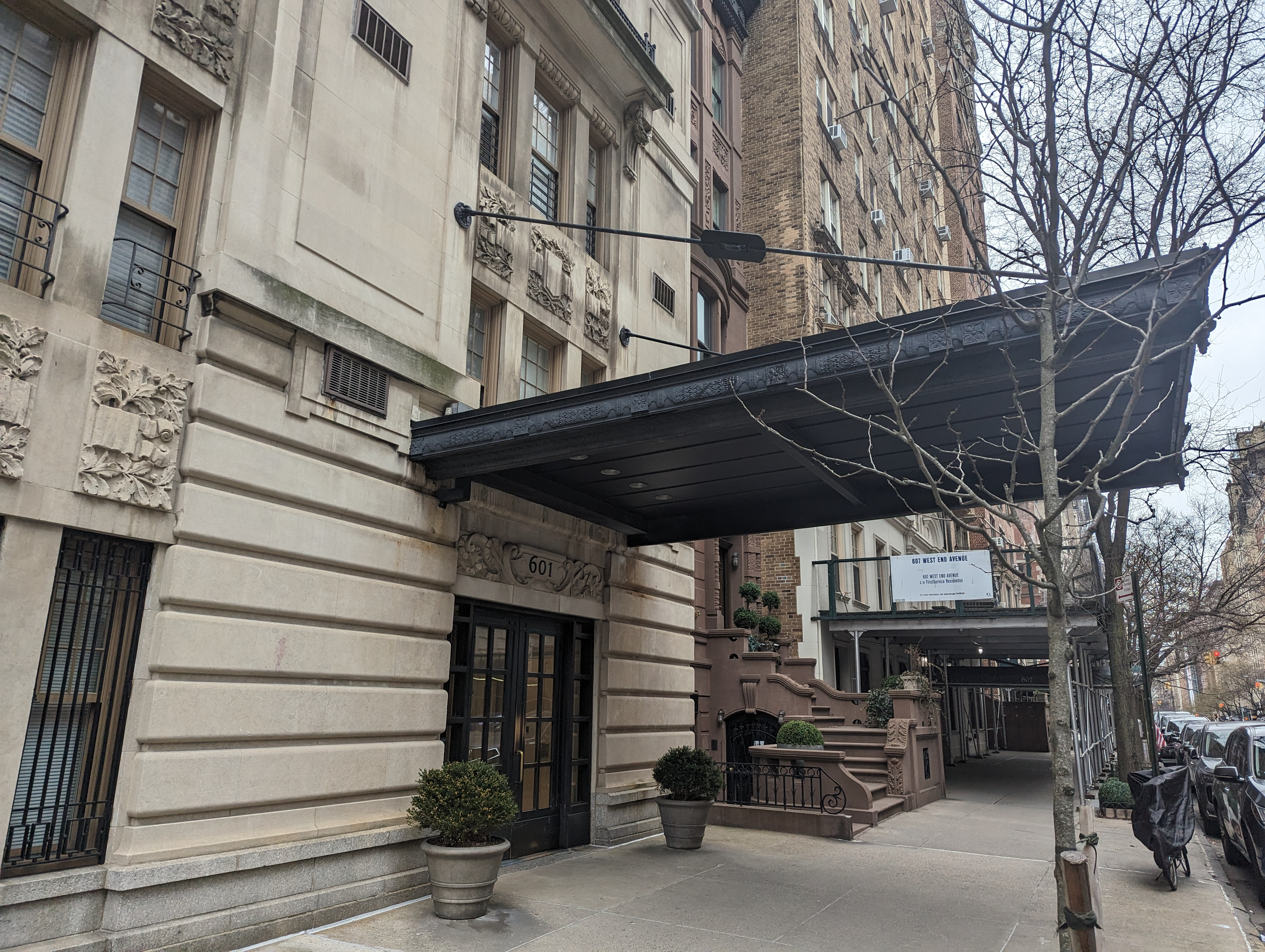
601 West End Avenue marquee

== History ==
=== Development, 1915 to 1940s ===
In 1915, the developer Alfred Saxe purchased the two row houses on the corner of 89th street. Emery Roth's plans filed in May that year, placed construction costs at $260,000.

Originally the building residents were affluent and would have maintained a domestic staff in their large 3,000-square-foot (280 m^{2}) apartments. In a 1930 article detailing a burglary, The New York Times details the staff: "In 1930 Joseph Baumann, who ran a furniture business, and his wife occupied the sixth floor apartment. Living with them were four servants, a butler, maid, nurse (who had charge of an infant), and a cook. On June 12 that year, Mrs. Baumann entered a hospital for a minor operation. When she returned home four days later, she discovered $100,000 in jewels missing from her bedroom."

Sometime during or after the Great Depression the building was converted into a Single Room Occupancy hotel with 117 rooms.

=== Nursing home, 1944 to 1975 ===
In 1943 the building was bought and converted into a nursing home. In 1957, it was remodeled as the Mayflower Nursing Home. The home was operated by Bernard Bergman. However, the nursing home faced closure in 1975 due to reported deficiencies in care and safety violations.

=== Cooperative conversion, 1977 to present ===
In 1977, 601 West End Avenue was sold out of foreclosure for $500,000, with a subsequent $1 million construction bond to facilitate its conversion into a cooperative. The Recycling for Housing Partnership of Austin Laber and Jerome Kretchmer was the group behind the conversion. The remodel setup the building with two apartments per floor with a penthouse on the roof.

The building continues to be run as a cooperative. Apartments now sell for over $2 million.
