= Fred Kent =

Fred Kent is the founder and president of the nonprofit organization Project for Public Spaces. The organization is dedicated to creating public places that foster communities.

He studied with Margaret Mead and worked with William H. Whyte on the "Street Life Project," assisting in observations and film analysis of corporate plazas, urban streets, parks, and other open spaces in New York City.

In 1968, Kent founded the Academy for Black and Latin Education (ABLE), a street academy for high school dropouts. He was Program Director for the Mayor's Council on the Environment in New York City under Mayor John Lindsay. In 1970, and again in 1990, Kent was the coordinator and chairman of New York City's Earth Day.

Kent is also an avid photographer, shooting thousands of photographs of public spaces and their users.

== Education ==
He attended Columbia University, where he studied geography, economics, transportation, planning, and anthropology.
