= Is Anybody Listening? (book) =

1952 book by William H. Whyte

Is Anybody Listening?: How and why United States Business Fumbles when it Talks with Human Beings
- Title page for Is Anybody Listening? (1952)
- Author: William H. Whyte
- Genre: Business
- Publisher: Simon & Schuster
- Publication date: 1952

Is Anybody Listening?: How and why United States Business Fumbles when it Talks with Human Beings is a book by urbanist William H. Whyte. This book on business and public relations was first published in 1952 by Simon & Schuster.
