= Project for Public Spaces =

Advocacy group for shared public places

- Formation: 1975
- Headquarters: Brooklyn, New York
- Website: https://www.pps.org/

Project for Public Spaces (PPS) is a nonprofit organization based in New York dedicated to creating and sustaining public places that build communities, in an effort often termed placemaking.

Planning and design rooted in the community form the cornerstone of PPS's work. Building on the techniques of William H. Whyte's "Street Life Project" and the book and film The Social Life of Small Urban Spaces, this approach involves looking at, listening to, and asking questions of the people in a community to discover their needs and aspirations. It was founded in 1975 by Fred Kent.

Some projects include the redesign of congested intersections in New York to be used for public use (including Times Square and Astor Place). This project was set into motion by Ethan Kent, a 22-year employee with PPS.

== See also ==
- The Social Life of Small Urban Spaces
