= The Westin New York Grand Central Hotel =

Hotel in Manhattan, New York

The Westin New York Grand Central
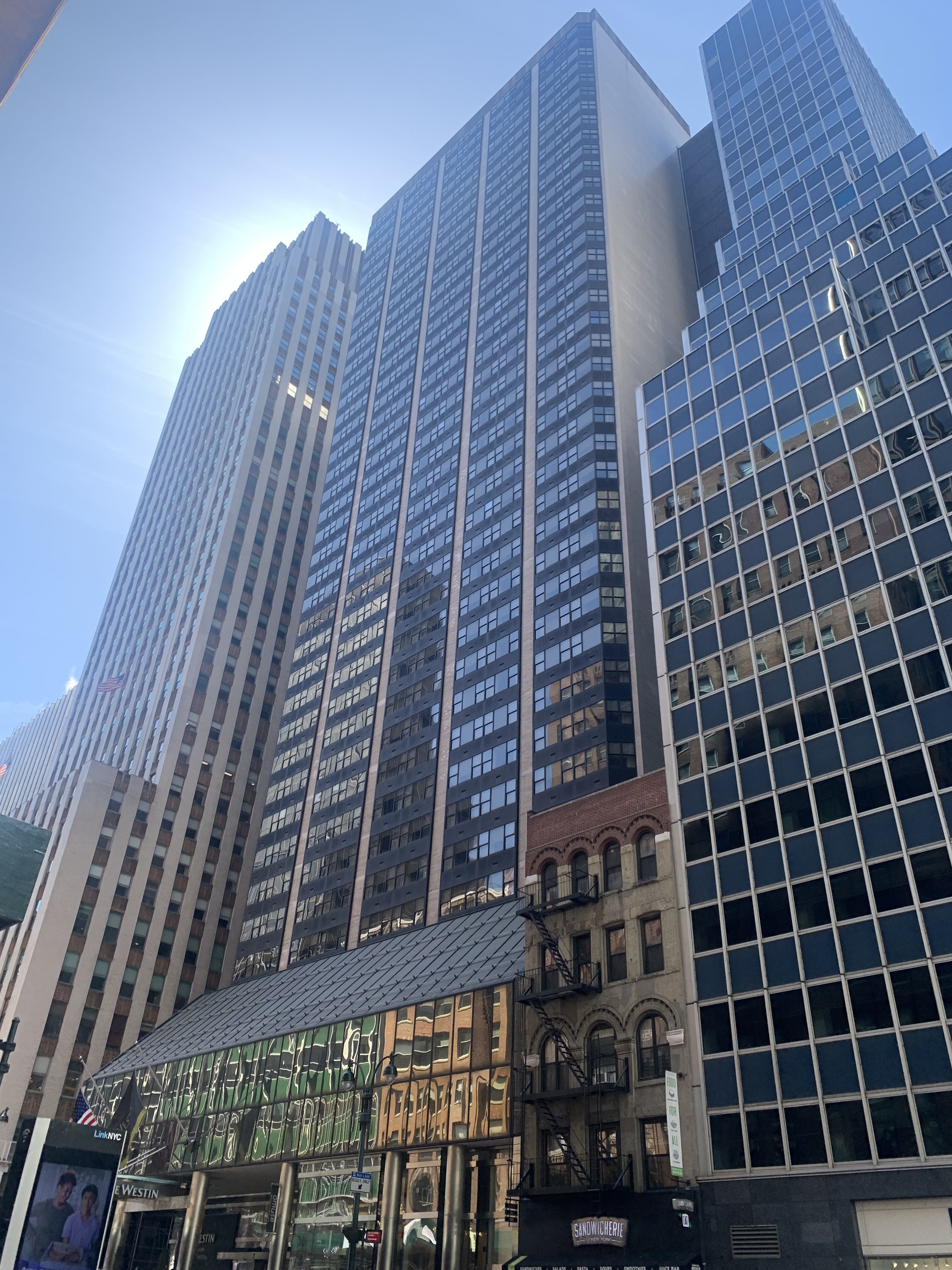
- Shot of the hotel from across East 42nd Street. The Daily News Building can be seen to the left.
- Hotel chain: Westin Hotels

General information
- Location: 212 East 42nd Street; New York City, New York 10017; United States
- Coordinates: 40°45′00″N 73°58′26″W
- Opening: February 18, 1981
- Owner: Davidson Kempner Capital Management
- Operator: HEI Hotels & Resorts

Design and construction
- Architect: Emery Roth & Sons
- Developer: Harry Helmsley

Website
- www.marriott.com/en-us/hotels/nyczw-the-westin-new-york-grand-central/overview/

The Westin New York Grand Central is a 40-story, 800-room business-oriented hotel approximately two blocks west of the United Nations headquarters and a little more than one block east of Grand Central Terminal in New York City, New York.

== History ==
The hotel was designed by Emery Roth & Sons and opened on February 18, 1981, as The Harley of New York - A Helmsley Hotel. Constructed by New York developer Harry Helmsley, the hotel's name was a combination of his own first name and that of his famous wife, Leona Helmsley. They co-owned the hotel with the Metropolitan Life Insurance Company. The Helmsleys attended the opening, along with Mayor Ed Koch, but the inaugural luncheon that day was marred by an accidental fire, which necessitated the evacuation of the entire hotel and required 23 people to be treated for smoke inhalation.

The Helmsleys purchased Hospitality Inns from Standard Oil of Ohio in 1981, renaming them to create a nationwide Harley Hotels chain of 27 properties, with the New York hotel as the flagship. Following a renovation, the hotel was renamed The New York Helmsley in November 1985.

Soon after Harry's death, Leona sold the remaining hotels in the Harley chain to a Philadelphia investment group in 1998 for $40 million. After Leona's death in 2007, her estate sold The New York Helmsley Hotel to Host Hotels & Resorts in 2011 for $313.5 million. The new owners contracted with Westin Hotels to manage the property, following an 18-month closure for a $75 million renovation, and the hotel became The Westin New York Grand Central on October 1, 2012. It was sold again on January 11, 2019, to Davidson Kempner Capital Management for $302 million. They renovated it at a cost of $35 million in 2021. In 2025, Smith Hill Capital completed a $216 refinancing of the property.
