= The Organization Man =

1956 book by William H. Whyte

- Cover of the first edition
- Author: William H. Whyte
- Language: English
- Subject: Business, management
- Publisher: Simon & Schuster
- Publication date: 1956
- Publication place: United States
- Media type: Print
- Pages: 429
- ISBN: 978-0-671-54330-3

The Organization Man is a book by William H. Whyte, originally published by Simon & Schuster in 1956.

== Whyte's approach ==
While employed by Fortune Magazine, Whyte did extensive interviews with the CEOs of major American corporations such as General Electric and Ford. A central tenet of the book is that average Americans subscribed to a collectivist ethic rather than to the prevailing notion of rugged individualism. A key point made was that people became convinced that organizations and groups could make better decisions than individuals, and thus serving an organization became logically preferable to advancing one's individual creativity. Whyte felt this was counterfactual and listed a number of examples of how individual work and creativity can produce better outcomes than collectivist processes. He observed that this system led to risk-averse executives who faced no consequences and could expect jobs for life as long as they made no egregious missteps. He also thought that everyone should have more freedom.

== Influence ==
According to Paul Leinberger and Bruce Tucker, the book is, "the most compelling portrait of middle-class Americans at midcentury and the starting point for all subsequent investigations of their legacy."

Deborah Popper and Frank Popper contend the book energized dissidents:

[The book] offered a new perspective on how post–World War II American society had redefined itself. Whyte’s 1950s America had replaced the Protestant ethic of individualism and entrepreneurialism with a social ethic that stressed cooperation and management: the individual subsumed within the organization. It was the age of middle management, what Whyte thought of as the rank and file of leadership, whether corporate, governmental, church, or university. [For those] of us who grew up in the 1950s....It formed our ideas about conformity, resistance to it, and the meaning of being part of an organization. The book and its title gave many of us reason to disparage the security the organization promised; that was for others but not for us.

The impact of Whyte's book complemented the fiction best seller of the period, The Man In The Gray Flannel Suit (1955) by Sloan Wilson, in inspiring criticism that those Americans motivated to win World War II returned to ostensibly less-meaningful lives. Whyte's book led to deeper examinations of the concept of "commitment" and "loyalty" within corporations. According to Nathan Glazer, the book was hailed as a benchmark for American corporate culture. It gave concrete evidence to a watchword of the decade: “conformity.” Whyte identified what he claimed was a "major shift in American ideology" away from an individualistic Protestant Ethic.

In actual corporate practice, according to Robert C. Leonard and Reta D. Artz, personnel managers in the San Francisco Bay area generally preferred the organizational man over the individualist. However, individualists were preferred in smaller companies and those with college-educated personnel managers.
