= Emery Roth =

American architect (1871–1948)

- Born: 1870/1871; Gálszécs, Kingdom of Hungary, (now Sečovce, Slovakia)
- Died: August 20, 1948 (aged 77); New York City, U.S.
- Citizenship: Austria-Hungary (1871–1918); United States (1884–1948)
- Occupation: Architect
- Notable work: Hotel Belleclaire (1903); Ritz Tower (1925); The El Dorado (1929–31); The San Remo (1930); The Ardsley (1931); 2 Sutton Place South (1938); 300 East 57th Street (1947)
- Spouse: Ella Grosman
- Children: 4 including Julian

Emery Roth (Hungarian: Róth Imre, died August 20, 1948) was a Hungarian-American architect of Hungarian-Jewish descent who designed many New York City hotels and apartment buildings of the 1920s and 1930s, incorporating Beaux-Arts and Art Deco details. His sons continued in the family enterprise, largely expanding the firm under the name Emery Roth & Sons.

== Life and career ==
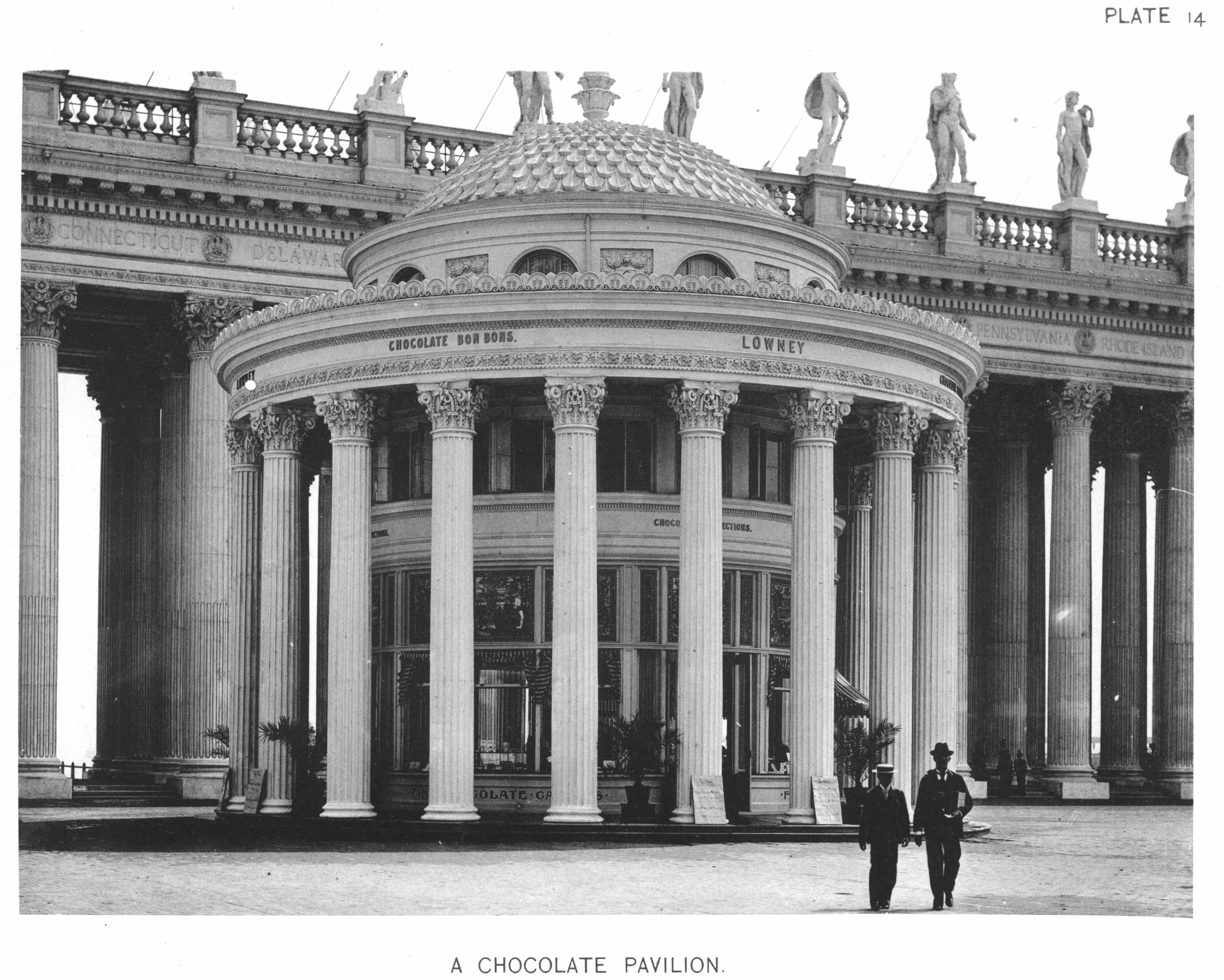
This World Columbian Exposition pavilion, designed by the young Roth alone, housed a temporary shop for the Menier Chocolate Company. Its design is a direct quotation of the ancient Roman Temple of Vesta, a visual trope that would later cap some of his most famous skyscrapers.

Born in Gálszécs, Kingdom of Hungary (now Sečovce, Slovakia) to a Jewish family, Roth emigrated to the United States at the age of 13 after his family fell into poverty upon his father's death. He began his architectural apprenticeship as a draftsman in the Chicago offices of Burnham & Root, working on the World's Columbian Exposition of 1893. Roth also designed one of his first solo projects at the Exposition: a pavilion that housed a chocolatier.

At the Exposition, Roth met Richard Morris Hunt, who was impressed with his skills and invited Roth to work in his office in New York. Following Hunt's premature death in 1895, Roth moved to the office of Ogden Codman Jr., a designer and decorator with a Newport, Rhode Island, clientele. In the interwar years, the firm of Emery Roth delivered some of the most influential examples of architecture for apartment houses in the at-the-time fashionable Beaux Arts style, especially in Manhattan.

Many of his most notable projects are located on the Upper West Side, specifically Central Park West which is home to the San Remo, the Beresford, the Ardsley, and others. In 1938, Roth included his sons Julian and Richard as partners.

== Buildings designed ==
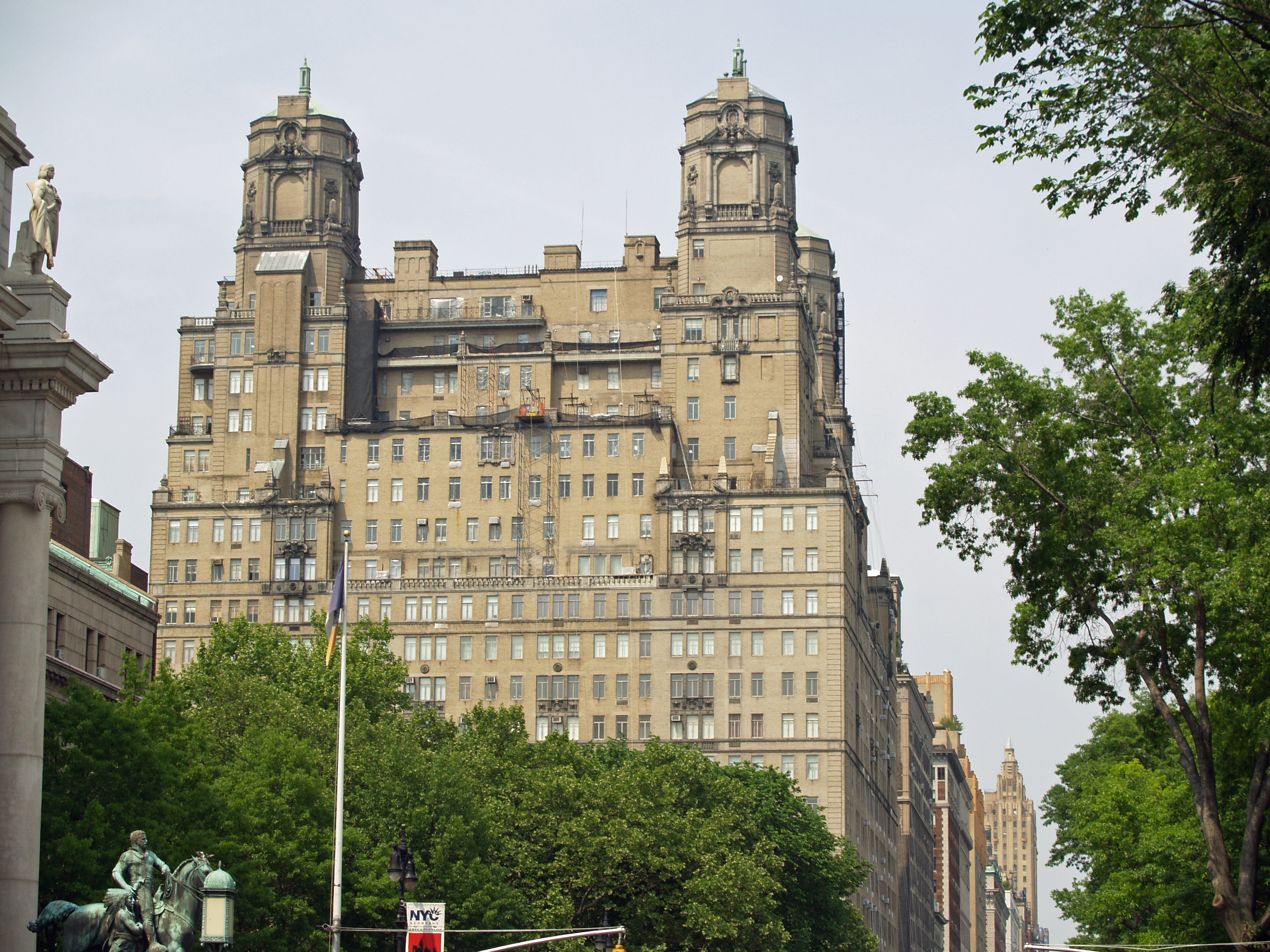
The Beresford

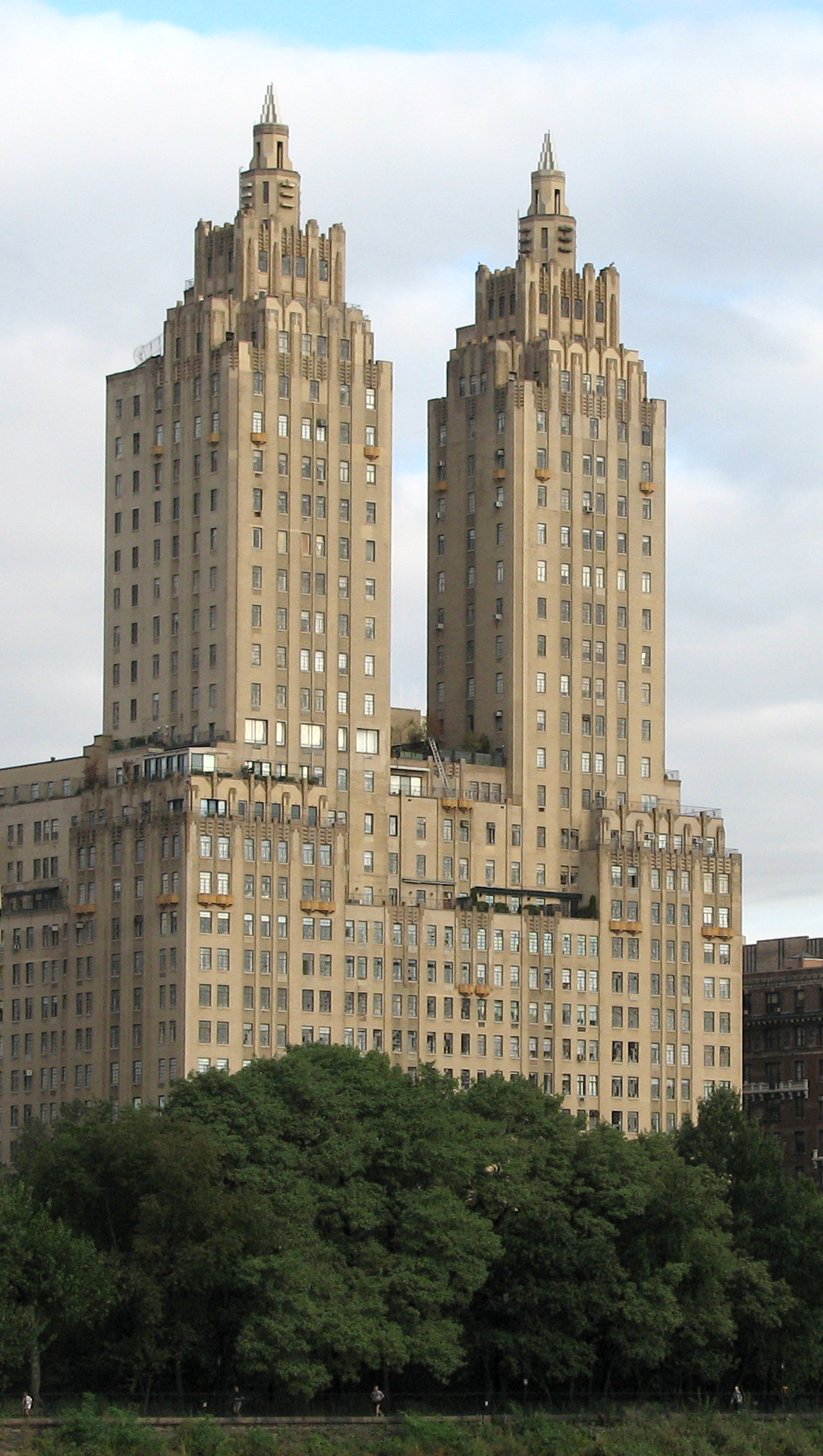
The El Dorado

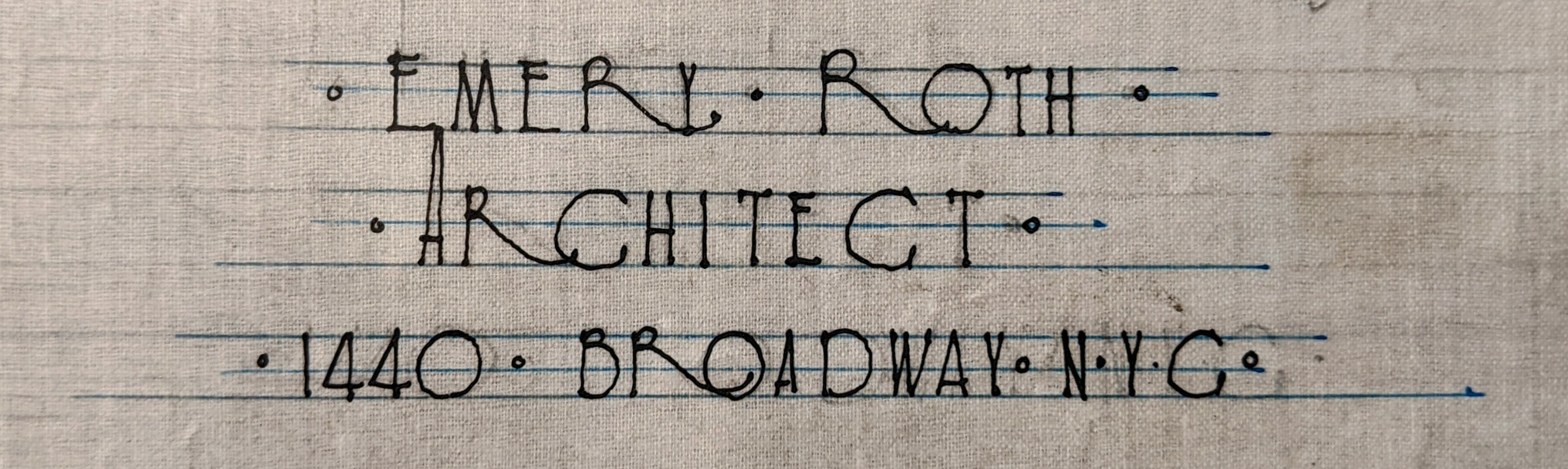
The mark of Emery Roth's architecture firm

Building	Year	Location	Notes
The Saxony	1899-1900	250 West 82nd Street	
Hotel Belleclaire	1903	250 West 77th Street (aka 1271–1277 Broadway)	
The Adath Jeshurun of Jassy synagogue	1903	58 Rivington Street	
Whitestone	1909	45 Tiemann Place	Builder Charter Construction Co.
601 West End Avenue	1915	601 West End Avenue	
The First Hungarian Reformed Church	1915	346 East 69th Street	
1000 Park Avenue	1916	Park Avenue and East 84th Street	
570 Park Avenue	1916	Park Avenue and East 63rd Street	
151 East 80th Street	1922	151 East 80th Street	
The Whitby	1924	325 West 45th Street	
The Gilford	1924	140 East 46th Street	
110 West 86th Street	1924	110 West 86th Street	
Chester Court	1924	201 West 89th Street	
243 West End Avenue	1925	243 West End Avenue (Manhattan)	
Mayflower Hotel	1925	15 Central Park West	demolished in 2004
221 West 82nd Street	1925	221 West 82nd Street	
930 Fifth Avenue	1940	930 Fifth Avenue	
Ritz Tower	1925	465 Park Avenue (101 East 57th)	With Thomas Hastings. New York's first residential skyscraper introduced terraces at the setback levels.
41 West 96th Street	1926	41 West 96th Street	
65 Central Park West	1926	65 Central Park West; Lincoln Square	
The Alden	1927	225 Central Park West; Upper West Side	
The Oliver Cromwell	1927	12 West 72nd Street	
Warwick Hotel	1927	65 West 54th Street	
Hotel Benjamin	1927	125 East 50th Street	
Hotel Carteret	1927	208 West 23rd Street	
580 West End Avenue	1928	580 West End Avenue	
Manchester House	1928	145 West 79th Street	
The Belvoir	1928	470 West End Avenue	
The El Dorado	1929–1931	300 Central Park West / Central Park West Historic District	
The Beresford	1929	211 Central Park West	
15 West 81st Street	1929	15 West 81st Street	
300 West 23rd Street	1929	300 West 23rd Street	
435 East 57th Street	1927	435 East 57th Street	
35 Prospect Park West	1929	Prospect Park; Brooklyn	
Hotel St. George	1930	100 Henry Street, Brooklyn Heights	
Hotel St. Moritz	1930	50 Central Park South	
993 Fifth Avenue	1930	993 Fifth Avenue	
784 Park Avenue	1930	784 Park Avenue	
The San Remo	1930	145 and 146 Central Park West	The first of the twin-towered residential skyscrapers.
The Ardsley	1931	320 Central Park West	Roth's outstanding Art Deco residential skyscraper.
275 Central Park West	1930–1931	275 Central Park West	
299 West 12th Street	1931	299 West 12th Street	
140 East 28th Street	1932	140 East 28th Street	
888 Grand Concourse	1937	888 Grand Concourse	
880 Fifth Avenue	1948	880 Fifth Avenue	
2 Sutton Place South	1938	2 Sutton Place South	
41 West 96th Street	1925	41 West 96th Street	
310 West End Avenue	1927	310 West End Avenue	
The Normandy	1938	140 Riverside Drive	Last of the twin-towered residences, and Roth's choice for his retirement apartment.
Shenandoah Apartments	1929	10 Sheridan Square	
The Grasmoor House	1940	2370-2380 Madison Road, Cincinnati Ohio	An amazing 55 unit Art Deco residential condominium.

== Emery Roth & Sons ==
Despite the fact that Roth's sons, Julian and Richard, had joined the firm many years earlier, it was not until 1947 that the firm's name was changed to Emery Roth & Sons, approximately one year before Roth's death. Julian (1901–1992) specialized in construction costs and building materials and technology, while Richard (1904–1987) was named the firm's principal architect.

In the 1950s and 1960s Emery Roth & Sons became the most influential architectural firm in New York and contributed substantially in changing the appearance of Midtown and Lower Manhattan. In that particular period of time Emery Roth & Sons designed dozens of speculative office buildings, mostly with curtain wall facades, which soon became a ubiquitous feature of the city.

Beginning in the mid-1960s, the firm was also hired as associate architects in large-scale projects like the Pan Am Building (1963), the World Trade Center (1966–1973) and the Citicorp Center (1977). In the early 1960s, Richard Roth's son, Richard Roth, Jr. (b. 1933) became the third generation to join the firm, eventually rising to chief architect CEO and shareholder.

As the firm expanded and diversified over six decades, it remained a family business through the 1990s. In 1988 Richard Roth Jr's daughter Robyn Roth-Moise joined the firm as comptroller. Richard Roth Jr's son Richard Lee Roth joined the firm in 1982 and became the chief specification writer for Emery Roth & Sons. Both retired from the firm when Richard Roth Jr retired and was replaced as the company's CEO in 1993 by Robert Sobel, Roth's cousin.

Only three years later, in 1996, the firm ceased to operate, apparently because of financial distress. Emery's great-grandson Richard Lee Roth currently works in the architectural profession and resides in South Florida.

The extensive architectural records and papers of both Emery Roth and Emery Roth & Sons are now held in the Department of Drawings & Archives at the Avery Architectural and Fine Arts Library at Columbia University.

=== Work by Emery Roth & Sons ===
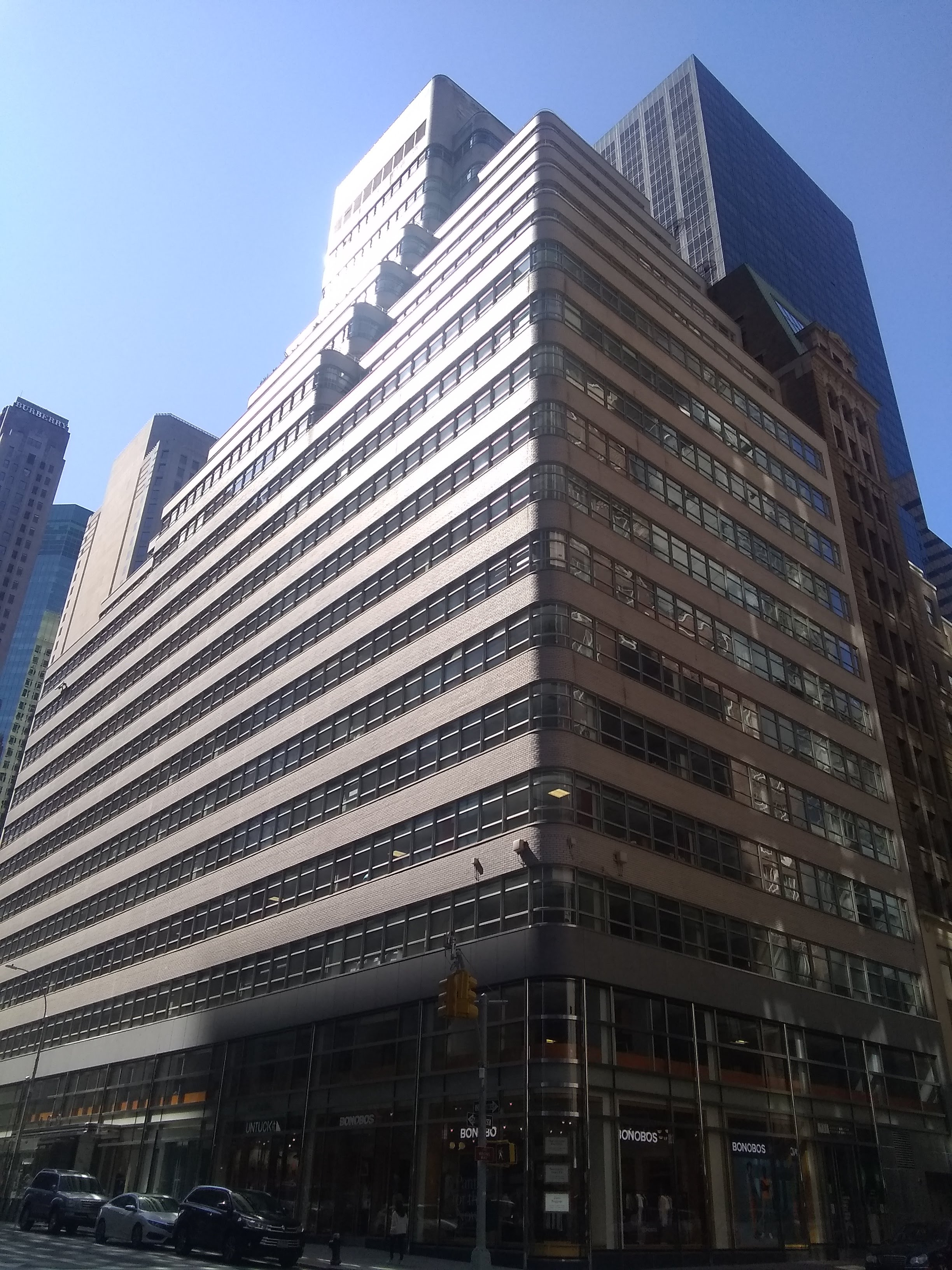
The Look Building (1949)

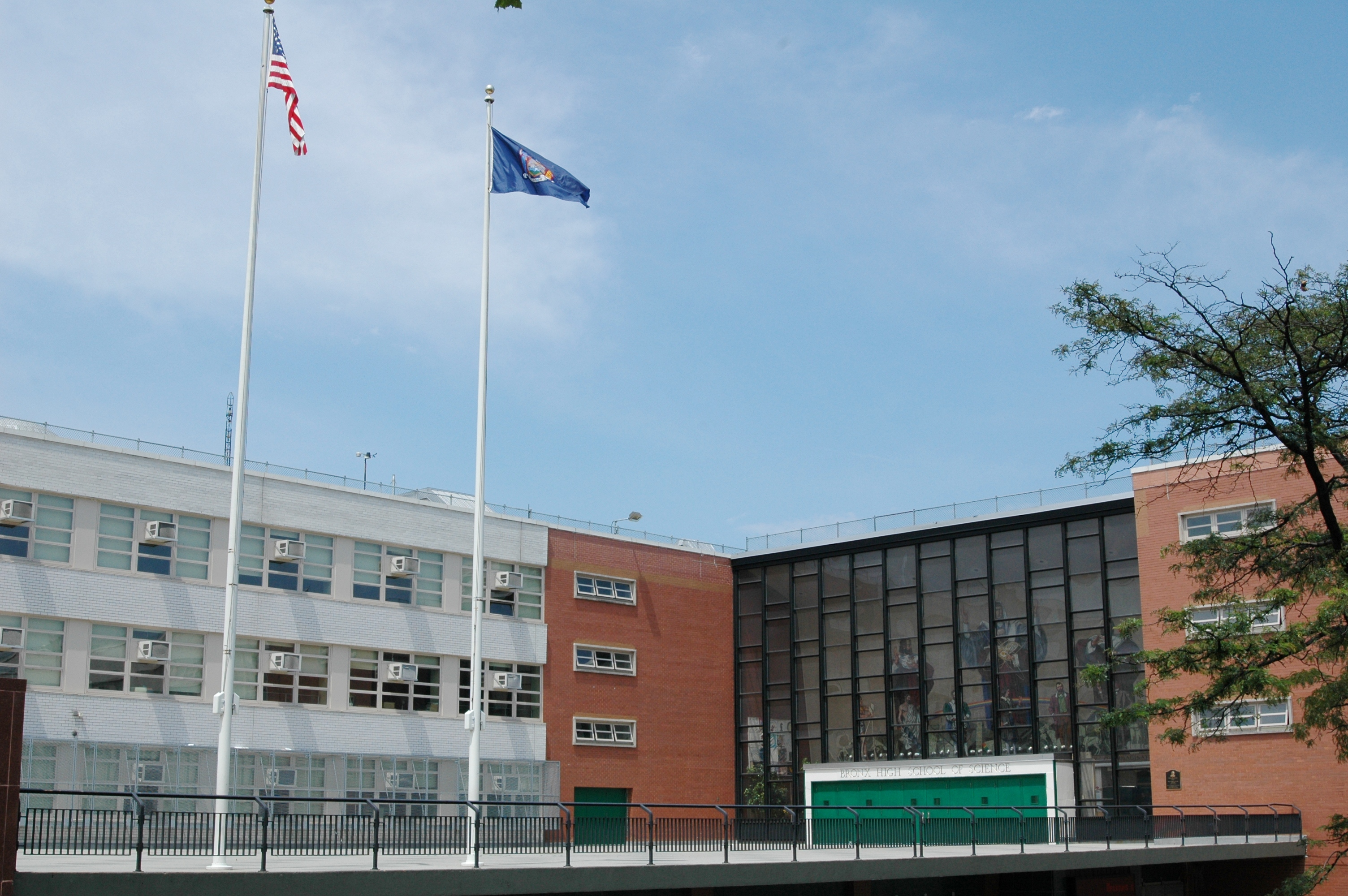
The Bronx High School of Science (1959)

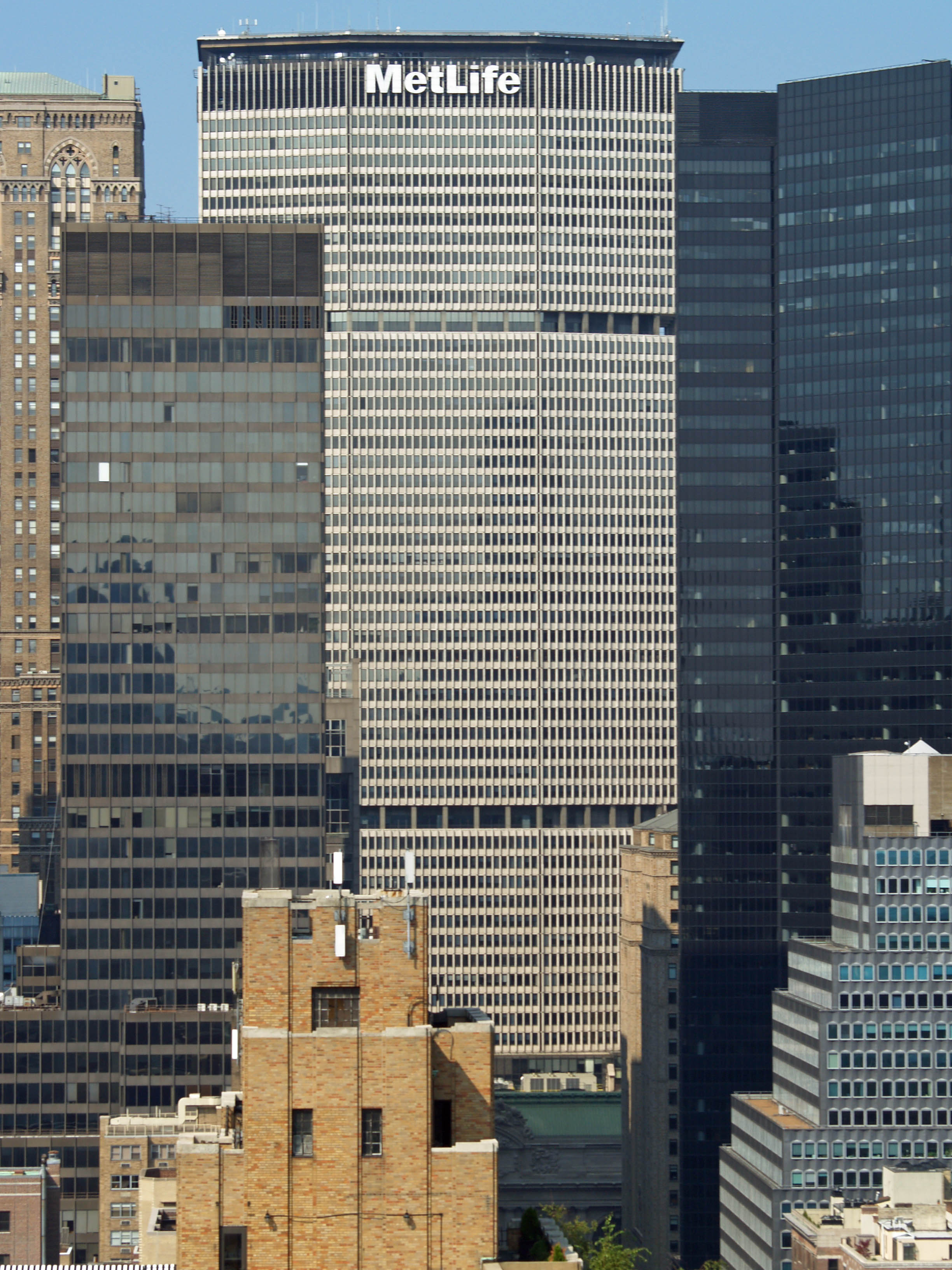
The MetLife Building (1963)

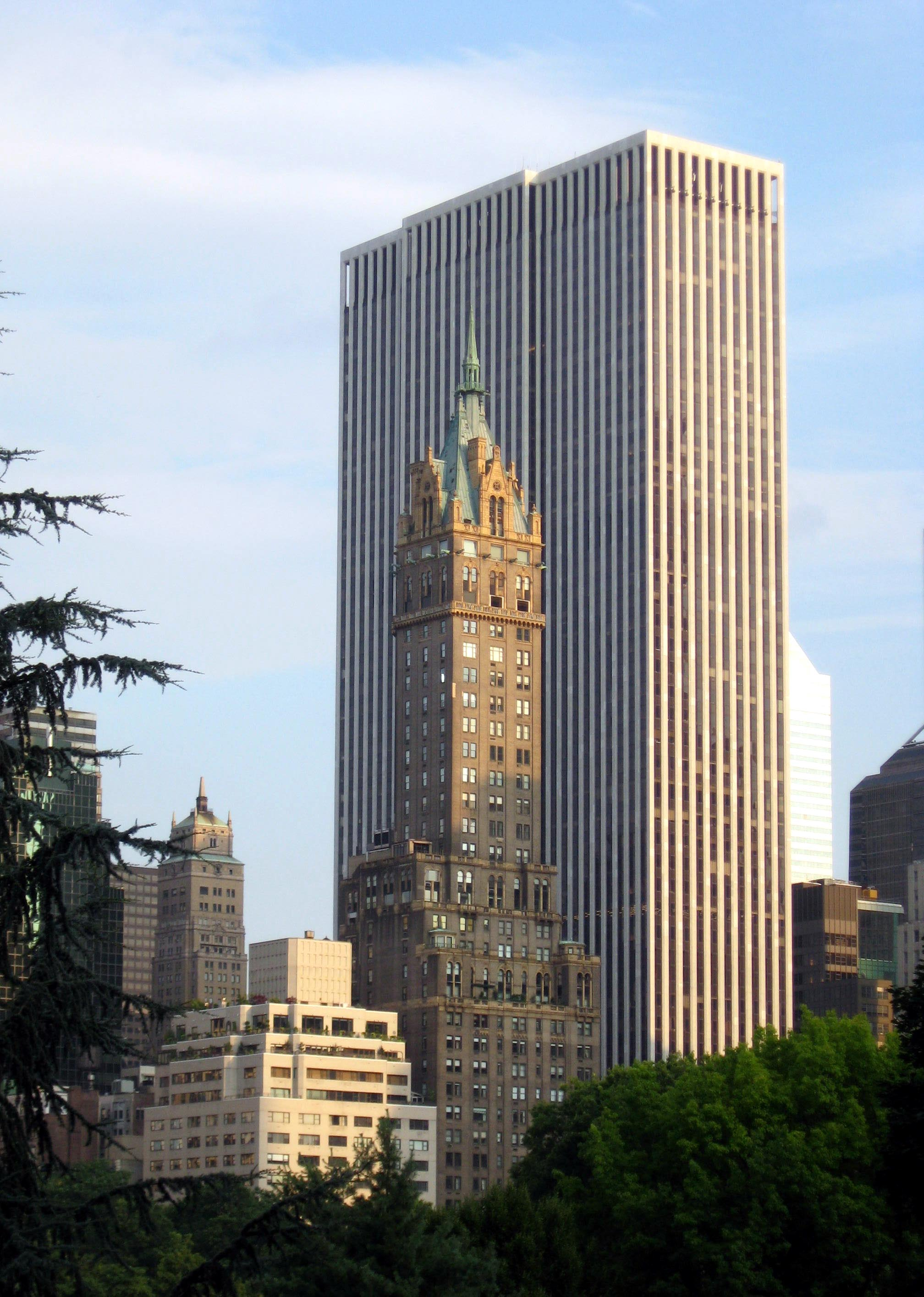
The General Motors Building (1968)

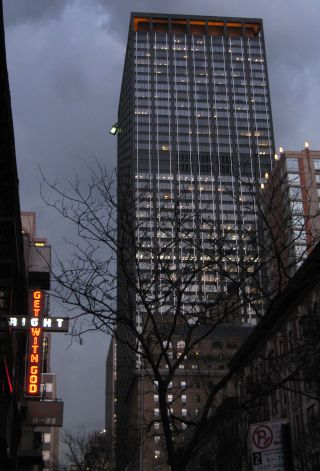
Paramount Plaza (1970)

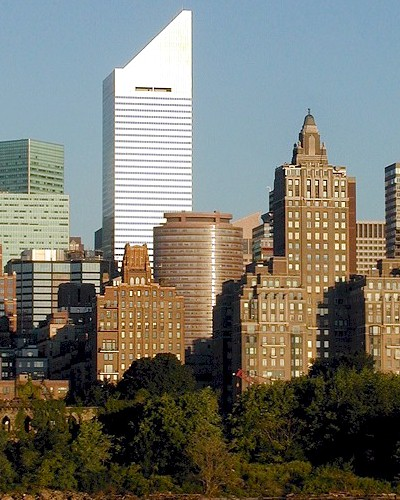
Citigroup Center (1977)

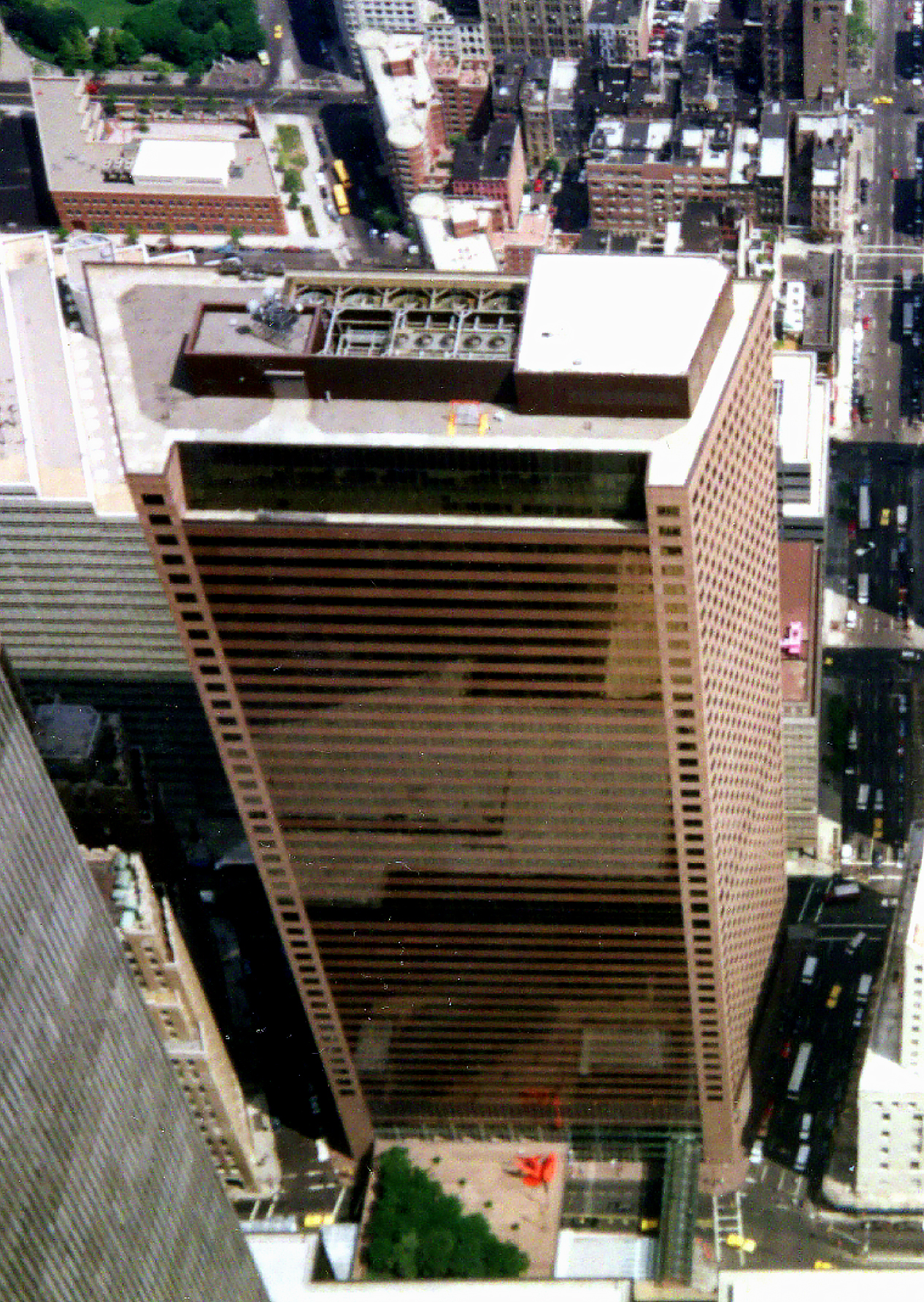
7 World Trade Center (1987–2001)

- 300 East 57th Street (1947)
- Paris Theater & Office Building (1948)
- 715 Park Avenue (1949)
- 945 Fifth Avenue Apartments (1949)
- Look Building, 488 Madison Avenue (1949)
- 40 Park Avenue (1950)
- 45 East End Avenue Apartments (1950)
- 85 East End Avenue, NE corner of E83rd St (1950)
- 575 Madison Avenue (1950)
- 2 Fifth Avenue (1952)
- 380 Madison Avenue (1953)
- 30 Park Avenue (1954)
- 555 Fifth Avenue (1954)
- 589 Fifth Avenue (1954)
- National Distillers Building (1954)
- 430 Park Avenue (Renovation) (1954)
- Baruch Houses (1954–1959)
- 460 Park Avenue (1955)
- Bank of Montreal Building (1955)
- Colgate-Palmolive Building (1955)
- Davies Building (1955)
- 156 William Street (1956)
- 415 Madison Avenue (1956)
- 485 Lexington Avenue (1956)
- 1430 Broadway (1956)
- 123 William Street (1957)
- 630 Third Avenue (1958)
- 750 Third Avenue (1958)
- 400 Madison Avenue (1958)
- General Reinsurance Building (1958)
- 100 Church Street (1958)
- 166 East 63rd Street (Beekman Town House) (1959)
- 2 Broadway (1959)
- 10 Lafayette Square (Buffalo, New York) (1959)
- 355 Lexington Avenue (1959)
- Bronx High School of Science (1959)
- Harriman National Bank Building (1959)
- Lorillard Building (1959)
- East Ohio Building (Cleveland, Ohio) (1959)
- 10 East 70th Street Apartments (1960)
- 80 Pine Street (1960)
- Imperial House, 150 East 69th Street (1960)
- Mutual of America Building (1960)
- 850 Third Avenue (1961)
- Pfizer Building (1961)
- Diamond National Building (1961)
- 60 Broad Street (1962)
- 215 East 68th Apartments (1962)
- 1180 Sixth Avenue (1962)
- Bankers Trust Building (1962)
- Tower East Apartments (1962)
- Hanover Bank Building (1962)
- 1212 Sixth Avenue (1963)
- 250 Broadway (1963)
- 605 Third Avenue, (f/k/a Neuberger Berman Building, originally the Burroughs Building) (1963)
- 845 Third Avenue (1963)
- 1290 Avenue of the Americas, the Neuberger Berman building (1963)
- MetLife Building (Pan Am Building) (1963)
- Donaldson, Lufkin & Jenrette Building (1963)
- 277 Park Avenue (1964)
- 641 Lexington Avenue (1964)
- Harcourt, Brace & World Building (1964)
- Sterling Drug Company Building (90 Park Avenue) (1964)
- 600 Madison Avenue (1965)
- Bankers Trust Annex Building (1965)
- Xerox Building (1965)
- MGM Building (1965)
- Leverett Saltonstall Building (1965)
- Financial Times Building (1965)
- 675 Third Avenue (1966)
- MacMillan Building (1966)
- 299 Park Avenue (a.k.a. Westvaco Building) (1967)
- 909 Third Avenue (1967)
- ITT-American Building (1967)
- General Motors Building (1968)
- 10 Hanover Square (1969)
- 100 Wall Street (1969)
- 345 Park Avenue (1969)
- 1700 Broadway (1969)
- 1345 Avenue of the Americas (1969)
- Random House Building (1969)
- Schroder Building (1969)
- Emigrant Savings Bank Building (1969)
- 77 Water Street (1970)
- 1633 Broadway (Paramount Plaza) (1970)
- 1133 Avenue of the Americas (formerly Interchem Building) (1970)
- 22 Cortlandt Street (1971)
- 200 Water Street (a.k.a. 127 John Street) (1971)
- 600 Third Avenue (1971)
- 888 Seventh Avenue (1971)
- Capitol-EMI Building (1971)
- Park Lane Hotel (New York) (1971)
- J.P. Stevens Company Tower (1971)
- One Battery Park Plaza (1971)
- 450 Park Avenue (1972)
- 55 Water Street (1972)
- 747 Third Avenue (1972)
- Harper & Row Building (1972)
- One Dag Hammarskjold Plaza (1972)
- Original 5 World Trade Center (1972)
- North American Plywood Building (1972)
- Franklin National Bank Building (1972)
- World Trade Center (1972–1973) with Minoru Yamasaki
- 100 East Pratt Street Building (1973)
- Blue Cross Building (1973)
- Merchandise Mart Building (1973)
- Sovereign Apartments (1973)
- Original 6 World Trade Center (1973)
- Winstar Building and Addition (1974)
- 100 William Street (1974)
- Original 4 World Trade Center (1975)
- Citigroup Center (1977)
- Helmsley Palace Hotel (1981)
- Crystal Pavilion (1982)
- St. James Tower at 415 East 54th Street (1982)
- 575 Fifth Avenue (1983)
- 900 Third Avenue (1983)
- 1155 Avenue of the Americas (1984)
- Manhattan Tower (1985)
- Symphony House Apartments (1986)
- Fifth Avenue Tower (1986)
- Original 7 World Trade Center (1987)
- Ellington Apartments (1987)
- 17 State Street (1988)
- 1585 Broadway (1989)
- 546 Fifth Avenue (1990)
- Oxford Condominiums (1990)
