= The Sovereign =

Residential skyscraper in Manhattan, New York

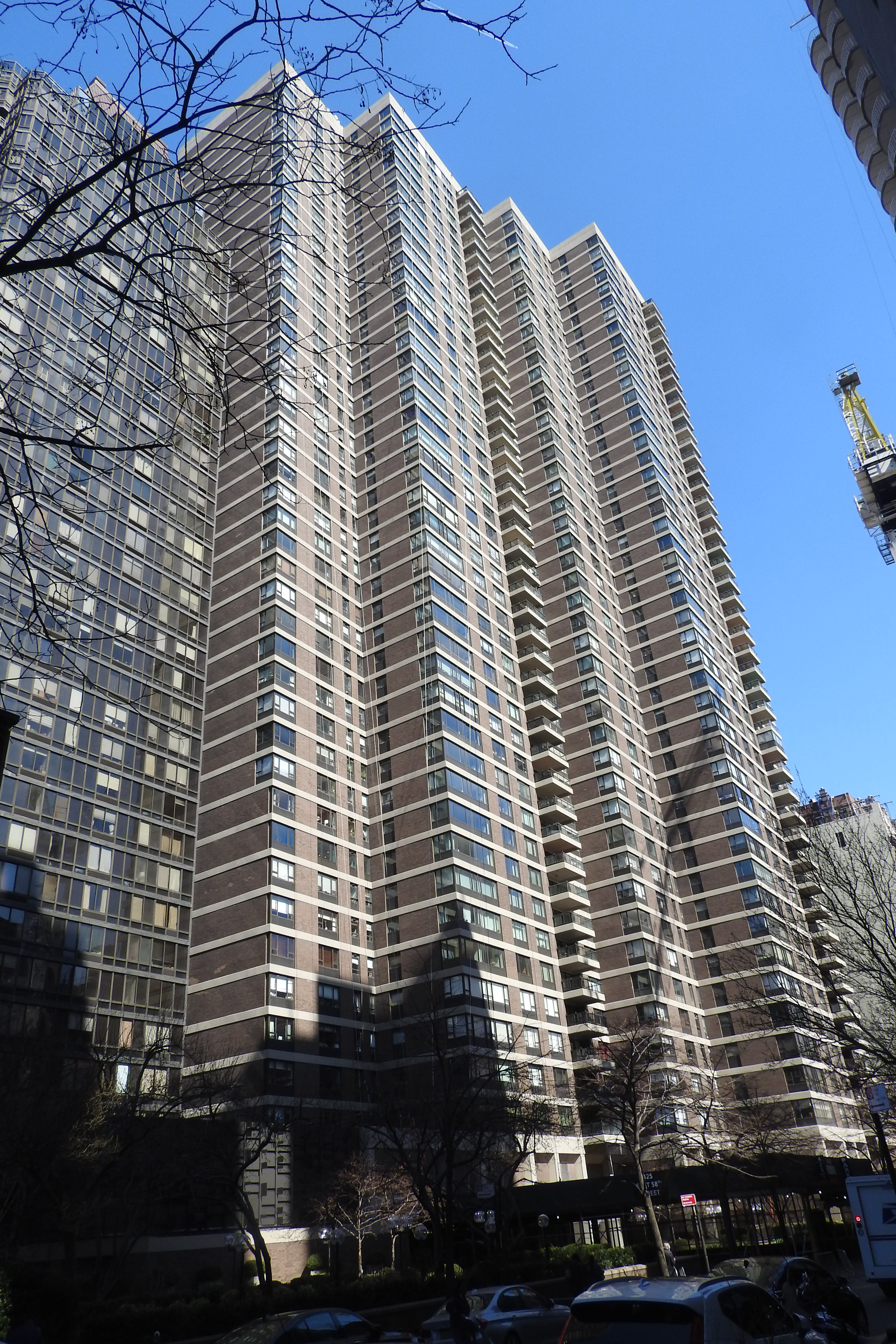
- Interactive map of the The Sovereign area

General information
- Type: cooperative
- Location: New York, New York, United States
- Coordinates: 40.7586°N 73.9612°W
- Completed: 1973

Technical details
- Structural system: Skyscraper
- Floor count: 48

Design and construction
- Architecture firm: Emery Roth & Sons

The Sovereign (or Sovereign Apartments) is a residential skyscraper in the East Midtown neighborhood of Manhattan in New York City, near the border with the Upper East Side. It is located at 425 East 58th Street east of First Avenue. The skyscraper was designed by Emery Roth & Sons in the International Style architectural style. It was built in 1973, and is 450 feet (140 m) tall, with 48 flights of stairs.
