= William H. Whyte =

American urbanist and sociologist (1917–1999)

- Born: William Hollingsworth Whyte Jr. July 11, 1917; West Chester, Pennsylvania, US
- Died: July 11, 1999 (aged 82); New York City, US
- Resting place: Oaklands Cemetery, West Chester, Pennsylvania, US
- Education: Princeton University
- Occupations: Sociologist, urbanist, writer
- Notable work: The Organization Man, The Social Life of Small Urban Spaces

William Hollingsworth "Holly" Whyte Jr. (July 11, 1917 – July 11, 1999) was an American urbanist, sociologist, organizational analyst, journalist and people-watcher. He identified the elements that create vibrant public spaces within the city and filmed a variety of urban plazas in New York City in the 1970s. After his book about corporate culture The Organization Man (1956) sold over two million copies, Whyte turned his attention to the study of human behavior in urban settings. He published several books and a film on the topic, including The Social Life of Small Urban Spaces (1980).

== Biography ==
Whyte was born in West Chester, Pennsylvania in 1917. An early graduate of St. Andrew's School in Middletown, Delaware, he graduated from Princeton University in 1939 and then served in Marine Corps between 1941 and 1944. He was commissioned and served as battalion intelligence officer with the 3rd Battalion, 1st Marines in the Guadalcanal campaign. He left Guadalcanal at the end of the campaign with a serious case of malaria that lingered for years. He spent the rest of the war lecturing and writing at the Marine Corps Staff and Command School at Quantico, Virginia, on the fighting qualities of the Japanese soldier.

In 1946 he joined Fortune Magazine where he remained until 1958.

In 1952, Whyte coined the term "Groupthink":

Groupthink being a coinage – and, admittedly, a loaded one – a working definition is in order. We are not talking about mere instinctive conformity – it is, after all, a perennial failing of mankind. What we are talking about is a rationalized conformity – an open, articulate philosophy which holds that group values are not only expedient but right and good as well.

Whyte wrote a 1956 bestseller titled The Organization Man after Fortune Magazine sponsored him to do extensive interviews on the CEOs of corporations such as General Electric and Ford.

While working with the New York City Planning Commission in 1969, Whyte began to use direct observation to describe behavior in urban settings. With research assistants wielding still cameras, movie cameras, and notebooks, Whyte described the substance of urban public life in an objective and measurable way. These observations developed into the "Street Life Project", an ongoing study of pedestrian behavior and city dynamics, and eventually to Whyte's books such as The Social Life of Small Urban Spaces (1980) and City: Rediscovering the Center (1988). "City" presents Whyte's conclusions about jaywalking, 'schmoozing patterns,' the actual use of urban plazas, appropriate sidewalk width, and other issues. This work remains valuable because it is based on careful observation, and because it contradicts other conventional wisdom, for instance, the idea that pedestrian traffic and auto traffic should be separated.

Whyte along with Project for Public Spaces worked closely on the renovation of Bryant Park in New York City.

Whyte served as mentor to many, including the urban-planning writer Jane Jacobs, Paco Underhill, who has applied the same technique to measuring and improving retail environments, Dan Biederman of Bryant Park Corporation, who led the renovation of Bryant Park and the Business Improvement District movement in New York City, Fred Kent, who worked with Whyte for a number of years before starting Project for Public Spaces, and future New York City Planning Commissioner, heiress and socialite Amanda Burden.

Whyte married fashion designer Jenny Bell Bechtel in 1964. They had one daughter, Alexandra Whyte.

He is interred at the Oaklands Cemetery in West Chester, Pennsylvania.

== Books ==
- Is Anybody Listening? (1952)
- The Organization Man (1956)
- The Exploding Metropolis (1958)
- Securing Open Spaces for Urban America (1959)
- Cluster Development (1964)
- The Last Landscape (1968)
- The Social Life of Small Urban Spaces (1980)
- City: Rediscovering the Center (1988)

== See also ==
- Fred Kent
- Placemaking
- Jan Gehl
