= Waldorf Astoria New York =

Hotel and residence in Manhattan, New York

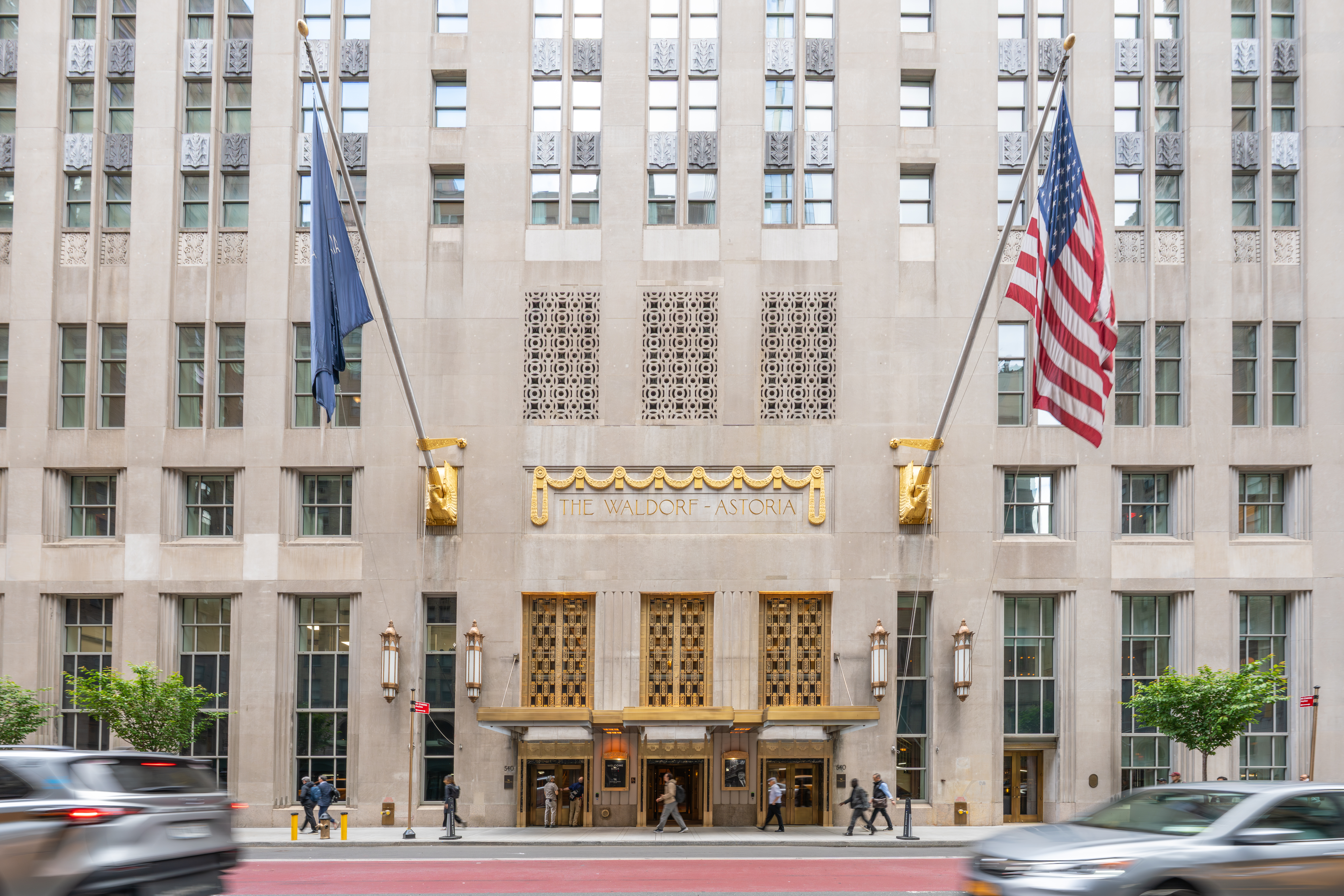
- The hotel entrance after renovations, 2026
- Hotel chain: Waldorf Astoria

General information
- Location: 301 Park Avenue; Manhattan, New York, U.S.
- Coordinates: 40°45′23″N 73°58′27″W
- Opened: October 1, 1931; 95 years ago
- Renovated: 2017–2025
- Owner: Dajia Insurance Group Co.
- Operator: Hilton Worldwide

Height
- Height: 625 ft (191 m)

Technical details
- Floor count: 47

Design and construction
- Architect: Schultze & Weaver

Other information
- Number of rooms: 375
- Number of restaurants: Peacock Alley; Bull and Bear Steakhouse; La Chine

Website
- Official hotel website

New York City Landmark
- Designated: January 5, 1993
- Reference no.: 1812
- Designated entity: Exterior

New York City Landmark
- Designated: March 7, 2017
- Reference no.: 2591
- Designated entity: Interior (ground through fourth floors, partial)

The Waldorf Astoria New York is a luxury hotel and residential condominium building in Midtown Manhattan, New York City. Located at 301 Park Avenue between 49th and 50th Streets, it is a 47-story, 625 ft (191 m) Art Deco structure designed by architects Schultze and Weaver and completed in 1931. The building was the world's tallest hotel until 1957, when it was surpassed by Moscow's Hotel Ukraina. An icon of glamor and luxury, the Waldorf Astoria is one of the world's most prestigious and best-known hotels. Both the exterior and the interior of the Waldorf Astoria are designated by the New York City Landmarks Preservation Commission as official landmarks.

The original Waldorf-Astoria, built in two stages in the 1890s, was demolished in 1929 to make way for the construction of the Empire State Building. Conrad Hilton acquired management rights to the hotel in October 1949, and the Hilton Hotels Corporation bought the hotel outright in 1972. It underwent a $150 million renovation by Lee Jablin in the 1980s and early 1990s. In 2009, the Waldorf Astoria and Towers had 1,416 rooms; the most expensive room, the Presidential Suite, was designed with Georgian-style furniture to emulate that of the White House.

The Anbang Insurance Group of China purchased the Waldorf Astoria New York for $1.95 billion in 2014, making it the most expensive hotel ever sold. Anbang closed the entire building in March 2017 for extensive renovations, converting the upper stories into 375 condominiums and retaining 375 hotel rooms on the lowest 18 floors. Dajia Insurance Group took over the Waldorf Astoria when Anbang went bankrupt in 2020, and, after several delays, the hotel reopened in July 2025. The hotel has three restaurants: Peacock Alley, Lex Yard and Yoshoku.

The Waldorf Astoria has been known for its lavish dinner parties and galas, often at the center of political and business conferences and fundraising schemes involving the rich and famous. After World War II, it played a significant role in world politics and the Cold War, culminating in the controversial World Peace Conference of March 1949. The Presidential Suite was the residence of Herbert Hoover for 20 years after his wife died, and Frank Sinatra kept a suite at the Waldorf from 1979 until 1988. Some of the luxury suites were named after celebrities who lived or stayed in them, including Cole Porter, the Duke and Duchess of Windsor, Douglas MacArthur, and Winston Churchill.

== Name ==
The first name of the hotel is ultimately derived from the town of Walldorf, which lies in the north of the German state of Baden-Württemberg, south of Mannheim and Heidelberg. The name of the town is derived from the German words Wald, meaning "forest", and Dorf, meaning "village". Walldorf is the ancestral home of the Astor family, the prominent German-American family to which the two side by side original hotels belonged, the Waldorf and the Astoria.

The hotels were soon joined by what was called peacock alley, and afterwards the hotel was known as the Waldorf-Astoria with a single hyphen, as recalled by a popular expression and song, "Meet Me at the Hyphen". The sign was changed to a double hyphen, looking similar to an equals sign, by Conrad Hilton when he purchased the hotel in 1949. The double hyphen visually represents "Peacock Alley", the hallway between the two original hotels on Fifth Avenue. The use of the double hyphen was discontinued by its parent company Hilton in 2009, shortly after the introduction of the Waldorf Astoria Hotels and Resorts chain.

== History ==
The original hotel in 1909

The original hotels on Fifth Avenue were built by feuding relatives. The Waldorf Hotel was opened in 1893, at the corner of Fifth Avenue and 33rd Street, on the former site of millionaire developer William Waldorf Astor's mansion. In 1897, Waldorf's cousin, John Jacob Astor IV, opened the Astoria Hotel on an adjacent site where his mansion had been. The hotels were initially built as separate structures but were intended to be connected by an alley. The hotel subsequently became known as the "Waldorf-Astoria", the largest hotel in the world at the time.

From the early 20th century, the hotel faced stiff competition from newer hotels in New York City such as the Hotel Astor (1904), St. Regis (1904), the Knickerbocker (1906), and the Savoy-Plaza (1927). By the 1920s, the Waldorf Astoria was becoming dated, and the elegant social life of New York had moved much farther north. The Astor family sold the hotel to the developers of the Empire State Building, closing the hotel in 1929 and demolishing it soon after.

=== Development of new location ===
The idea of a new Waldorf-Astoria hotel was based on the concept that a large, opulent hotel should be available in New York for distinguished visitors. Financial backing was not difficult to get in the summer of 1929, as times were prosperous. The stock market had not yet crashed, nor had the Depression arrived. However, before ground was broken for the new building, some of the investors became dubious about whether this was the right time to be investing in a luxury hotel. The land for the new hotel was formerly owned by the New York Central Railroad, which had operated a power plant for Grand Central Terminal on the site. New York Central had promised $10 million toward the building of the new Waldorf-Astoria. The railroad and all the other investors decided to honor their commitments and take their chances with the uncertain financial climate. In October 1929, the Hotel Waldorf-Astoria Corporation obtained a 26-year lease from New York Central, and placed a $11 million first mortgage on the site.

On March 24, 1930, the first steel column in the new hotel was installed, and stonework installation began on June 3. The hotel's construction required massive amounts of materials, including 10,000 metal door frames, 11 million bricks, 2.695 million square feet (250,400 m^{2}) of gypsum and terracotta partition blocks, and 1.2 million square feet (110,000 m^{2}) of concrete floors. The new Waldorf Astoria had gold-plated doorknobs on eight stories, and its guestrooms, totaling 20.487 million cubic feet (580,100 m^{3}), made the hotel the most spacious in New York City. It used 27,100 short tons (24,200 long tons; 24,600 t) of steel, more than in the Woolworth Building. Several crews of workers labored simultaneously, and not all of them consulted with each other, leading to inconsistencies in the design. The hotel's steel frame topped out, 625 feet (191 m) above street level, on October 22, 1930. The last stone on the Waldorf Astoria's facade was installed at a ceremony on February 4, 1931.

On October 1, 1931, the new building opened on Park Avenue, between 49th and 50th streets, following a soft opening the previous day. It was the tallest and largest hotel in the world at the time, covering the entire block. The slender central tower became known as the Waldorf Towers, with its own private entrance on 50th Street, and consisted of 100 suites, about one-third of which were leased as private residences. NBC received the exclusive right to broadcast events and music from the hotel and to book live entertainment there. President Herbert Hoover said on the radio, broadcast from the White House: "The opening of the new Waldorf Astoria is an event in the advancement of hotels, even in New York City. It carries great tradition in national hospitality ... marks the measure of nation's growth in power, in comfort and in artistry ... an exhibition of courage and confidence to the whole nation". About 2,000 people were in the ballroom listening to this speech, but by the end of the business day, the 2,200-room hotel had only 500 occupants.

The hotel contained several innovations for its time. The Waldorf Astoria contained phones that rang automatically, a first for its time; teletype devices; a telephone extension in each of the 1,550 two-bedroom suites; and a telephone switchboard that served 2,535 extensions. There were radios in all 2,000 guestrooms and in 15 public rooms, connected by 190 miles (310 km) of wire. 140 suites on the upper stories had provision for privately owned receivers. Soon after the hotel opened, hotelier Conrad Hilton, almost bankrupt at the time, reportedly cut out a photograph of the hotel from a magazine and wrote across it, "The Greatest of Them All". Nonetheless, the Waldorf-Astoria did not begin operating at a profit until 1939. Lucius Boomer continued to manage the hotel in the 1930s and 1940s, a commanding figure to whom Tony Rey referred as "the greatest hotelman of his era". Boomer was elected chairman of the board of the Waldorf-Astoria Corporation on February 20, 1945, a position he held until his death in July 1947.

=== Early years and international politics ===
Like the original hotel, from its inception, the Waldorf Astoria gained worldwide renown for its glamorous dinner parties and galas, often at the center of political and business conferences and fundraising schemes. Author Ward Morehouse III has referred to the Waldorf Astoria as "comparable to great national institutions" and a "living symbol deep within our collective consciousness". It had the "greatest banquet department in the world" at the time according to restaurateur Tom Margittai, with the center of activity being the Grand Ballroom. On August 3, 1932, some 200 people representing the "cream of New York's literary world" attended the Waldorf Astoria to honor Pearl S. Buck, the author of The Good Earth, which was the best-selling novel in the United States in 1931 and 1932. One dinner alone, a relatively "small dinner" attended by some 50 people in June 1946, raised over $250,000.

External image
- Photograph of the Waldorf Astoria's elegant Starlight Roof in 1935; Here on Getty images

During the 1930s and 1940s the hotel's guests were also entertained at the elegant "Starlight Roof" nightclub by the Waldorf-Astoria Orchestra and such noted musicians as: Xavier Cugat, Eddie Duchin, Lester Lanin and Glenn Miller. In the Wedgwood Room, guests dined during performances by entertainers including Frank Sinatra, Victor Borge, the Mischa Borr Orchestra, with John Serry, the Leo Reisman Orchestra, Annamary Dickey, Corinna Mura, Paul Draper, and Gracie Fields.

The hotel played a considerable role in the emerging Cold War and international relations during the postwar years, staging numerous events and conferences. On March 15, 1946, Winston Churchill, who had recently given his Iron Curtain speech, attended and addressed a welcoming dinner at the hotel given by Governor Thomas E. Dewey, and from November 4 to December 12, 1946, the Big Four Conference was held in Jørgine Boomer's apartment on the 37th floor of the Towers. On November 24, 1947, 48 prominent figures of the Hollywood film industry met at the Waldorf Astoria and discussed what would become the Waldorf Statement, banning people with Communist beliefs or tendencies from the Hollywood film industry, initially aimed at the Hollywood Ten and becoming the blacklist. On June 21, 1948, a press conference at the hotel introduced the LP record.

From March 27 to 29, 1949, the Cultural and Scientific Conference for World Peace, also known as the Waldorf World Peace Conference, was held at the hotel to discuss the emerging Cold War and the growing divide between the US and the Soviet Union. The event was organized by the struggling American Communist Party and was attended by the likes of Soviet Foreign Minister Andrey Vyshinsky, composer and pianist Dmitri Shostakovich, and writer Alexsander Fadeyev. It was picketed by anti-Stalinists running under the banner of America for Intellectual Freedom, and prominent individuals such as Irving Howe, Dwight Macdonald, Mary McCarthy and Robert Lowell.

In 1954, Israeli statesman and archaeologist Yigael Yadin met secretly with the Syriac Orthodox Archbishop Mar Samuel in the basement of the Waldorf-Astoria Hotel to negotiate the purchase of four Dead Sea Scrolls for Israel; Yadin paid $250,000 for all four scrolls. (Note: Professor Elazar L. Sukenik was first offered the scrolls in 1947 by an antiquities dealer in Bethlehem. Because of the recent partitioning of Palestine, Jews were not permitted to travel there. Sukenik disguised himself as an Arab to travel to the city. He was allowed to examine the scrolls and to take a small fragment of one for testing. When he made the trip back to Bethlehem to purchase them the next day, he found that the dealer had been pressured into selling them to the Syriac Orthodox Church. Archbishop Mar Samuel offered to sell them to Sukenik for $125,000; before the transaction could take place, Mar Samuel's life was threatened and he fled to the United States. Sukenik died in 1953 without a further word about the whereabouts of the scrolls. In 1954, a classified ad appeared in The Wall Street Journal offering to sell the four scrolls. Yigael Yadin, the son of Professor Sukenik, was visiting the United States when the ad appeared and someone brought it to his attention. The State of Israel then planned to secretly buy the scrolls.) Among the hotel's notable events was the April in Paris Ball, a gala event whose mission was to improve Franco-American relations, share cultures, assist US and French charities, and commemorate the 2,000th anniversary of the founding of Paris. Established by the hotel's banquet manager Claude Philippe in 1952, it was managed mostly by socialites; the ball was hosted annually until 1959.

Hilton acquired management rights to the hotel on October 12, 1949. Restaurateur George Lang began working at the Waldorf Astoria Hotel in 1955, and on December 13, 1955, he helped organize the American Theatre Wing's First Night Ball to celebrate Helen Hayes's 50th year in show business. He did much to organize dinners at the Waldorf to assist with Hungarian issues and relief. On one occasion, an event was attended by Edward G. Robinson and pianist Doklady and some $60,000 was raised. Under Hilton's ownership, the lobby was refurbished in the 1950s and again in the 1960s.

=== Late 20th century ===
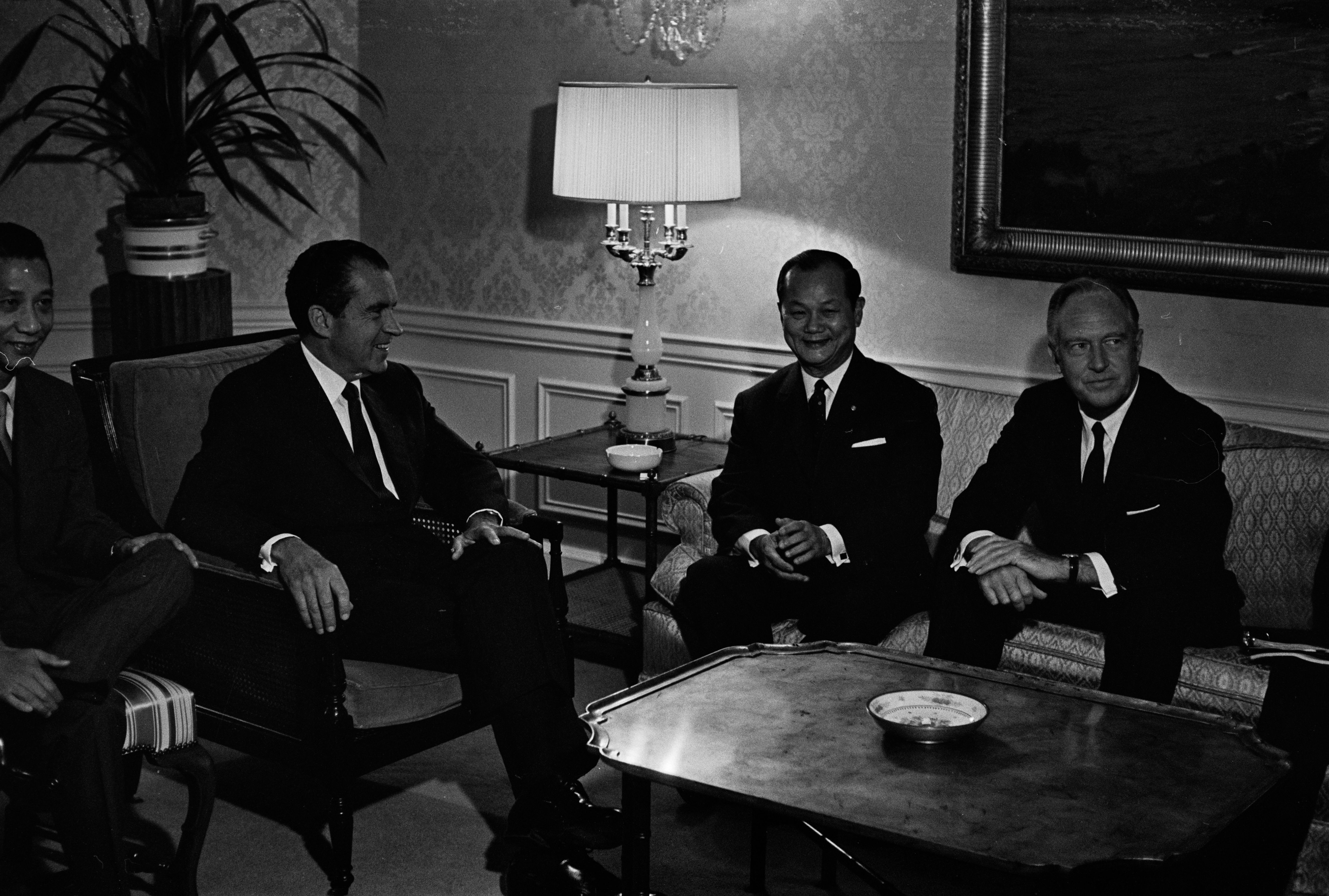
President Richard Nixon (left) and Secretary of State William P. Rogers (right) meet with South Vietnamese Foreign Minister Trần Văn Lắm at the Waldorf Astoria, September 18, 1969

By 1959, the hotel emerged as the annual host for live broadcasts from the ballroom by Guy Lombardo and his Royal Canadians Orchestra during New Year's Eve celebrations. Lasting until 1976, these broadcasts were carried worldwide on CBS and invariably concluded at midnight with a performance of "Auld Lang Syne". Time observed that the American public would simply not believe it was New Year's Day unless Guy Lombardo heralded its arrival from the Waldorf Astoria Hotel. Time celebrated its 40th anniversary at the hotel on May 6, 1963, at an event attended by some 1,500 celebrities. When Pope Paul VI made the first papal visit to the United States in 1965, he met with U.S. president Lyndon B. Johnson at the Waldorf Astoria. In 1968, British rock band The Who checked into the hotel and were reportedly banned from the hotel for life; however, they were allowed to visit the hotel in 1990, when they performed at their Rock and Roll Hall of Fame induction.

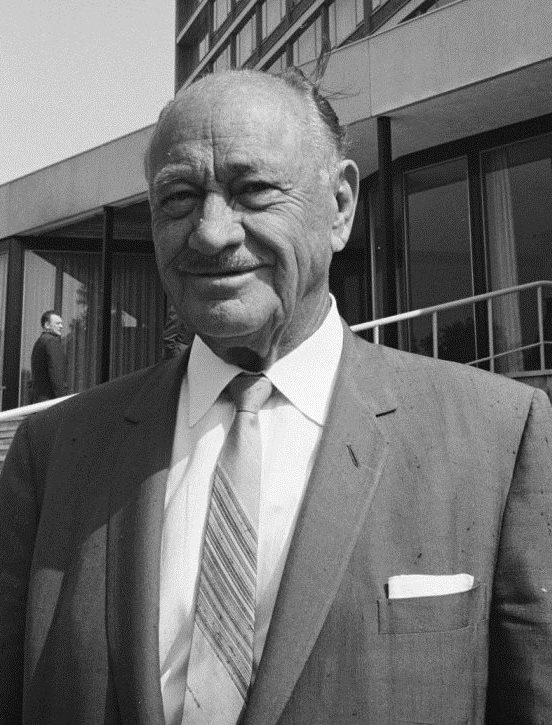
Conrad Hilton

In 1972, the Hilton Hotels Corporation bought the hotel outright from New York Central's successor, Penn Central. In the 1970s, the Waldorf Astoria continued to play an important role in international politics, particularly between the US and the Middle East. In November 1974, the hotel was placed on high alert when a "20-car motorcade, with eight shotgun-toting police marksmen aboard in bullet-proof vests" brought Palestinian Fatah party leader Farouk Kaddoumi to the Waldorf from John F. Kennedy International Airport. In December 1974, President Ford met with Nelson Rockefeller after he was voted vice president, and a 90-minute press conference was held in a suite in the hotel.

In November 1975, the US government insisted that PLO leader Yasser Arafat stay at the Waldorf during his visit to America, against the wishes of the hotel staff; security was stepped up severely. On August 12, 1981, IBM unveiled its Personal Computer in a press conference at the Waldorf Astoria. The National Basketball Association held its first-ever draft lottery between non-playoff teams at the Starlight Roof for the 1985 NBA draft.

Lee Jablin, of Harman Jablin Architects, fully renovated and upgraded the property during the mid-1980s through the mid-1990s in a $150 million ($491 million in 2025 dollars) renovation. The main lobby was renovated in 1986 as part of the project, and the hotel was also downsized from 1,800 to 1,700 rooms. The New York City Landmarks Preservation Commission (LPC) designated the Waldorf Astoria's exterior as a New York City landmark in January 1993, which prevented Hilton from demolishing or altering the hotel's facade without the LPC's permission. At the time, Hilton did not have any plans to alter the hotel's facade.

=== 21st century ===
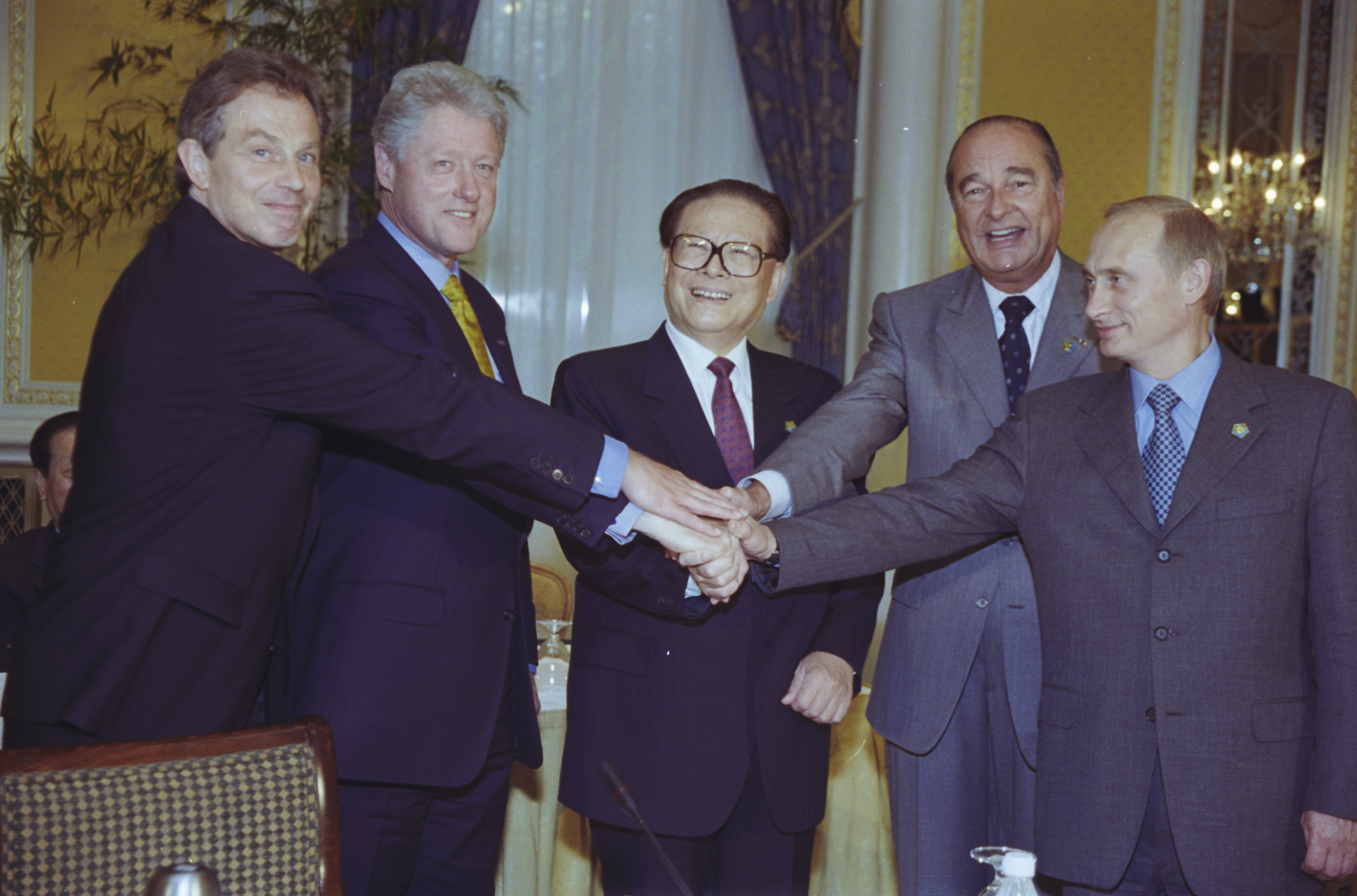
British Prime Minister Tony Blair, U.S. President Bill Clinton, Chinese President Jiang Zemin, French President Jacques Chirac, and Russian President Vladimir Putin at the Waldorf Astoria on September 7, 2000

On May 27, 2001, the Eastern Diocese of the Armenian Church of America had a grand banquet at the hotel to celebrate the 1700th anniversary of Armenia's conversion to Christianity, with Ambassador Edward Djerejian as guest speaker. On May 7, 2004, a press conference was held by MGM, discussing Steve Martin's The Pink Panther of the Pink Panther series. The 5th Annual DGA Honors Gala was held at the Waldorf on September 29.

In 2006, Hilton launched Waldorf Astoria Hotels & Resorts, a brand named for the hotel. Branches of the Waldorf Astoria were launched in Arizona, California, Florida, Hawaii, and Louisiana in the United States, and abroad in France, Israel, Italy, and Saudi Arabia. In 2006, Hilton was reported to be considering opening a new Waldorf Astoria hotel on the Las Vegas Strip. In 2008, the Waldorf Astoria opened the Guerlain and Spa Chakra, Inc. spa at the hotel, as part of the Waldorf Astoria Collection. The Waldorf Astoria New York is a member of Historic Hotels of America, the official program of the National Trust for Historic Preservation. "The Towers of the Waldorf Astoria" continued to operate as a boutique "hotel within a hotel".

==== Anbang acquisition and conversion ====
In October 2014, Chinese company Anbang Insurance Group bought the Waldorf Astoria New York from Hilton for $1.95 billion, making it the most expensive hotel ever sold at the time. A Chinese restaurant, La Chine, opened at the Waldorf Astoria late the following year. Anbang's founder Wu Xiaohui wanted to convert the Waldorf Astoria into a five-star hotel with condominiums and large units, discussing with several local developers about the possibility of partnering on the redevelopment.

On July 1, 2016, Anbang announced plans to refurbish the hotel and turn some rooms into condominiums, The Towers of the Waldorf Astoria. Under the plan, some of the hotel's rooms would be turned into condominium apartments, while the remaining guestrooms would be operated by Hilton. The final event in the Grand Ballroom, on February 28, 2017, was a charity gala celebrating NewYork-Presbyterian Hospital with Stevie Wonder playing. The hotel closed the next day, March 1, 2017. The restaurants, which were all closed, were planned to reopen when the renovation was completed. On March 7, the LPC voted unanimously to list the interiors of many of the hotel's public spaces as New York City landmarks, protecting them from major alterations; the designation covered about 62,000 square feet (5,800 m^{2}). Skidmore, Owings & Merrill (SOM) was hired to renovate the hotel's interior and preserve the landmark-protected rooms, and Suffolk Construction was hired as the general contractor.

Public spaces like the Grand Ballroom and Peacock Alley were refurbished as part of the project. The hotel rooms were planned to be on the lowest 18 floors. Jean-Louis Deniot redesigned the apartments and amenity areas, Pierre-Yves Rochon refurbished the hotel rooms, and AvroKO designed a new restaurant space. ArtCare Conservation was hired to redesign the hotel's murals, and the historical woodwork, metalwork, and plasterwork was renovated or replaced. The windows were enlarged to comply with revised building codes. At its busiest point, the renovation project employed 1,000 workers each day. SOM estimated that 96% of the hotel's interior was replaced entirely, although the landmarked portions of the interior were refurbished. Wu had contemplated adding several other features to the hotel, including a billionaires' private club and a private gym.

==== Completion of renovation and Hilton takeover ====
The Park Avenue facade of the hotel, seen in November 2025

In early 2018, the Chinese government took over the Waldorf Astoria and Anbang's other assets for one year, alleging economic crimes by Anbang. This prompted the cancellation of plans for the private club and gym. In November 2019, it was announced that the 375 condos in the Waldorf-Astoria would go on sale early the next year, while the 375 remaining hotel rooms would not reopen until 2021. Following Anbang's bankruptcy in 2020, Dajia Insurance Group Co. took over Anbang's American assets, including the Waldorf Astoria. Sales of the Waldorf-Astoria's condos began that March. By late 2020, the hotel was set to open at the end of 2022; however, by March 2021, the timeline had been postponed to early 2023. The renovation of the Waldorf Astoria stalled in mid-2022 as the project exceeded its $2 billion budget, and the Chinese government considered selling the building or partnering with another developer. According to The Wall Street Journal, this had pushed the renovation back to at least 2024. Further complications arose due to various workplace accidents, including the death of a worker.

In March 2023, news media reported that the building would not reopen until 2025 at the earliest. Hilton Hotels & Resorts hired a leadership team in April 2024 in advance of the hotel's expected reopening later that year. In October 2024, the hotel's reopening was postponed yet again to early 2025. In addition, the chef Michael Anthony was hired that November to operate Lex Yard, the hotel's main restaurant. Hilton began allowing guests to make reservations the next month in preparation for the hotel's reopening, and the first condos went on sale at that time. The first buyers finalized their purchases in February 2025. The firm Douglas Elliman was hired to sell the condos. Jay Neveloff was hired as an adviser for the hotel's renovation and residential conversion, and Neveloff's law firm, Kramer Levin Naftalis & Frankel, handled legal aspects of the condo conversion.

The hotel reopened on July 15, 2025, with 375 rooms. Initially, only three restaurants were open. The hotel's meeting facilities and ballroom reopened on September 5, 2025, followed by the Guerlain Wellness Spa in October 2025. By late September, most of the guestrooms were open to the public, and over 30 condos had been sold. Due to the acquisition fees, renovation fees, and cost overruns, the redevelopment's total cost was estimated at $6 billion. By February 2026, Anbang planned to sell the hotel.

== Architecture ==
The hotel was designed by architects Schultze and Weaver and constructed at 301 Park Avenue, between 49th and 50th Streets, several blocks north of Grand Central Terminal. The hotel occupies an entire city block, measuring 405 feet (123 m) wide between Park Avenue to the west and Lexington Avenue to the east, and 200 feet (61 m) deep between 49th Street to the south and 50th Street to the north. The hotel was developed atop the existing railroad tracks leading to the station as part of the Terminal City complex, using the air rights above the tracks.

Travel America stated: "To linger in the sumptuous salons of the Waldorf-Astoria is to step back in time. Your trip down memory lane is a flashback to the glamor days of the 1930s when this Art Deco masterpiece was the tallest hotel in the world and the epicenter of elite society. A legendary limestone landmark occupying a whole block of prime real estate in midtown Manhattan, it's still a prestigious address that embodies luxury and power in the richest city on earth."

=== Form and facade ===
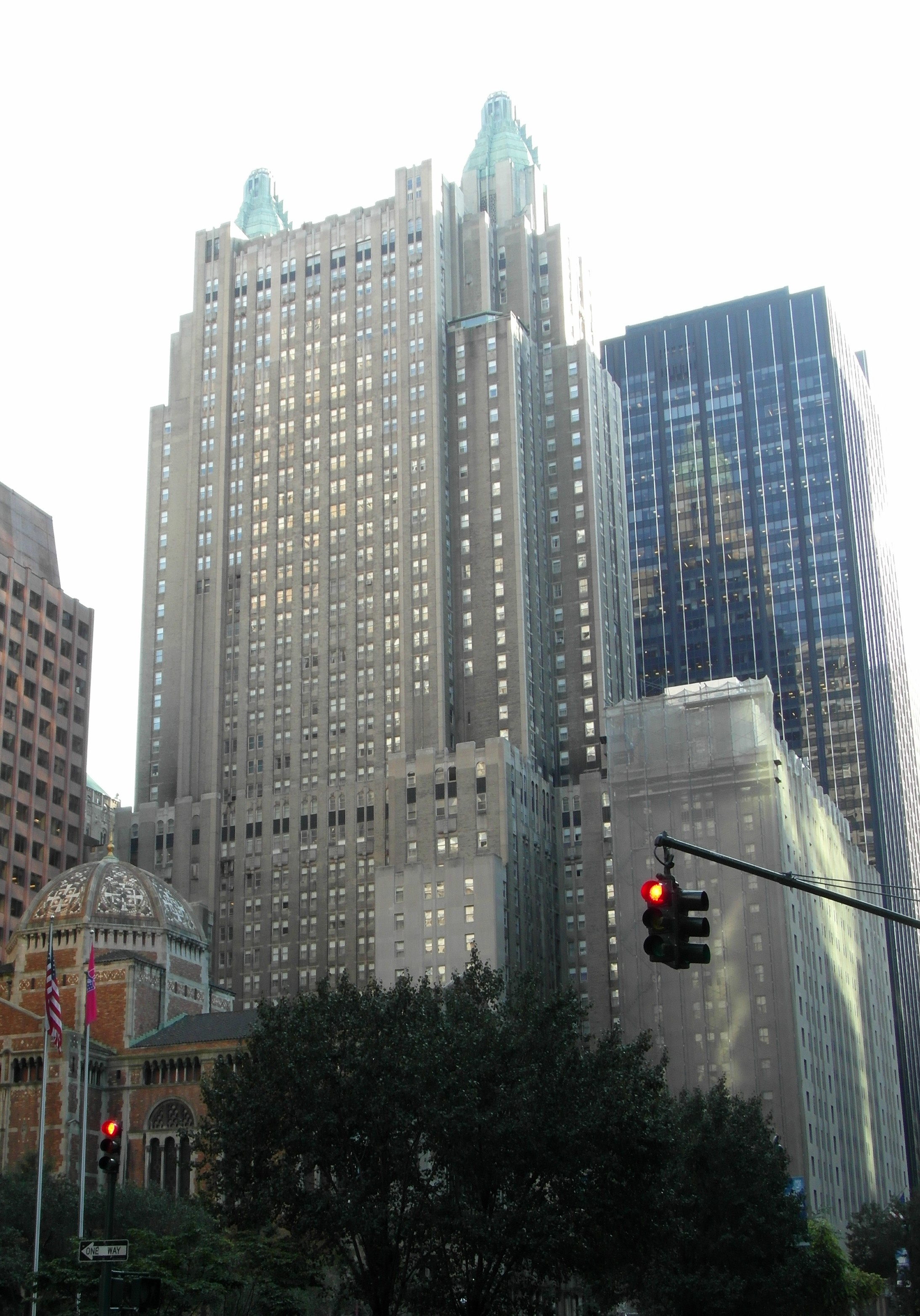
The hotel from the north, with St. Bart's visible in the foreground

The 47-story, 625 ft (191 m) hotel, was the tallest and largest hotel in the world for several years after its completion. The structure uses 1,585 cubic feet (44.9 m^{3}) of black marble imported from Belgium, 600 cubic feet (17 m^{3}) of Brech Montalto and 260 cubic feet (7.4 m^{3}) of Alps Green from Italy, and some 300 antique mantels. In addition, 200 railroad cars brought some 800,000 cubic feet (23,000 m^{3}) of limestone for the building's facing, 27,100 tons of steel for the skeleton superstructure, and 2.595 million square feet (241,100 m^{2}) of terra cotta and gypsum block. The hotel is accessed by six bronze-and-nickel doorways, three each on Park and Lexington Avenues, all measuring 13 feet (4.0 m) wide and 31 feet (9.4 m) high.

The massing of the hotel rises from a pair of 20-story-high slabs at the base, which run parallel to Park and Lexington Avenues. The slabs contain setbacks at the 18th story on their western elevation and at the 13th and 16th stories on the eastern elevation. The slab on Park Avenue contained a retractable metal and glass roof above the 18th and 19th stories, above the Starlight Roof nightclub. The slabs are covered with gray limestone and lack colorful ornamentation. The facade of the lower stories is divided vertically into numerous bays, which contain recessed windows and spandrel panels. There are three patterns of spandrels on the western and eastern elevations of the facade, facing Park and Lexington Avenues respectively. Gilded letters with the hotel's name are placed above the entrances on either avenue. On Park Avenue, the letters are flanked by representations of maidens.

Above the 20th story, the hotel rises as a single slab to the 42nd story. This slab is oriented parallel to the side streets and is also faced in gray limestone. The 42-story slab is topped by a pair of towers. The tops of the towers contain bronze-and-glass lanterns measuring 15 feet (4.6 m) high and 15 feet wide. The upper stories of the towers are faced in brick, which was intentionally designed to match the stonework on the lower stories. The use of brick led many to believe that the builders ran out of money. The Waldorf Astoria's facade has undergone few changes over the years, except for the installation of openings for air conditioners; replacement of aluminum windows; and modifications to storefronts, marquees, and entrances at ground level.

=== Interior ===
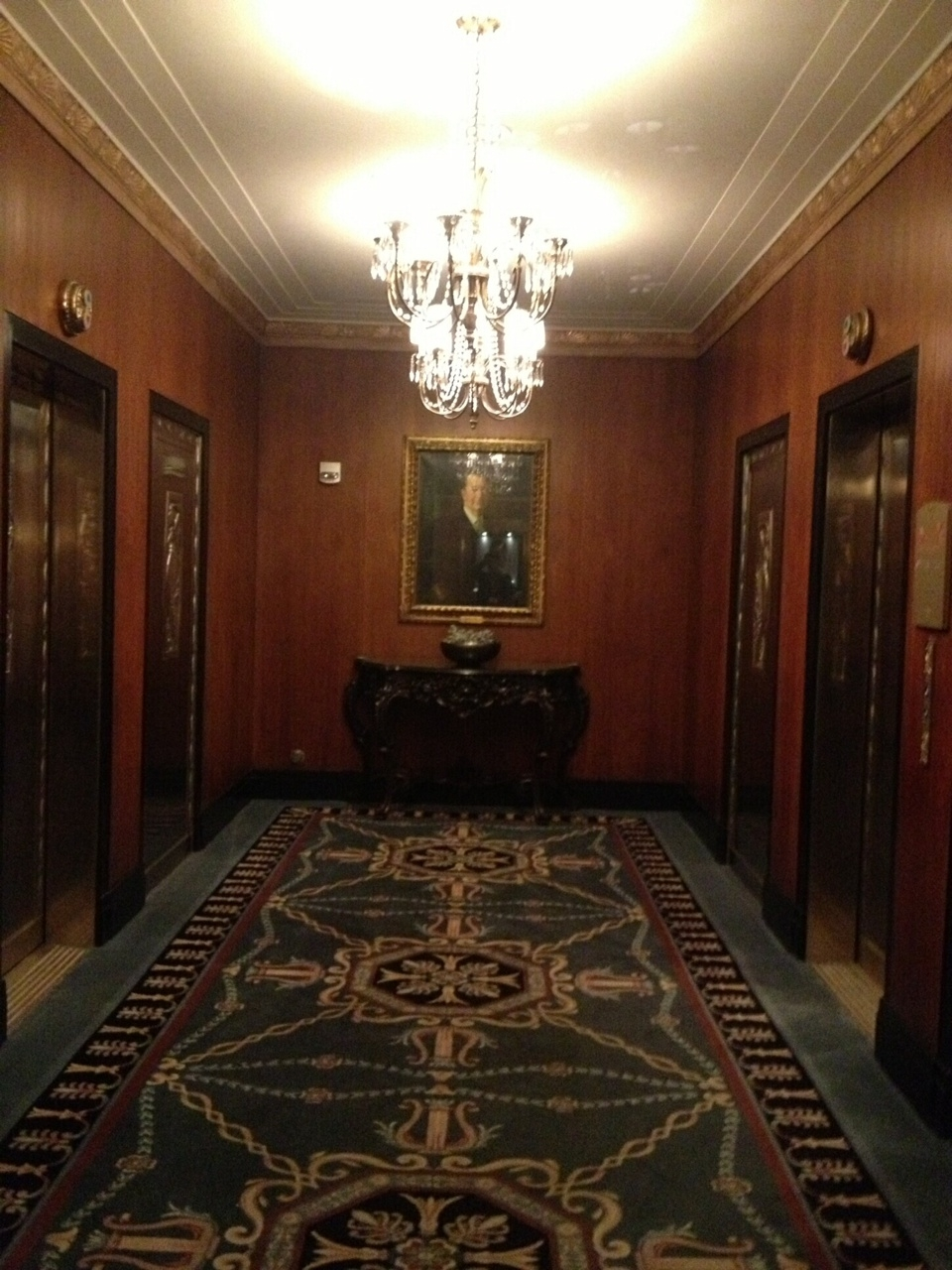
The elevator lobby

Frommer's has cited the hotel as an "icon of luxury", and highlights the "wide stately corridors, the vintage Deco door fixtures, the white-gloved bellmen, the luxe shopping arcade", the "stunning round mosaic under an immense crystal chandelier", and the "free-standing Waldorf clock, covered with bronze relief figures" in the main lobby. The first, third, fourth, and 18th floors were dedicated entirely to public rooms and spaces. Many of the public areas used indirect lighting, with lightbulbs concealed in objects such as lamps and vases, "so as to create a restful atmosphere". Tours are conducted of the hotel for guests.

==== Ground level ====
The hotel is accessed by two foyers at ground level: one on Park Avenue to the west and one on Lexington Avenue to the east. The entire hotel is arranged around the west–east axis connecting the two foyers. Three vestibules at the middle of the Park Avenue elevation contain metal-and-glass doors that lead to the foyer there. The center vestibule is composed of a limestone frame, which projects slightly inward and contains two revolving doors. The vestibules on either side contain doors that swing outward, as well as ornate nickel-bronze metalwork. There are nickel-bronze grilles between each of the vestibule, as well as large windows on the west wall, illuminating the space. These large windows are divided by wide mullions with bas-reliefs, and they also have pierced metal screens. Stairs on the east wall lead up to the Park Avenue lobby.

The Lexington Avenue foyer is at the center of the Lexington Avenue elevation and also contains nickel-bronze decorations. The east wall has three vestibules with metal-and-glass doors leading to the street. The center vestibule is a revolving door within a curved frame, while the other vestibules have doors that swing outward. Above the vestibules are grilles, wood paneling, and beveled mirrors. The west wall contains escalators to the north and a stairway to the south, which ascend to the lobby level, as well as a hallway leading to additional spaces at ground level.

A private driveway, measuring 90 feet (27 m) wide and 200 feet (61 m) long, was built from 49th to 50th Street. Similar to the old Waldorf-Astoria's 34th Street carriageway, this allowed private vehicles and taxis to drop off and pick up guests without blocking traffic. The driveway led to a parking lot with 300 spaces.

==== Lobby level ====
Unlike in other American hotels, the lobby story of the Waldorf Astoria is raised one story above ground level, which both created the impression of grandeur and allowed storefronts to be placed at ground level. Many rooms contained murals from both 18th-century and contemporary artists. For example, the men's cafe contained a map of the New York metropolitan area with notable golf courses. Another dining room, at 50th Street and Park Avenue, had canvases painted by Josep Maria Sert, gold walls, and a silver ceiling.

===== Park Avenue lobby and colonnade =====
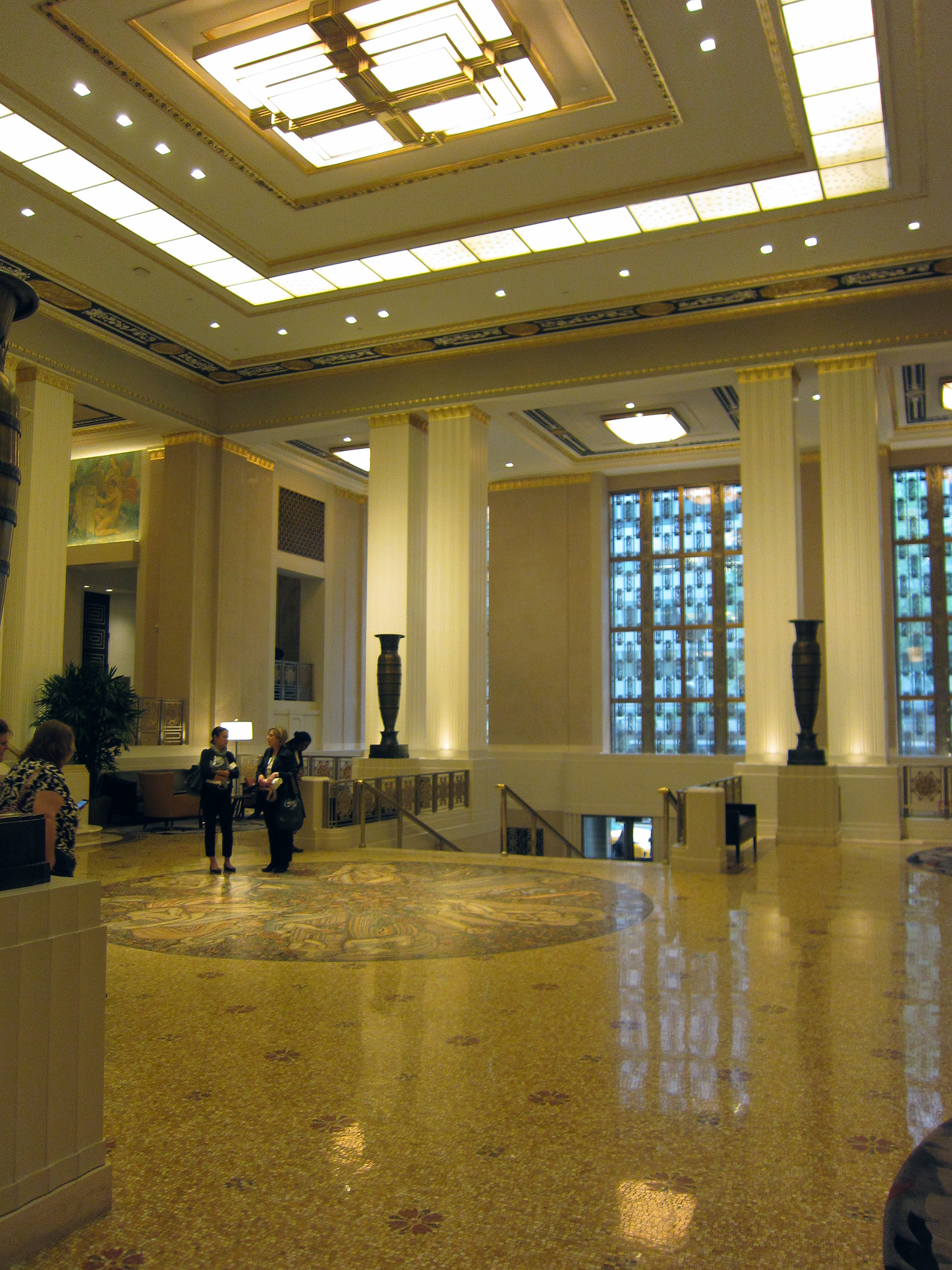
The Park Avenue lobby

On the west side of the lobby level is the Park Avenue lobby, also called the main foyer; it is accessed from the Park Avenue foyer and is illuminated by that foyer's windows. The LPC describes the space as being in the Pompeian style. The Park Avenue lobby is surrounded by raised terraces on the north and south walls, the Park Avenue foyer to the west, and the colonnade to the east. The north terrace connects with the Empire Room, while the south terrace connects with the Vanderbilt Room; both terraces have an alcove to the west and a stair to the east. The Park Avenue lobby contains classical-style square columns. There are also pastoral murals by Louis Rigal, which are made of 148,000 stone fragments. The center of the Park Avenue lobby has a stepped ceiling, the terraces and Park Avenue foyer have painted panels on their ceilings, and the terraces' alcoves have metallic-trim ceilings.

The Park Avenue Colonnade connects the Park Avenue lobby to the west and the West Lounge to the east. The space is divided into three aisles by two colonnades of square columns. The mosaic floor contains rosette motifs surrounded by a travertine frame. Each wall is made of painted plaster with limestone pilasters, wainscoting, and white-metal doors. The men's room and cloakroom are on the north wall, while the ladies' room and shoe-shine room are on the south wall; a set of metal-and-glass doors originally led to the West Lounge. The center aisle has a coved ceiling with indirect lighting and metal finishes, while the north and south aisles have paneled ceilings similar to those above the Park Avenue lobby's terraces.

The west lounge is known as the Peacock Alley and runs north–south, connecting the Park Avenue lobby and colonnade to the west and the west elevator bank to the east. It contains wooden paneled walls and red-marble pilasters with silver Ionic capitals. The northern portion of the west lounge has been converted into a restaurant area. This space contains the Peacock Alley restaurant, which includes the main restaurant, a bar and lounge, and three private dining salons. The southern portion remains intact and contains a set of decorative metal gates that formerly led to a beauty salon. In the mid-20th century, the Peacock Alley was redecorated with blue-enamel walls and golden palm trees; the space's original appearance, consisting of wood-paneled walls and black marble columns, was restored in 2025. There was also a check-in area in the Peacock Alley until 2025.

The west elevator lobby consists of a bank of six elevators with stainless steel doors that contain bas-reliefs of women. The elevator lobby also has a carpet, wooden paneling around the elevator doors, and a stepped ceiling with crystal chandelier. The elevators are furnished with paneled pollard oak and Carpathian elm.

===== Main lobby =====
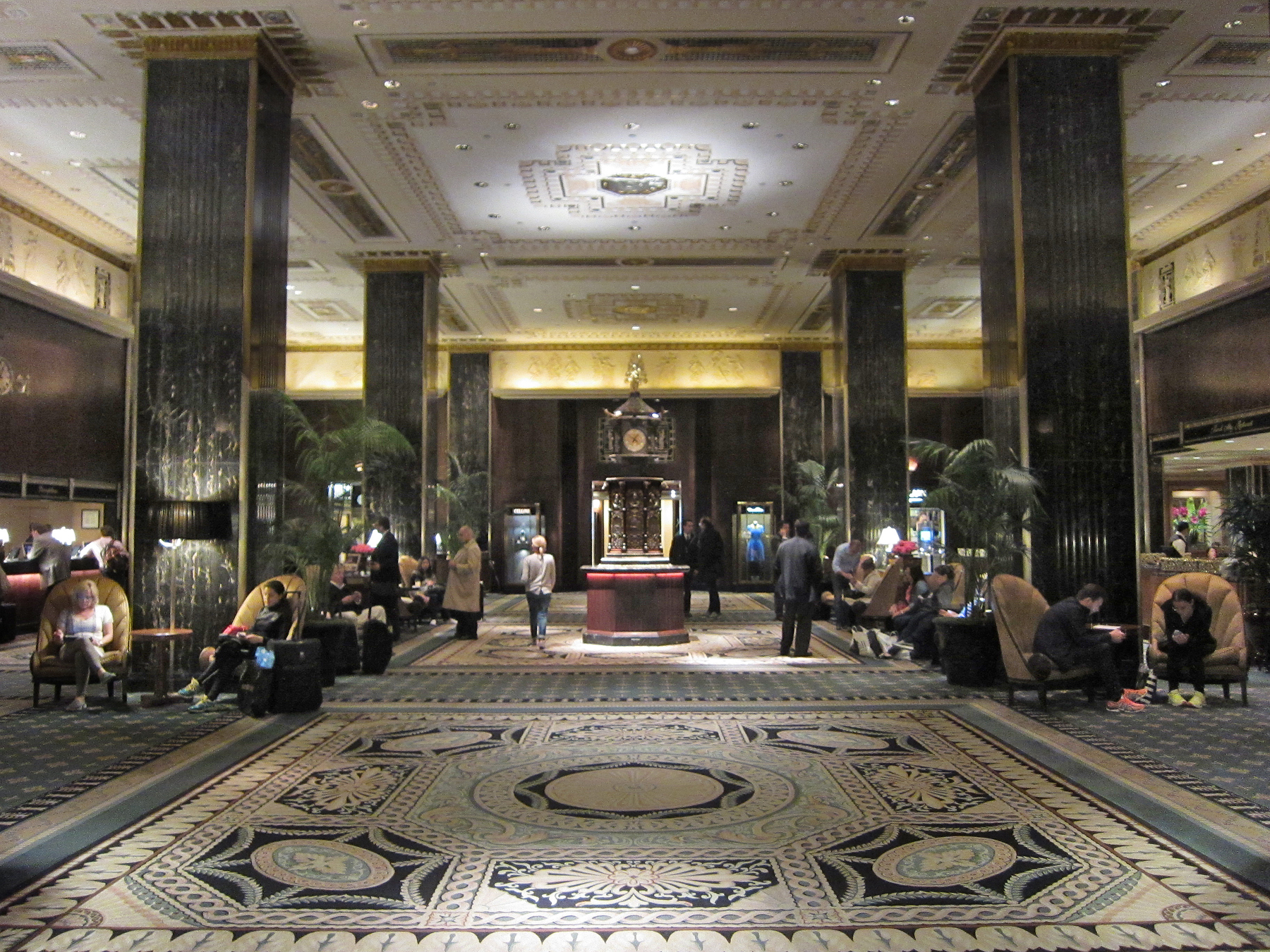
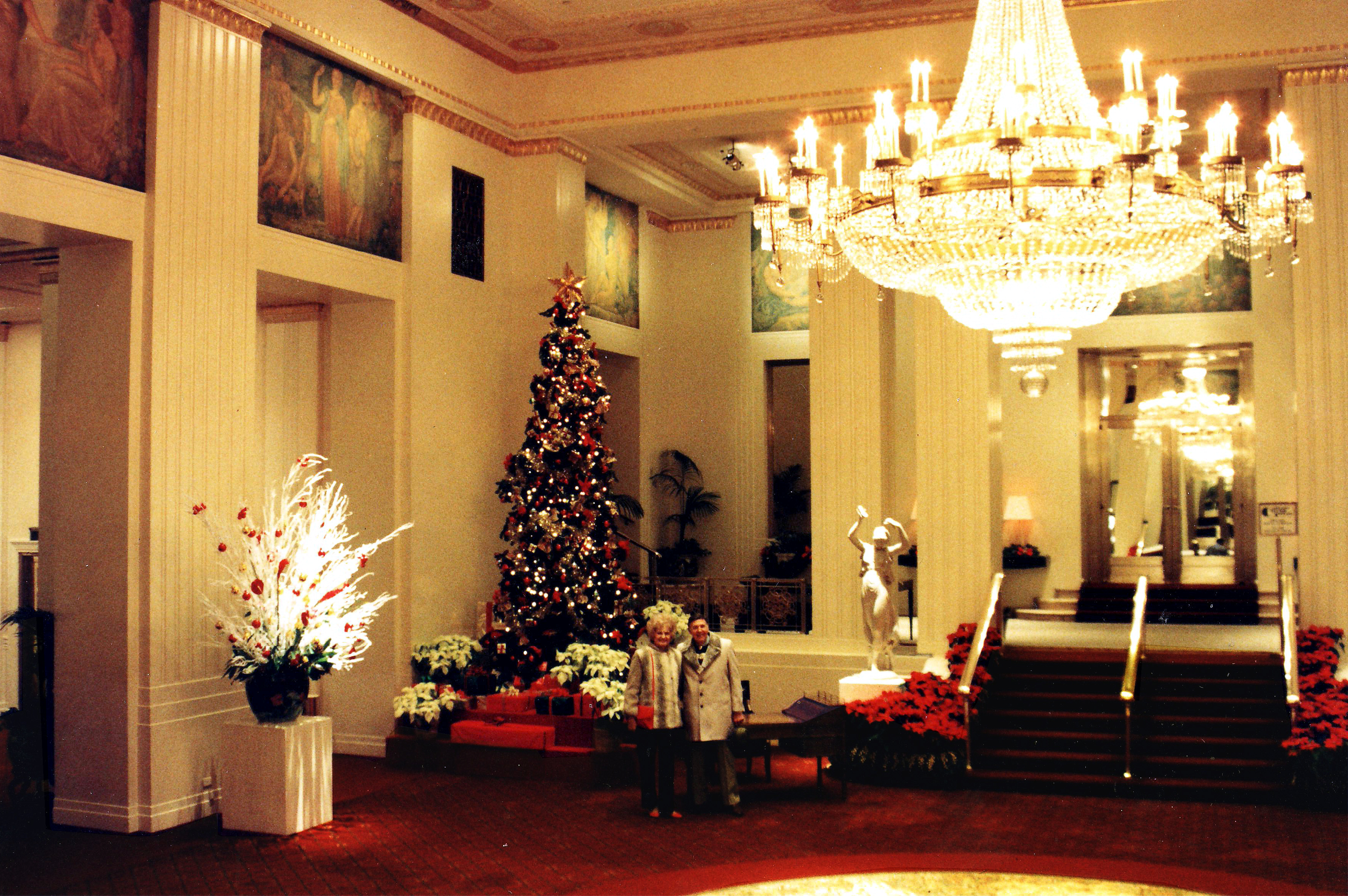
Above: The main lobby. Below: The foyer

The main lobby, at the center of the lobby level, measures 82 by 62 feet (25 by 19 m) across and 22 feet (6.7 m) high. The lobby has four wood-paneled walls, all of which originally contained archways, but the archways on the north and south walls have been infilled. There are also square columns made of black marble, which support a plaster ceiling. The tops of the walls contain a bas-relief frieze, installed in a 1980s renovation. The lobby is furnished with polished nickel-bronze cornices and Rockwood stone. In the main lobby is a chandelier measuring 10 feet (3.0 m) by 10 feet (3.0 m). Initially, the north wall of the lobby had a porter and cigar store; the east wall had a transportation desk; and the south wall had a cashier's desk and front-office desk. Special desks in the lobby are provided for transportation and theater, where exclusive tickets to many of the city's prominent theaters can be purchased.

The grand clock, a 4,000 lb (1,800 kg) bronze, was built by the Goldsmith's Company of London and was acquired from the 1893 World's Columbian Exposition. Its base is octagonal, with eight commemorative plaques of presidents George Washington, Abraham Lincoln, Ulysses S. Grant, Andrew Jackson, Benjamin Harrison, and Grover Cleveland, and Queen Victoria and Benjamin Franklin. A shield once belonging to the Waldorf was moved to the Alexis restaurant on W. Franklin Street in 1984. The lobby also contains Cole Porter's Steinway & Sons floral print-decorated grand piano on the Cocktail Terrace, which the hotel had once given him as a gift. Porter was a resident at the hotel for 30 years and composed many of his songs here.

The main lobby is surrounded on all four sides by a system of secondary corridors. The eastern corridor allowed direct access from Lexington Avenue to the various rooms on the third and fourth stories. The architects used different colors of marbles for the lobby-floor lounges to distinguish them from each other. The west lounge has French walnut burl panels separated by red French marble; the former north lounge had yellow Siena marble; the south lounge has white gray Breche Montalto marble; and the east arcade has serpentine cladding.

===== East arcade and stair hall =====
East of the main lobby is the main lobby hall, which leads to the hotel's east arcade and eastern elevator bank. The room includes wall panels made of burled wood, as well as bronze vitrines. The east arcade runs in a north–south direction, connecting the main lobby hall to the west and a stair hall to the east. Its design is similar to that of the west lounge. The east arcade has elevators with nickel-bronze doors that contain bas-reliefs of floral patterns and figures. The east arcade also contains Japanese-ash wall paneling; green-marble pilasters with Corinthian capitals; and metal-and-glass doors. The northern end of the east arcade has been divided into another room, while the southern end leads to a staircase that connects with the 49th Street Ballroom. The arcade also contains display cases and stores, although it originally functioned as a lounge.

The stair hall consists of a pair of staircases leading from the first to the third floor, allowing guests to access the ballroom directly from Lexington Avenue. The staircases contain balustrades with frozen-fountain motifs and brass handrails, as well as marble statues. The plaster walls are painted to resemble travertine and contain grilles and mirrored panels, while the ceilings have stepped surfaces and crystal chandeliers.

===== Other lobby-level spaces =====
The lobby level contains the room registration and cashier desks, the Empire Room and Hilton Room, the private Marco Polo Club, the Wedding Salon, Kenneth's Salon, the Peacock Alley lounge and restaurant, and Sir Harry's Bar. From 1992 to 2013, Kenneth, sometimes called the world's first celebrity hairdresser, famed for creating Jacqueline Kennedy's bouffant in 1961, moved his hairdressing and beauty salon to the Waldorf after a 1990 fire destroyed his shop on 19 East 54th Street. The Library Lounge, which has functioned as the check-in area since 2025, is accessed from a porte-cochère facing 49th Street.

Several boutiques surround the lobby. The Empire Room is where many of the musical and dance performances were put on, from Count Basie, to Victor Borge, Gordon MacRae, Liza Minnelli, George M. Cohan, and Lena Horne, the first black performer at the hotel.

==== Third and fourth floors ====
The third floor contains the Grand Ballroom, the ballroom foyer, entrance hall, the Basildon Room, the Jade Room, and the Astor Gallery. The eastern part of the third floor contains the Jade Room to the north and the Astor Gallery to the south, separated by a foyer. The stair hall from the first floor connects the Jade Room–Astor Gallery foyer to the east with the ballroom's entrance hall to the west. The ballroom's entrance hall extends north to the Basildon Room and connects with the ballroom's foyer to the southwest. West of the ballroom foyer is the ballroom itself, at the center of the third floor's south side.

===== Grand Ballroom =====
The Grand Ballroom, measuring 120 by 135 feet (37 by 41 m), measures 44 feet (13 m) high. The space could fit up to 4,000 people. Although the ballroom has had several decorative schemes over the years, since 1983 it has been painted in a champagne-colored palette with silver and gold accents. The center of the ballroom has no columns and is spanned by a 312-short-ton (283 t) girder, which supports the upper stories. The ballroom has a stage at its northern end, which could accommodate a full orchestra. The rest of the room is surrounded by two balconies, which are supported by full-height piers and contain indirect lighting fixtures. The balconies on the fourth floor project from the piers, while those on the fifth floor are designed as cantilevered boxes, which have rounded fronts. The ballroom has a coved ceiling that measures 44 feet (13 m) tall and steps up toward the center; it originally had indirect lighting panels, but a crystal chandelier and cove lighting have also been installed. SOM restored the ballroom to its original appearance during the 2020s.

The Grand Ballroom is surrounded by galleries that connect the main floor to the balconies. The galleries contain carpets on the floors, grilles on the walls, and metal staircases. The ballroom was originally served by 27 elevators which connected to the main entrances, a set of private entrances on 49th and 50th Streets, and the guestrooms.

Numerous organizations hold their annual dinners in the Grand Ballroom, including St. John's University President's Dinner and the Alfred E. Smith Memorial Foundation Dinner. The NASCAR Sprint Cup end-of-season awards banquet was held at the Waldorf-Astoria every year between 1981 and 2008;, mainly in the Grand Ballroom. Every October, the Paris Ball was held in the Grand Ballroom, before moving to the Americana (now the Sheraton Times Square). Bob Hope was a regular performer at the Ballroom, as was Guy Lombardo, who used to broadcast live on the radio there from the "Starlight Roof". Maurice Chevalier performed at the ballroom in 1965 in his last appearance. Louis Armstrong performed at the Waldorf for two weeks in March 1971 in his last performance. Since 1986, most Rock & Roll Hall of Fame induction ceremonies have been held in the Grand Ballroom.

===== Other third- and fourth-story spaces =====
The ballroom foyer, east of the ballroom, measures 87 by 40 feet (27 by 12 m) wide. There is an aisle to the east, separating the foyer from the ballroom entrance hall. The southern end of the aisle contains a staircase leading to a mezzanine and the fourth-floor balcony; the mezzanine and stairway have metal railings. The walls contain metal grilles, and the north and south walls also have marble piers. The north, west, and east walls have transoms with mirrors, while the south wall has marble paneling and mirrored doors. The ceilings are made of plaster, with crystal chandeliers hanging from a dome with plaster peacocks.

The ballroom's entrance hall, also known as the Silver Corridor or Silver Gallery, bears a resemblance to the original hotel's Peacock Alley, but is shorter and wider. It measures almost 200 feet (61 m) long and connects the ballroom's foyer to the west with the stairways from Lexington Avenue to the east. This room has a vaulted ceiling with crystal chandeliers suspended from it. The walls and doors have mirrored panels, and the space also has grilles, molded frames, and murals. The elevator doors are made of nickel-bronze and depict two women, one each with a lute and a harp. This room also has allegorical murals painted by Edward Emerson Simmons, which are surrounded by wood frames and were taken from the original hotel's Astor Gallery. They depict twelve female figures, which represent the seasons and months of the year.

The Basildon Room, measuring 48 by 37 feet (15 by 11 m), is at the north end of the ballroom's entrance hall. The space includes oil paintings and a fireplace mantel salvaged from Basildon Park, a 17th-century English manor designed by John Carr. The oil paintings, designed by Angelica Kauffmann, depict scenes from the poem Divine Comedy by Dante Alighieri. The mantel and walls are decorated in the neoclassical style; the room also originally contained a wooden floor and mirrored transoms and doors.

The Jade Room, occupying the northeast corner of the third story, measures 78 by 48 feet (24 by 15 m), with marble pilasters and columns dividing the space into aisles. The center of the Jade Room originally had a maple dance floor, while the eastern aisle overlooks Lexington Avenue. The Jade Room contains bas-reliefs on the walls, themed to dance and rhythm; decorations along the edges of the ceiling; and a pair of suspended chandeliers. There are closets at the corners of each aisle, as well as mirrors on the north and south walls.

The small eastern foyer, connecting the Jade Room with the Astor Gallery, contains grilles on the walls and ceilings, as well as doorways leading west to the stair hall. The Astor Gallery, at the third story's southeast corner, also measures 78 by 48 feet and is divided into three aisles, like the Jade Room. Most of the decorative features are similar to those in the Jade Room, but the south wall of the Astor Gallery also contains a fireplace. The Jade Room had green pilasters and gold window drapes. The Astor Gallery had silver-gray pilasters and rose drapes.

On the fourth story were ballrooms that accommodated between 160 and 2,100 guests. The fourth floor has the banquet and sales offices, and most of the suites were named after guests including Barron, Vanderbilt, Windsor, Conrad, Vertès, Louis XVI, and Cole Porter. The fourth floor was where the notorious Sunday-night card games were played. Before its 2021 renovation, the hotel had a model of one of the living rooms of apartment 31A, then the suite of former U.S. president Herbert Hoover. A living room from the suite is also recreated as a display at the Herbert Hoover Presidential Library and Museum in West Branch, Iowa.

==== Rooms and suites ====
The hotel originally had 2,253 guestrooms, including 500 deluxe rooms and 300 parlors. The rooms above the 28th story were largely intended for long-term residents. The Waldorf Astoria and Towers had 1,413 hotel rooms as of 2014. In 2009, when it had 1,416 rooms, the main hotel had 1,235 single and double rooms and 208 minisuites, of which 17 of which were "Astoria Level" rooms with deluxe amenities and complimentary access to the Astoria Lounge. The Waldorf Towers, from the 28th floor up to the 42nd, had 181 rooms, of which 115 were suites, with one to four bedrooms. As of the late 1990s, the hotel had a housekeeping staff of nearly 400, with 150 day maids and 24 night maids. By the 2020s, the building had 375 guestrooms and 372 residential condominiums.

===== Lower-story guestrooms =====
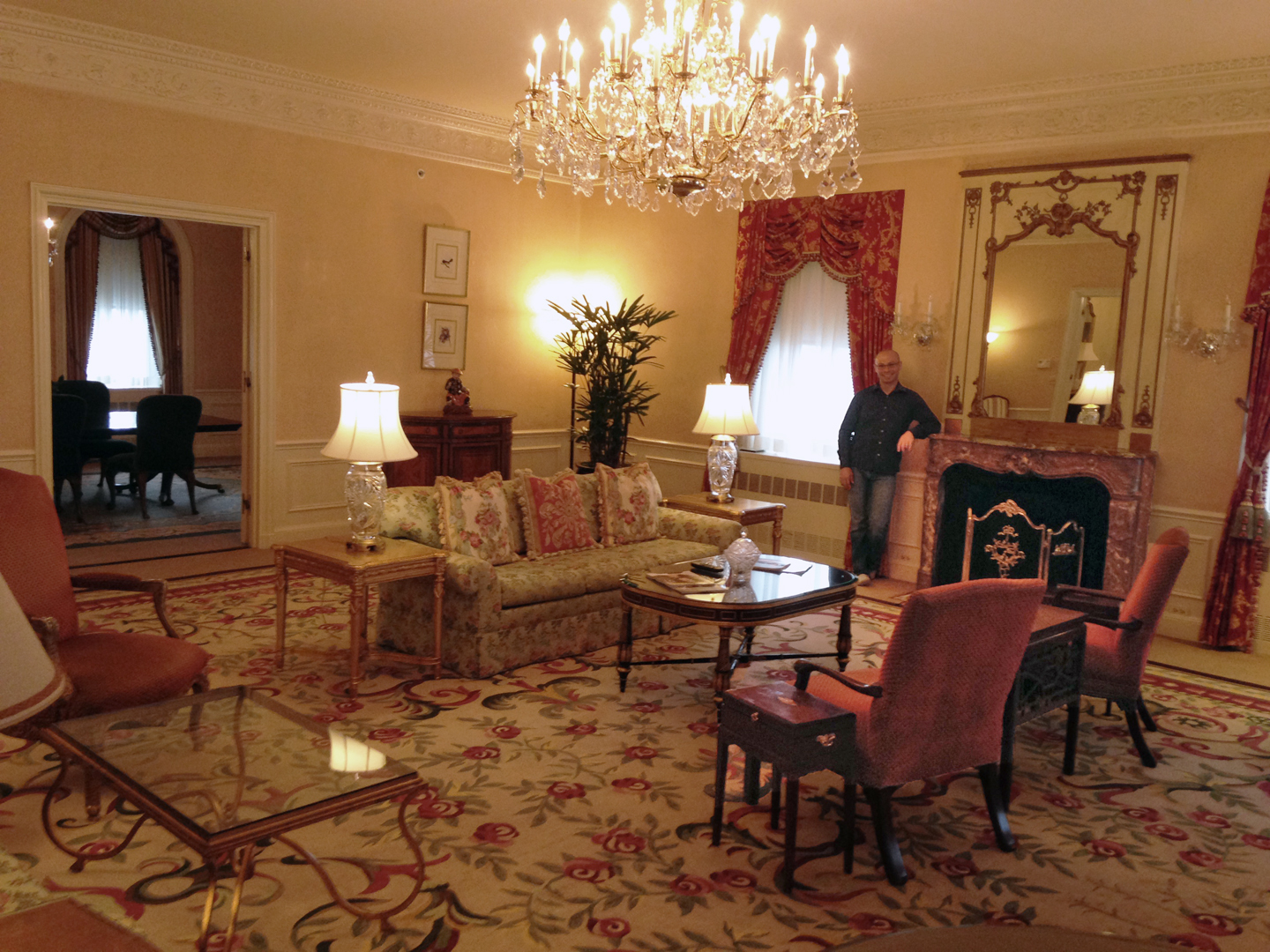
Waldorf Towers suite 30A

The hotel's guestrooms were originally decorated in 18th-century American, English, and French styles; Frommer's likened the décor of the rooms to those of an English country house. In the early 21st century, the guestrooms were classified as Deluxe, Superior, and Luxury, with a marble bath or shower and amenities designed by Salvatore Ferragamo. The suites ranged from 450 to 900 square feet (42 to 84 m^{2}). The rooms retained their original Art Deco motifs, although each room is decorated differently.

After Pierre-Yves Rochon's 2020s renovation, there are 11 types of hotel rooms and suites, each spanning at least 570 square feet (53 m^{2}). Many of the enlarged units are at least twice as large as the previous rooms, and they generally contain bar areas and dressing rooms. The redesigned rooms have mauve and mint color schemes, along with mosaics, marbles, and custom furniture. There are also dark wood finishes, and each room has a wardrobe that is accessible directly from the walkway. Rooms 1218–1220 are connected and can be configured as a single penthouse suite, the Waldorf Astoria Suite.

===== Upper-story suites and condominiums =====
The Tower suites were divided into standard ones; The Towers Luxury Series, which have their own sitting room; the Towers Penthouse Series; the Towers Presidential-Style Suites; and finally the most expensive Presidential Suite on the 35th floor. The Penthouse Series contained three suites, The Penthouse, The Cole Porter Suite, and The Royal Suite, named after the Duke and Duchess of Windsor. They started at 1,800 square feet (170 m^{2}) in size, with two or more bedrooms, and had a kitchen and a dining room which could accommodate 8–12 guests.

The Towers Presidential-Style Suites were divided into the MacArthur Suite and the Churchill Suite, and had their own grand entry foyer. Like the Penthouse Series, they had their own kitchen and dining room. The 2,250 square feet (209 m^{2}) Presidential Suite was designed with Georgian-style furniture to emulate that of the White House. It had three large bedrooms and three bathrooms, and boasted numerous treasures, including the desk of General MacArthur and rocking chair of John F. Kennedy.

As of 2024, the condominiums span floors 19 to 52 and range from studio apartments to penthouse apartments. Many of the units have private terraces. The upper stories largely have 28 condos on each floor. The 40th to 42nd stories contain a total of two penthouses. The penthouses, within the copper pinnacles, are duplex apartments covering 6,500 square feet (600 m^{2}) and have private elevators. In 2020, excluding the penthouses, the minimum asking prices for the condos ranged from $2.6 million for a one-bedroom unit, to $18.5 million for a four-bedroom, 3,000-square-foot (280 m^{2}) unit.

==== Other facilities ====
The 18th floor had a 260-foot-wide (79 m) roof garden and outdoor terrace, as well as a foyer, checking room, coatroom, and kitchens. The terrace contained multicolored glass mosaics inlaid in cement. A 2,500 square feet (230 m^{2}) fitness center is on the 5th floor. The $21.5 million Waldorf Astoria Guerlain Spa was inaugurated on September 1, 2008, on the 19th floor. It features 16 treatment rooms and two relaxation lounges. The hotel has its own Business Center, a 1,150 square feet (107 m^{2}) digital facility, where guests can access the Internet and photocopy.

In 2004, the hotel launched a line of products in keeping with its Art Deco design. The top five stories were devoted to mechanical equipment. Following the 2020s renovation, the hotel portion of the Waldorf Astoria had 100,000 square feet (9,300 m^{2}) of amenity spaces, while the condo portion had another 50,000 square feet (4,600 m^{2}) of amenities. These amenities included a kitchen, a library, an indoor garden, four bars, and a swimming pool, in addition to a spa covering 30,000 square feet (2,800 m^{2}) and an event space covering 43,000 square feet (4,000 m^{2}).

When the Waldorf Astoria opened, it had 31 elevators. The lower stories were served by nine elevators, while the Waldorf Towers were served by four elevators traveling at 700 feet per minute (210 m/min). There were also three elevators connecting the ground, ballroom, and banquet-room levels, each capable of carrying 6,000 pounds (2,700 kg), and an elevator on 50th Street connecting to the ballroom and exhibition levels, capable of carrying 8,000 pounds (3,600 kg).

The hotel has its own railway platform, Track 61, that was part of the New York Central Railroad (later Metro-North Railroad), and was connected to the Grand Central Terminal complex. Intended for guests with private railcars, the platform was used by such figures as Franklin D. Roosevelt, James Farley, Adlai Stevenson, and Douglas MacArthur, and it has also hosted exhibits and fashion shows. An elevator measuring 18 by 6 feet (5.5 by 1.8 m), large enough for Franklin D. Roosevelt's automobile, provides access to the platform. There is a pedestrian entrance from 50th Street, just to the left of the Waldorf Towers entrance, but it is rarely open to the public.

== Cuisine ==
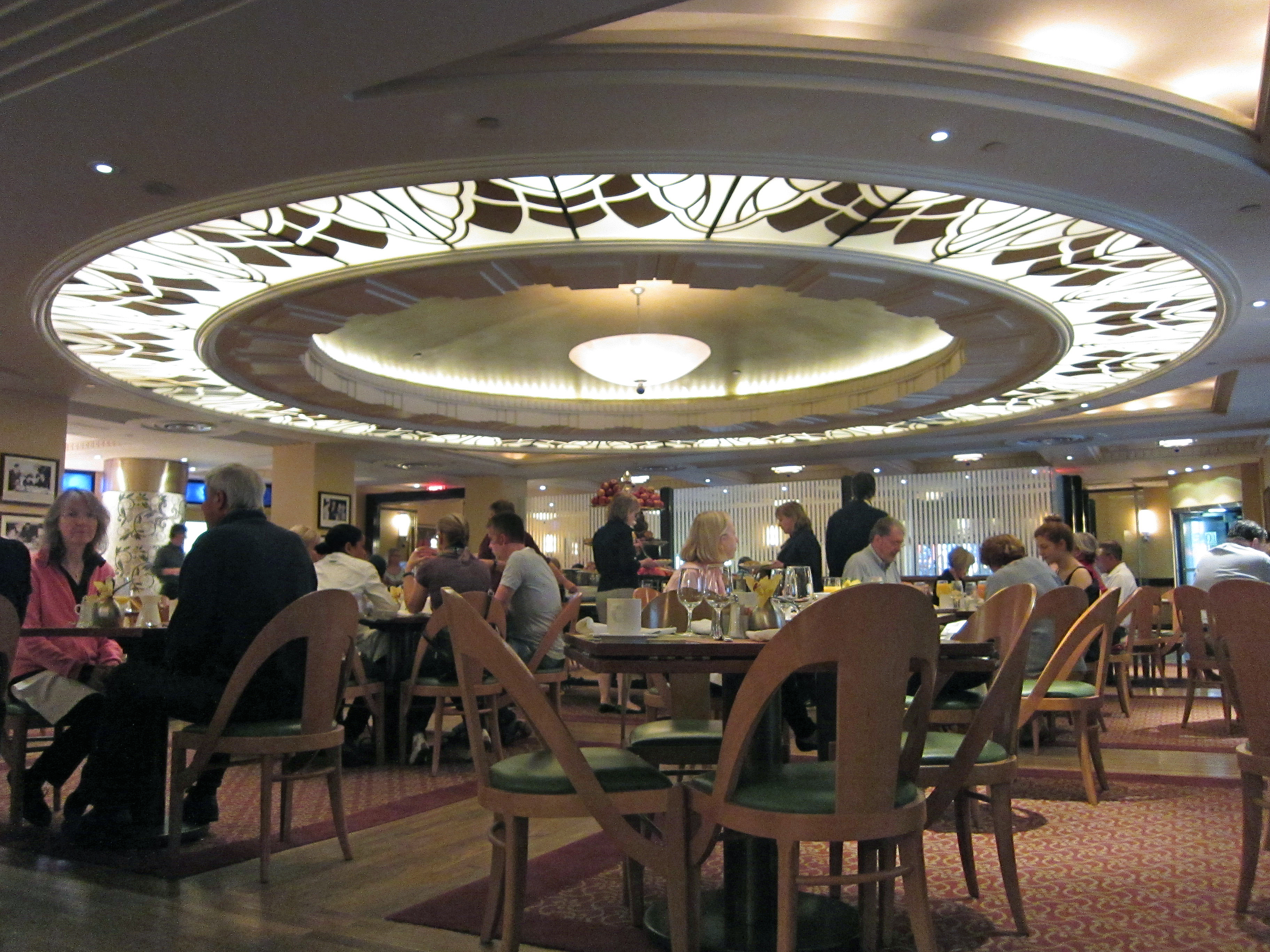
Breakfast at the Waldorf Astoria

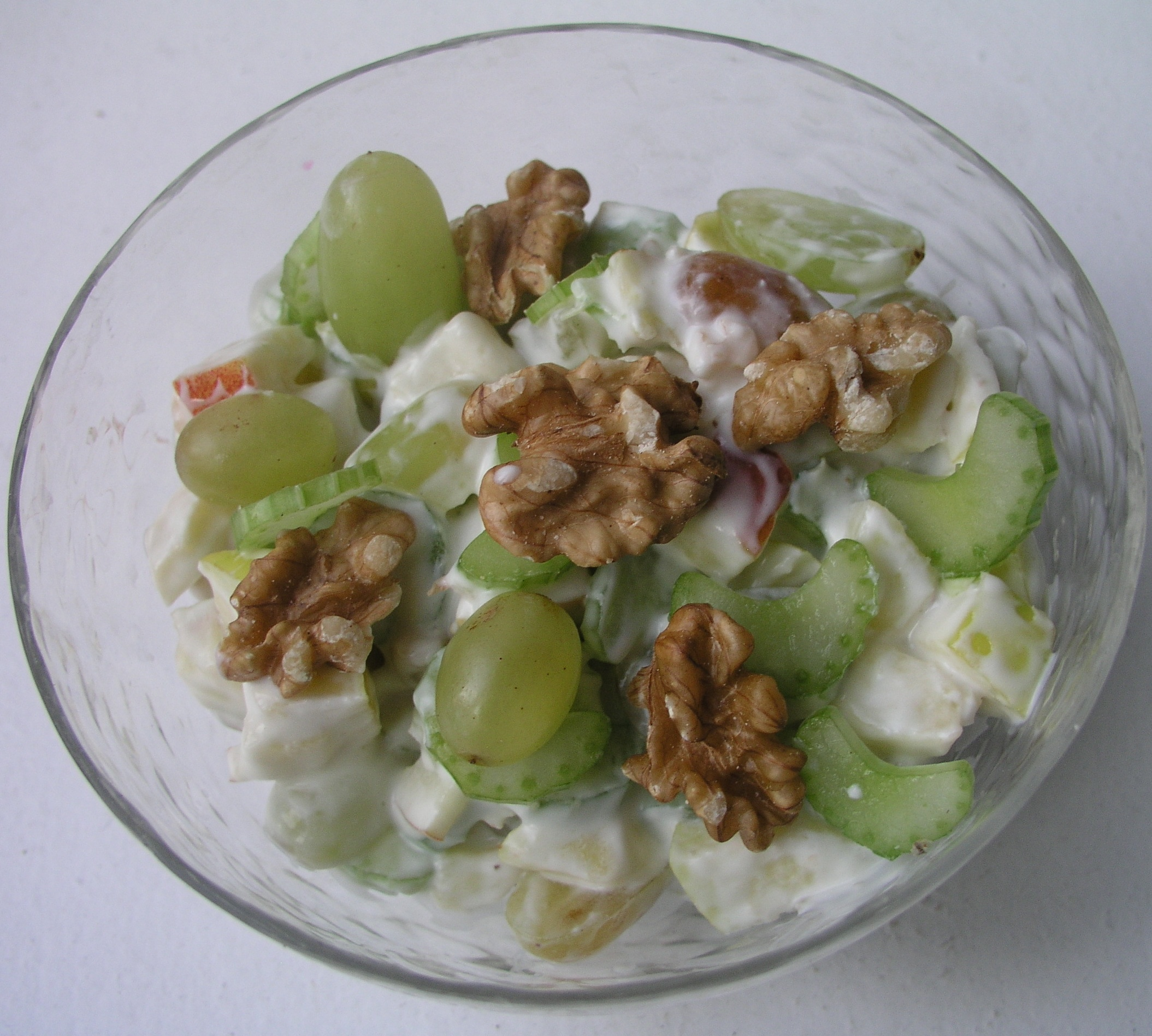
The classic Waldorf salad

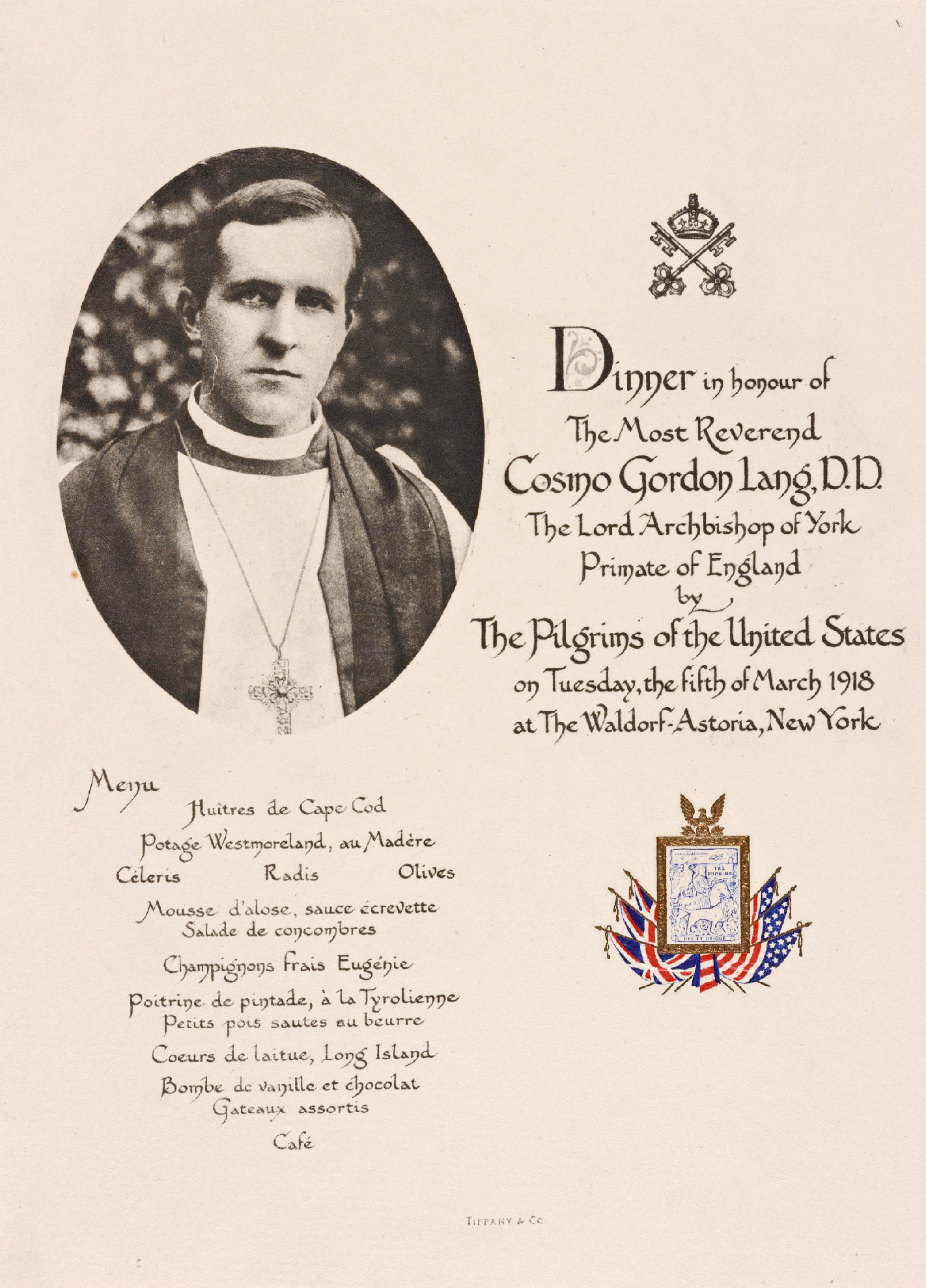
A 1918 menu for a dinner honoring Cosmo Gordon Lang, Archbishop of York

The Waldorf Astoria was the first hotel to offer room service 24 hours a day, and it was the first major hotel in the world to hire women as chefs, beginning in 1931. An extensive menu is available for guests, with special menus for children and for dieters. The executive chef of the Waldorf for many years was John Doherty, following the Austrian Arno Schmidt who held the position for ten years from 1969 to 1979. Restaurateur George Lang was awarded the Hotelman of the Year Award in 1975.

As of the early 1990s, the hotel served over three million dishes a year and got through 27,000 pounds (12,000 kg) of lobster, 100 pounds (45 kg) of beluga caviar, 380,000 US dry pints (210,000 L) of strawberries annually. The hotel has gained significant renown for its lavish feasts. During one grand feast for Francis Cardinal Spellman, over 200 VIP guests, according to Arno Schmidt, devoured some 3,600 pounds (1,600 kg) of fillet, 600 pounds (270 kg) of fresh halibut, 1,500 pounds (680 kg) of potatoes, and 260 pounds (120 kg) of petit fours, eaten on gold china plates. One 1973 feast by the Explorers Club devoured hippo meat, a 4-foot (1.2 m) alligator, a baby shark, an amberjack tuna, a boa, wild boar hams, 480 pieces of breaded-fried cod tongues and cheeks, antelope steaks, two boxes of Chinese rabbit, and 20 pounds (9 kg) of rattlesnake.

=== Bars and restaurants ===
==== Former restaurants ====
Prior to its 2020s renovation, the hotel had three main restaurants, Peacock Alley, The Bull and Bear Steak House, and Oscar's Brasserie, as well as a secondary restaurant, the Japanese Inagiku. At its peak in the late 1940s, the hotel once had nine restaurants.

The Bull and Bear Steak House was furnished in richly polished mahogany in the English Regency style, with a "den-like" atmosphere. It won awards from the National Restaurant Association and Holiday magazine. Between 2007 and 2010, the restaurant was the filming location for Fox Business Happy Hour, presented live between 5 and 6 pm. The Bull and Bear Bar was based on the original Waldorf Astoria Bar, which was a favorite haunt of many of the financial elite of the city from the hotel's inception in 1893, and adventurers such as Diamond Jim Brady, Buffalo Bill Cody and Bat Masterson. Behind the bar were bronze statues of a bull and a bear, which represent respectively growing and declining stock exchange trends.

The Inagiku, meaning the "rice chrysanthemum", served contemporary Japanese cuisine. Designed by Henry Look of San Francisco, the restaurant had four "distinctly different" rooms, including one which represents an old Japanese farmhouse, and the Kinagu Room, resembling a Japanese temple. Guests could reserve private orthodox tatami rooms.

Oscar's Brasserie, overlooking Lexington Avenue in what was once a Savarin restaurant, was designed by Adam Tihany. The restaurant tooks its name from Oscar Tschirky (Oscar of the Waldorf) and served traditional American cuisine, with many dishes based upon his cookbook, including the Waldorf salad, Eggs Benedict, Thousand Island dressing, and Veal Oscar. The Waldorf salad—a salad made with apples, walnuts, celery, grapes, and mayonnaise or a mayonnaise-based dressing—was first created in 1896 at the old Waldorf. Tschirky was also noted for his "Oscar's Sauce", which became so popular that it was sold at the hotel. Another of the hotel's specialties was red velvet cake, which became one of its most popular desserts.

Sir Harry's Bar was one of the principal bars of the hotel, situated just off the main lobby. It was named after British Sir Harry Johnston (1858–1927). In the 1970s the bar was renovated in a "plush African safari" design to honor Johnston, a notable explorer of Africa, with "zebra-striped wall coverings and carpeting, with bent-cane furnishings". It was later redecorated back to a more conservative design, with walnut paneling and leather banquettes, and featured a 23 feet (7.0 m) by 8 feet (2.4 m) ebony bar as of the early 1990s. Frank Sinatra frequented Sir Harry's Bar for many years.

==== Current restaurants ====
Following the 2020s renovation, the hotel has had three restaurants: the Lex Yard, Yoshoku, and Peacock Alley. The Lex Yard restaurant, named for the train yards below the hotel, was added as part of the hotel's 2020s renovation. The restaurant occupies two floors, with two private dining rooms on each level and an Art Deco bar on each level. The restaurant itself serves Brasserie-style cuisine for breakfast, lunch, and dinner, and it has separate prix fixe and à la carte menus. Two types of Waldorf salad are served at the Lex.

Yoshoku, occupying a minimalist space in the Park Avenue lobby, adjoins Rigal's mosaic. It serves à la carte Japanese food such as sashimi and sushi rolls. Its other food options range from small dishes, such as salad and snap pea, to larger dishes, such as wagyu striploin.

Peacock Alley, in the west lounge, is the only restaurant in the hotel that survived the 2020s renovation. Originally, was known primarily for its fish and seafood dishes. Sunday Brunch was particularly popular with locals and featured over 180 gourmet dishes divided into 12 themed displays, with cuisine ranging from lobster and oysters to Belgian waffles, Eggs Benedict, and omelettes to hollandaise sauces. By 2025, Peacock Alley had become a full-service venue with a cocktail bar.

=== Cocktail books ===
Albert Stevens Crockett, the hotel's veteran publicist and historian, wrote his first cocktail book "Old Waldorf Bar Days" in 1931 during Prohibition and the construction of the current hotel on Park Avenue. It was a homage to the original hotel and its famous bar and clientele. The book contains Crockett's takes on the original hand-written leather-bound book of recipes that was given to him at the time of the closure by bartender Joseph Taylor. This edition was never reprinted.

In 1934, Crockett wrote a second book, "The Old Waldorf Astoria Bar Book", in response to the repeal of the Volstead Act and the end of the Prohibition era. He edited out most of the text from the first book. Drawing from his experiences as a travel writer, Crockett added nearly 150 more recipes, the bulk of which can be found in the "Cuban Concoctions" and "Jamaican Jollifers" chapters. These books became reference books on the subject of pre-Prohibition cocktails and their culture.

In 2016, the long-time hotel bar manager of Peacock Alley and La Chine, Frank Caiafa, added a completely new edition to the canon. Caiafa's "The Waldorf Astoria Bar Book" includes all of the recipes in Crockett's books; many of the hotel's most important recipes created since 1935; and his own creations. In 2017, it was nominated for a James Beard Foundation Award for Best Beverage Book.

Other notable books with connections to the hotel include "Drinks" (1914) by Jacques Straub, a wine steward and a friend of Oscar Tschirky who had written about the first hotel's notable recipes. Tschirky compiled a list of 100 recipes for his own 1934 book "100 Famous Cocktails", a selection of favorites from Crockett's books. Hotel publicist Ted Saucier wrote "Bottoms Up" in 1951, consisting of a compendium of popular, national recipes of the day.

== Notable residents and guests ==
=== Leaders and businesspeople ===
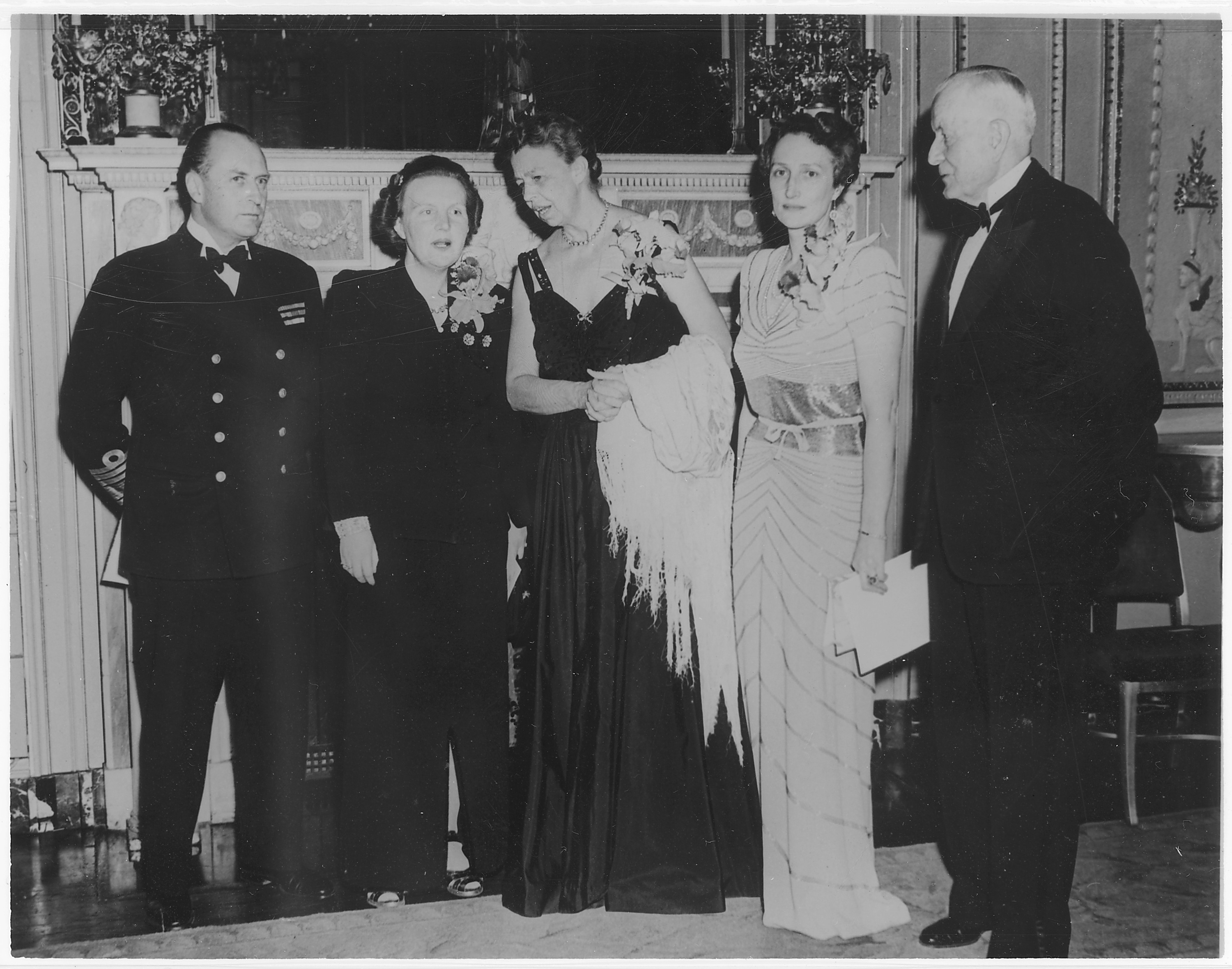
Crown Prince Olav of Norway, Princess Juliana of the Netherlands, Eleanor Roosevelt, Crown Princess Märtha of Norway, and Thomas J. Watson at the Waldorf Astoria in 1944

On the 100th anniversary of the original hotel in 1993, one publication wrote: "It isn't the biggest hotel in New York, nor the most expensive. But when it comes to prestige, the Waldorf-Astoria has no peer. When presidents come to New York, they stay at the Waldorf-Astoria. Kings and queens make it their home away from home, as have people as diverse as Cary Grant, the Dalai Lama and Chris Evert. Some of them liked the hotel so well, they made their home there."

Over the years many royals from around the world stayed at the Waldorf Astoria including Mohammad Reza Pahlavi, Shah of Iran and Empress Farah, King Frederik IX and Queen Ingrid of Denmark, Princess Astrid of Norway, Crown Prince Olav and Crown Princess Martha of Norway, King Baudouin I of Belgium and Queen Fabiola, Prince Albert and Princess Paola of Belgium, King Hussein I of Jordan, Prince Rainier III and Princess Grace of Monaco, Queen Juliana of the Netherlands, King Michael of Romania, Queen Elizabeth II and Prince Philip of the Commonwealth realms, Mohammed Zahir Shah and Homaira Shah of Afghanistan, King Bhumibol Adulyadej and Queen Sirikit of Thailand, and Crown Prince Akihito and Princess Michiko of Japan, The great-great-grandson of King Joseph Bonaparte and many others.

Queen Elizabeth II and Prince Philip stayed at the hotel during their first visit to America on October 21, 1957, and a banquet was held for them in the Grand Ballroom. In the Bicentennial year in 1976, most of the heads of state from around the world and all of the Kings and Queens of Europe were invited to the hotel, and it also served the presidential candidates in the run up to the elections of that year.

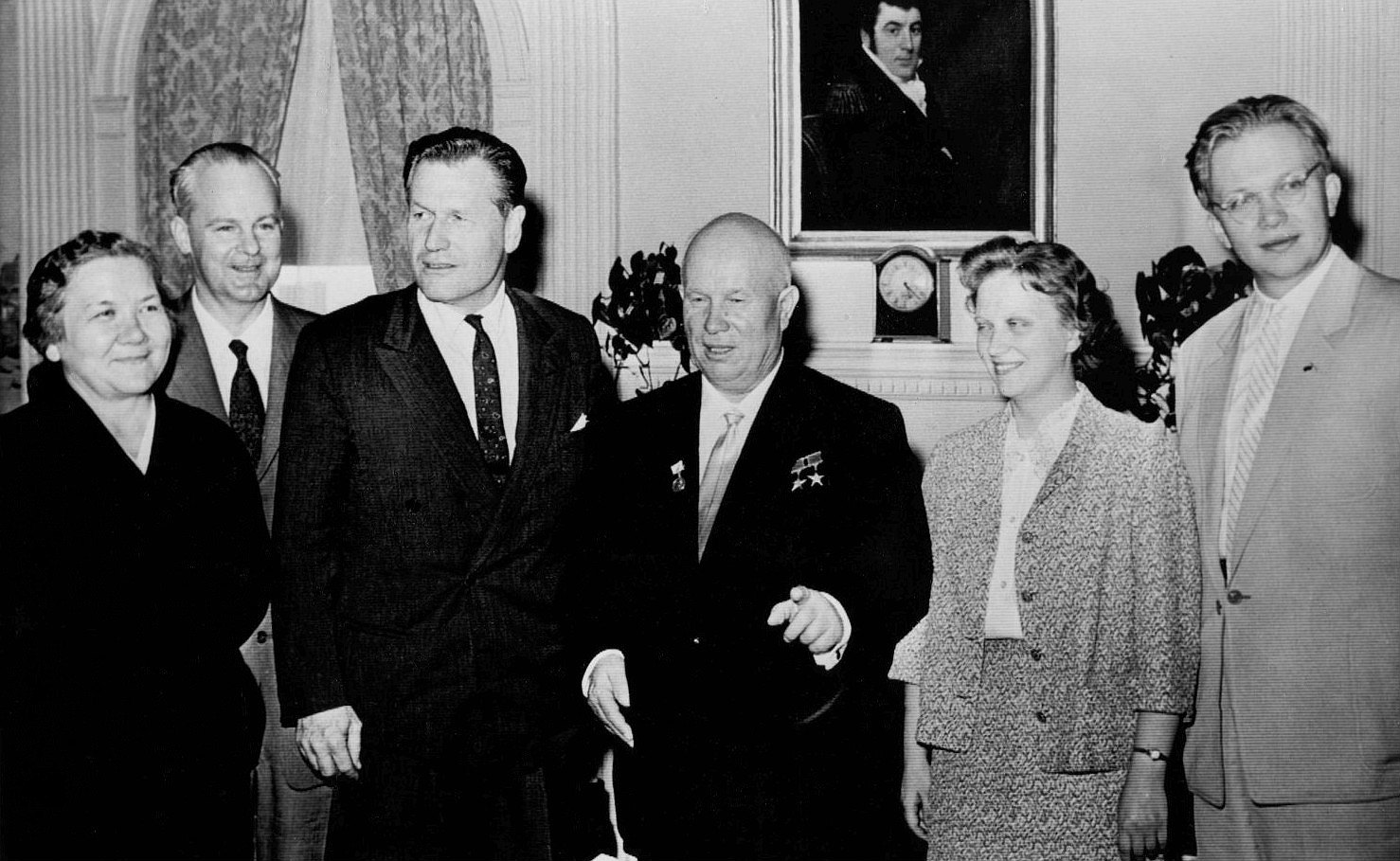
The Khrushchev family with New York Governor Nelson Rockefeller at the Waldorf Astoria in 1959

In modern times, the clientele of the Waldorf is more typically wealthy politicians and businessmen than playboys and royalty. An entire floor was often rented out to wealthy Saudi Arabians with their own staff. Wealthy Japanese businessmen during their stay would sometimes remove the furniture and replace it with their own floor mats. Demands by people of prominence could often be exorbitant or bizarre. Fidel Castro once walked into the hotel with a flock of live chickens, insisting that they be killed and freshly cooked on the premises to his satisfaction, only to be turned away. While serving as Secretary of State, Henry Kissinger ordered all of the antiques to be removed from one suite and replaced with 36 desks for his staff. An unnamed first lady once demanded that all of the bulbs in her suite be changed to 100-watt ones and kept on all day and night to simulate daylight. She further insisted that there be an abundance of chewing gum available.

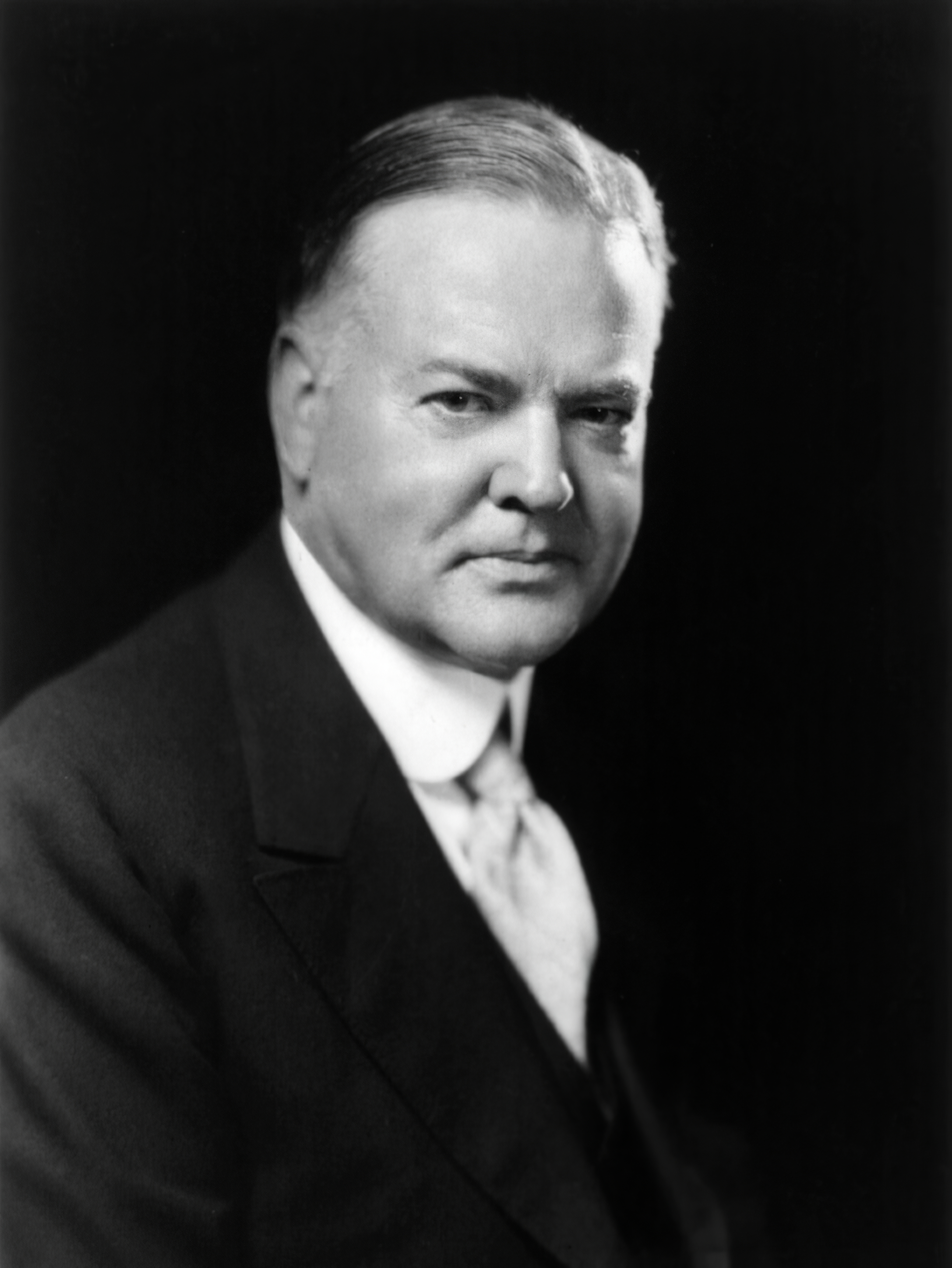
Herbert Hoover lived at the Waldorf for 20 years, from 1944 until he died in 1964 while living in the hotel's Presidential Suite.

Postmaster General James Farley occupied two adjoining suites in the current Waldorf Astoria during his tenure as the chairman of the board of Coca-Cola's International division from 1940 until his death in 1976, arguably one of the landmark's longest housed tenants. The Presidential Suite at the hotel come from when, during the 1950s and early 1960s, former U.S. president Herbert Hoover and retired U.S. General Douglas MacArthur lived in suites on different floors of the hotel. Hoover lived at the Waldorf Astoria for 20 years from after his wife died in 1944 until he died in 1964. Former president Dwight D. Eisenhower lived there between 1967 and his death in 1969.

MacArthur's widow, Jean MacArthur, lived there from 1952 until her death in 2000. A plaque affixed to the wall on the 50th Street side commemorates this. John F. Kennedy was fond of the Waldorf Astoria and had a number of private meetings at the hotel, including one with Israeli prime minister David Ben-Gurion. From Hoover through Barack Obama, every president of the United States has either stayed over or lived in the Waldorf Astoria, although Jimmy Carter claimed to have never stayed overnight at the hotel. Nancy Reagan was reputedly not fond of the Presidential Suite.

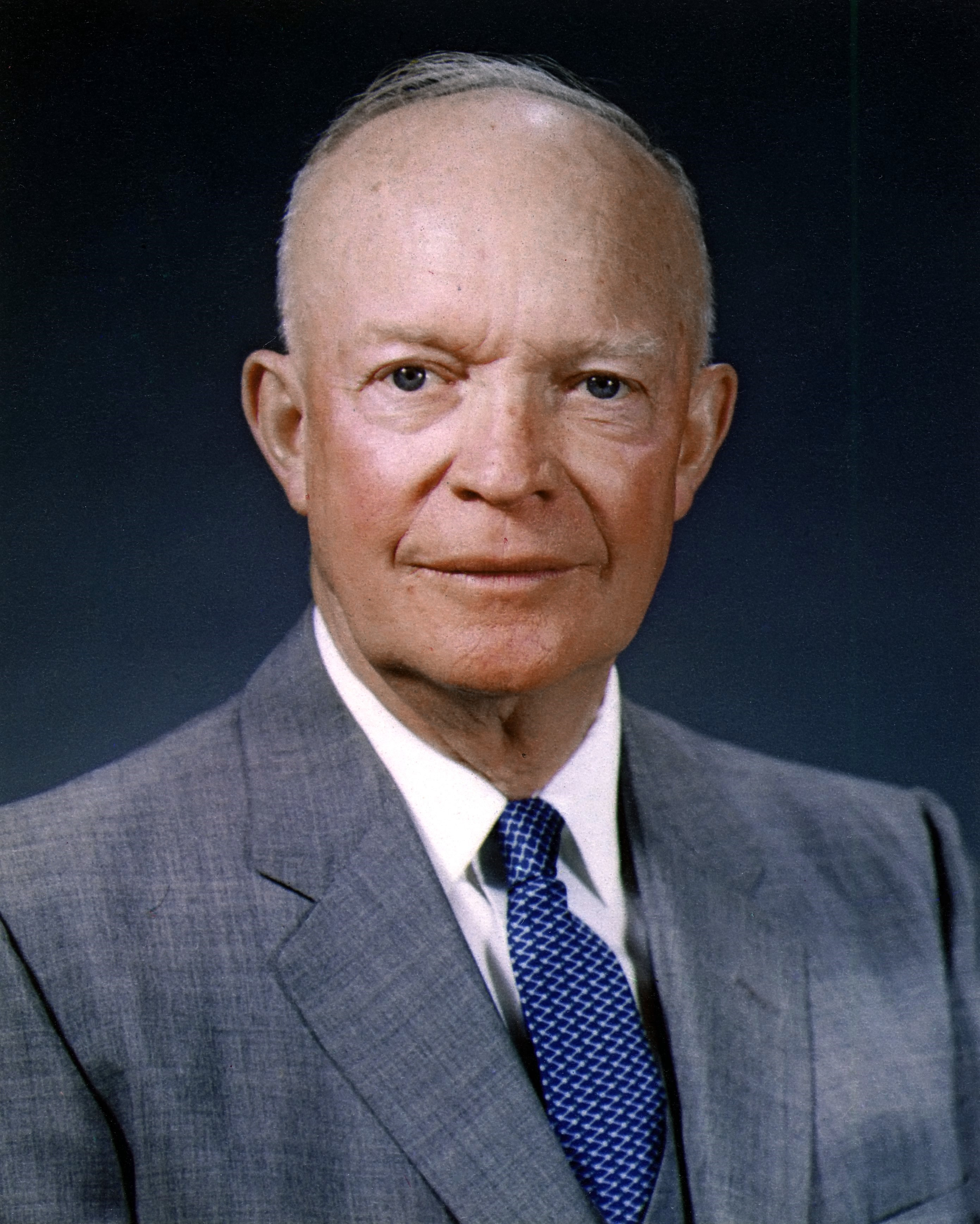
Former US president Dwight D. Eisenhower maintained a residence at the hotel until his death in 1969.

The official residence of the United States' Permanent Representative to the United Nations, an unnamed 42nd-floor apartment, was located in the Waldorf Towers for many years. In 2015, the US Department of State announced that it was moving its headquarters during meetings of the UN General Assembly to the New York Palace Hotel.

Carlos P. Romulo, Minister of Foreign Affairs of the Philippines and member of the UN had suite 3600, below Hoover's, for some 45 years from 1935 onwards. Former Philippine First Lady Imelda Marcos also spent much time and money at the hotel. Another connection with the Philippines is that many meetings were held here between President Manuel L. Quezon and high ranking American politicians and senators. Through the meetings, Quezon encouraged investment into the country and convinced General MacArthur to accompany him back to the Philippines as his military adviser.

Nicaraguan president Anastasio Somoza Debayle and his wife Hope Portocarrero had a penthouse suite at the Waldorf Towers, where Somoza received political leaders.

=== Celebrities ===
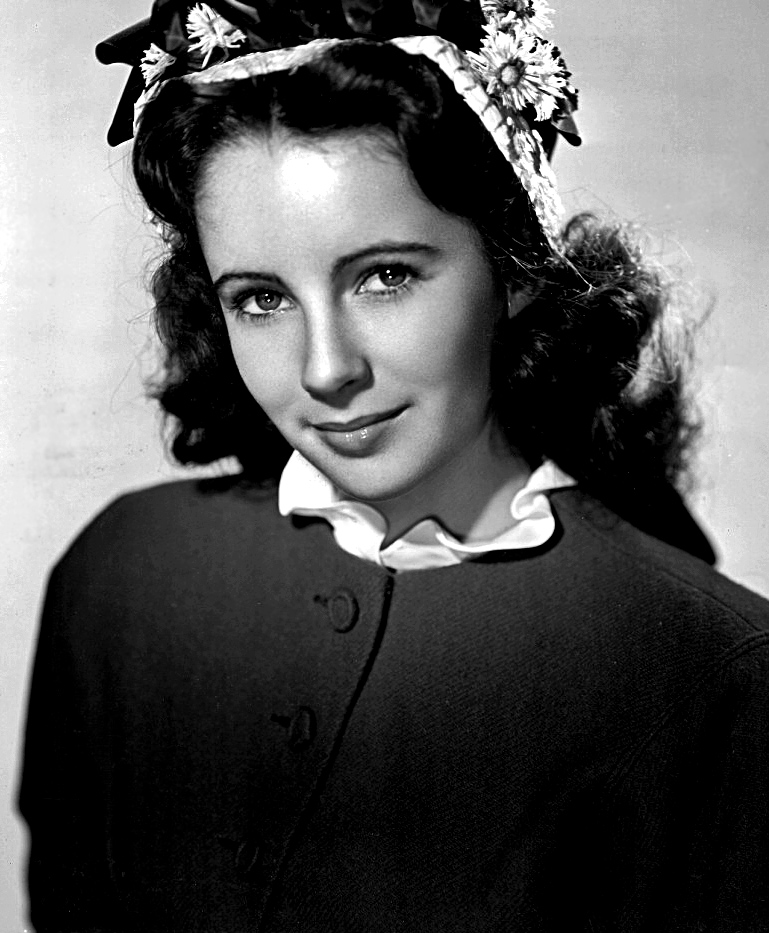
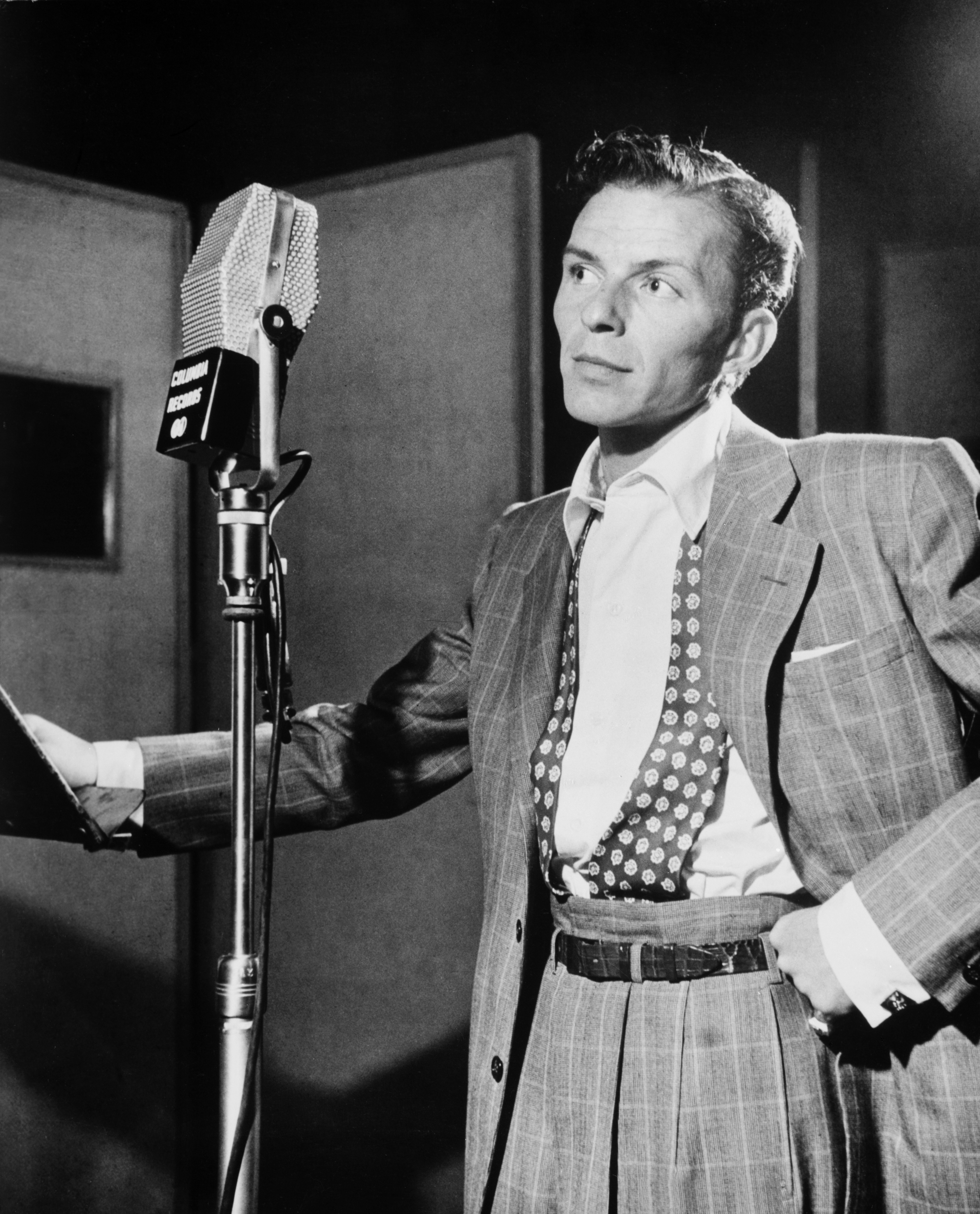
Elizabeth Taylor and Frank Sinatra

The hotel has had many well-knowns under its roof throughout its history, including Charlie Chaplin, Ava Gardner, Liv Ullmann, Edward G. Robinson, Gregory Peck, Ray Bolger, John Wayne, Tony Bennett, Jack Benny, Katharine Hepburn, Spencer Tracy, Muhammad Ali, Vince Lombardi, Judy Garland, Sonny Werblin, Greer Garson, Harold Lloyd, Liberace, Burt Reynolds, Robert Montgomery, Cesar Romero, and many others. Due to the number of high-profile guests staying at the hotel at any one time, author Ward Morehouse III has referred to the Towers as a "kind of vertical Beverly Hills. On any one given night you might find Dinah Shore, Gregory Peck, Frank Sinatra [or] Zsa Zsa Gabor staying there". Gabor married Conrad Hilton in 1941.

During the 1930s, gangster Benjamin "Bugsy" Siegel owned an apartment at the Waldorf. Frank Costello was said to have got his haircut and nails done in the Barber's Shop at the Waldorf. Around the time of World War I, inventor Nikola Tesla lived in the earlier Waldorf-Astoria. Eunice Kennedy and Sargent Shriver's wedding reception was hosted at the Waldorf in 1953.

In 1955, Marilyn Monroe and her husband Arthur Miller stayed at the hotel for several months. Due to costs of trying to finance her production company "Marilyn Monroe Productions", only being paid $1,500 a week for her role in The Seven Year Itch and being suspended from 20th Century Fox for walking out on Fox after creative differences, living at the hotel became too costly, and Monroe had to move into a different hotel in New York City.

Around the same time that Monroe lived in the hotel, Cole Porter and his wife Linda Lee Thomas had an apartment in the Waldorf Towers, where Thomas died in 1954. Porter's 1934 song "You're the Top", contains the lyric, "You're the top, you're a Waldorf salad". The Cole Porter Suite, Suite 33A, was the place where Porter lived and entertained for a period. Frank Sinatra paid nearly $1 million a year to keep it as his suite at the hotel between 1979 and 1988, which he called home when out of Los Angeles. Sinatra took over part of the hotel during the filming of The First Deadly Sin in 1980.

Grace Kelly and Rainier III were regular guests at the hotel. At one time Kelly was reputed to be in love with the hotel banquet manager of the Waldorf, Claudius Charles Philippe. Elizabeth Taylor frequented the hotel, and would often attend galas at the hotel to talk about her various causes. Her visits were excitedly awaited by the hotel staff, who would prepare long in advance. Taylor was honored at the 1983 Friars Club dinner at the hotel.

Brooke Shields has stated that her very first encounter with the paparazzi was in the Grand Ballroom of the Waldorf at the age of 12, stating that she "stood like a statue wondering why they were all hired to photograph me", and that she "debuted at the Waldorf". During her childhood in the 1980s and 1990s, Paris Hilton lived with her family in the hotel.

One of the most prestigious debutante balls in the world is the invitation-only International Debutante Ball held biennially in the Grand Ballroom at the Waldorf Astoria Hotel, where girls from prominent world families are presented to high society. (Note: These include aristocrats Princess Katarina of Yugoslavia, Vanessa von Bismarck (great-great-granddaughter of Otto von Bismarck), Princess Natalya Elisabeth Davidovna Obolensky (granddaughter of the Prince Ivan Obolensky, the chairman of the International Debutante Ball), Princess Ines de Bourbon Parme, Countess Magdalena Habsburg-Lothringen (great-great-granddaughter of Empress Elisabeth 'Sisi' of Austria) and Lady Henrietta Seymour (daughter of the Duke and Duchess of Somerset and descendant of Henry VIII's wife Jane Seymour).) (Note: Untitled elites include Tricia Nixon, Julie Nixon, Jennie Eisenhower, Ashley Walker Bush (granddaughter of President George H. W. Bush and niece of President George W. Bush), Lucinda Robb (granddaughter of President Lyndon B. Johnson), Christine Colby (daughter of Central Intelligence Agency (CIA) director William Colby), Hollister Knowlton (future wife of CIA director David Petraeus), Charlotte and Catherine Forbes (granddaughters of Malcolm Forbes) and Christina Huffington (daughter of Arianna Huffington of the Huffington Post) have all been invited to the ball. Ivanka Trump (daughter of President Donald Trump) and Sasha and Malia Obama (daughters of President Barack Obama) have also been invited to be presented as debutantes at the International Debutante Ball.) Since 1954 the musical entertainment at the ball has traditionally been provided by the musicians of the Lester Lanin Orchestra.

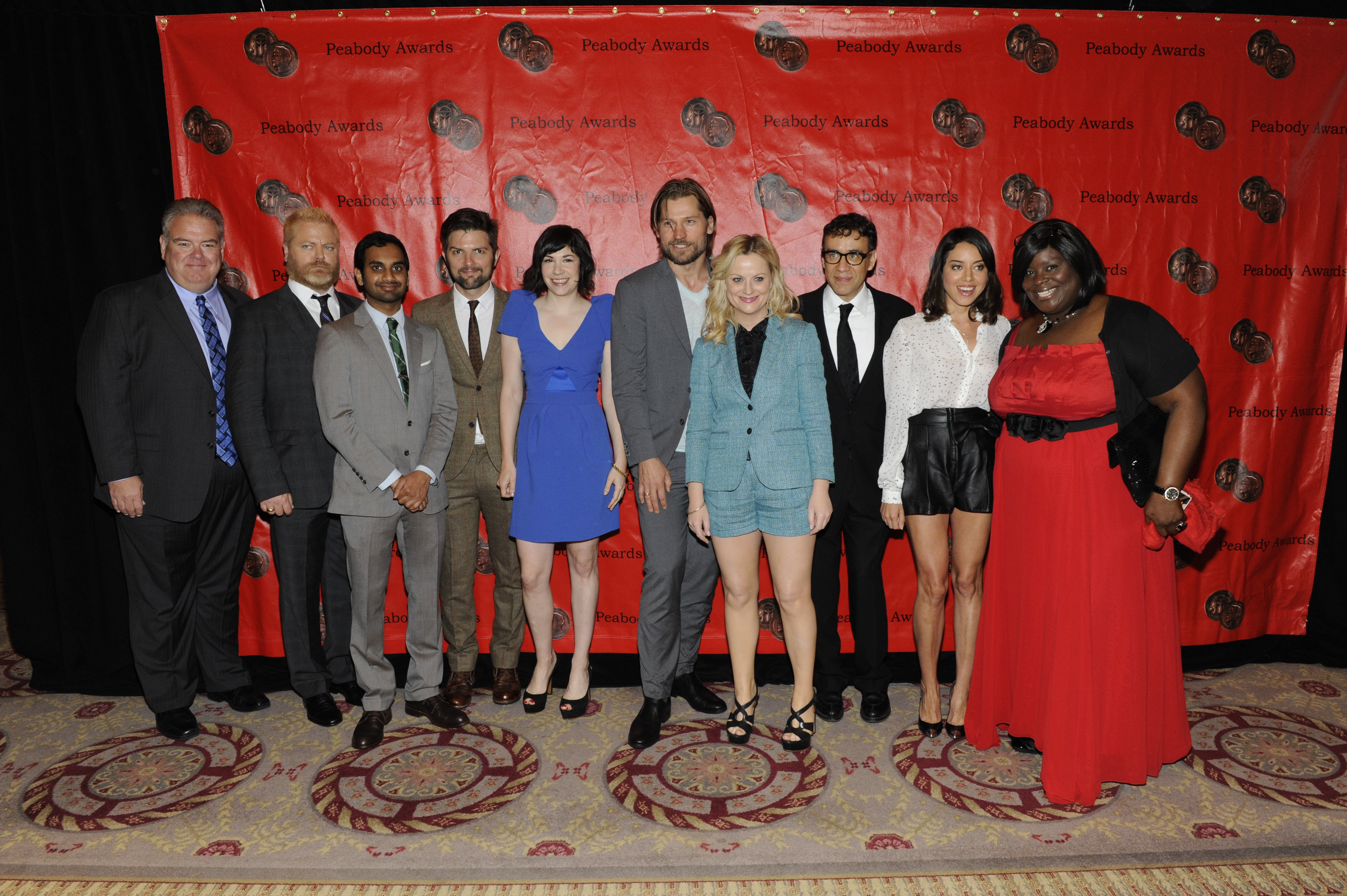
The casts of Parks and Recreation, Portlandia, and Game of Thrones at the 71st Annual Peabody Awards inside the Waldorf Astoria

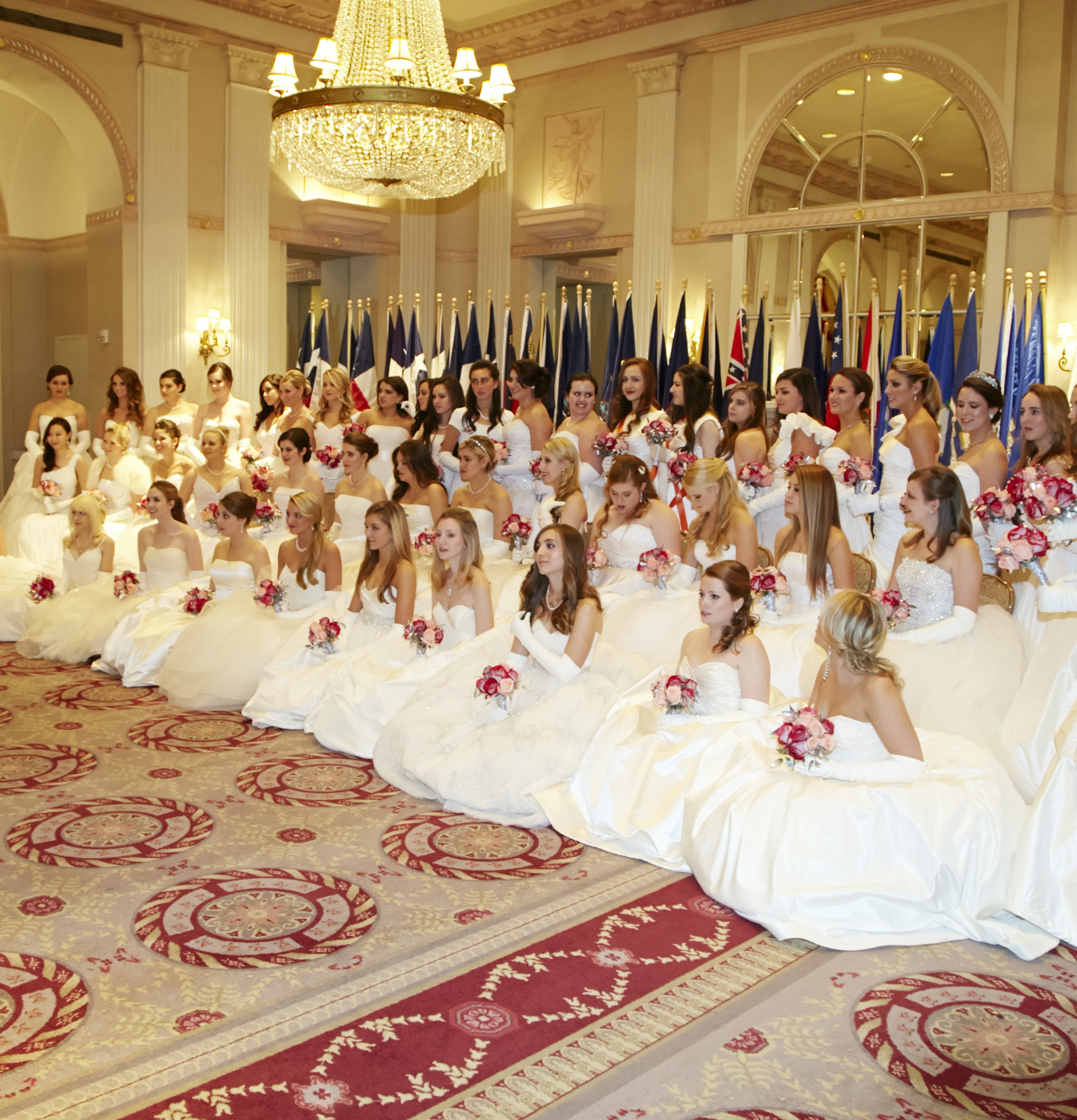
The 58th International Debutante Ball, 2012, at the Waldorf Astoria

== In popular culture ==
The Waldorf Astoria has been a filming location for numerous films and TV series. Ginger Rogers headlined an all star ensemble cast in the 1945 film Week-End at the Waldorf, set at the hotel and filmed partially on location there. Other films shot at the hotel include The Out-of-Towners (1970), Broadway Danny Rose (1984), Coming to America (1988), Scent of a Woman (1992), The Cowboy Way (1994), Random Hearts (1999), Analyze This (1999), For Love of the Game (1999), Serendipity (2001), The Royal Tenenbaums (2001), Maid in Manhattan (2002), Two Weeks Notice (2002), Catch Me If You Can (2002), End of the Century (2005), Mr. and Mrs. Smith (2005), The Pink Panther (2006), and The Hoax (2006). Television series that have filmed at the Waldorf include Law and Order, Rescue Me, Sex and the City, The Sopranos and Will and Grace.

Several biographies have been written about the Waldorf, including Edward Hungerford's Story of the Waldorf (New York: G. P. Putnam's Sons, 1925) and Horace Sutton's Confessions of a Grand Hotel: The Waldorf-Astoria (New York: Henry Holt, 1953). Langston Hughes wrote a poem entitled "Advertisement for the Waldorf-Astoria", criticizing the hotel and inviting the jobless and homeless to take over the space of the hotel. Wallace Stevens wrote a poem entitled "Arrival at the Waldorf", in which he contrasts the wild country of the jungles of Guatemala to being "back at the Waldorf". In Meg Cabot's novel Jinx, the Chapman School Spring Formal takes place in the Waldorf-Astoria. It is at this point that Tory (the main antagonist) reveals Jean's first attempt at a love spell, which catalyzed the novel's events.

Waldorf of the Muppets series was named after the hotel. In the episode starring Dizzy Gillespie, his heckling partner Statler (named after Statler Hilton, also in Manhattan) could not make it due to illness so Waldorf's wife Astoria came with him. Ayn Rand biographer Anne Heller wrote that the Waldorf Astoria inspired the "Wayne-Falkland Hotel" in Rand's novel Atlas Shrugged.

== See also ==
- Art Deco architecture of New York City
- List of hotels in New York City
- List of New York City Designated Landmarks in Manhattan from 14th to 59th Streets
- List of tallest buildings in New York City
- The Waldorf-Astoria Orchestra
- List of residences of presidents of the United States

Preceded by First	Venues of the Tony Awards; 1947–1953	Succeeded by Plaza Hotel
Preceded by Roosevelt Hotel	Venues of the NFL draft 1979	Succeeded by Park Central Hotel
