= Jay Neveloff =

American real estate lawyer

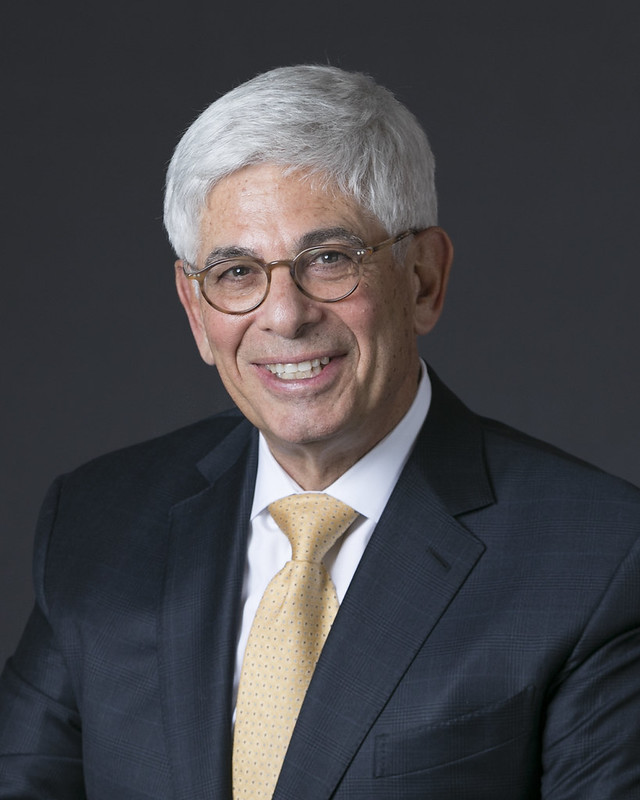
- Born: 1950 (age 75–76)
- Education: Brooklyn College; New York University School of Law
- Occupation: Lawyer
- Employer: Kramer Levin Naftalis & Frankel

Jay A. Neveloff (born 1950) is an American real estate lawyer known for representing Donald Trump and his companies. He is a partner in the law firm Kramer Levin Naftalis & Frankel.

== Law firm management executive ==
Neveloff has been a member of the Kramer Levin Executive Committee for more than 20 years and is chairman of the Real Estate Department.

== Legal career ==
He began in real estate at Marshall Bratter Greene Allison & Tucker in the early 1980s. He then moved to Rosenman & Colin. He became a partner approximately one year later, practicing in real estate and developing a client base that included The Trump Organization and Trump. In the summer of 1988, Neveloff joined his current firm, Kramer Levin, as a partner, practicing in the real estate department.

== Trump relationship ==
Trump and The Trump Organization have relied on Neveloff for real estate counsel and related business advice for more than 30 years, in matters such as Trump Tower, Trump Palace, Trump International in New York and Chicago, the GM Building, and the Plaza Hotel. Neveloff was among Trump's friends at the 2017 Presidential Inauguration.

In May 2017, after Donald Trump tweeted about possible tapes of conversations between himself and former FBI director James Comey before his dismissal, Neveloff was quoted as saying he "spent hundreds of hours in Mr Trump's office while he (Trump) talked on the phone and never saw him record calls."

== Government affairs ==
Neveloff's real estate practice intersects with regulatory issues. Neveloff lobbied for the elimination of ILSA filing requirements for vertical condominiums, which was approved by Congress and signed into law by President Obama in 2014 and effective in 2015.

He serves as a member of the Board of Governors of the Real Estate Board of New York and opines on legal issues involving various New York City government agencies, most notably, the City Department of Tax and Finance and in matters before the State Attorney General's Office.

== Honors and awards ==
Neveloff is included in the Chambers and Partners USA Edition rankings continuously, since 2003 and Thomson Reuters Super Lawyers.

Neveloff was first recognized by Thomson Reuters' New York Super Lawyers, in its 2016 inaugural edition with a cover story. He has remained on this list every year since.

== Education and credentials ==
Neveloff is a graduate of New York University School of Law, with a JD degree and earned his BA from Brooklyn College.
