= Kings Plaza =

Shopping mall in Brooklyn, New York City

Kings Plaza Shopping Center
- Main entrance (August 2020)
- Location: Brooklyn, New York, U.S.
- Coordinates: 40°36′36″N 73°55′12″W
- Address: 5100 Kings Plaza, 11234
- Opened: September 11, 1970; 56 years ago
- Developer: R.H. Macy & Co.; Alexander's
- Manager: Macerich
- Owner: Macerich
- Num. of stores: 150
- Num. of anchor tenants: 6
- Floor area: 1,100,000 square feet (100,000 m^{2})
- Floors: 2 (3 in Primark, 4 in Macy's)
- Public transit: MTA Bus: B2, B3, B9, B41, B46, B46 SBS, B47, Q35; New York City Subway: at Flatbush Avenue–Brooklyn College (via B41 and Q35) at Avenue U (via B3), Kings Highway (via B2)
- Website: kingsplazaonline.com

Kings Plaza (officially the Kings Plaza Shopping Center) is a shopping center within the Mill Basin section of Brooklyn in New York City, New York, United States. Opened in September 1970, it is located at the southeast corner of Flatbush Avenue and Avenue U, just north of Floyd Bennett Field. The mall was originally the property of a joint venture between Macy's and Alexander's, and is currently owned and managed by Macerich.

The mall features the traditional retailers Target, Burlington, Primark, and Macy's. Prominent specialty retailers include Cotton On, Sephora, Guess, and Zara. With approximately 4,200 jobs in retail services and over 120 individual stores, Kings Plaza is the largest indoor shopping center within the borough of Brooklyn.

== Overview ==
Kings Plaza is located along the south side of Avenue U, between Flatbush Avenue to the west and East 58th Street to the east. The mall occupies 23 acres (9.3 ha) of land. The primary block of the mall lies between Flatbush Avenue and East 55th Street. It contains two levels of mall stores, along with the Macy's and former Sears/Alexander's anchor locations which are both four floors high. Both anchor stores contain around 330,000 square feet (31,000 m^{2}) of space. At the south end of the block is a multi-level parking garage, accessible from northbound Flatbush Avenue and East 55th Street. The garage was built using specialized prestressed concrete columns, and holds nearly 4,000 cars. The eastern block is solely occupied by a Lowe's location and its adjoining parking lot. The block was entirely used for parking prior to the construction of the Lowe's. At the easternmost end of the site extending to East 58th Street is Mill Basin Plaza, a separate complex owned by Kimco Realty. It features The Home Depot, Walgreens, and Petland Discounts stores. Unlike traditional malls in the United States where parking is usually free, shoppers visiting Kings Plaza (as well as most other malls within New York City) have to pay for parking within the parking garage.

To the east and south of the mall is the Mill Basin Inlet, which separates the mall from the neighborhood of the same name. A marina called the Kings Plaza Marina is located along the perimeter of the parking garage. The original purpose of the marina was to allow shoppers to travel to the mall by boat.

Kings Plaza has its own cogeneration plant on the roof of the mall, dubbed the Kings Plaza Total Energy Plant. The plant uses four Deutz AG natural gas engines to produce the mall's entire electricity needs, while the heat from the engine exhaust is used to heat and cool the building. As part of a recent sustainability effort, Macerich has equipped the plant with an interconnection to provide up to 6 MW of excess power to the local Con Edison grid if and when needed, which has been used particularly in the summer heat season. The plant, which was built with the mall, originally used five Nordberg-built diesel engines.

=== Transportation ===
==== Kings Plaza bus terminal ====
A few months after the mall opened in 1970, the New York City Transit Authority, bowing to demands of Brooklyn residents eager to get to the shopping center, initiated a new set of bus transfers which eliminated mall-goers from having to pay a second fare on buses to Kings Plaza, years before all double fares in the city were abolished.

The mall soon began to serve as a terminal for the bus routes in the area. The B2, B9, B41, B46 and B46 SBS utilize a dedicated bus terminal on the Flatbush Avenue side of the mall, the B3 and Q35 serve the mall at intermediate stops, and the B47 terminates at the Avenue U entrance to the mall. The terminal was renovated in 2005. Since April 2017 due to construction, B2 and B9 buses terminate at the northeast corner of Flatbush Avenue and Avenue U, using the existing Q35 stop.

The closest New York City Subway stations are the Flatbush Avenue–Brooklyn College station (2 and 5 trains) on the IRT Nostrand Avenue Line in Midwood, and the Avenue U (Q train) and Kings Highway stations (B and Q trains) on the BMT Brighton Line in Sheepshead Bay and Midwood respectively.

== History ==
=== Construction ===
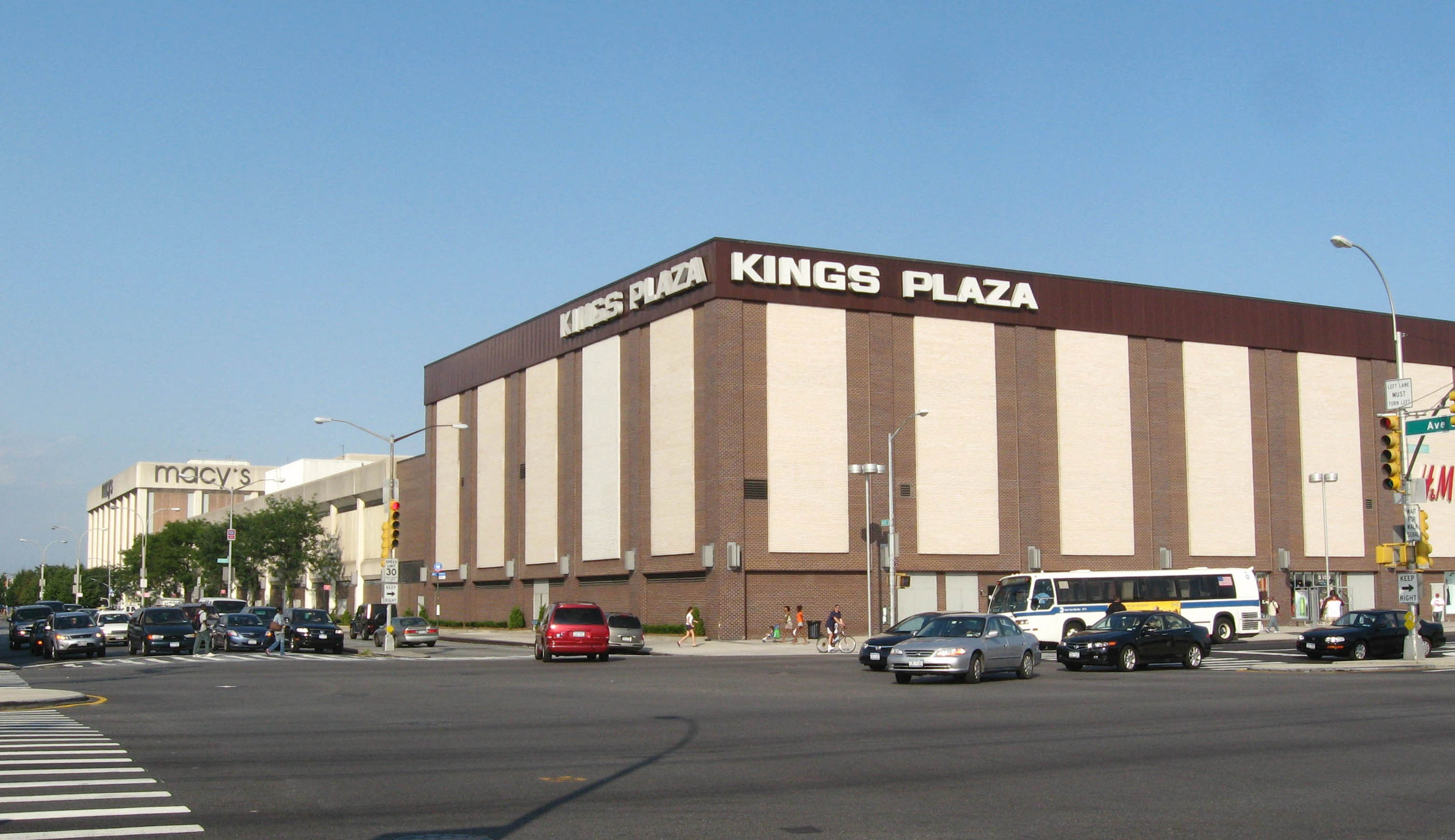
Kings Plaza, looking from the corner of Flatbush Avenue and Avenue U, as it appeared in 2008. Best Buy has since opened on the right of the picture, while renovations have changed the outer facade.

Prior to the construction of Kings Plaza, the site was occupied by a Standard Oil petroleum storage facility, built in the 1930s. The site was later occupied by a plastics producer and an auto garage. In 1965, the Alexander's department store chain announced it would build a new store at Flatbush Avenue and Avenue U, in order to expand to Southeast Brooklyn in response to residential development in Flatlands and Canarsie. Alexander's was competing with E. J. Korvette to build a store in the area. By 1966, the mall was planned as a joint venture between Macy's and Alexander's.

Ground was broken on Kings Plaza on July 8, 1968. The ceremonies were officiated by Alexander's president Alexander S. Farkas and Macy's president David L. Yunich, with Mayor John Lindsay and Brooklyn Borough President Abe Stark in attendance. Financing for the project was provided by John Hancock Financial. As part of the mall's construction, Flatbush Avenue and Avenue U were both rehabilitated, which included expanding Flatbush south of Utica Avenue to its current width. The bus terminal on Flatbush Avenue was also built along with the mall.

=== Opening and early history ===
The mall opened in September 1970, right after Labor Day, with 79 stores. Among these stores was the first location of the pizzeria chain Sbarro. A two-screen cinema was also opened along with Kings Plaza, while a marina on Mill Basin was expected to open the next year. The mall was the first in the city to be fully enclosed and air conditioned. In protest of the new mall, local residents barricaded nearby side streets to prevent traffic congestion from spilling over to residential blocks. The mall had expanded to 125 stores by the following year. The first "professional dinner‐theater" in Brooklyn opened at Cooky's Steak Pub, located within the mall, three years later. The number of visitors grew during the mall's first decade of operation. Although Kings Plaza's owners did not release official visitation figures, by 1983, there were 20,000 cars passing through the mall's parking lot each day, and the city was earning $12 million per year from sales tax collected at each of the 150 stores. However, both merchants and shoppers expressed concerns about theft at Kings Plaza, and that year, the mall expanded its private security force.

Initially, shoppers could park at Kings Plaza free of charge. In mid-1983, the owners of the mall proposed instituting a 50-cent parking charge to pay for improvements and the private security force, to be collected starting in October 1983. Shoppers' reactions toward the proposed fee were mixed, but local residents vehemently opposed the fee, causing its implementation to be delayed. The same month that parking fee collection was to start, community leaders organized a protest against the proposed fees. The parking fee was put in place in January 1984 and lasted four days before the New York City government ordered the mall to stop collecting the fee until a study on environmental impacts could be completed. Later that month, the parking fee was reinstated after the city's Departments of Environmental Protection and Buildings found no adverse effects would be caused by the fee, which was collected upon exit from the parking lot.

Macy's sold 50% ownership of the mall to Alexander's in 1985 which later acquired the other half in 1998. In 1992, Alexander's filed for bankruptcy and closed all its stores including the Kings Plaza location. Alexander's real estate holdings, including Kings Plaza, would live on as an affiliate of Vornado Realty Trust who assumed management of the property. The space remained vacant until 1997, when Sears took over the site. Though the opening of Sears was expected to revitalize the remaining shops in Kings Plaza, there was concern that newer shopping areas in Brooklyn such as Atlantic Terminal, the Fulton Street pedestrian mall, or the shopping district in Flatbush would create competition with Kings Plaza.

=== 21st century ===
The main atrium has a rotating two-sided video billboard.

A $50 million renovation program, begun in May 1999, included a new glass entrance at Flatbush Avenue and upgrades to the mall interior. Around 2002, the mall's owners planned to construct an addition to the mall, on the parking lot on the east side of East 55th Street. As originally planned, it would have added 100,000 square feet to the mall, with a home improvement store, a multiplex theater replacing the original mall theater, and indoor parking space. A new complex on the site had been planned going back to 1997.

The parking lot was closed in mid-2003 in preparation for the addition. Lowe's signed on to occupy the home improvement store two years later. The expansion faced community backlash due to fears of increased traffic in the area. The developers, Vornado Realty Trust (the successors to Alexander's), and the New York City Department of City Planning were also accused of conspiring to keep the local community in the dark about the progress of the addition. The community opposition led the developers to downsize the expansion to the single Lowe's store. Construction began in 2009, and the Lowe's was opened on July 23, 2010. The AMC Loews movie theater, an original tenant, closed its doors in January 2010. Further renovations turned the former theater into a new Best Buy location.

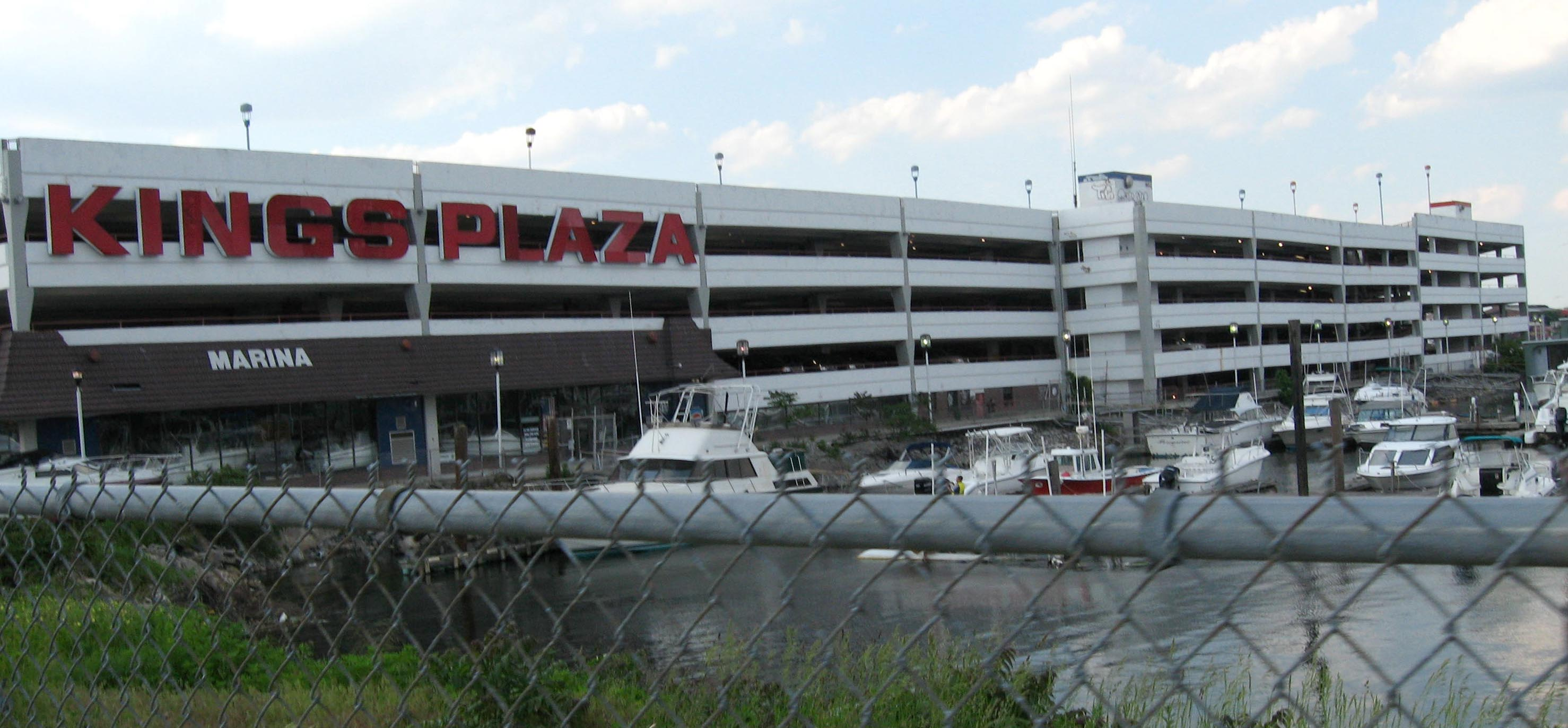
Mall parking garage and marina

It was announced in May 2012 that Alexander's/Vornado planned to sell the mall with the rest of the Vornado enclosed mall portfolio. Five months later, Macerich announced it was buying the mall, in a deal that closed at the end of that year. After Macerich's purchase, Kings Plaza underwent a significant renovation project which included reconstruction of the parking garage, renovation of the exterior facade and signage, as well as a renovation of the interior common areas and decor.

In September 2016, Macerich announced that the Sears store at Kings Plaza would close and be reconstructed for Primark and Zara. It was subsequently announced that Burlington would be opening in mid-2018 in the previous fourth floor offices of Sears, while JCPenney opened a multilevel, 75,000 square feet (7,000 m^{2}) new store format in a portion of the previous Sears outpost in August 2018. On July 7, 2020, JCPenney announced that it would close its store at Kings Plaza as part of a plan to close approximately 250 stores nationwide due to its Chapter 11 bankruptcy; the store would close on September 27, 2020. In late 2021, Target opened a store in the space formerly occupied by JCPenney. By the mid-2020s, there were 11 vacant storefronts, and visitor traffic had declined significantly compared with previous decades.

=== Incidents ===
On December 26, 2013, several hundred teenagers assaulted visitors and vandalized the mall, forcing it to close down. The incident began at about 5 p.m. and continued until the mall shuttered at 7 p.m. A temporary "no teens" rule was issued, banning all underaged people without an accompanying adult. One teenage girl was arrested, but not charged. No people were killed or seriously injured during the attack. It was reported that the incident was a violent flashmob organized via social networking services and intended to become the "world's largest knockout game".

On the morning of September 17, 2018, a seven-alarm fire broke out on the second and third floor levels of the mall's parking garage. Between 250 and 300 firefighters responded to the fire, and 21 people were injured by the fire, including 18 firefighters. One hundred and twenty cars belonging to a car dealership were parked on the second level. The New York City Police Department detained a suspect and filed arson charges the same day.
