= Jack Schwadron =

American businessman (1927-2011)

- Born: February 10, 1927; New York City, U.S.
- Died: October 11, 2011 (aged 84); Carmel Valley, California, U.S.
- Known for: President of E. J. Korvette, Best & Co., and Klein Department Stores

Jack Schwadron (February 10, 1927 – October 11, 2011) was an American businessman in retail. He started at Alexander's Department Store and went on to be president of E. J. Korvette, Klein Department Stores, and Best & Co.. He worked closely with Arthur G. Cohen of Arlen Realty & Development Corporation in choosing locations for expansion of stores.

== Early life ==
Schwadron was the son of Doris and Louis Schwadron, the co-founder of Alexander's. He lived with his first wife, Marilyn (née Hittner), and four children in Great Neck Estates and then moved to Kings Point at 152 West Shore Road. In 1948, he graduated from the University of Miami.

== Career ==
In 1948, Schwadron began work full time at Alexander's, a chain of department stores founded by George Farkas and his father, Louis Schwadron. Schwadron started off as head of stock in the executive training program, became manager of the department, assistant buyer, merchandising manager of the merchandising department and general merchandising manager of the store. For the first three years he was the manager of fashion business.

After 16 years, Schwadron met with Charles Bassine, a friend and customer of Eugene Ferkauf, who brought Ferkauf and Schwadron together in a meeting that took place in his kitchen in Great Neck, Long Island. Following the meeting, Schwadron left Alexander's and joined E. J. Korvette. Members of the Schwadron family with interest in Alexander's sold their stock interest in Alexander's to Korvette.

In 1961, he joined E. J. Korvette as vice-president and general merchandising manager.

Upon the opening of the store at Audubon Shopping Store in New Jersey, August 1961, Schwadron described the formula for success at Korvette by saying: "It isn't magic. We haven't pulled any rabbits out of the hat. It's a very simple formula. Namely: we don't tack costly services on to the price of the merchandise. We have service available if you need it. The same applies to delivery. We don't deliver unless the item is too big to be carried, but there again, you pay the delivery charge. Operational expenses are kept to a minimum. Add that to our tremendous buying power and you have a few of the reasons that Korvette has gone so far so fast!". He continued on to say that "the customer always buys for less". Fashion included couturier copies, Paris adaptations, imports and evening wear.

Schwadron commented that in 1962, newspaper advertising was more effective than radio advertising mainly to advertise store openings and special events.

In 1963, Korvette's opened 24 department stores, 11 food supermarkets, and 3 specialty stores.

In 1964, upon becoming President of Korvette at 37, Schwadron is quoted saying "When we went first to Detroit, people thought you spelled our name with a "C" and we were something you drive. But after 90 days, our customers - and our competitors - knew exactly who we were".

He announced a plan including the expansion of stores in New York City, it's suburbs and other cities including Chicago and Baltimore. Schwadron worked closely with Arthur G. Cohen of Arlen Realty & Development Corporation in choosing locations for the expansion of stores.

Under Schwadron, the record and audio division became an important part of the profits of Korvette's. In 1964, record sales reached $20,000,000 with David Rothfeld, merchandise manager for records, books and audio equipment described "as hard-hitting as the rest of the young driving force behind Korvette, right up to the company's new 37-year-old President, Jack Schwadron."

September 1964, discussions were announced by Schwadron and Hilliard Coan, chairman and president of Hill's, of a merger of Hill's Supermarkets with Korvette.

In June 1965, Schwadron resigned over policy differences including opposing philosophies on merchandising, methods of advertising and public relations, among others.

Hilliard Coan, who was chairman of the board of Korvette, was ousted the next year.

In September 1965, he joined McCrory Corporation as a consultant. Meshulam Riklas controlled McCrory's, which included the retailer stores Best & Co., Lerner Shops, and S. Klein.

While president of Best & Co., a 15-chain department store in New York City, Schwadron was quoted saying that unisex apparel is "a fashion, not a fad" for a Minneapolis Tribune Women & Society article.

In a September 1970 New York Times story noting that after an initial lag in August, back-to-school sales had picked up, Schwadron is quoted saying "Price consciousness has been evident and there is a practicality to clothes buying these days. People are less inclined to buy something that will have limited use." But he adds that many women had not yet seen "enough of the long skirts", making it too soon for retailers to make a judgement.

October 1970, Samuel Neaman, chairman of McCrory Corporation, owner of Best's, and Schwadron, announced that Best & Co. would be going out of business. The store building at 51st Street and Fifth Avenue would be replaced by the Olympic Tower, an office tower constructed by Olympic Airways in partnership with Arlen Properties.

March 1970, Francis Ford Coppola shot The Godfather scene between Michael Corleone and Kay Adams as they leave Best & Co. after shopping for Christmas gifts.

In The New York Times, Isadore Barmash wrote that Mr. Schwadron, Best's president, said: "The saddest aspect of the closing is ending an amiable and fine association that we have had with our employees. However, we are very confident that we can place 100 per cent of our people within our own corpora tion or with other companies and have already made arrangements with one or more Fifth Avenue stores to interview our people next week."

== Personal life ==
Schwadron is the father to four children: Laurie, Evan, David, and Helaine from his first marriage to Marilyn. He commuted to New York City by car, train and boat from his Kings Point residence during the summertime. Jack was married to Sylvia from November 1992 until his death in 2011 in Carmel Valley, California.

Schwadron's son David is a chef and has catered for prominent personalities including President Barack Obama and President Bill Clinton.
