= Vornado =

Vornado may refer to:

- Vornado Realty Trust, an American real estate investment company
- Vornado Air, American manufacturer of household electric fans etc.
- 15 Penn Plaza, New York City, also known as the Vornado Tower, a proposed skyscraper
