= Insignia Financial Group =

Defunct real estate company

- Industry: Real estate
- Founded: 1990; 36 years ago
- Defunct: 2003; 23 years ago
- Fate: Acquired by Aimco & CBRE Group
- Headquarters: Greenville, South Carolina
- Website: https://www.insigniafinco.com/

Insignia Financial Group was a company that invested in apartments that were financially distressed, with the goal of increasing value via recapitalization. It was founded and controlled by billionaire Andrew L. Farkas and was headquartered in Greenville, South Carolina. It was the largest manager of apartments, controlling 300,000 apartment units at its peak. The company was sold in two tranches in 1999 and 2003.

== History ==
Insignia was launched in 1990 by Andrew L. Farkas with about $5 million in family money. Farkas is the grandson of George Farkas, the founder of Alexander's, the nephew of Alexander S. Farkas, its former chief executive officer, and the son of Robin Farkas, its former chairman. The company received financing from Lehman Brothers.

In 1990, the company acquired the assets of U.S. Shelter Corp, which managed 55,000 apartments. After the acquisition, Insignia owned or operated about $1.5 billion in real estate assets in 32 states.

In October 1993, the company became a public company via an initial public offering led by Lehman Brothers.

In 1996, the company acquired the Edward S. Gordon Company for $74 million. Gordon then worked for Insignia until his death in 2000 from colon cancer, at which time Insignia received $19.1 million from a key person insurance policy taken on his life.

In 1997, the company was accused by the U.S. Department of Housing and Urban Development of giving $7.6 million in kickbacks to owners of subsidized housing. The company paid to settle the case without admitting any wrongdoing.

In 1997, the company acquired Cleveland, Ohio-based Realty One for $39 million.

In 1998, the company sold its apartment investment division to Aimco for $910 million in cash and stock.

In 1999, the company acquired Douglas Elliman from the family of Seymour Milstein for $65 million in cash.

In March 2003, the company sold Douglas Elliman to an affiliate of New Valley LLC for $73.5 million.

In 2003, the remainder of Insignia was sold to CBRE Group for $415 million in cash.
