= S. Klein =

Defunct department store franchise in US

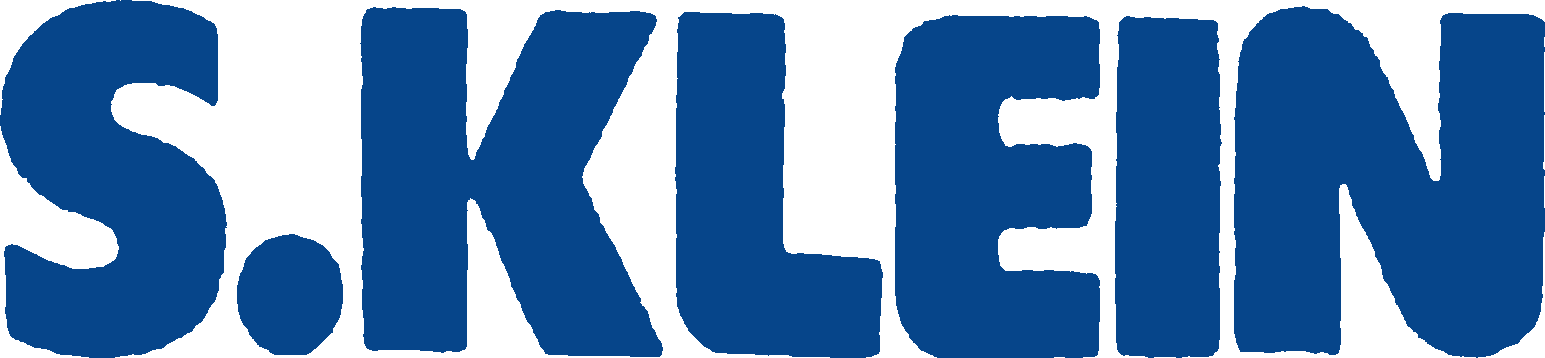
S. Klein logo

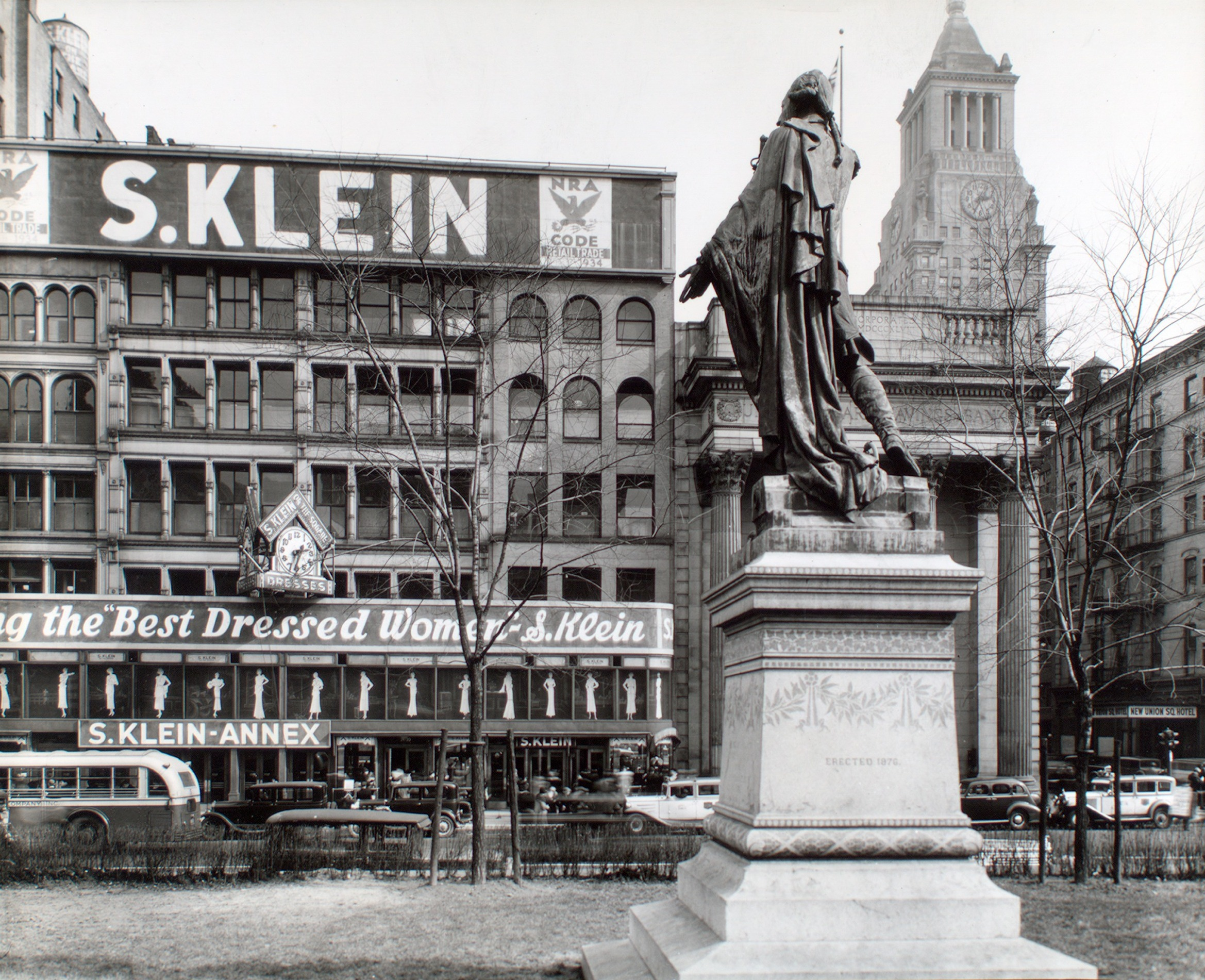
This 1936 Berenice Abbott photograph of Union Square shows the S. Klein annex building

S. Klein On The Square, or simply S. Klein, was a popular-priced department store chain based in New York City. The flagship stores (a main building and a women's fashion building) were located along Union Square East in Manhattan; this location would combine with the 1920s idiomatic catch phrase "on the square" (meaning "honest and straight-up") to provide the subtitle. S. Klein positioned itself as a step above regional discount stores of its time (Two Guys, Great Eastern Mills), more fashion aware than E. J. Korvette, and a more affordable option compared to traditional department stores like Macy's, or Abraham & Straus. S. Klein stores were full-line department stores, including furniture departments, fur salons, and full-service pet departments.

== Early years ==
Russian-born Samuel Klein (1886–1942) founded S. Klein in 1905, or around 1912, on the block of Union Square East, between 14th and 15th Streets (in the former Union Square Hotel).

Because of S. Klein's position as an important downscale store, Klein was one of the few businesspeople to increase his profits during the Great Depression as consumers became more cautious spenders and sought lower prices; Klein made over $1 million of profit every year during the Depression. To maintain low prices, S. Klein relied on very fast inventory turnover and low overhead costs; rent and staff salaries amounted to just 6-7% of the store's profits.

As was common at downscale stores at the time, S. Klein struggled with shoplifting. Up to $100,000 of stock was stolen every year, partly because customers served themselves unlike in more expensive stores. Large posters were placed on the walls inside the store warning "Dishonesty Means Prison" in five different languages, although it is contested whether Klein actually prosecuted all those caught shoplifting or not. Unruly behaviour was also a problem, especially during sales when customers would try to buy as much as possible. Albert Halper described one instance where "crowds of women were ... storming all the entrances to Klein's ... overturning tables stacked with handbags and blouses." Security guards were employed to try and prevent disruption.

Although there was no de jure racial segregation, S. Klein sought to only serve white customers. Benjamin Davis was told by one store worker that employees at Klein's and the neighboring store Ohrbachs, were encouraged to "insult Negro patrons so that they won't come back again".

== Suburban growth ==
S. Klein started to build new suburban stores in the 1960s but in an unusual way. Instead of being an anchor store in the regional malls being built at the time, S. Klein would often build as an outparcel near, but not connected to the mall itself. Most stores were located in New York and New Jersey in the greater New York City area. S. Klein operated stores as far south as Alexandria, Virginia, and at Beltway Plaza in Greenbelt, Maryland. S. Klein also had a presence in the Philadelphia and suburban market, with stores at Roosevelt Blvd, Marple-Springfield and Cherry Hill. The Glenolden store was added after acquiring the former Topp's building.

== Gradual decline ==
By the mid-1970s the parent company of S. Klein, Meshulam Riklis' Rapid-American Corp. (also owner of the McCrory Stores dime-store chain), seemed more interested in the real estate the company held than the retail operations (a fate Two Guys would fall to in 1982), and it started to close the stores in clusters. By 1978 the last of the chain's stores would close. The flagship store in Manhattan's Union Square is now the site of the Zeckendorf Towers apartment complex.

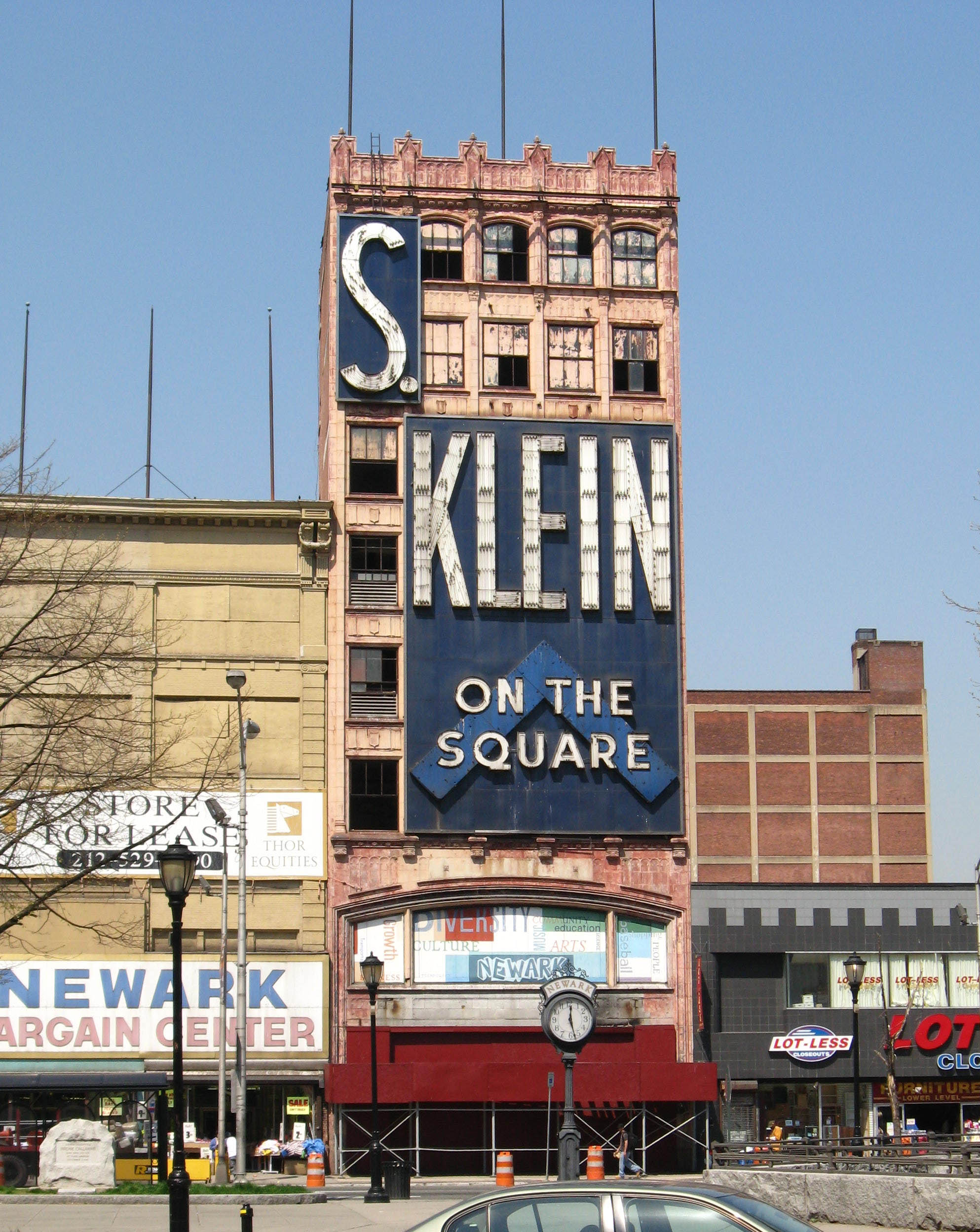
Newark store in 2008

== Traces of S. Klein today ==
The annex building, between 15th and 16th Streets, pictured in the 1936 photo above, remains as of 2022.

A significant part of the signage was still in place at Klein's former location in downtown Newark, New Jersey, until its demolition. This location had been vacant since the store was closed in 1976, and the neon sign (in 2008 photo) that proclaims, "S Klein, On The Square" complete with their neon carpenter's square logo was still intact as of 2012. In late 2012 the Newark planning board approved a proposal by the Prudential Insurance Company to build a new 20 story office building on the site of the S. Klein building, and several other long abandoned buildings. The S. Klein building was demolished in late July 2013.

== In popular culture ==
In the song "Marry The Man" from the musical Guys and Dolls, the lyrics mention three department stores: "At Wanamaker's and Saks and Klein's".

In the song "Drop That Name" from the musical Bells Are Ringing, Judy Holliday's character surprises the high society crowd when she mentions Klein's and says, "I do all my shopping there."

Klein's is mentioned in Season 2, Episode 7 of Mad Men.

Klein's is also mentioned in the 1966 dystopian novel Make Room! Make Room!, as one of their food sales starts a riot.
