= Alexander Farkas =

Alexander Farkas may refer to:

- Sándor Bölöni Farkas (1795–1842), or Alexander Farkas, writer
- Alexander S. Farkas (1930–1999), department store owner
