= Cessna CH-1 Skyhook =

American helicopter built by Cessna

CH-1 Skyhook YH-41 Seneca
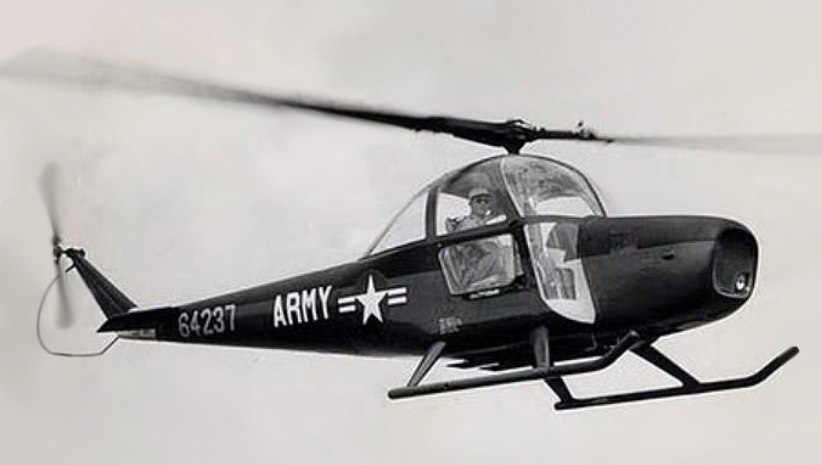
- YH-41 prototype

General information
- Type: Light helicopter
- National origin: United States
- Manufacturer: Cessna
- Designer: Richard Ten Eyck
- Status: Production ended December 1962
- Number built: ~50

History
- Introduction date: 1956
- First flight: July 1953
- Developed from: Seibel S-4

The Cessna CH-1 Skyhook is the only helicopter ever built by the Cessna Aircraft Company. It was the first helicopter to land on the summit of Pike's Peak and the last piston-engined helicopter to set the helicopter altitude record. The CH-1 had a single, two-bladed main rotor, and a front-mounted reciprocating engine which gave the aircraft a stable center of gravity (CG). Its semi-monocoque airframe greatly resembles its light airplane siblings built by Cessna. The CH-1 was named Skyhook for the civil market, similar to the marketing names used in the Cessna single engine airplane line, such as Skyhawk, Skylane and Skywagon. The United States Army designated the CH-1C as the YH-41 Seneca. While the CH-1 achieved several helicopter firsts and set a world record, it never became a commercial or military success.

== Development ==
Cessna Aircraft Company acquired the Seibel Helicopter Company of Wichita, Kansas on 14 January 1952 through a stock swap with Seibel investors. All equipment from the Seibel Helicopter Company, including the Seibel S-4B, was moved to Cessna's Pawnee Plant in Wichita and work began on the CH-1 design during the summer of 1952. Charles Seibel, who became the new Helicopter Division's chief engineer as part of the acquisition, believed that the S-4B with a Cessna body would make an excellent helicopter. Cessna pilots test flew Seibel's S-4B for several months to familiarize the engineers with helicopters, and then it was scrapped.

A quarter-size wind tunnel model of the CH-1 was created and tests were conducted at Wichita State University. The first full-size machine did not have an enclosed fuselage or cowling, nor a horizontal stabilizer. This test bed skeleton, referred to as CH1-1, first hovered in July 1953, eventually making test flights as high as 10,000 feet (3,000 m). The actual prototype CH-1 was built based on modifications made to the test bed aircraft and this second ship made its first flight in 1954, at the Prospect plant.

On 9 June 1955, the CH-1 received CAA type-certificate 3H10. Originally certified as a two-place helicopter, stability problems at higher gross weights required additional engineering solutions. A larger, free-floating horizontal stabilizer was introduced. During forward flight, the stabilizer pivoted to a variable mechanical stop, which was linked to the fore and aft cyclic control, thereby altering the stabilizer angle of incidence during flight. Reworking the stabilizer permitted the addition of a second row of seating, and the four-place ship, designated the CH-1A, was certificated on 28 February 1956.

=== CH-1B ===
In December 1955, Cessna was awaiting a contract to produce a limited number of CH-1s for evaluation by the Army. In preparation for the contract, Cessna began modifying the CH-1A with a Continental FSO-526 engine and other aerodynamic and structural changes in the possibility of eliciting a production contract. In spring 1956, the Army awarded Cessna with a US$1.1 million contract for 10 test aircraft, designated as the YH-41 Seneca. For marketing purposes, the CH-1A prototype (N5156) was painted in an olive drab Army scheme.

== Design ==
The aircraft incorporated a unique L-section hinges to attach the main rotor blades to the hub in place of more conventional pitch change bearings.

The CH-1 external design was created by Richard Ten Eyck, an industrial designer for Cessna. It was a low profile streamlined aircraft-style body, featuring the engine in front and cabin seating behind the powerplant. The forward engine location provided "ease of access,...efficient cooling, and frees the center of gravity behind the cockpit for use in disposable load," but also presented a problem for how to vent the exhaust which would prove to be a problem throughout the aircraft's life. Additionally, the tail boom size, resulting from the airplane-style fuselage, created aerodynamic problems in hover and forward flight that would have to be solved by later aerodynamic structural changes.

=== Engine ===
The prototype CH-1 was originally equipped with a supercharged Continental FSO-470 six-cylinder engine, producing 260 hp (190 kW) at 3,200 rpm. The engine's supercharger and cooling fans were driven by belts. Cessna had a long relationship with Continental who provided engines for the company's light airplanes, but the use of the Continental engine in a helicopter was as much of a test for the engine company, as Cessna's foray into the helicopter market, itself. This was especially true when considered that most other light helicopter manufacturers were using Franklin and Lycoming engines.

== Operational history ==
The CH-1 established many firsts. The CH-1A was the first helicopter to land on Pikes Peak, at an altitude of 14,110 feet (4,300 m) on 15 September 1955, it had a higher cruise speed than comparable machines, and a CH-1B, modified with an FSO-526-2X engine, set an official FAI world altitude record for helicopters of 29,777 feet (Note: Cessna's calibrated instrumentation showed 30,355 feet.) on December 28, 1957, while being piloted by Army Captain James E. Bowman. The previous record had been set by a turbine powered Aérospatiale Alouette II and was later broken by another Alouette II, but the record set by the CH-1B remains the highest altitude ever achieved by a piston-powered helicopter. The CH-1C was the first helicopter to receive instrument flight rules certification by the Federal Aviation Administration.

Production was ended in December 1962. The company indicated that this was due to the civil aviation market not being ready for this type of aircraft, although CH-1 owner Rex Trailer claimed that it was due to catastrophic transmission failures.

== Variants ==
CH1-1
test bed machine which did not have a skin, for initial hover and flight testing.
CH-1
The prototype CH-1 was powered by a Continental FSO-470 engine with a 2-place cabin.
CH-1A
Four-seat version of the CH-1 created by solving stability problems presented by the tail boom.

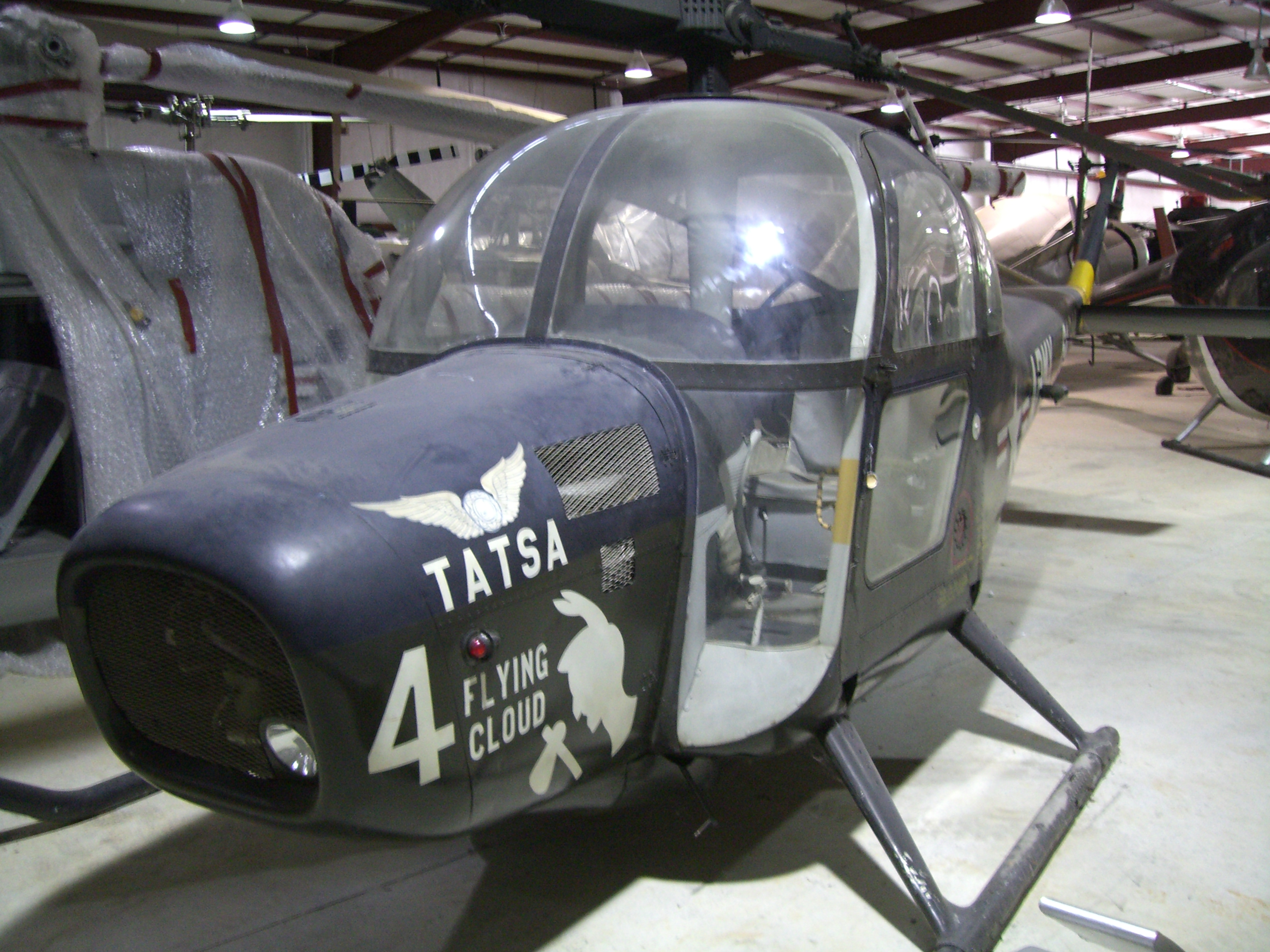
CH-1B designated YH-41

CH-1B
1955 changes to secure an Army contract. Continental FSO-526 engine producing 270 hp (200 kW) at 3000 rpm, with a gear-driven supercharger and horizontal cooling fan. An automatic collective pitch reducer lowered the collective pitch in the event of an engine failure.
YH-41
Ten CH-1Bs purchased by the United States Army for evaluation against possible future production contract.
CH-1C
UH-41A
15 CH-1C aircraft purchased by the United States Government for its Military Assistance Program (MAP) to foreign countries.
CH-4
Cessna's entry for the U.S. Army's Light Observation Helicopter program, it was a CH-1C powered by an Allison Model 250 engine mounted behind the rear passenger seat.
CH-1D
CH-1C modified with Continental's "Whirlaway" engine.

== Operators ==
Ecuador

- Ecuadorian Air Force - four UH-41As

Iran

- Iranian Army - five UH-41As, replaced by Bell 205 and Bell 206 aircraft.

United States

- United States Army - ten YH-41s for evaluation.

== Surviving aircraft ==
Approximately 50 machines were built before Cessna ended their venture into helicopters. Most of the aircraft built were bought back and scrapped by Cessna, and the type certificate was revoked, presumably to remove any liability to Cessna for continued operation of any helicopters they could not retrieve. The Army Aviation Museum at Fort Novosel, Alabama has a YH-41 Seneca prototype (serial number 56-4244) as a part of its collection, although it is not currently on display.

== Specifications (CH-1C) ==
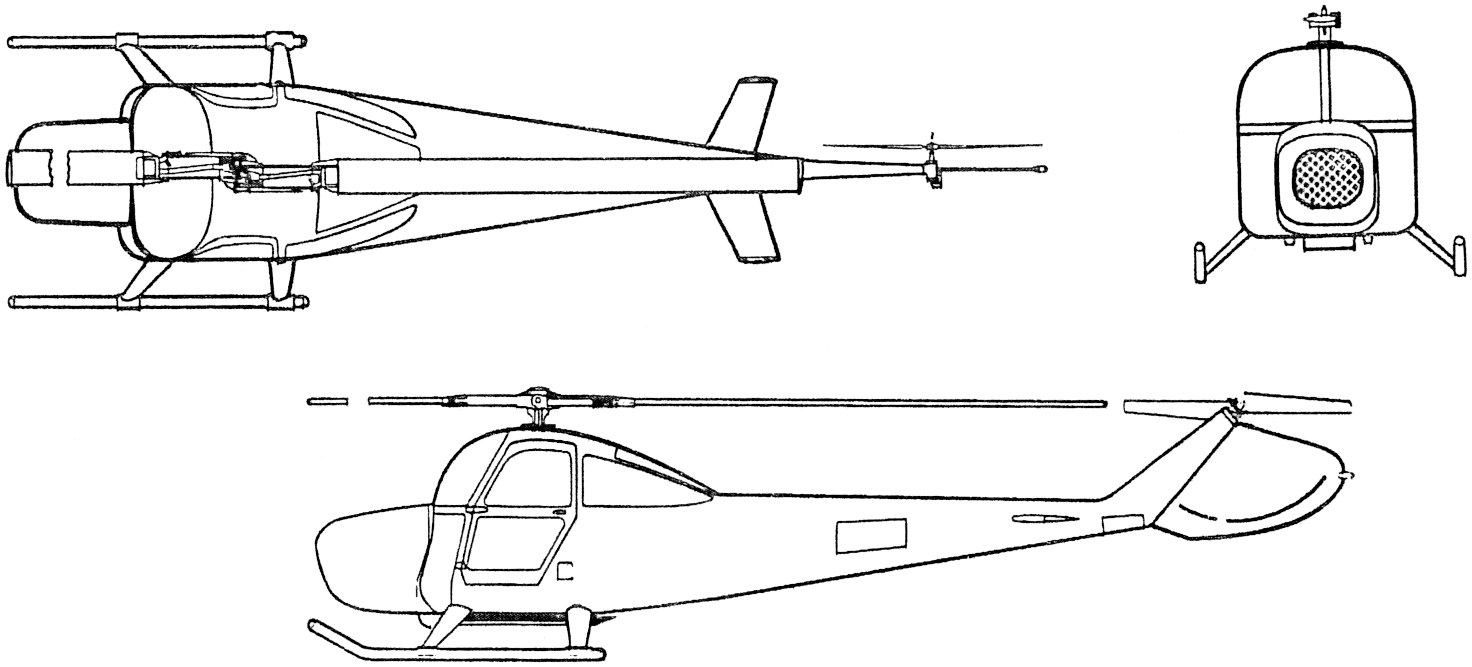
3-view line drawing of the Cessna YH-41 Seneca

Data from Jane's All The World's Aircraft 1961–62

General characteristics

- Crew: 1
- Capacity: 3 passengers
- Length: 29 ft 5 in (8.97 m) (fuselage length), 42 ft 6 in (12.95 m) (overall length)
- Height: 8 ft 3 in (2.51 m)
- Empty weight: 2,080 lb (943 kg)
- Gross weight: 3,100 lb (1,406 kg)
- Powerplant: 1 × Continental FSO-526-A air-cooled six-cylinder horizontally-opposed engine, 270 hp (200 kW)
- Main rotor diameter: 35 ft 0 in (10.67 m)
- Main rotor area: 962 sq ft (89.4 m^{2})

Performance

- Maximum speed: 108 mph (174 km/h, 94 kn) at sea level
- Range: 260 mi (420 km, 230 nmi)
- Endurance: 5.15 hours (with auxiliary fuel)
- Rate of climb: 1,030 ft/min (5.2 m/s) at 8,000 ft (2,400 m)

== See also ==
Related development

- Seibel S-4

Aircraft of comparable role, configuration, and era

- Bell H-13 Sioux
- Hiller OH-23 Raven
- Hughes TH-55 Osage
- Sikorsky S-52
- Sikorsky S-300
