= Unimart (California) =

Californian discount retailer

- Company type: Subsidiary
- Industry: Retail
- Defunct: 1967
- Fate: Merged into Vornado
- Parent: Food Giant

Unimart was a discount retailer in the Greater Los Angeles and San Diego metropolitan areas in the 1960s. Its locations variously became Two Guys, Gemco, and FedMart. Unimart was owned by Food Giant Inc. until it merged in 1967 with Vornado, the owner of Two Guys, which quickly converted Unimart stores to Two Guys. Most Two Guys locations transitioned into FedMart in the late 1970s, followed by Target in 1983.

In 1967, Greater Los Angeles branches included:

- Burbank
- Pomona
- Culver City
- Manhattan Beach
- Commerce
- Long Beach at Los Altos Center
- Alhambra
- Northridge
- La Mirada
- Norwalk
- Oxnard
