= Los Altos Center =

- Location: Los Altos, Long Beach, California United States
- Coordinates: 33°47′44″N 118°7′27″W
- Opened: 1955

Los Altos Center is a regional shopping mall in the Los Altos area of northeastern Long Beach, California along Bellflower Boulevard, 4 miles south of Lakewood Center Mall and 5 miles east of Downtown Long Beach.

== History ==
=== Launch (1953–1956) ===
Some stores opened on site in 1953; the full mall opened in 1955, designed by the L.S. Whaley Co.; Welton Becket was the architect. Trees, floral plantings, benches and canopies lined an outdoor center court with piped-in music, while parking surrounded the mall. "Friendly… casual… convenient, Los Altos Shopping Center" was the motto.

Stores that opened from November 1955 through January 1956 included the three anchor department stores:

- Walker's, costing $4 million, with 100,000 square feet (9,300 m^{2}) of retail space. Two years later in 1957 Walker's Los Altos store was sold to, and rebranded as, The Broadway. The Walker's had a "Palm Room" restaurant and coffee shop.
- JCPenney, two stories plus a basement
- Woolworth's, 14,000 square feet (1,300 m^{2}), with a 52-foot-long lunch counter
- Sav-on Drug Store (21,766 square feet (2,022.1 m^{2}))

Other stores included Horace Greens hardware, a Kinney's Shoe Store, a Long Beach National Bank, a 4,035-square-foot (374.9 m^{2}) John Norman Store for men, Alloway's Barber Shop, a 13,110-square-foot (1,218 m^{2}) Lerner's women's clothing store, at that time the 235th store in that chain; C.H. Baker Shoes, Children's Bootery, Dinels', Helen Grance Candies, Lonnie's Sporting Goods, Marie's' Kiddies Shop, The Music Box, Ramona Banking Co., J.C. Wehrman Jeweler, and Brownie's Toy Shop.

=== North section (1964) ===
The northern section, north of Stearns Street, opened in 1964 on 20.5 acres (8.3 ha) in two buildings with 130,000 square feet (12,000 m^{2}) of gross leasable area. New tenants at opening were Thrifty Drug Stores, Glendale Federal Savings & Loan, Leeds Shoe Store, Foreman & Clark, Zales Jewelry, the Singer Corporation, Household Finance, Dunn's Men's Wear, Quick 'n' Clean Laundry and Dry Cleaning, Alice King Beauty Salon, House of Fabrics and Winsted Bros. Camera, adding to the previous tenants Unimart discount store (became Disco Fair, later Two Guys and FedMart in the 1970's), Bank of America, Bob's Big Boy and Mobil gas station.

In 1963, The Broadway added an additional floor. In 1982, the FedMart store closed its doors, which is now a Target store, which opened in April 1983.

=== Decline ===
By 1990, the center was in decline. In 1996, The Broadway closed & the building was converted to a Sears.

== Today ==
The shopping center now houses a CVS Pharmacy, L.A. Fitness, T.J. Maxx, a grocery store, medical office & some smaller shops & restaurants.

On February 15, 2021, it was announced that Sears would be closing this location along with a standalone Kmart located North on Bellflower Blvd & Spring Street as part of a plan to close 34 stores nationwide. Both stores closed their doors by early May 2021.

== Transit Access ==
The shopping center is serviced by Long Beach Transit Routes 91, 92, 93, 94, 96 ZAP & 172.
