= Charlie Rose (talk show) =

American television interview show

- Also known as: The Charlie Rose Show
- Presented by: Charlie Rose
- Country of origin: United States
- Original language: English

Production
- Executive producer: Yvette Vega
- Production locations: Bloomberg Television; 731 Lexington Avenue; New York City
- Camera setup: Multi-camera
- Running time: 54–57 minutes
- Production companies: WNET; Charlie Rose, Inc.

Original release
- Network: PBS; Bloomberg Television
- Release: September 30, 1991 – November 17, 2017

Charlie Rose (also known as The Charlie Rose Show) is an American television interview and talk show, with Charlie Rose as executive producer, executive editor, and host. The show was syndicated on PBS from 1991 until 2017 and is owned by Charlie Rose, Inc. Rose interviewed thinkers, writers, politicians, athletes, entertainers, businesspeople, leaders, scientists, and fellow newsmakers.

== History ==
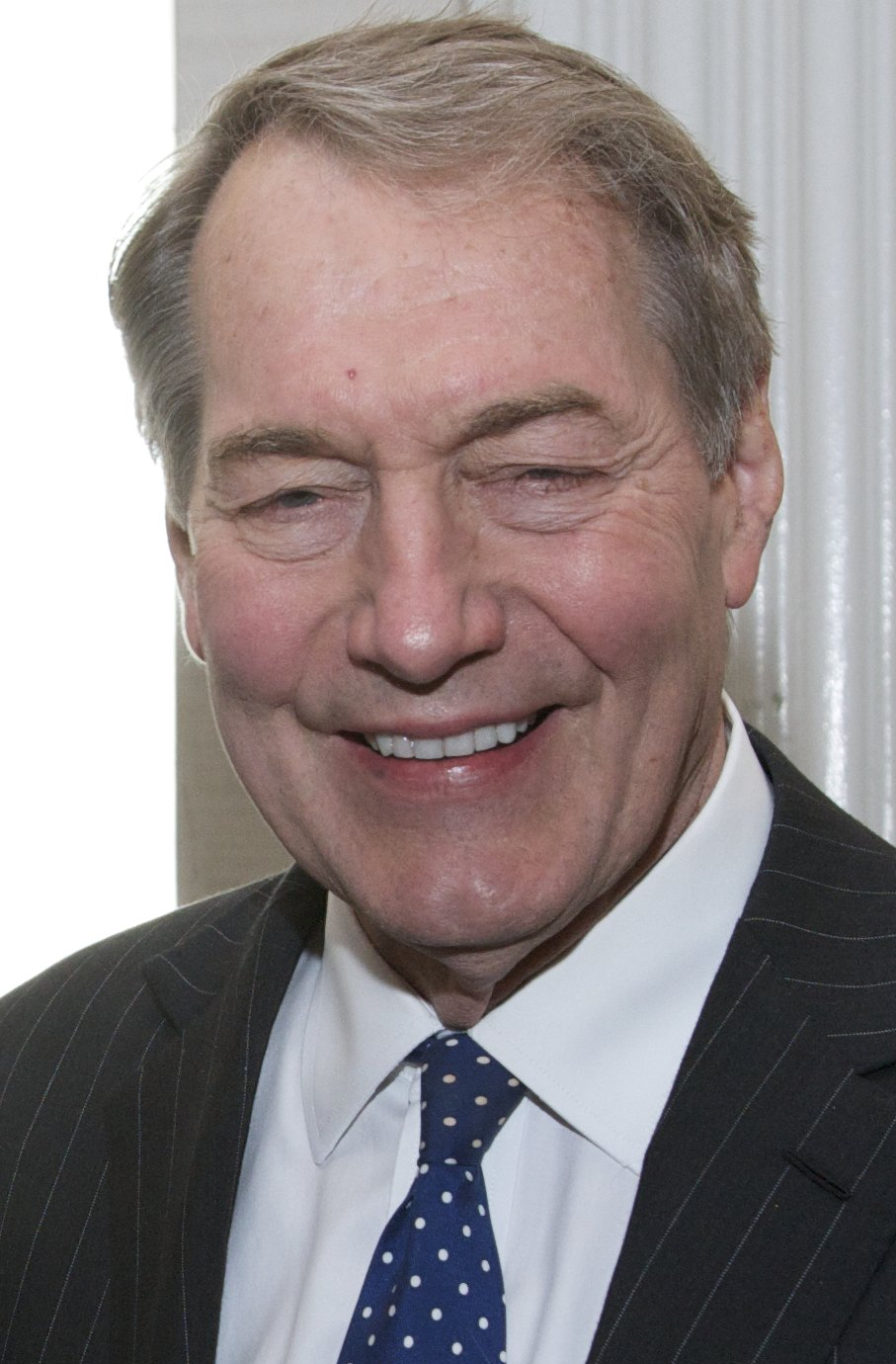
Charlie Rose, host and namesake of the show

The show premiered on September 30, 1991. It was formerly presented by WNET, where it first aired as a local program. The program was additionally broadcast by Bloomberg Television with a week delay, which formerly provided the show's recording facility. The set was simple, set up with an all-dark surrounding space around an oak round table used since the program debuted and purchased by Rose himself, along with accompanying chairs.

Funding for the show was primarily provided by donations from various corporations and charitable foundations. The program was criticized for not disclosing their list of donors within their underwriting disclosure.

In 2010, Rose and co-host Eric Kandel began The Brain Series, episodes featuring neuroscientists and other experts; the series was later released on DVD.

On May 7, 2012, Charlie Rose began broadcasting in high definition, with broadcasts in a letterboxed format for viewers with standard-definition television sets watching via either cable or satellite television. The program also introduced a new set and converted its graphics package to HD.

In October 2014, a segment called "Al Hunt on the Story" was launched as a "regular feature interview"; Hunt's first interview under this banner was with Secretary of State John Kerry.

The show was formerly taped at 731 Lexington Avenue in Midtown Manhattan, where Bloomberg Television and Bloomberg L.P. are based.

In February 2017, the show utilized a number of guest hosts (guest hosts also filled in for Rose on CBS This Morning) while Rose underwent heart surgery. Afterwards, Rose stated a planned return in March.

On November 20, 2017, WNET, Bloomberg Television and PBS announced the suspension of distribution of the show after former employees of Charlie Rose, Inc. alleged Rose sexually harassed them. Bloomberg Television also pulled reruns of the series within only an hour's notice. The next day, both PBS and Bloomberg cancelled distribution of the program and terminated their relationship with Rose; this de facto cancelled the show. CNNMoney reported on November 29 that Rose called the show's staffers and let them know they would be paid until the end of the year and released from their contracts at the start of 2018; their access to the Bloomberg headquarters where the show recorded to remove personal effects would be terminated on December 8.

On December 4, it was announced that Amanpour, a CNN International interview program hosted by Christiane Amanpour, would re-air on PBS as an interim replacement for Charlie Rose. Rose's show was ultimately replaced by Amanpour hosting Amanpour & Company.

== Show musical theme ==
The Charlie Rose music theme used up until its cancelation was composed exclusively for the series by David Lowe and David Shapiro, the father of Ben Shapiro.

== Charlie Rose: The Week ==
Charlie Rose: The Week premiered on PBS on July 19, 2013. The show was a half-hour long, consisting of interviews from recent episodes of Charlie Rose, with occasional unique segments produced for the weekly broadcast. The Week replaced the cancelled series Need to Know, and occupied that show's former Friday time slot. It was cancelled by WNET and PBS on November 20, 2017, due to the sexual harassment allegations. Both also removed the show's content and archives from their websites.

== See also ==
- List of longest-running United States television series
- List of programs broadcast by PBS
