= Seibel S-4 =

S-4/YH-24
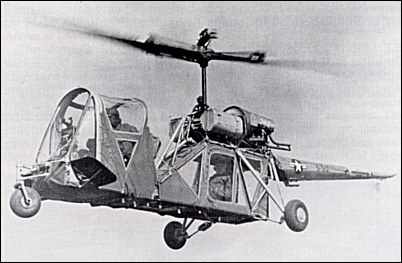
- YH-24 in flight

General information
- Type: light helicopter
- Manufacturer: Seibel Helicopter
- Designer: Charles Seibel
- Primary user: United States Army
- Number built: 2

History
- First flight: January 1949
- Developed into: Cessna CH-1

The Seibel S-4 was a two-bladed, single-engine helicopter built by Seibel Helicopter. Designed by Charles Seibel, the S-4 was evaluated by the United States Army under the designation YH-24 Sky Hawk, but would be rejected for service. The S-4B would serve as the basis for the design of the Cessna CH-1 Skyhook, the only helicopter Cessna ever produced.

== Development ==
Charles Seibel began development on the S-4 after forming the Seibel Helicopter Company with funding from local Kansas oil investors. The S-4 was a continuation of his work on his previous design, the Seibel S-3, which he flew as a demonstrator for his design concepts; primarily a new design for a two-bladed rotor system and a simplified transmission. These features would also be incorporated into the S-4 design.

In January 1949, the S-4 lifted off the ground for the first time, piloted by Johnny Gibbs. In March 1950, certification tests were completed and on 23 April 1950, the S-4 received civil certification by the CAA. A larger engine, the Lycoming O-290B with 125 hp, would be installed in the aircraft, making it the S-4A.

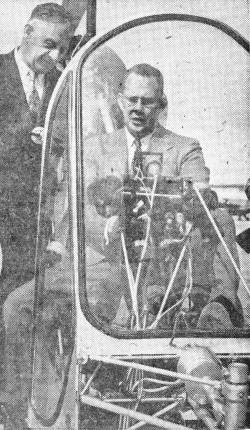
Gov. Frank Carlson and Charles Seibel at the CAA Certification Ceremony

Based on feedback from the Army during the evaluation, Seibel, shortened the fuselage of the second YH-24 (51-5113) and widened the cockpit for a co-pilot's seat next to the pilot's seat. Seibel also replaced that aircraft's original wheeled, tricycle undercarriage with landing skids. This aircraft would become the S-4B.

== Design ==
The S-4 frame was a welded steel-tube box frame, with two decks. A lower deck supported the control panel, pilot's seat, wheeled, tricycle landing gear, and a small passenger/cargo area accessible from the rear, and an upper deck carried the engine, the fuel and oil tanks, and supported the transmission and rotor assembly. A tapered, monocoque, alloy tail boom with a two-bladed antitorque tail rotor was attached at the rear of the upper deck.

== Operational history ==
Both the U.S. Army and U.S. Air Force showed interest in the S-4. In early 1951, the U.S. Army ordered two examples for operational and engineering evaluation in the observation, utility, and aeromedical evacuation roles. The Army designated the S-4 as the YH-24 Sky Hawk. The first Sky Hawk, serial number 51-5112, was delivered to Fort Bragg, North Carolina in April 1951; the second YH-24, serial number 51-5113, was delivered to Wright Field.

Despite the simplicity of the S-4, the Army determined that it did not provide a sufficient payload capability and the aircraft were dropped from the inventory and returned to Seibel in 1952.

== Variants ==
S-4
Original design, certified by the CAA in 1950.
S-4A
Featured an upgraded, 125 hp Lycoming O-290B engine.
S-4B
Modified airframe based on Army recommendations during YH-24 evaluation. Two-seat cockpit and skid landing gear.

== Specifications (YH-24) ==
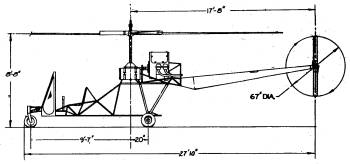
Orthographic projection of the Seibel S-4.

Data from U.S. Army Aircraft Since 1947

General characteristics

- Crew: 1
- Capacity: 1
- Length: 27 ft 10 in (8.48 m)
- Height: 10 ft (3.0 m)
- Empty weight: 960 lb (435 kg)
- Max takeoff weight: 1,540 lb (699 kg)
- Powerplant: 1 × Lycoming O-290-D 4-cylinder air-cooled horizontally-opposed piston engine, 125 hp (93 kW)
- Main rotor diameter: 29 ft 1.5 in (8.877 m)
- Main rotor area: 666 sq ft (61.9 m^{2})

Performance

- Maximum speed: 65 mph (105 km/h, 56 kn)
- Cruise speed: 58 mph (93 km/h, 50 kn)
- Range: 98 mi (158 km, 85 nmi)
- Service ceiling: 4,300 ft (1,300 m)
- Rate of climb: 700 ft/min (3.6 m/s)
