= Zeckendorf Towers =

Residential complex in Manhattan, New York

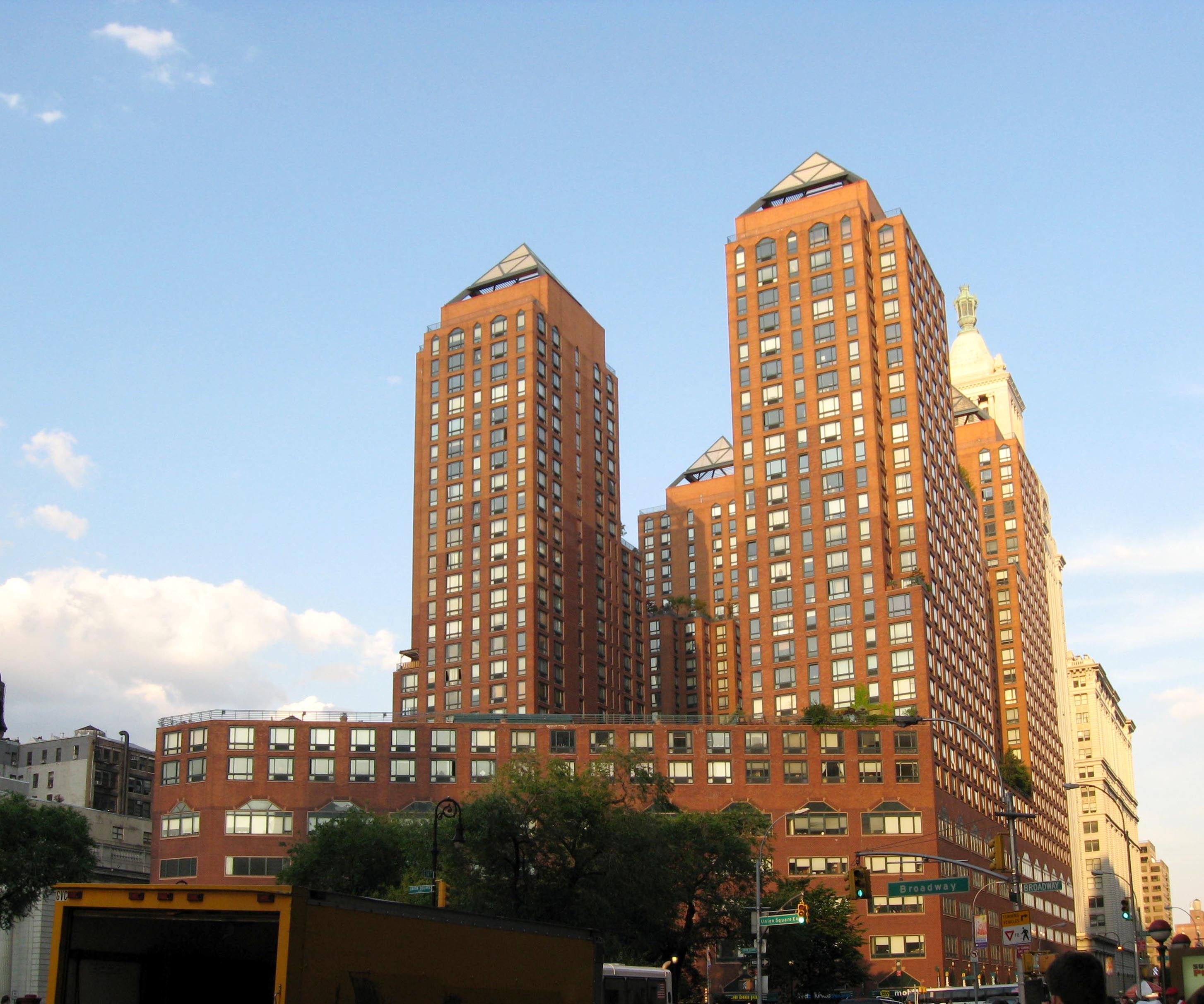
- Zeckendorf Towers in 2008

General information
- Type: Residential
- Architectural style: Postmodern
- Location: Union Square, Manhattan, New York City
- Coordinates: 40.734550°N 73.98950°W
- Completed: 1987

Height
- Antenna spire: 345 feet (105 m)
- Roof: 292 feet (89 m)

Technical details
- Floor count: 29

Design and construction
- Architect: Davis, Brody & Associates
- Developer: William Zeckendorf, Jr. Abraham Hirschfeld; Irwin Ackerman

The Zeckendorf Towers, sometimes also called One Irving Place and One Union Square East, is a 345 ft-tall (105 m), 29-story, four-towered condominium complex on the eastern side of Union Square in Manhattan, New York City. Completed in 1987, the building is located on the former site of the bargain-priced department store S. Klein. Designed by architectural firm Davis, Brody & Associates, and named in honor of prominent American real estate developer William Zeckendorf, it was one of New York City's most important development projects of the 1980s.

== Architecture ==
The towers are clad in red brick and the window frames are arranged to give vertical accents, while the fifth and top floors of the office portion of the base have arched windows. The top of the 29-story towers are each capped with screens in the forms of pyramids that are illuminated at night providing a notable contrast to the illuminated clocktower of the Con Ed Building just across Irving Place.

=== Green roof ===
The 14,000 square feet (1,300 m^{2}) of outdoor space on the building's seventh floor, formerly an undistinguished rooftop filled with potted plants, make up the largest residential green roof in New York. The green roof was added in 2010 as part of Mayor Michael Bloomberg's NYC Green Infrastructure campaign. The planted roof also serves to capture some of the rain that falls on it rather than letting it run off and contribute to flooding in the New York City Subway's 14th Street–Union Square station below it.

== History ==
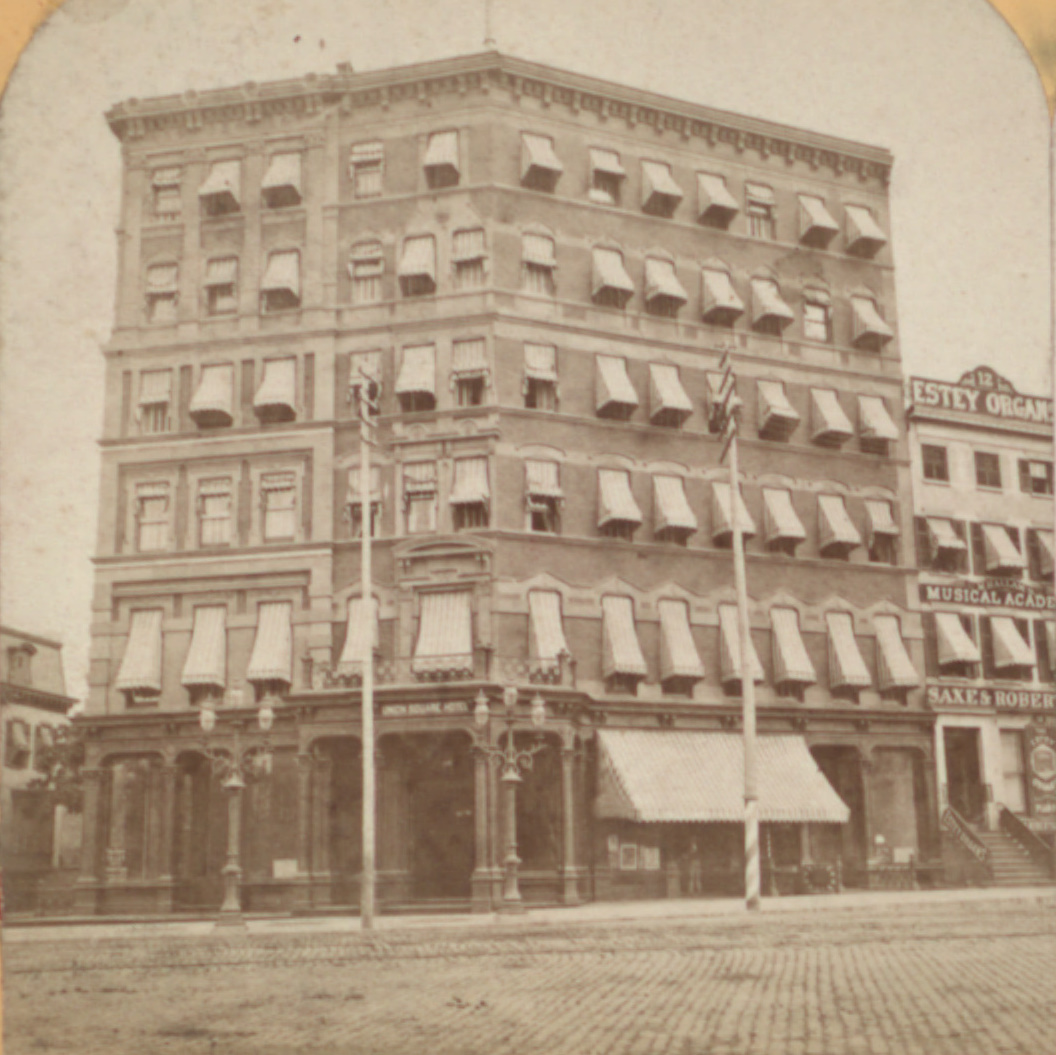
The former Union Square Hotel at the southeast corner of 15th Street and Union Square East. Political economist and single-tax advocate Henry George died here on October 29, 1897. Built in 1872, it was demolished in 1986 to make way for the Zeckendorf Towers

The full-block complex with its 670 apartments was built just before the renaissance of Union Square Park in the 1990s and became a part of the emergence of Park Avenue South and the Flatiron District as a rather chic neighborhood. The design by Davis, Brody & Associates did not originally capture much support from the public or the architectural press. At the time, preservationists began to draw the public's attention to the S. Klein site's architecture, which included the former Union Square Hotel, designed by James Renwick Jr., architect of many Manhattan buildings, including St. Patrick's Cathedral.

To realize the Zeckendorf plan, the site needed to be rezoned, a move that was rigorously opposed by the Union Square Coalition, a group largely made up of newer residents who had moved into lofts and apartments and feared the impact of real estate speculation on their rented homes. In order to receive final plan approval, the building which was originally planned as a single tower was scaled down in order to better fit in with the neighborhood. In addition, escalators serving the subway station were built as a public benefit in exchange for approvals to develop the site. As part of the deal, the Zeckendorf Towers condominium association was responsible for the machinery's maintenance.

In 1989, Vineyard Theatre opened a 130-seat venue in the basement of the complex. Developer William Zeckendorf Jr. donated 9,000 square feet (840 m^{2}) of space to the nonprofit theatre group, leasing it for one dollar a year.

== See also ==
- Architecture of New York City
- List of tallest buildings in New York City
