= 731 Lexington Avenue =

Office skyscraper in Manhattan, New York

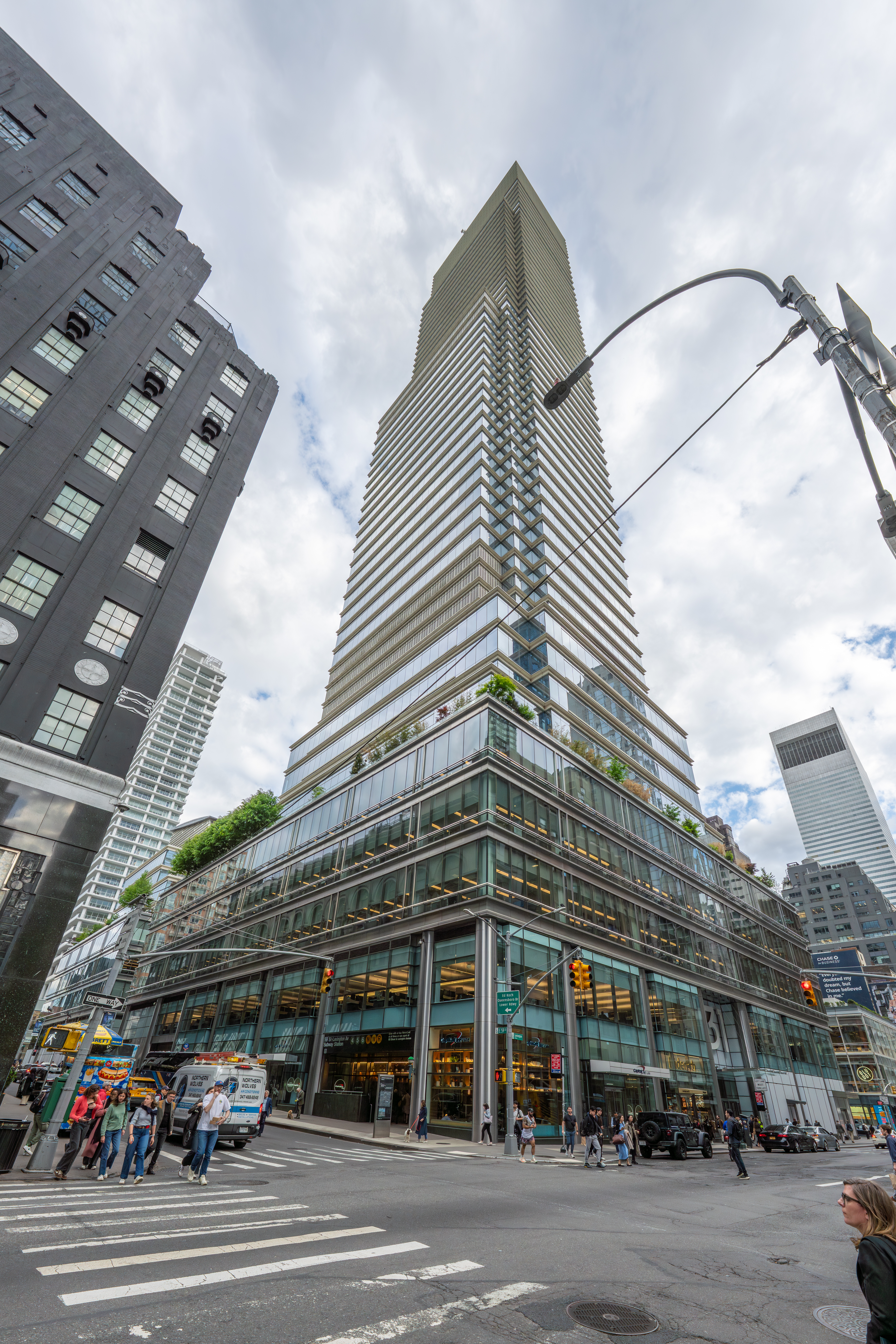
- Interactive map of the 731 Lexington Avenue area
- Alternative names: Bloomberg Tower; One Beacon Court

General information
- Type: Offices; Retail; Residential
- Location: 731 Lexington Avenue, New York, NY 10022
- Coordinates: 40.7618°N 73.9680°W
- Construction started: 2001
- Completed: 2004
- Cost: $450.225 million (Residential)
- Owner: Alexander's
- Operator: Vornado Realty Trust

Height
- Antenna spire: 286 m (938 ft)
- Roof: 246 m (807 ft)

Technical details
- Floor count: 55
- Floor area: 1,345,489 sq ft (125,000.0 m^{2})

Design and construction
- Architects: César Pelli & Associates
- Developer: Vornado Realty Trust
- Structural engineer: Thornton Tomasetti

731 Lexington Avenue is a 1,345,489 sq ft (125,000.0 m^{2}) mixed-use glass skyscraper on Lexington Avenue, on the East Side of Midtown Manhattan, New York City. Opened in 2004, it houses the headquarters of Bloomberg L.P. and as a result, is sometimes referred to informally as Bloomberg Tower. The building also houses retail outlets, restaurants, and 105 luxury condominiums. The residence section of the building is known as One Beacon Court and is served by a separate entrance.

731 Lexington Avenue is a 55-story building with a roof height of 806 ft (246 m). As of July 2022, it is the 40th-tallest building in New York City and the 85th-tallest building in the United States.

The building occupies the former site of an Alexander's department store and is owned by the Alexander's real estate investment trust, the successor to the defunct retail chain.

== Construction and design ==
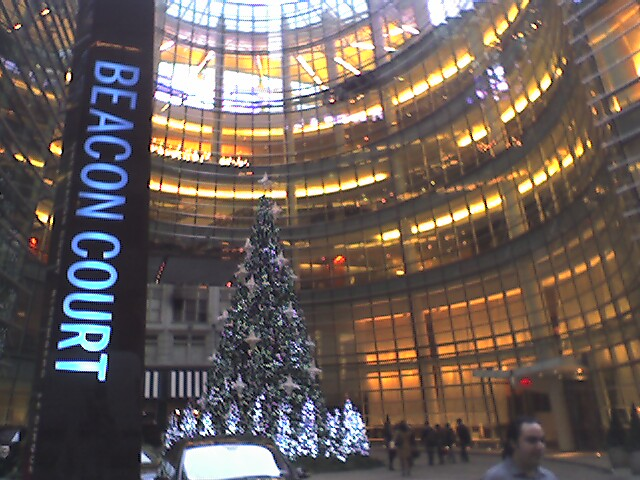
One Beacon Court sign inside the atrium

Construction on the building began in 2001, three years after the vacant Alexander's department store was demolished. The building was developed by Vornado Realty Trust, as a fee developer, with César Pelli & Associates as architect.

The building comprises a full city block between Lexington and Third Avenues and 58th and 59th Streets. The complex features two towers constructed above a steel office and retail section, separated by a seven-story atrium. The design of the courtyard at One Beacon Court, which connects 58th and 59th Streets, was inspired by other historic New York enclosures such as Grand Central Terminal, the reading room of the New York Public Library Main Branch, and the skating rink at Rockefeller Center; glass walls curve around the perimeter of the courtyard, tilting slightly inward as they rise.

== Tenants ==
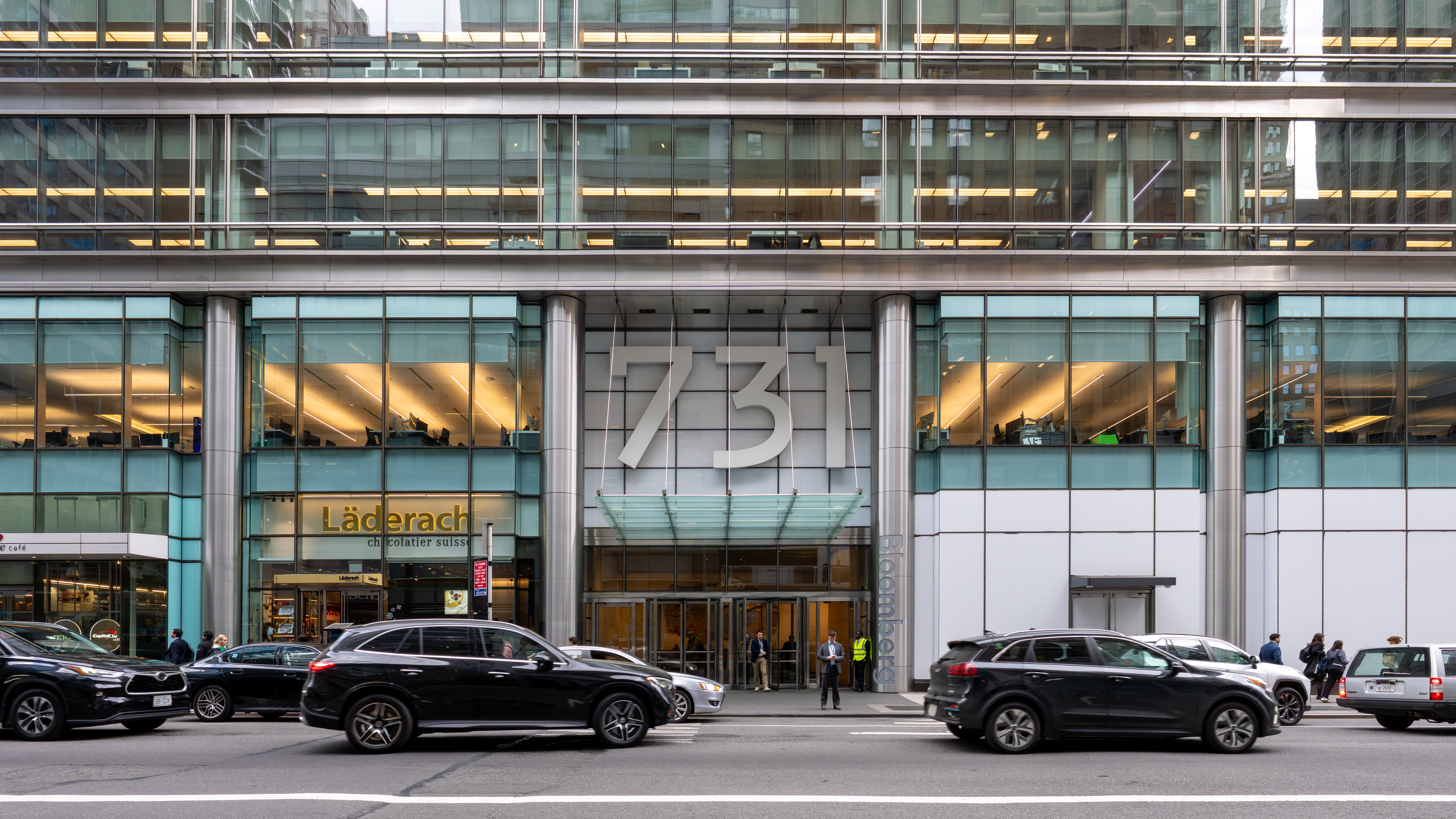
Lexington Avenue entrance to Bloomberg Tower, home to Bloomberg L.P.’s headquarters

Although the building was originally planned to be entirely residential, Bloomberg L.P. negotiated a deal with Vornado Realty Trust to lease 700,000 sq ft (65,000 m^{2}) of office space at the base of the tower. STUDIOS Architecture did the design, which includes rows of uniform desks for approximately 4,000 employees and a large central atrium known as "the Link" that overlooks the courtyard. Paul Goldberger, in the August 6, 2007, issue of The New Yorker magazine, lauded the Bloomberg offices as "a newsroom truly designed for the electronic age ... a dazzling work environment tucked inside a refined but conventional skyscraper." By 2011, Bloomberg L.P. added another 200,000 sq ft (19,000 m^{2}) of office space at 731 Lexington Avenue and announced plans to expand to an additional 400,000 sq ft (37,000 m^{2}) in the former Philip Morris building at 120 Park Avenue. Bloomberg pays Alexander's, the owner of the building, $105 million in annual rent.

The PBS commentary series Charlie Rose was formerly produced at 731 Lexington Avenue. Bloomberg Television also has its flagship studios in the building.

Retail tenants included The Home Depot, H&M, and The Container Store. Sirio Maccioni's Le Cirque restaurant moved to the building from The New York Palace Hotel in 2006, but vacated in 2018.

Residential tenants included Beyoncé, former NBC Nightly News anchor Brian Williams, and Bobby Abreu. Johnny Damon sold his unit for $8 million in 2010. Tina Knowles sold her unit for $5.6 million in 2011. Jack Welch purchased a unit in the building for $6.4 million and Jeffrey Immelt paid just over $4 million for a unit. Hedge fund manager Steven A. Cohen's unit was listed for sale for $67.5 million in 2017. Joseph Betesh, co-owner of hip hop clothing outlet Dr. Jay's, owned an apartment in the building from 2005 to 2013, which is now owned by VFT Investments.

== Amenities ==
Residents have access to concierge services by the London-based Quintessentially Group, as well as use of "The Beacon Club", the 29th-floor amenity space that includes a health club, entertainment suite, children's playroom and business center. Other amenities include a 24-hour doorman, garage, and valet parking.
