= Metric Hosiery Company =

- Company type: Private
- Industry: Clothing manufacturer
- Founded: January 1930 in New York, United States
- Founders: Weiss & Cahn
- Headquarters: 442-448 Fourth Avenue, Manhattan, USA
- Products: Hosiery

The Metric Hosiery Company was a New York City clothing manufacturing firm.

== Business history ==
Metric Hosiery leased property at 442-448 Fourth Avenue in January 1930 and incorporated in November 1932. The owners' names were Weiss & Cahn and the business was located at 220 West 42nd Street (Manhattan). The corporation's initial market capitalization was $20,000. The manufacturer was represented in advertising by the Theodore J. Funt Company, in November 1945.

At one point Metric Hosiery was a client of Raymond Loewy, "the father of industrial design".

Metric lost out to a rival business when E. J. Korvette stores transferred their buying of hosiery to Maro Industries. Gabriel I. Levy, a Yonkers lawyer, filed a $4.6 million damage suit in 1966 in United States District Court for the southern District of New York, in hopes of breaking up a one-year-old merger between Maro's Spartans Industries and E.J. Korvette.
