= Alexander's =

Real estate investment trust and former department store chain

Alexander's, Inc.
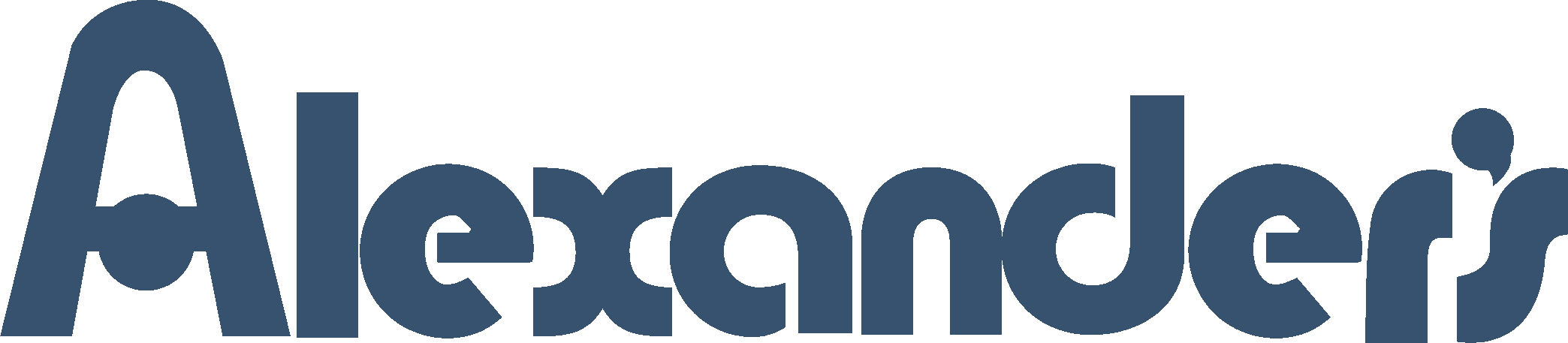
- Type: Public
- Traded as: NYSE: ALX; Russell 2000 Index component
- Industry: Real estate investment trust
- Founded: 1928; 98 years ago
- Founder: George Farkas, Louis Schwadron
- Headquarters: Paramus, New Jersey, United States
- Key people: Steven Roth (chairman & CEO); Matthew Iocco (CFO); Alexander S. Farkas
- Revenue: ▼$199 million (2020)
- Net income: ▼$41 million (2019)
- Total assets: ▲$1.404 billion (2019)
- Total equity: ▼$203 million (2019)
- Owner: Vornado Realty Trust (32.4%); Steven Roth & partners (26.1%)
- Number of employees: 70 (2020)
- Website: www.alx-inc.com

Alexander's, Inc. is a New York City-based real estate investment trust that owns seven properties in the New York metropolitan area. Founded as a department store chain by George Farkas and Louis Schwadron in 1928, it is controlled in 2026 by Vornado Realty Trust.

Alexander's included 16 stores at its peak in 1981 before it filed for bankruptcy in 1992. Six of Alexander's 11 stores (at the time of the 1992 bankruptcy) were located in buildings owned by the company. Locations included a store that occupied the entire block between East 58th and 59th streets and Lexington and Third Avenues in Manhattan (now the location of 731 Lexington Avenue), a store in The Mall at the World Trade Center, an anchoring store in the bustling shopping district of Fordham Road in The Bronx, and a store in Paramus, New Jersey that featured one of the largest murals in the world.

Among the trust's current properties is 731 Lexington Avenue, the headquarters of Bloomberg L.P.

== History ==
George Farkas was a Brooklyn born and raised merchant. In 1928, he opened a department store on Third Avenue in the Bronx with $7,500. (~$110,935 in 2025) Named for his deceased father, Alexander, the store catered to the well-to-do middle class, offering discounted designer clothing and high-quality private label goods. Its advertising slogan at one time was "You'll find Alexander's has what you're looking for; how lucky can you get?!"

The chain thrived even during the Great Depression, and opened a location on Fordham Road and the Grand Concourse in the Bronx in 1933. At its heyday in the 1930s, this store was known for its discount bargains and had higher sales per square foot than any other store in the United States.

Farkas was known for being a master at selecting locations for his stores, buying the real estate instead of leasing.

In February 1959, the company opened a store in Rego Park, Queens.

In 1963, the company opened its flagship store on 59th Street in Midtown Manhattan after it bought the land from a company controlled by Joseph P. Kennedy Sr. for what seemed like a high price of $125 (~$1,006 in 2025) per square foot.

In December 1968, Alexander's became a public company via an initial public offering, raising $41.17 million (~$290 million in 2025), in part to prevent a takeover from competitor E. J. Korvette. Founder George Farkas retired that year due to failing health and one of his sons, Alexander S. Farkas, became CEO.

In the 1970s, customers defected to larger competitors such as Macy's and Bloomingdale's, and discount stores such as Kmart.

Alexander's opened its 10th store on October 15, 1971 in the Roosevelt Field shopping mall.

Upon completion of The Mall at the World Trade Center in 1974, Alexander's became its anchor store. The location occupied roughly 1/6 of the WTC's 500,000 square foot mall, the largest in New York City, and was located underneath 4 World Trade Center, immediately to the east of the south tower.

In 1980, after a proxy fight, Interstate Properties, controlled by Steven Roth, took control of the company, seeking to maximize the value of its real estate.

In 1981, management attempted to expand offerings beyond leisure apparel.

In 1984 at the request of Interstate Properties, then holding a 13% stake, Alexander S. Farkas resigned as CEO and was succeeded by his brother, Robin (1933-2018).

In 1986, Donald Trump bought approximately 20% of the company.

=== Closure and real estate business ===
1987 was the last year in which the company made a profit from its retail operations.

In 1988, Interstate and Trump each raised their stakes to 27% of the company, but Trump pledged his interest as collateral for a personal loan from Citibank, and in 1991 was forced to turn over his holdings to the guarantor.

In 1992, Roth and creditors forced the company into bankruptcy and the company shut all 11 stores on May 15, 1992, laying off 5,000 people. The bankruptcy was also triggered by a put option Gruss family held to sell its 18% interest in the partnership that owned the 59th street store to Alexander's for $35 million and the company did not have the money.

In 1993, the company emerged from bankruptcy. The combination of an increase in value in its real estate holdings and shedding of its liabilities caused its stock to skyrocket from $8.50 per share before it declared bankruptcy to $57 per share a year later.

In 1995, Vornado Realty Trust bought the interest from Citicorp (formerly owned by Donald Trump) for $54.8 million.

In November 2012, the company sold the Kings Plaza mall in Brooklyn to Macerich for $751 million and used the proceeds to pay a $122 per share dividend to stockholders.

== Mural at the Paramus store ==
The Alexander’s location opposite Garden State Plaza in Paramus, New Jersey, was the site of an abstract art mural painted on glass with enamel by Polish artist Stefan Knapp that was displayed on the outside of the store. The mural was hung on the side of the building facing Route 4 and remained there until the building’s demolition in 1998.

George Farkas had approached artist Salvador Dalí to paint a mural for the Paramus location and the two had agreed to terms on a contract. However, sometime after that, Farkas was traveling abroad and came across a mural painted by Knapp while walking through London’s Heathrow Airport and decided to commission him to paint a mural as well. Dalí demanded that he do the piece, which would include giraffes with drawers suspended from their necks hanging out over the street, and was willing to let Knapp paint the giraffes. Farkas responded by giving the job to Knapp in its entirety, but still paid Dalí for his input. Knapp’s theme was a map of the world painted as he viewed it during his time as a pilot in the Royal Air Force after his emancipation from a Soviet prison camp.

When it was completed in 1963, the 280-panel mural was the largest in the world, measuring 200 by 50 feet (61 by 15 m) and weighing more than 250 short tons (230 t). Farkas was enamored with the work and hired Knapp to paint murals at stores in Valley Stream, New York, and White Plains, New York.

The store was closed in 1992 and the building sat unused. In 1996, Steven Roth, the chairman of Vornado Realty Trust, announced that the store would be redeveloped into a shopping center anchored by Ikea. Will Roseman, mayor of nearby Carlstadt, New Jersey, and a director of the Bergen Museum of Art & Science contacted Roth in an attempt to save the mural. After it was appraised by Sotheby's the mural was donated to the Bergen Museum of Art & Science, which stored it in a garage in Carlstadt.

In June 2015, pieces of the mural were displayed at the Art Factory in Paterson, New Jersey. However, Roseman held back 20 sections because he was worried that the Art Factory would sell the work. The sections were laid out in rows, with some having specific themes.

In September 2021, the directors of Valley Health System and the mayor of Paramus announced that they would be installing fifty pieces of the mural in various spots along the campus of The Valley Hospital, which opened in Paramus in 2023.
