= Vornado Air =

American home appliance brand

Vornado Air, LLC
- Vornado logo as of 2015
- Formerly: Vornadofan, O. A. Sutton Company
- Type: Limited liability company
- Industry: Manufacturing
- Founders: Ralph K. Odor (1945), Ottis A. Sutton (1945), Michael Coup (1990)
- Headquarters: Andover, Kansas, United States
- Products: Fans and household appliances
- Brands: Vornado, Vornadofan
- Website: vornado.com

Vornado is an American brand of fans, circulators, and accessories based in Andover, Kansas, United States. The current incarnation of the company was founded in 1989, two years after the death of Ralph K. Odor (1895–1987), who founded the firm in the 1930s with Ottis A. Sutton in Wichita. The name of the company is a combination of Vortex and Tornado.

== History ==
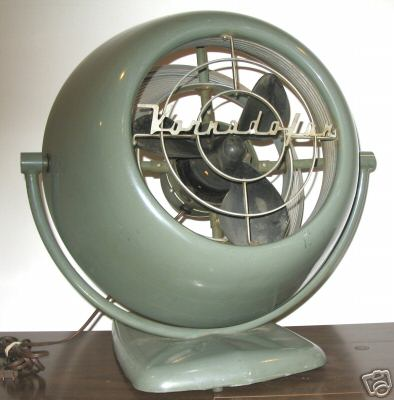
Vornado Model 12D1, 20 inches (5 dm) in diameter, Bakelite blade, circa 1945

Ralph K. Odor experimented with different designs to improve airplane propellers in the late 1920s. In the 1930s, Odor met Ottis A. Sutton and the two men continued to experiment with different designs for propellers and were granted several patents. Odor and Sutton realized the propeller designs could also be applied to household fans, and after the end of World War II, the O.A. Sutton Corporation began marketing Vornado fans under the "Vornadofan" brand name.

The name Vornado is a portmanteau of Vortex and Tornado.

Early fans were distinguished by enclosure in a short cylindrical duct, with an added concentric flared intake duct ring, sharply pitched blades, stationary vanes and aerodynamic grille, and rubber shock-mounting. This archetype was also the first to eschew oscillation in favor of a stationary design focused on the continuous circulation of the air in the room. The design was advertised as making the fan exceptionally quiet, efficient, and effective, delivering a narrower, more concentrated blast of air than normal fans.

The brand later added a line of air conditioners.

Amid sales that had fallen to half of their peak, the company ceased production in September 1958 and began liquidating its inventory, and manufacturing and office equipment were auctioned off in June 1959. Sutton's air conditioner coil manufacturing line was purchased by Gibson Refrigerator Co. and moved from Wichita. In October 1959, the O.A. Sutton Corp. was purchased by the discount department store chain Two Guys, which subsequently renamed itself Vornado, Inc.

The consolidated company expanded the Vornado line of appliances to more than 50 in under three years, including ranges, freezers, hair dryers, and electronic can openers sold by the Two Guys chain as well as other dealers, though the manufacturing operations were outsourced. That company eventually divested all retail operations and evolved into what is now Vornado Realty Trust, a real estate investment trust.

From 1997 to 2008, the Vornado headquarters in Andover hosted the Antique Fan Collectors Association's (AFCA's) Antique Fan Museum in their lobby, featuring antique electric fans sourced from AFCA members around the world, as well as some modern Vornado products. In 2008, the museum relocated to Zionsville, Indiana at ceiling fan manufacturer Fanimation's headquarters.

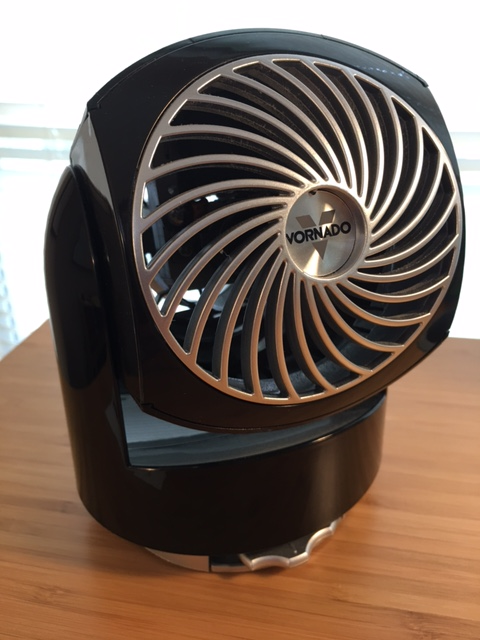
Vornado table fan model Flippi V6

== Current ==
The Vornado brand name was resurrected in 1989 by Michael Coup. Operating under the name Vornado Air Circulation Systems Inc., Coup obtained the rights to the Vornado trademark and worked with original designer Richard Ten Eyck to come up with a new fan design. Initially the company operated in northeast Wichita (Vornado's original hometown). The design consisted of a unique spiral front grille with patented "Vortex Action" technology, which allowed air to exit in a spiral pattern, and bounce off of walls, allowing for whole-room air circulation. The air circulators also contained modern updates of some classic Vornado features, such as the rear air inlet (which allowed ambient air to enter through the rear of the fan to be recirculated and a plastic, three-winged blade with a unique design. These air circulators were available as table, floor, stand, or window models, and were available in different colors. The "Vortex Action" technology and uniquely-designed blade was also used for Vornado-branded heaters, air purifiers, and humidifiers.

Between January 1989 and August 1990, Vornado sold about 135,000 of its fans with a distinctive spiral front grille. In August 1990, competitor Duracraft began offering a cheaper, visually similar fan, and by November 1992, Duracraft had sold nearly one million of them—that company's second-largest-selling household fan. Vornado sued under the Lanham Act claiming deceptive imitation in appearance—but an appeals court ruled against Vornado, because the design had been a part of their expired patent, and was now in the public domain.

In the late 1990s, Vornado introduced a line of reproduction fans, starting with the Silver Swan table fan, which was based on the Emerson Electric Silver Swan table fan from the Art Deco era in the 1930s. The line expanded with modern reproductions of Vornado's own "VornadoFan" air circulators. The "Alchemy Series" was introduced in 2017, featuring custom finishes and a custom storage bag included with each product.

According to the U.S. Consumer Product Safety Commission (CPSC), from January 1993 through February 2004, Vornado received over 300 reports of defective heater units overheating, melting, smoking, or catching fire. The CPSC alleged that Vornado Air Circulation Systems, Inc., failed to promptly report these incidents to the CPSC as required by law, saying Vornado only reported the incidents to the CPSC after CPSC staff started asking questions, in February, 2004.

In December 2006, Vornado Air Circulation Systems sold most of its assets to a private equity firm, which formed a new company, Vornado Air, LLC., in Wichita's neighboring suburban community of Andover.

In January, 2008, the CPSC reported that a liquidating trust, acting on behalf of the by-now dissolved manufacturer, Vornado Air Circulation Systems, Inc. (formerly of Andover), agreed to pay the government a $500,000 civil penalty, settling the prior CPSC allegations against Vornado Air Circulation Systems Inc., regarding the 300-plus unreported defective heater units. Vornado did not, however, concede any violation of law.

On August 14, 2014, the CPSC announced a recall of 79,000 Vornado-brand electric heaters (Vornado VH110 Whole Room Vortex electric space heaters) which had been made in China for Vornado Air, LLC, of Andover, and sold for about $60 at several major retail store chains and online sellers. The recall followed 29 reports of units overheating and melting, including seven reports of heaters catching fire, resulting in one report of smoke inhalation and one report of property damage caused by soot and smoke.

In 2017, Vornado introduced their line of Energy Smart air circulators (fans). The fans feature Direct Current (DC) motors, are manufactured at Vornado's headquarters in Andover, and have an infinitely-variable speed controls with either a manual rheostat-type control, or a digital pushbutton control panel. The Energy Smart line has since expanded to air purifiers and humidifiers.

== See also ==
- Vornado Realty Trust, a realty company which shares the name due to its acquisition of the O.A. Sutton Company
