= Petland Discounts =

American chain of pet stores

Petland Discounts, Inc.
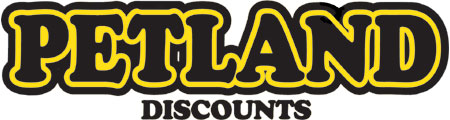
- Type: Pet Store
- Industry: Retail
- Founded: Glen Oaks, New York; 1965
- Defunct: April 2019
- Headquarters: Brentwood, New York
- Key people: Neil Padron, founder and President
- Products: Pet Supplies, Grooming, Training
- Website: petlanddiscounts.com

Petland Discounts was a privately owned chain of pet stores based in Brentwood, New York. The company was founded in 1965 with a store in Glen Oaks, New York. At its peak, Petland Discounts had expanded up to 100 stores and served the states of New York, New Jersey, and Connecticut.

Petland Discounts was also involved in providing a school program teaching students and introducing an experience with pets to children of all ages.

== History ==
Petland Discounts began in September 1965 when Neil Padron opened up his first store in Queens. Its name was originally used as a concept of a tropical fish store, selling various aquatic merchandise.

After 50 years, Petland Discounts had expanded up to 100 stores in the New York-New Jersey-Connecticut tri-state area, while offering a full line of pet supplies, such as live fish, birds, and small animals.

On January 14, 2019, Neil Padron died of bladder cancer. He was 74.

On January 18, 2019, the chain filed notice with the New York State Department of Labor that it would likely be closing all of its stores. They were all shuttered as of April 18, 2019. Declining sales brought on by price competition with online vendors were blamed for the possible closures.

== The Humane Society pledge ==
While there was talk of New York banning the sale of pets, Petland Discounts had gone towards becoming a puppy-friendlier pet store. In June 2010, 62 stores in New York City had signed The Humane Society of the United States pledge against Puppy Mills, stating that the chain would not sell puppies, but instead supported local animal adoption programs and taught customers on how to locate a reputable breeder.

"This company sets a positive example of corporate responsibility for other businesses to follow," said Stephanie Shain, senior director of the HSUS' puppy mills campaign. Petland Discounts chain had never sold puppies, supported animal shelters and pet adoption, and was part of the solution to the puppy mill problem."

== Slogans ==
- "Petland Discounts. For people who love pets." (mid–late 1980s)
- "Petland Discounts. At Petland we care." (late 1980s–early 1990s, but kept using it until mid-2000s in most of their TV commercials)
- "Petland Discounts. For the best care a pet can get." (early 1990s–2000s)
