= Richard Ten Eyck =

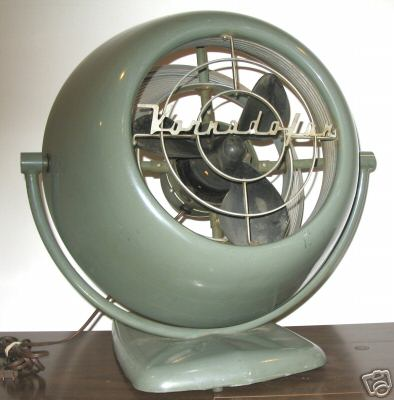
Vornado

Richard Ten Eyck (1920 – January 1, 2009) was an American industrial designer noted for his airplane designs for Cessna, Beechcraft, and Bell Helicopter (now Bell Textron). He is perhaps best known for his design of electric fans for Vornado Air during the 1940s and 50s.

Ten Eyck was born in Marseilles, Illinois, in 1920 and from 1938 to 1939 he studied industrial design at the University of Illinois. He later worked on product designs for aircraft, farm machinery, and consumer items, including Westinghouse air conditioners and products for the department store Montgomery Ward. He started his own firm, RTA in Wichita, KS in 1948.

Ten Eyck recounted that in addition to redesigning items to make them more functional, ergonomic, and visually appealing, one of his design goals was to eliminate “mischievous annoyances, the discomforts, the awkward aspects of a product.”

His fan designs for Vornado in the 1940s and 50s were inspired by the turbines in jet engines and became icons of Mid-century modern design. The company stopped manufacturing fans in 1959 but was revived thirty years later. The owner of the new company collected vintage Vornado fans and hired Ten Eyck to consult on new designs. Ten Eyck died on January 1, 2009, in Orlando, Florida.

Works by Ten Eyck and archival material from his practice are held in the collection of Art Institute of Chicago.

Fans based on Ten Eyck's designs are sold at Target, Lowe's and Bed Bath & Beyond.
