= Two Guys =

Defunct American department store

Two Guys, Inc.
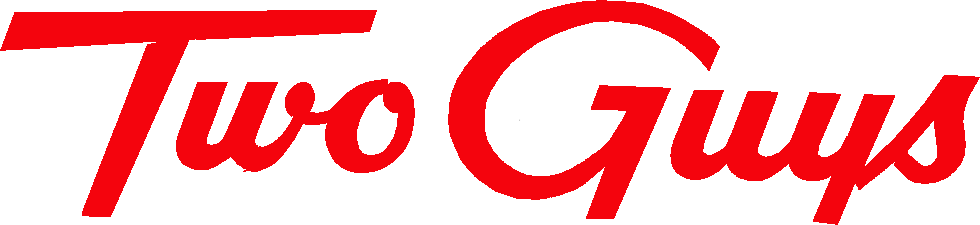
- Type: Private
- Industry: Retail
- Founded: 1946; 80 years ago in Harrison, New Jersey, US (as Two Guys From Harrison)
- Founder: Herbert Hubschman; Sidney Hubschman
- Defunct: February 8, 1982; 44 years ago
- Fate: Liquidation
- Successor: Vornado Realty Trust
- Headquarters: Harrison, New Jersey
- Products: Clothing, footwear, bedding, furniture, jewelry, beauty products, toys, sporting goods, electronics, housewares, hardware, automotive, appliances, records, and food

Two Guys, Inc. (dba Two Guys) was a discount store chain founded in 1946 by brothers Herbert and Sidney Hubschman in Harrison, New Jersey, originally selling major appliances such as televisions. The chain acquired the manufacturers of the Vornado appliance brand in 1959, and spread beyond the New York City metropolitan area to more than 100 locations in upstate New York, eastern Pennsylvania, New Jersey, Connecticut, Massachusetts, Maryland, Virginia, and as far as California. The company's financial success started to decline in the late 1970s, and it was defunct by 1982.

== History ==
In 1946, the Hubschmans operated a snack bar concession in the Radio Corporation of America (RCA) plant in Harrison, New Jersey, which was one of the earliest US manufacturers of television sets. They became friendly with one of their customers, an RCA executive who invited Herbert to tour the plant. During the tour, Hubschman saw a batch of scratched-cabinet television sets returned from the retailers as unsalable. The Hubschmans worked out a plan to buy these sets for a low price, and sell them in a vacant lot for a $5 markup on each set, providing their own publicity using car windshield flyers. The sale was so successful, that the batch they figured would take a month to sell were gone in a few hours. They continued the arrangement with RCA, and soon were ready to open their own store and use newspaper advertising. By this time, they had heard of their competitors whining, "We can't compete with those two bastards from Harrison!" The Hubschmans wanted to use that as the store name to taunt the competition, but no newspaper would print it, so they settled on Two Guys from Harrison.

In 1959, the company acquired O. A. Sutton Corporation, manufacturers of the Vornado line of electric fans, air conditioners, and dehumidifiers. The merged company was renamed Vornado, Inc. On January 31, 1962, the company went public on the New York Stock Exchange under the symbol VNO. At its peak, there were more than 100 Two Guys locations nationwide, including Upstate New York, Connecticut, New Jersey, Massachusetts, Pennsylvania, California, Maryland, and Virginia.

In the late 1960s, Vornado decided that it wanted to diversify further by looking for a retail merger partner outside Two Guys mid-Atlantic marketing region. In 1967, the executives of the firm thought they had found its perfect match on the West Coast when they found a diversified Southern California retail giant that was almost as large as Vornado which was called Food Giant Markets, Inc. Food Giant owned 70 supermarkets that traded under the Food Giant name, 14 Unimart discount stores, 14 Builders Emporium do-it-yourself hardware stores, and six package liquor stores. It also operated Meyenberg Milk Products, which served 200 franchised Fosters Freeze outlets, and Golden Creme Farms, which operated a milk plant, bakery, and ice cream distributorship. At the time of the merger, Vornado had 33 Two Guys stores in New York and five neighboring states.

The merger soon went sour, and the performance of most of the former units of Food Giant plummeted. Vornado blamed the former managers, while everyone else blamed Vornado for trying to impose an East Coast way of doing things that was not appropriate for a West Coast clientele.

As Vornado's commercial fortunes declined throughout the mid-to-late 1970s, they began selling off Two Guys stores to various companies. In late 1980, Vornado was taken over by real estate investor Steven Roth through his company, Interstate Properties, Inc., after he noticed that the land that the stores sat on was worth much more than the stores themselves as an ongoing concern. Interstate began the process of liquidating its Two Guys outlets by closing the stores, which had posted a loss of $20 million (~$59.9 million in 2025) for the first half of 1981, and leasing the physical locations to other retailers. After selling all of the retail stores, Vornado was later renamed Vornado Realty Trust, having become a real estate management company dealing in valuable commercial retail space.

== Store operations ==
Many locations originally included a discount store with a supermarket, as well as complete hardware, major appliance, and automotive service departments. The Two Guys supermarkets were full sized "stores within a store." They competed directly with large supermarket chains in the region at the time like Acme, Food Fair, Penn Fruit, Grand Union, A&P, Pathmark, and ShopRite. Trading stamps like Plaid and S&H Green Stamps were popular supermarket promotions into the early 1980s, and Two Guys supermarkets had its own private label trading stamps. Completed books of Two Guys trading stamps could then be turned in for merchandise credit slips that could be used in any non-food Two Guys department. The supermarkets used the tag lines, "Two Guys, The Super Supermarket" and "We're Putting Money Back in Your Pocket, Naturally", while the main store used the tag line, "We Save Money For You, Naturally". Several stores, including Bordentown, East Brunswick, East Hanover, Union, and Totowa, New Jersey had an attached liquor store and bar called The Chicken Barn. An arcade that included a 20 ft bowl-o-rama game which used actual bowling pins was in the back right of the Dover, NJ location. It was succeeded by developer Vornado Realty Trust, which developed – and in many cases still owns – the land on which Two Guys stores once stood.

One of the chain's more unusual operations was its outlet in downtown Newark, New Jersey. This location was originally the flagship of the Kresge-Newark department store, and for a brief time Chase-Newark. Two Guys operated on four floors of this building (later 3), and operated this store more like a traditional department store. Two Guys continued to maintain display windows, revolving doors and other touches of a traditional downtown department store. This location also included an in-store dining room, The Rainbow Cafeteria. This store opened in 1967, and remained until the chain's liquidation.

Bernard Marcus, one of the founders of Home Depot, began his retail career when he convinced the Hubschmans to let him operate the cosmetics concession at a Two Guys store in Totowa, New Jersey. He eventually was put in charge of first sporting goods and the major appliance department. He left the company prior to Herbert Hubschman's death. Incidentally, Home Depot opened a store on the same plot of land Two Guys occupied in the mid-1990s (after Two Guys went out of business, the Totowa store was subdivided and redeveloped into a shopping center anchored by Bradlees; Bradlees later moved to a newly built store, and the part of the old Two Guys building it had occupied was demolished to make way for a newly built Home Depot). The Kearny, New Jersey location on Passaic Avenue became a flea market, then a TSS Store, and lastly a Pathmark grocery store after the original Two Guys building was demolished.
