= Alexander S. Farkas =

American businessman (1930–1999)

- Born: April 3, 1930; New York City, US
- Died: July 28, 1999 (aged 69); Highland Park, Florida, US
- Known for: CEO of Alexander's

Alexander S. Farkas (April 3, 1930 – July 28, 1999) was the chief executive officer of Alexander's, a department store.

== Early life and education ==
Farkas was the son of George Farkas, the founder of Alexander's, and Ruth Lewis Farkas, a sociologist and the US Ambassador to Luxembourg.

Farkas attended Choate Rosemary Hall and The Bronx High School of Science. He received a Bachelor of Arts from the University of Chicago in 1949 and studied business at Cornell University.

== Career ==
Although Farkas originally wanted to be a professor, in 1951, his father George forced him to work for the store, first as head of stock in the women's coat department. In 1959, after undergoing a rigorous training program, Farkas was named president and general merchandising manager. In his first year, Farkas doubled the chain's advertising budget and made arrangements with European houses to get their excess inventories.

In 1963, Farkas is credited with pushing the company to buy the land for its flagship store on 59th street in Manhattan from Joseph P. Kennedy Sr. for what seemed like a high price of $125 per square foot.

In 1968, his father retired as CEO of Alexander's and Alexander took the position. That same year, the company became a public company via an initial public offering and each of George's sons owned stock worth $2.5 million.

The company suffered losses in the early 1980s and in 1984, at the request of Interstate Properties, which owned 13% of the company at that time, Alexander Farkas resigned as CEO and was succeeded by his brother, Robin Farkas (1933-2018).

== Family ==
Through his brother, Robin, he was the uncle of billionaire Andrew L. Farkas, who founded Insignia Financial Group.

His mother was President Nixon's Ambassador to Luxembourg. His younger brother Jonathan is married to Somers Farkas, who was confirmed to be US Ambassador to Malta in October 2025.

Farkas was married 5 times and had 3 children from his 3rd marriage.
