= E. J. Korvette =

American chain of discount department stores (1948–1980)

- Final logo, used for nine months
- Type: Discount department store
- Industry: Retail
- Founded: 1948
- Defunct: December 1980; 45 years ago
- Fate: Bankruptcy
- Headquarters: New York City, United States
- Area served: Eastern United States

E. J. Korvette, also known as Korvette’s, was an American chain of discount department stores, founded in 1948 in New York City. It was one of the first department stores to challenge the suggested retail price provisions of anti-discounting statutes. Founded by World War II veteran Eugene Ferkauf and his friend, Joe Zwillenberg, E. J. Korvette did much to define the idea of a discount department store. It displaced earlier five and dime retailers and preceded later discount stores, like Walmart, and warehouse clubs such as Costco.

The company failed to properly manage its business success, which led to decline and its 1980 bankruptcy and closure.

== Innovations ==
E.J. Korvette's founder, Eugene Ferkauf, began his discounting career in a 400-square-foot (37 m^{2}) loft in mid-Manhattan, New York City. Inventory consisted of well-known brands of luggage, household appliances, and some jewelry. Discounts were one-third off regular prices. Sales were more than $2,500 per square foot. Ferkauf retired in 1968.

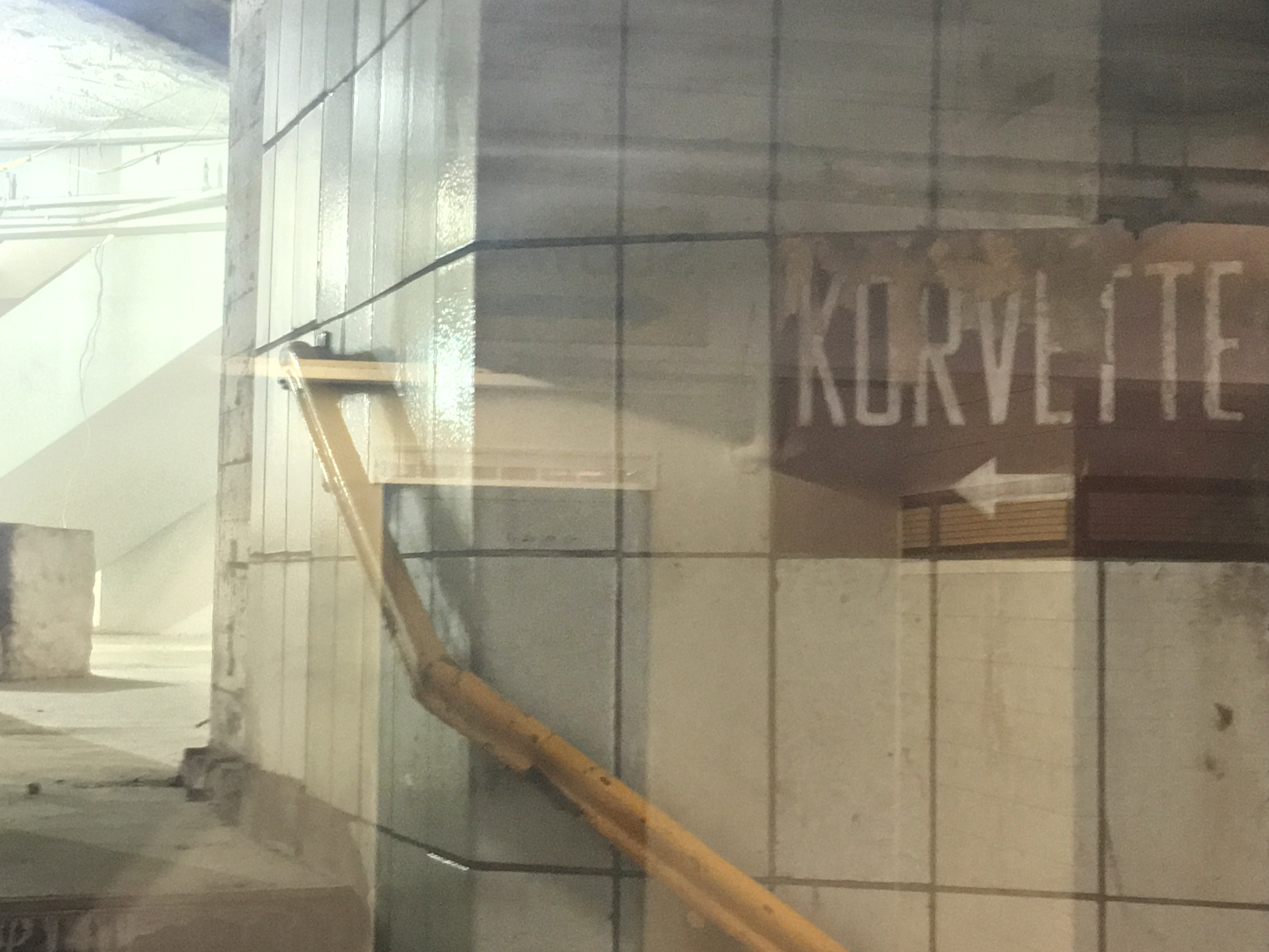
An E.J. Korvette entrance from the tunnel connecting the 33rd Street PATH station and the entrance to the 34th St-Herald Square subway station.

The company used several retailing innovations to propel its rapid growth. It used discounting, even though most discounting was known to be outlawed at the time. Korvette's instituted a membership program, a technique from consumers' cooperatives that had never been applied to a department store before. It also expanded into suburban locations at a time when most department stores were in central business districts.

The record and audio division became an important part of the profits of Korvette's. In 1964, record sales reached $20,000,000 with David Rothfeld, merchandise manager for records, books and audio equipment described "as hard-hitting as the rest of the young driving force behind Korvette, right up to the company's 37-year-old President, Jack Schwadron".

1948-1959 logo

=== Discounting and membership program ===
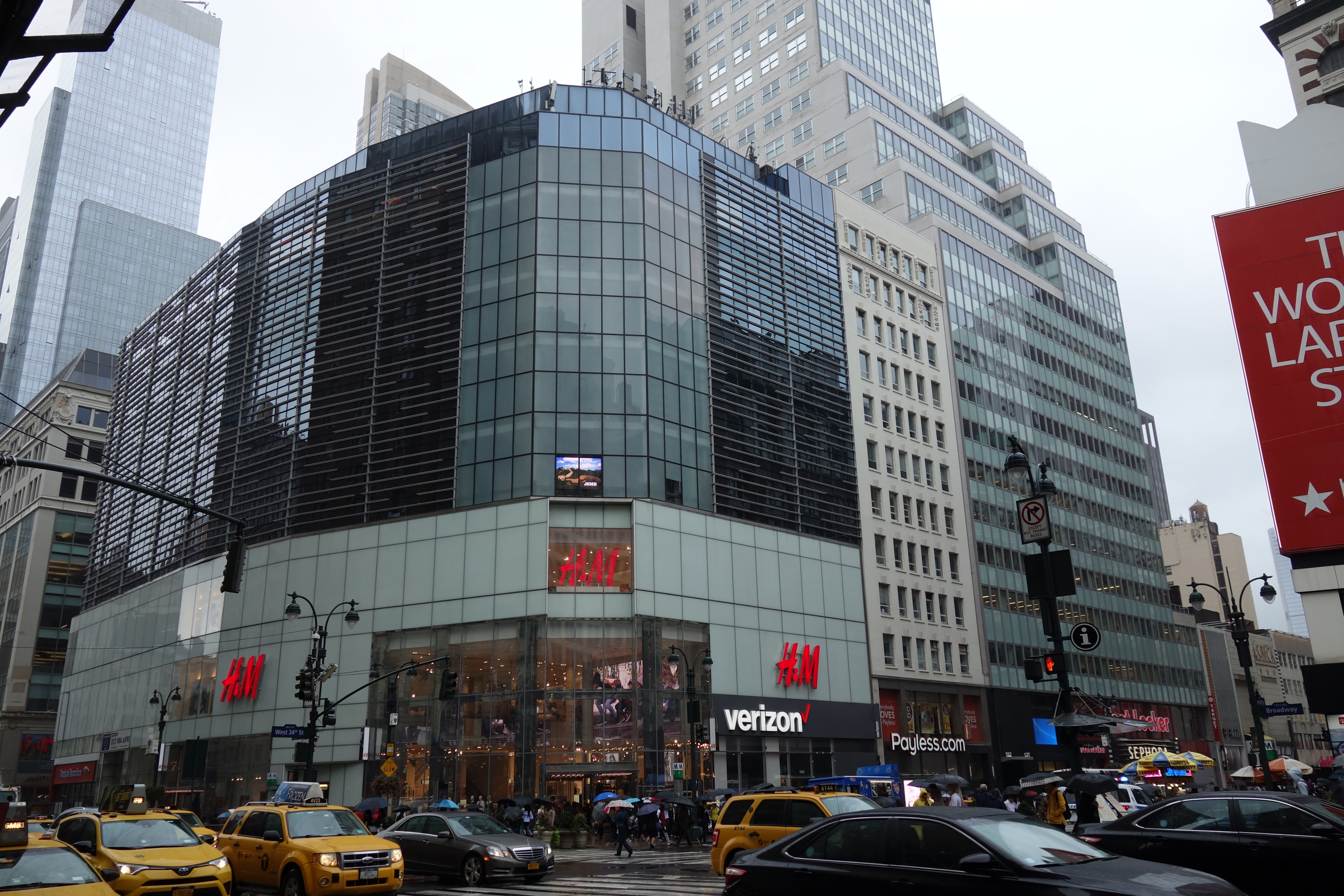
The E.J. Korvette flagship store on Herald Square was remodeled into a shopping mall in the 1980s, Herald Center.

Korvette's low-price, low-service model was in some ways similar to that of earlier five and dime retailers such as Woolworth's, McCrory's, and S.S. Kresge. But Korvette's was innovative in avoiding the anti-discounting provisions of the Robinson-Patman Act, and undercutting the suggested retail price on such expensive items as appliances and luxury pens.

Korvette used "membership cards" (which it distributed in front of its stores and to surrounding offices) to style itself as a retail cooperative. In doing so, Korvette's was able to accept deep discounts from suppliers, something that competing department stores, such as Macy's and Gimbels, could not do. In fact, Macy's and others filed numerous "fair trade" lawsuits against Korvette's to stop it from undercutting their prices. None succeeded. The lawsuits helped Korvette's by calling attention to prices so low that competitors thought them illegal.

Founder Eugene Ferkauf attributed his idea for membership cards and deep discounts to luggage wholesaler Chas. W. Wolf. But where Chas. W. Wolf made limited or even surreptitious use of these devices, Korvette's popularized them by instructing employees to distribute membership cards to any person entering any Korvette's.

=== Strip malls and the suburbs ===
While the first E.J. Korvette store was located between Third and Lexington Avenues on 45th Street in Manhattan, its rapid growth in the 1950s was helped by its many stores in strip malls along arterial roads leading out of urban centers. This made E.J. Korvette ideally situated to meet the demands of the suburbs, which grew in the United States during that era.

The first of the modern-type stores was opened in 1954, a 90,000-square-foot (8,400 m^{2}) store in Carle Place on Long Island, which for the first time carried apparel. In 1956, Korvette's had six stores, including stores in Philadelphia and Harrisburg, Pennsylvania. By 1958, it had 12 stores. At its peak, it had 58 stores.

A Korvette retail floor had cashiers located in individual departments, without a central checkout area. Large stores included a full supermarket, pharmacy, pet store, and tire center.

Korvette's opened a new flagship store, their 45th location, in November 1967. The store was located in the former Saks-34th Street store, on Herald Square, which closed in 1965 and was renovated at a cost of $1.5 million.

Korvette's expanded into the Chicago, Northern Virginia, Detroit, Baltimore, and St. Louis areas in the 1960s. It successfully disputed the state and local Sunday closing ordinances and laws after a December 20, 1976 internal financial feasibility study created by this contributor, then an employee. [A copy of that study is still extant in paper form which is available for review, independent confirmation, and study.] Once those barriers were broken, many other retailers opened on Sunday.

== Decline and closure ==
Korvette's decline and closure are variously attributed to inconsistent management, failure to focus on merchandise it knew (such as appliances), and ultimately attempting to compete directly with the department stores in areas such as fashion, despite having neither the expertise nor the right store atmosphere for that.

In February 1961, Eugene Ferkauf brought Jack Schwadron in from Alexander's Department Stores as general merchandise manager of ready-to-wear. Schwadron was elected vice president and named president of Korvette's in 1964.

Upon becoming president of Korvette, Schwadron is quoted saying: "When we went first to Detroit, people thought you spelled our name with a 'C' and we were something you drive. But after 90 days, our customers—and our competitors—knew exactly who we were" and "Our profitability has been hampered by the rapidity with which we have opened new stores...But we have finally been able to build the kind of base from which we can develop profitably into a nationwide company."

Of note was E. J. Korvette's venture into the home entertainment business. The retailer established a rather out-of-context series of high-end audio salons within selected stores. Korvettes went so far as to market its own "XAM" brand of stereo receivers, amplifiers (some manufactured by Harman Kardon and Roland), television sets, and speakers. (XAM was rumored to be a tribute to the owner's deceased dog, Max.)

In June 1965, Schwadron resigned over policy differences, including opposing philosophies on merchandising, methods of advertising and public relations, among others.

In late 1965, Korvette's formed its own home furnishings division and ceased subcontracting furniture and carpet sales. A complex warehousing and distribution network was established. A central distribution warehouse was established in Danville, Virginia. This location received furniture, purchased by its buyers located in East Paterson, New Jersey, and in turn reshipped individual customer orders based on promised delivery dates. The sold merchandise was then shipped to delivery warehouses in East Paterson and Pennsauken, New Jersey, and Jessup, Maryland, for final preparation and delivery. The furniture distribution group was active until it closed at the end of 1977.

By 1966, Korvette's had begun to decline and chose to merge with Spartan Industries, a soft goods retailer. Eugene Ferkauf was eased out of the company leadership, and Spartan managers attempted to revive the company.

From 1971 to 1979, Korvette's was owned by Arlen Realty and Development Corporation, a land development company that used Korvette's fifty stores as a source of cash flow. During this period, New York area Korvette's stores advertised heavily on local television, using game show host Bill Cullen as a spokesman.

In 1979, Korvette's was purchased by the Agache-Willot Group of France, which initially closed Korvette's least profitable stores and began selling off merchandise, fixtures, equipment, and real estate. In 1980, they declared bankruptcy, and on December 24, 1980, they closed all seventeen remaining stores.

== Name origins ==
According to Korvette's founder, Eugene Ferkauf, who died on June 5, 2012, the name "E. J. Korvette" was coined as a combination of the initials of its founders (Eugene and Joe) and a re-spelling of the naval term corvette, a nimble sailing warship and later World War II sub-destroyer. The company's founding in 1948 (two years before the Korean War) disproves the urban legend that the name was an acronym for "Eight (or Eleven) Jewish Korean War Veterans". Founders Ferkauf and Zwillenberg, however, were Jewish.

=== Korvette name in Canada ===
In the absence of the U.S. Korvette chain in Canada, a discount store chain was launched in Quebec in 1958 using the name "Korvette Stores Limited" (now "Les Magasins Korvette Ltée") without any affiliation to the American company. The chain still exists today and operates 71 discount stores as of May 2015.

== See also ==
- Metric Hosiery Company, a company that went out of business due to Korvette
