= Vornado Realty Trust =

American real estate investment trust

- Type: Public
- Traded as: NYSE: VNO; S&P 400 component
- Industry: Real estate investment trust
- Founded: 1982; 44 years ago in Maryland, U.S.
- Headquarters: New York City, U.S.
- Key people: Steven Roth (chairman & CEO); Michael J. Franco (CFO)
- Products: Office buildings
- Revenue: ▲US$1.81 billion (2025)
- Net income: ▲US$905 million (2025)
- Total assets: ▼US$15.5 billion (2025)
- Total equity: ▲US$5.99 billion (2025)
- Number of employees: 2,996 (2024)
- Website: vno.com

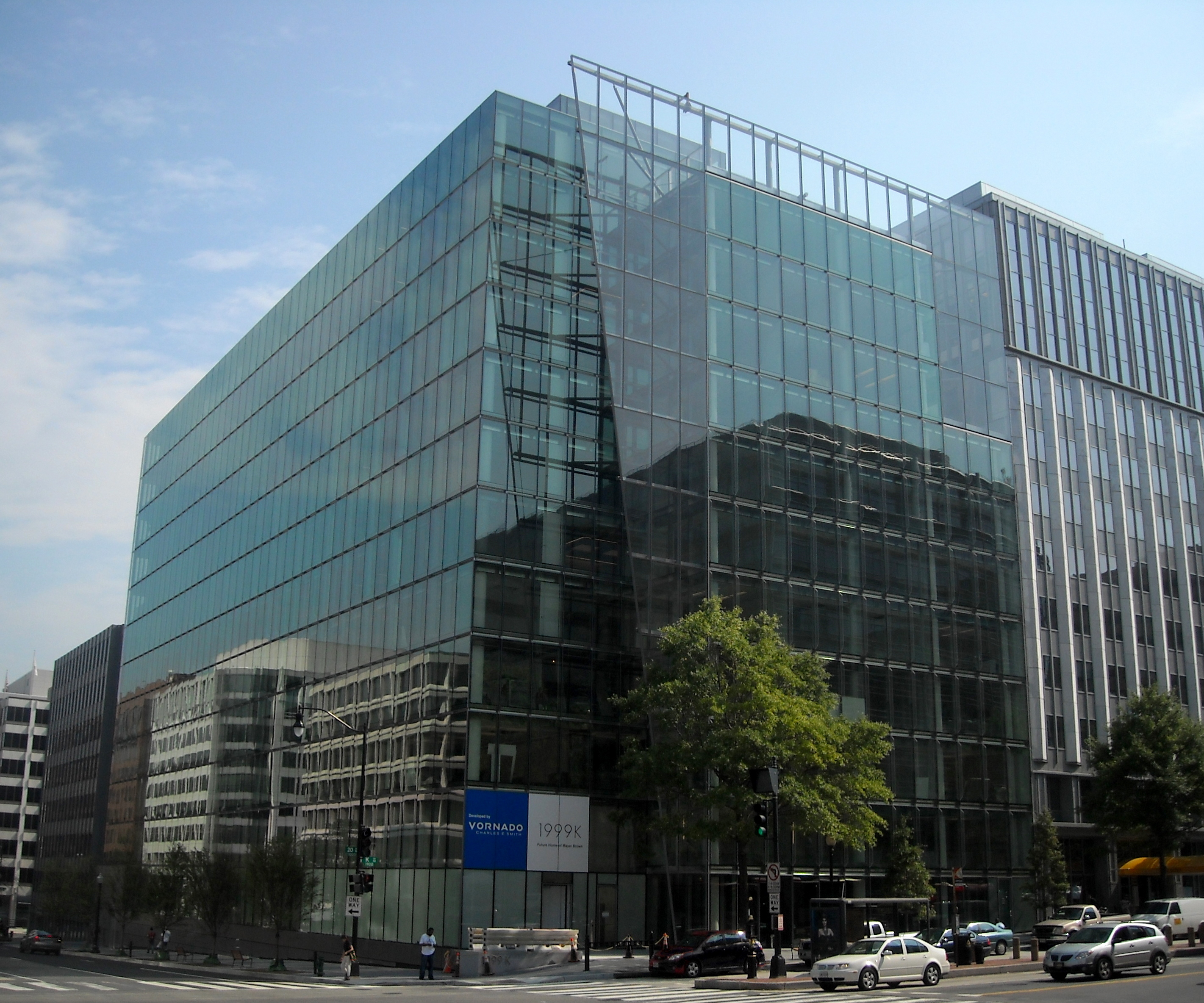
1999 K Street NW in Washington, D.C. was developed by Vornado Realty Trust and sold for $208M in 2009. It was designed by architect Helmut Jahn.

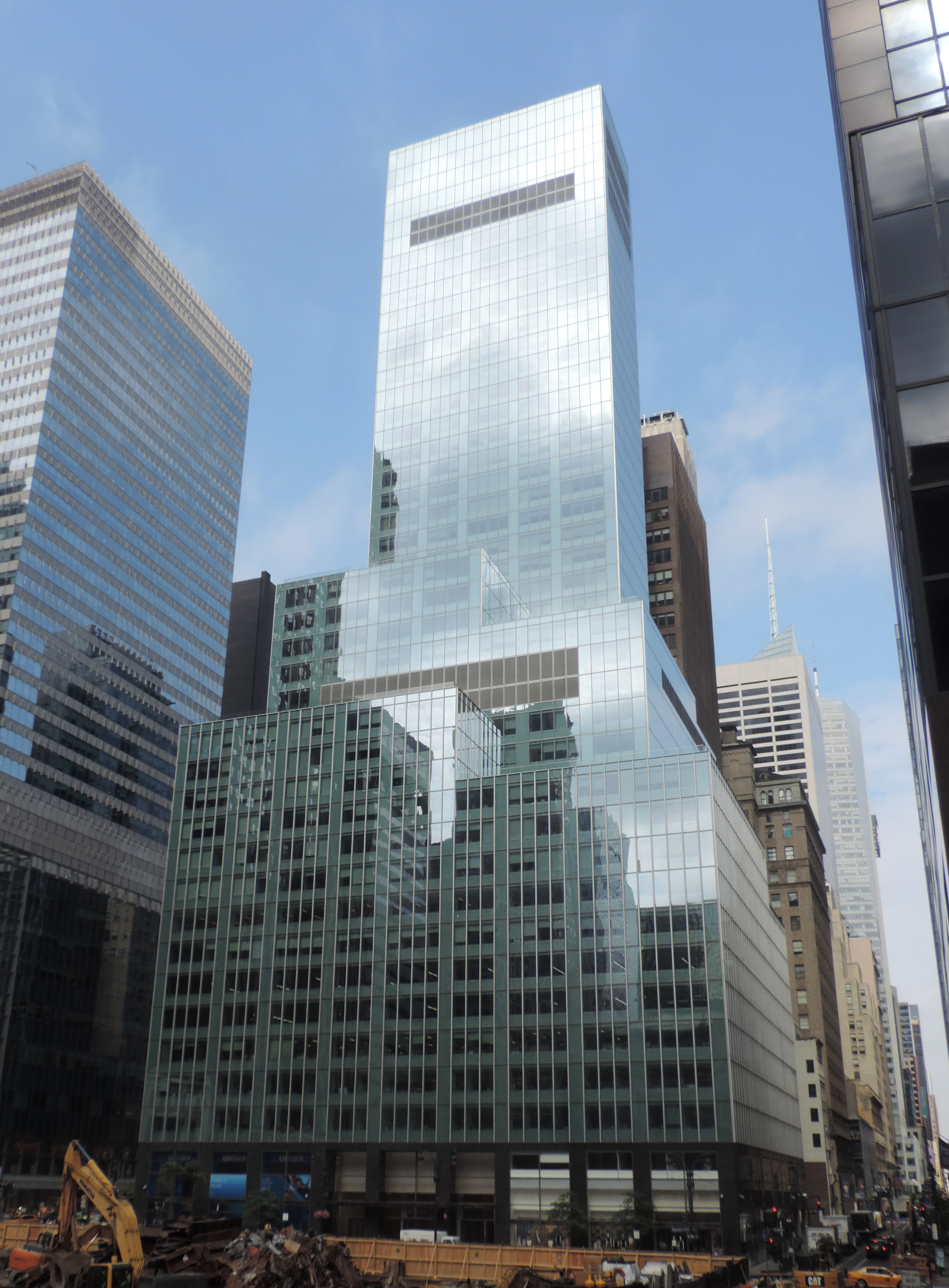
330 Madison Avenue, owned by Vornado

Vornado Realty Trust is an American real estate investment trust formed in Maryland in 1982, with its primary office in New York City. The company invests in office buildings and street retail in Manhattan.

== History ==
The origins of the company can be traced back to the Two Guys discount store chain, founded in 1947 by brothers Sidney and Herbert Hubschman. In 1959, Two Guys acquired O. A. Sutton Corporation, manufacturers of the Vornado line of electric fans, and the company was renamed Vornado Inc. By 1964, the company operated over 200 stores. In the 1970s, Vornado began divesting its retail operations. In 1978, the company sold 80 Two Guys locations in California.

In 1980, Interstate Properties, a real estate development company controlled by Steven Roth, acquired an 18% stake in Vornado due to its real estate holdings. In 1981, Interstate Properties took control of the firm after winning a proxy fight against existing management and reduced the number of stores in operation to 12.

In 1986, Interstate Properties and Donald Trump each bought approximately 20% of Alexander's, a failing retailer whose real estate holdings included a store that occupied the entire block between East 58th and 59th streets and Lexington and Third Avenues in Manhattan. In 1988, they each raised their stakes to 27% of the company, but Trump pledged his interest as collateral for a personal loan from Citicorp and in 1991, Trump was forced to turn over his holdings to Citibank. In 1992, Roth and Alexander's creditors forced Alexander's into bankruptcy and all 11 of its stores were shut. Alexander's emerged from bankruptcy in 1993 as a real estate investment trust. That same year, Vornado Inc. was converted into a REIT, Vornado Realty Trust. In 1995, Vornado bought Citicorp's interest in Alexander's.

In 1989, the Vornado name was licensed to Vornado Air, a new company formed to manufacture heating and cooling equipment. In April 1997, the company acquired a portfolio of office buildings in Manhattan from Bernard H. Mendik in a $654 million stock transaction. Mendik became co-chairman of Vornado until his resignation in October 1998.

In February 2001, Vornado Realty Trust won the bid for a 99-year lease for the World Trade Center, offering $3.25 billion. Silverstein Properties was outbid by $30 million by Vornado. However, Vornado balked over lease terms and possible tax liabilities. Silverstein signed a lease for the World Trade Center in April 2001, five months before the September 11 attacks. In October 2001, the company acquired Charles E. Smith Commercial Realty, owner of assets primarily in Arlington, Virginia, in a $1.58 billion transaction. Robert H. Smith and Robert P. Kogod were added to the board of directors of Vornado.

In 2005, the company bought a 32.5% interest in Toys "R" Us. Toys "R" Us filed bankruptcy in 2018 and the investment was written off. In 2013, Steven Roth replaced Michael D. Fascitelli as CEO of Vornado. Fascitelli had been CEO since 2009. In 2015, the company completed the corporate spin-off of its interest in Urban Edge Properties, owner of retail holdings outside Manhattan. In 2017, the company merged its Charles E. Smith Companies subsidiary into the JBG Companies, forming JBG Smith.

== Investments ==
Notable properties owned by the company include:

- New York Marriott Marquis (Retail & signage)
- 1540 Broadway (Retail & signage)
- Manufacturers Trust Company Building (510 Fifth Avenue) (Retail)
- 660 Fifth Avenue (Retail)
- 770 Broadway
- 888 Seventh Avenue
- Crowne Plaza Times Square Manhattan (Retail & office)
- Fuller Building
- Penn 1
- The future site of 15 Penn Plaza
- Rego Center
- 350 Park Avenue

The company also owns:

- 70% of 555 California Street in San Francisco, California (30% is owned by affiliates of Donald Trump)
- 70% of 1290 Avenue of the Americas in New York City (30% is owned by Donald Trump)
- Merchandise Mart in Chicago, Illinois
- 32.4% of Alexander's, which owns 731 Lexington Avenue
