= 647 Fifth Avenue =

Commercial building in Manhattan, New York

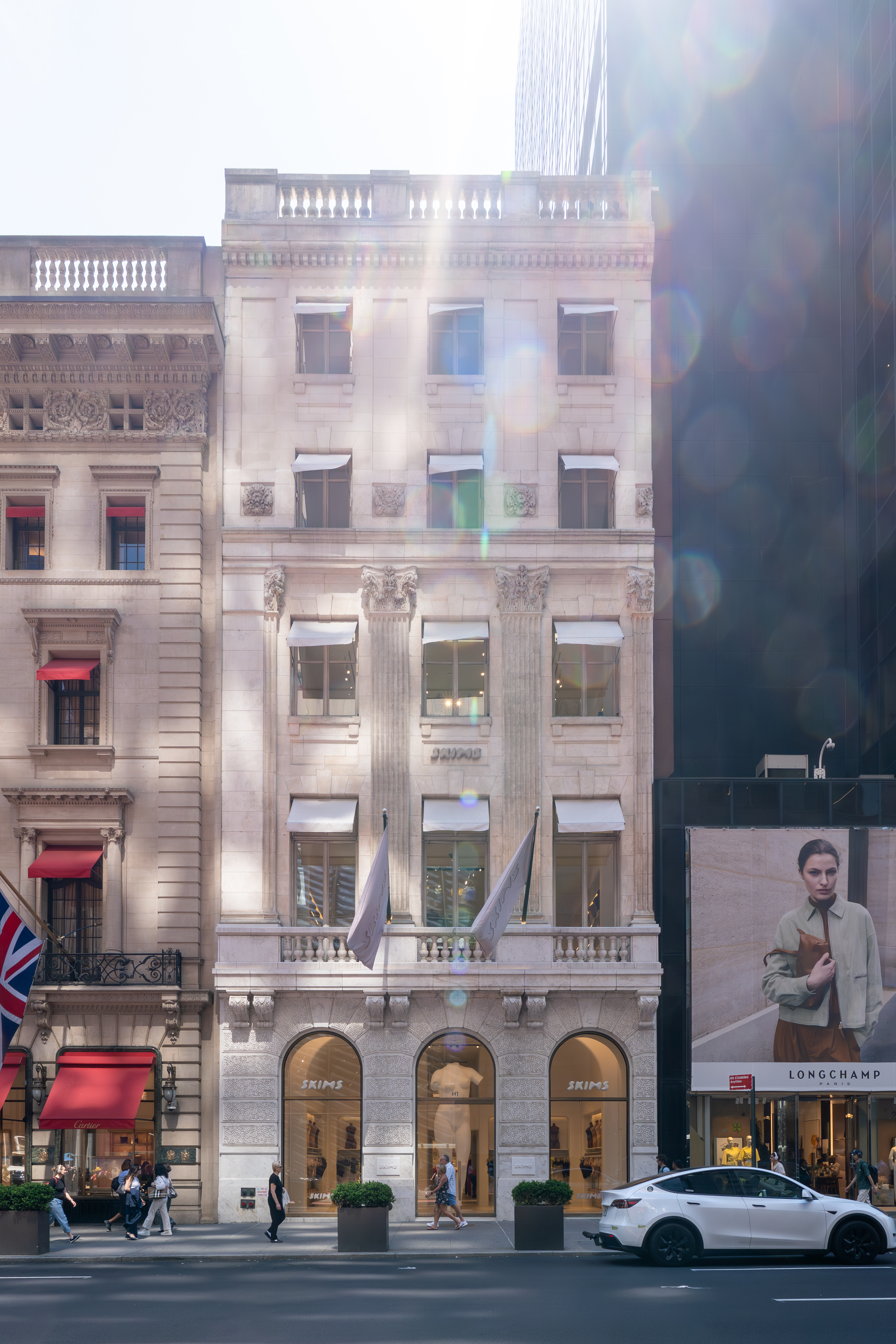
- (2026)
- Interactive map of the 647 Fifth Avenue area
- Former names: George W. Vanderbilt Residence

General information
- Architectural style: Neoclassical
- Location: Manhattan, New York
- Coordinates: 40°45′34″N 73°58′34″W
- Current tenants: Skims
- Opened: 1905
- Renovated: 1938; 1995–1996
- Client: George W. Vanderbilt

Technical details
- Floor count: 6

Design and construction
- Architect: Hunt & Hunt

Renovating team
- Architects: Francisque Verpilleux (1938); Laboratio Associati (1995–1996)

New York City Landmark
- Designated: March 22, 1977
- Reference no.: 0954
- Designated entity: 647 Fifth Avenue

U.S. National Register of Historic Places
- Designated: September 8, 1983
- Reference no.: 83001733
- Designated entity: Houses at 647, 651–53 Fifth Avenue and 4 East 52nd Street

647 Fifth Avenue, originally known as the George W. Vanderbilt Residence, is a commercial building in the Midtown Manhattan neighborhood of New York City. It is along the east side of Fifth Avenue between 51st Street and 52nd Street. The building was designed by Hunt & Hunt as one of the "Marble Twins", a pair of houses at 645 and 647 Fifth Avenue. The houses were constructed between 1902 and 1905 as Vanderbilt family residences. Number 645 was occupied by William B. Osgood Field (husband of Lila Vanderbilt Sloane), while number 647 was owned by George W. Vanderbilt and rented to Robert Wilson Goelet; both were part of the Vanderbilt family by marriage.

The house is a six-story stone building in the French Renaissance Revival style. The first floor has arched openings topped by a balustrade, while the second and third stories contain fluted pilasters supporting an entablature. The fourth and fifth floors were added in the late 1930s in an imitation of the original design, and a balustrade runs above the fifth story. The adjoining townhouse at 645 Fifth Avenue, demolished in 1944, had been built in a similar style. The entire building is taken up by a store for fashion company Versace, which also built a sixth-story fitting room.

The southeast corner of Fifth Avenue and 52nd Street was planned as a hotel in the early 1900s after the Roman Catholic Asylum vacated the site. After the Vanderbilts blocked the development of the hotel, the southern portion of the site was developed as the Marble Twins, while the northern portion became the Morton F. Plant House (now the Cartier Building). Number 647 was altered for commercial use after 1916 and contained an art gallery and airline ticket agent, among other tenants. Number 645 was largely residential until it was torn down. The New York City Landmarks Preservation Commission designated 647 Fifth Avenue as a city landmark in 1977, and it was added to the National Register of Historic Places in 1983 along with the Cartier Building. In the late 1990s, Versace remodeled 647 Fifth Avenue.

== Site ==
647 Fifth Avenue is in the Midtown Manhattan neighborhood of New York City. It is along the east side of Fifth Avenue between 51st Street and 52nd Street. The land lot is rectangular and covers 3,750 square feet (348 m^{2}), with a frontage of 37.5 feet (11.4 m) and a depth of 100 feet (30 m). The building is on the same block as the Cartier Building on 651 Fifth Avenue to the north, the Olympic Tower to the south, and 11 East 51st Street and 488 Madison Avenue to the east. Other nearby buildings include 650 Fifth Avenue to the west, 660 Fifth Avenue to the northwest, Austrian Cultural Forum New York to the north, 12 East 53rd Street and Omni Berkshire Place to the northeast, St. Patrick's Cathedral to the south, and the International Building of Rockefeller Center to the southwest.

Fifth Avenue between 42nd Street and Central Park South (59th Street) was relatively undeveloped through the late 19th century. The surrounding area was once part of the common lands of the city of New York. The Commissioners' Plan of 1811 established Manhattan's street grid with lots measuring 100 feet (30 m) deep and 25 feet (7.6 m) wide. Upscale residences were constructed around Fifth Avenue following the American Civil War. In 1882, three Vanderbilt family residences were completed along Fifth Avenue between 51st and 59th Streets (the William H., William K., and Cornelius II mansions). The surrounding section of Fifth Avenue thus became known as "Vanderbilt Row". By the early 1900s, that section of Fifth Avenue was becoming a commercial area.

The site immediately north of St. Patrick's Cathedral was owned by the Roman Catholic Archdiocese of New York, which used the site for the Roman Catholic Asylum. The asylum took up two blocks between 51st Street, 52nd Street, Fifth Avenue, and Park Avenue. It was once one of several public institutions on the midtown section of Fifth Avenue, but by the end of the 19th century, it was the only one remaining. The Roman Catholic Asylum site was placed for sale in 1899 after the institution had secured another site in the Bronx.

== Architecture ==
647 Fifth Avenue is the surviving northern half of the "Marble Twins", a pair of residences erected simultaneously at 645–647 Fifth Avenue. The southern half, at number 645, was replaced by a Best & Co. store and then the Olympic Tower in the mid-20th century. Both houses were designed by Hunt & Hunt in the French Renaissance Revival style. They were constructed by D. C. Weeks & Son. Number 647 is the only remaining Vanderbilt family residence on Fifth Avenue south of Central Park.

=== Facade ===
647 Fifth Avenue is six stories high. The facade along Fifth Avenue is five stories high and consists of three vertical bays, while the sixth story is recessed on the roof. As originally designed, 645 and 647 Fifth Avenue were both four stories high and contained six bays between them.

The first floor was designed as an English basement. Initially, the houses had round-arched windows separated by rusticated and vermiculated limestone blocks. There were consoles on top of each set of rusticated and vermiculated blocks, which supported the second-story balconies. The entrances to the respective houses were via short stoops on the extreme ends of either house, with number 645's entrance on the far right (south) and number 647's entrance on the far left (north). The openings on the first story of number 647 were enlarged in 1916, and the ground-floor facade was totally rebuilt in 1937. The later design had plate-glass doors on either side of a display window. In the late 1990s, the first floor was rebuilt with vermiculated blocks and arched openings similar to the originals.

The second and third floors are mostly unchanged from the original design. While the balcony was originally made of stone balusters, this was removed in 1937 and replaced with a cast-iron balustrade. The original design of the Marble Twins contained five pilasters, each of which was fluted and was topped by an elaborate capital. These pilasters separated each of the six windows on both stories and were flanked on the extreme ends by broad piers, which each contained a narrow section of another pilaster. The northern pier and the northernmost two and a half pilasters remain intact. The windows on the second and third floors both contain splayed lintels and recessed panels above them. The second-story windows open onto the balcony while the third-story windows contain window sills above corbel blocks.

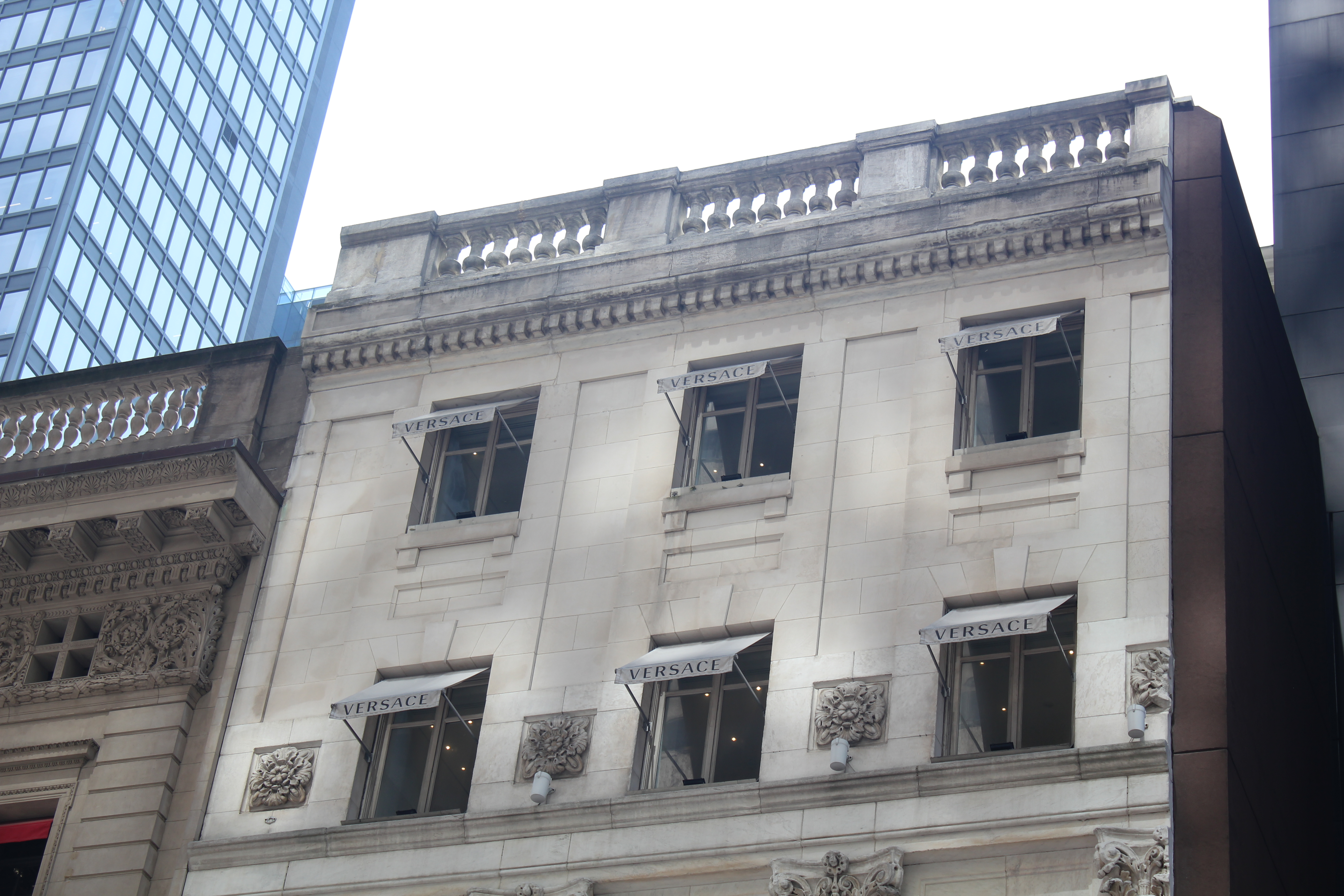
Upper floors, remodeled in the late 1930s

Originally, 645 and 647 Fifth Avenue were only four stories high. The fourth story consisted of recessed square windows set between carved stone rosettes. Above the windows was a band of dentils, followed by a deep cornice and a balustrade supported by brackets. The modern design of number 647's fourth and fifth stories dates to an alteration in the late 1930s. The fourth-floor windows and rosettes were left in place, but the heavy bracketed cornice was removed. A set of stone panels was installed above the rosettes and the new fifth-story windows were designed similarly to the fourth-story windows. The band of dentils and the balustrade were relocated to the top of the fifth story rather than being destroyed.

=== Features ===
The original design had a curving stairway separating the south side of number 647 and the north side of number 645, but this was demolished in the mid-20th century. When number 647 became an art dealership in 1917, an oeil-de-boeuf was installed above a door on the first floor. That door separated a portrait hall in the front, with gray-marble walls, and a sculpture gallery in the rear, with red-damask walls. In 1938, number 647 was converted into a wholly commercial building, and some of the interior columns were removed. The first floor was turned into a retail space with a ceiling height of 20.67 feet (6.30 m), including a central mezzanine 11.75 feet (3.58 m) above the ground level. A freight elevator was installed, connecting the storage basement and the five above-ground stories. The upper floors had ceiling heights ranging from 17.83 feet (5.43 m) on the second floor to 11.67 feet (3.56 m) on the fourth floor.

In the late 1960s, the interior was redecorated for Olympic Airlines, the Greek national airline. The first story had marble walls and hardwood floors and was decorated with two tile mosaics. One of the mosaics depicted Phaethon, the son of the Greek god Helios, while the other mosaic depicted the sun shining on an island village in the Aegean Sea. The second story had the airline's reservations area, which displayed flight information, as well as an 80-seat showroom that demonstrated in-flight travel equipment. The third floor housed the airline's personnel, while the fourth and fifth floors had communications machinery and general offices.

When the building was renovated for fashion company Versace in the late 1990s, the stairway on the south side of 647 Fifth Avenue was restored. The staircase consists of a marble set of stairs with a bronze balustrade, lit by a skylight on the roof. The interiors were also inlaid with terrazzo floors and, on the fifth story, the home furnishings department received a wooden floor. In addition, a sixth floor with a rooftop garden and cafe was added. A private boutique, a terrace on Fifth Avenue, and skylights and balconies were also installed on the roof. The private boutique was intended as a VIP fitting room and could only be reached by turning a key in the elevator.

== History ==
In October 1899, the Roman Catholic Asylum sold much of the city block bounded clockwise from west by Fifth Avenue, 52nd Street, Madison Avenue, and 51st Street. The sale was valued at $2.5 million and included the lots on the east side of Fifth Avenue between 51st and 52nd Streets, as well as those on the side streets. George R. Sheldon and Charles T. Barney were reported as the purchasers. In the subsequent months, many of the lots along 51st and 52nd Streets were sold to families, though one lot was sold to the Union Club of the City of New York. The single-family lots were sold under the stipulation that they would remain in residential use for 25 years. By May 1900, only the lots along Fifth Avenue remained unsold.

=== Residential use ===
==== Construction ====
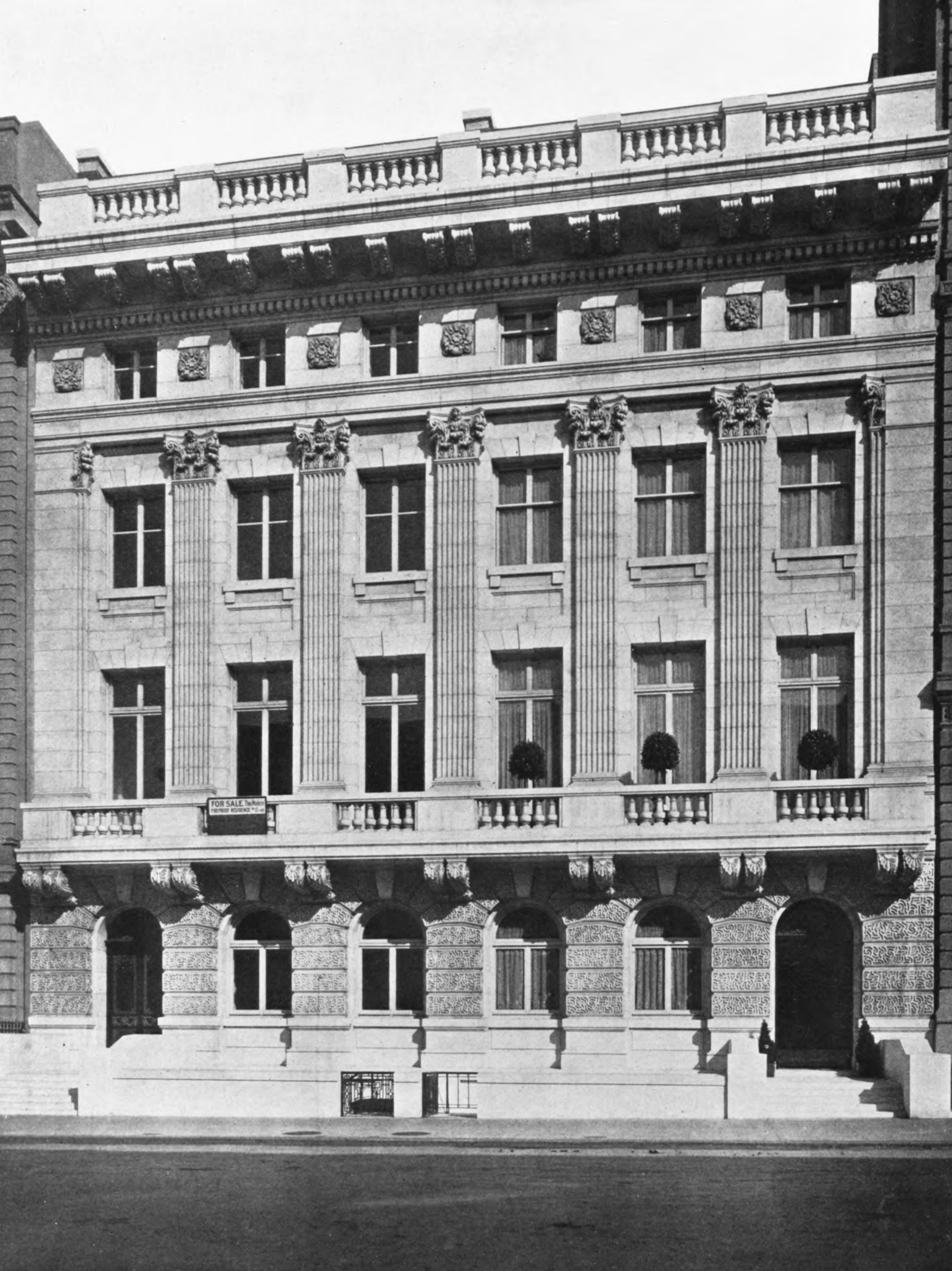
Original Marble Twins

A group of developers led by Stewart H. Chisholm bought the southeast corner lot at 52nd Street and Fifth Avenue, measuring 100 by 125 feet (30 by 38 m), from Flake & Dowling in early 1901. That October, Chisholm's syndicate filed plans for an 18-story apartment hotel, designed by William C. Hazlett, to be built on that site. In March 1902, after the corner site had been excavated, Chisholm sold the site to the New York Realty Corporation. The Real Estate Record and Guide described the sale as "a peculiar transaction, and one which can hardly be called a sale". The corporation was acting on behalf of the Vanderbilt family, which did not want to see a high-rise hotel development opposite their houses. The Vanderbilts sold the northern section of the plot, facing 52nd Street and measuring 50 by 100 feet (15 by 30 m), to financier Morton F. Plant. However, they were unable to obtain a buyer for the southern section, which was in the middle of a city block.

In September 1902, George W. Vanderbilt announced plans for marble townhouses at 645 and 647 Fifth Avenue on the southern section of the site, measuring 75 by 100 feet (23 by 30 m). At that point, the Vanderbilt family was confirmed to be associated with the New York Realty Corporation. That month, Hunt & Hunt filed plans for the houses with the New York City Department of Buildings, which were to cost $100,000. A general contract was awarded to D. C. Weeks & Son. The residences were designed as a double house with identical architectural features. Vanderbilt sold the southern house, number 645, for $500,000 in July 1904. The buyers were George's sister Emily and her husband William Douglas Sloane. By April 1905, number 645 was already occupied and number 647 was nearly finished. The Real Estate Record and Guide said that the Vanderbilt houses would "will long act as an absolute barrier" against further business development on Fifth Avenue above 50th Street.

==== Occupancy ====
Emily and William Sloane did not live in number 645; they instead rented it to their daughter Lila Field and son-in-law William B. Osgood Field. Neither did George Vanderbilt live in number 647, for he had sold it to his brother William K. Vanderbilt in 1904. William was the sole owner of 647 Fifth Avenue after that date, according to a deed filed in 1915, following William's death. An image from 1905 indicated that number 647 still had a "for sale" sign in front of it. In March 1907, Sloane was recorded as having leased number 647 for several years. Robert Wilson Goelet and his wife Elsie Whelen moved into number 647 at the end of that year. The Goelets lived there with their son Ogden, as well as fourteen servants. The Goelet family was the only residential occupants of number 647. The Goelet home was used for events: in 1910, they hosted a sixty-person dinner and a George Bernard Shaw play, and in 1912, they held an "Oriental"-themed party.

Fifth Avenue was widened in 1911, and the marble steps in front of Goelet's and Field's houses had to be cut back. Hunt & Hunt was hired to perform the alterations. Around that time, the neighborhood was growing increasingly commercial. In January 1914, Elsie Goelet filed for divorce from Robert; most of the servants were dismissed and both Goelets left the house for good. Morton Plant's adjacent house was leased in October 1916 to Cartier, and number 647 was leased to art dealers Rene Gimpel and Nathan Wildenstein the following month. According to the Real Estate Record and Guide, these sales marked "another step in the transition of this section of Fifth avenue from the residential to the business stage". The Fields continued to live in number 645 for several years. In 1929, William and Lila's son Frederick Vanderbilt Field was married to Elizabeth G. Brown at the Field residence.

=== Commercial use ===
==== 1920s to 1940s ====
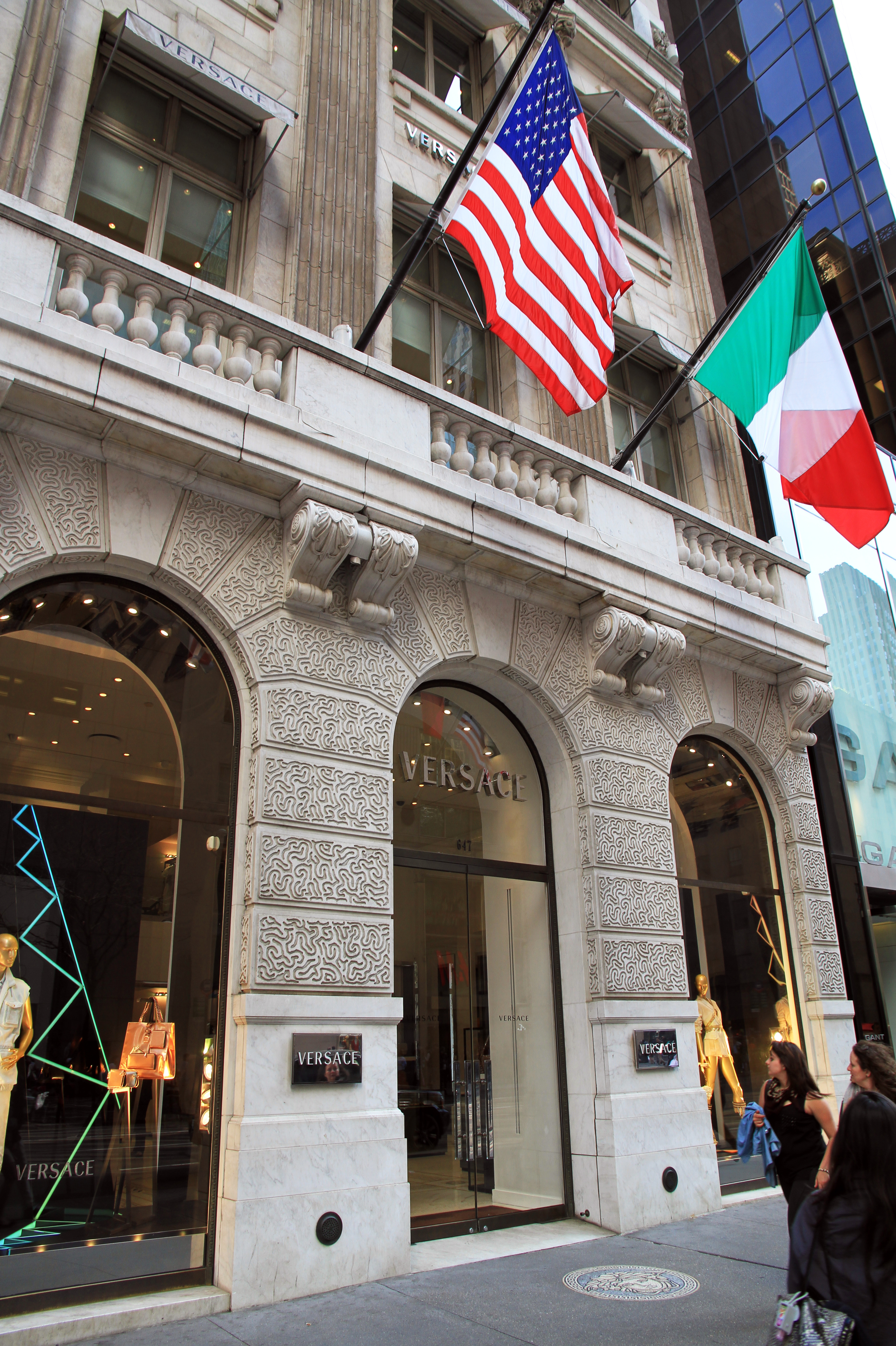
The base of 647 Fifth Avenue after it was remodeled by Versace

Gimpel & Wildenstein (later Wildenstein & Co.) designed a fifth story for number 647 in 1917, with J. H, Deeves & Brother as general contractors. The renovation did not significantly change the house's exterior design, although the interior was remodeled. Gimpel & Wildenstein's new galleries opened in May 1917. William K. Vanderbilt was recorded in 1920 as conveying title to 647 Fifth Avenue to Harold S. Vanderbilt and Malcolm D. Sloane. Number 647 was sold to Hoagland Corporation in May 1923 at an assessed valuation of $750,000. The house was further sold to Felix Wildenstein, who owned Wildenstein & Co., in 1925. Architect Eliot Cross bought number 647 in March 1928. Two months later, Cartier bought number 647 for investment. As a term of the sale, Wildenstein & Co. would be allowed to remain in the house until 1932, after which Cartier planned to either renovate or replace the building with a commercial structure. Wildenstein & Co. moved out of number 647 after purchasing another site in 1931 and developing a new building.

In 1937, Wallace K. Harrison and J. André Fouilhoux filed plans for a renovation of the facade, a new mezzanine, and new elevators to cost $125,000. Late the following year, Francisque Verpilleux was hired to design a renovation of number 647, while Charles H. Tyler was hired as general contractor. As part of the project, the floors were redesigned as spaces without columns, and elevators, air-conditioning, and sprinklers were installed. A shipping dock was also installed in the building's rear, extending to 52nd Street. After the renovation, the American Express Company leased space in June 1939 and opened its offices that October, taking up the basement through the second story. Mary Lewis opened her dress shop on the third floor of number 647 in April 1940, although the Lewis shop was only at 647 Fifth Avenue for two years. The second floor was rented to tailors James W. Bell & Co. in 1942, and costumer Harry Collins leased space at the building the same year.

The neighboring house at number 645 continued to be owned by William Osgood Field until he sold it in May 1944. By that time, it was frequently empty. The buyer was reported to be "Beatrice J. Longstreet of Manasquan, N. J.", though The New York Times speculated this was not the real buyer. 645 Fifth Avenue, along with the clubhouse of the Union Club and the residence at 3 East 51st Street to the south, were to be demolished and replaced with a taller structure. These structures were being demolished by August 1944 when a twelve-story department store was announced for that site. By that December, demolition was "virtually complete" and Best & Co. were announced as the tenants of the new structure. (Note: However, according to Gray 1995, 647 Fifth Avenue was demolished in 1945.) The Best & Co. store opened in 1947.

==== 1950s to 1980s ====
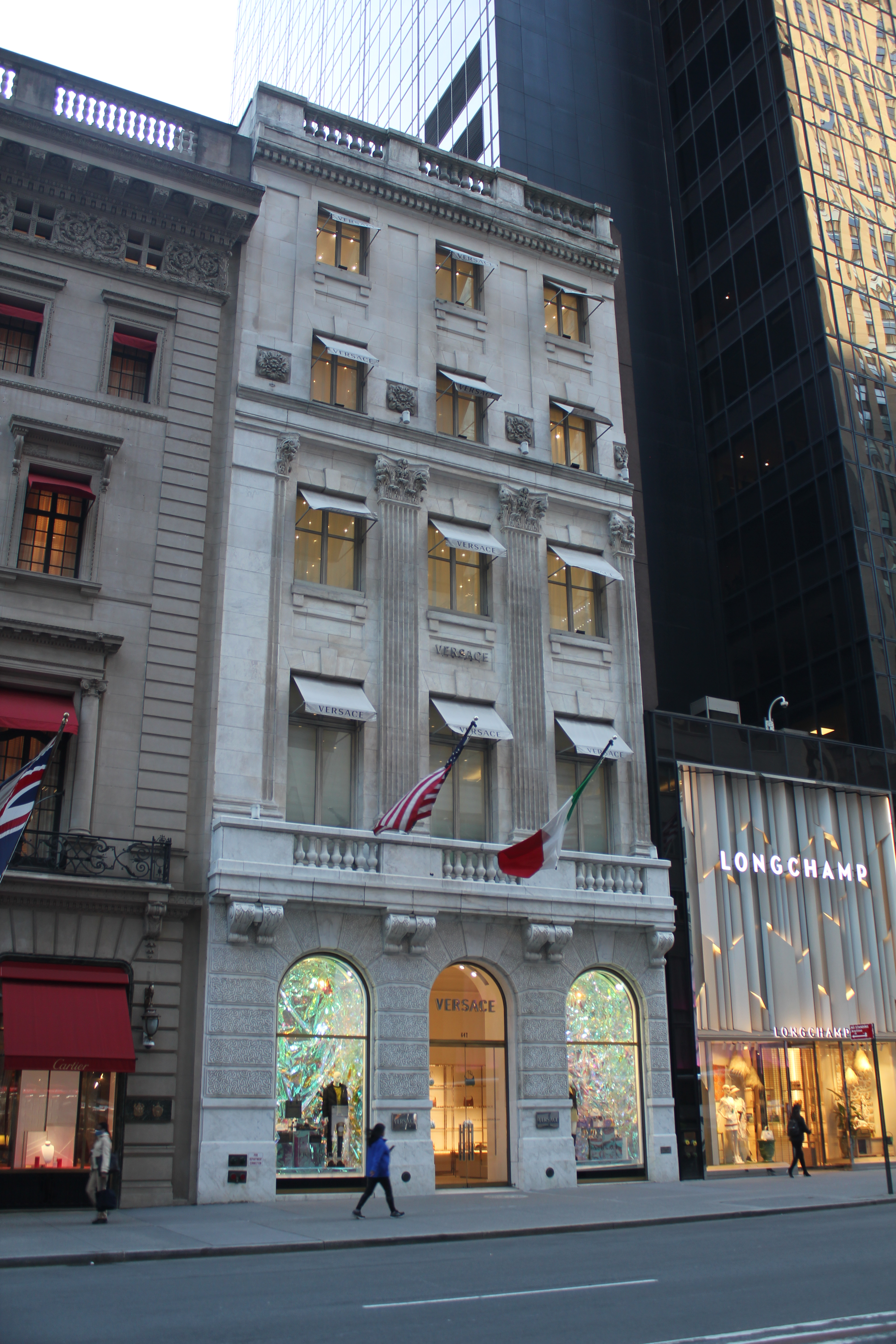
View of the house from near 52nd Street

The house at 647 Fifth Avenue, along with the neighboring properties at 653 Fifth Avenue and 4 East 52nd Street, were all acquired in May 1950 by the Phoenix Mutual Life Insurance Company. The buyer, who reportedly paid for the buildings in cash, held the properties as an investment and continued leasing 647 Fifth Avenue to American Express. American Express renovated 647 Fifth Avenue in 1958 to designs by Joseph Huston. By the early 1960s, number 647 was the only remainder of the former Vanderbilt residences on Fifth Avenue. In 1965, American Express relocated its operations to two other Midtown buildings. American Express sublet 647 Fifth Avenue to Olympic Airways, the Greek national airline, for 10 years at $1.3 million a year. The Olympic offices were opened and dedicated the next year.

In the late 1960s, Best & Co. purchased the development rights over 647 Fifth Avenue, which permitted Best's to erect a skyscraper above their store. An early plan for the skyscraper, designed by Morris Lapidus, would have resulted in the demolition of 647 Fifth Avenue, though the plans were changed in 1971 after Lapidus was fired as architect. Aristotle Onassis, the president of Olympic Airways, established a family trust called Victory Development in March 1970. Victory formed a joint venture with Arlen Realty & Development Corporation to acquire Best's store, 647 Fifth Avenue, and the Cartier Building. The Best & Co. store next door closed in late 1970 and it was demolished the next year to make way for the Olympic Tower. As part of the Olympic Tower's construction, a pedestrian plaza was built east of 647 Fifth Avenue and the Cartier Building. Olympic Airways initially intended to renovate 647 Fifth Avenue with a glass facade similar to that of the tower. Architectural critic Ada Louise Huxtable described the plan as an "undesirable change" and said the Olympic Tower's architects Skidmore, Owings & Merrill (SOM) "have obviously never heard of the Let-It-Alone Club". After Huxtable, Paul Goldberger, and other people in the architectural community objected, SOM decided to retain Hunt & Hunt's original facade on 647 Fifth Avenue. The tower was ultimately completed and dedicated in 1974.

The New York City Landmarks Preservation Commission (LPC) began considering 647 Fifth Avenue for New York City landmark status in early 1977. The building was designated as a landmark on March 22, 1977. In addition, on September 8, 1983, the George W. Vanderbilt residence at 647 Fifth Avenue was added to the National Register of Historic Places (NRHP), along with the adjacent Cartier Building at 651–653 Fifth Avenue and 4 East 52nd Street. The buildings were cited as examples of residences in Midtown Manhattan that were later converted to commercial use. The houses were added to the NRHP as a single listing, the "Houses at 647, 651-53 Fifth Avenue and 4 East 52nd Street".

==== 1990s to present ====
Olympic Airways moved out of 647 Fifth Avenue around 1993, and the building was vacant for two months. In February 1995, fashion designer Gianni Versace leased 647 Fifth Avenue for 20 years on behalf of his company. Architectural firm Laboratio Associati was hired to renovate the building. The original vermiculated base was rebuilt from Danby Vermont marble, which had been in the Italian city of Carrara. The vermiculation was reproduced using laser cutting, but the finishes were performed by hand. Rocco Magnoli and Lorenzo Carmellini, two architects with Laboratio Associati, used historic photos of the house to recreate its original appearance. The interiors were also renovated with one room per vertical bay. Versace also added a rooftop cafe and garden. The Versace store opened in October 1996 with a party attended by celebrities such as Sheryl Crow and Jon Bon Jovi. The location was meant to be Versace's flagship store.

The building was renovated for six months starting in late 2005, during which the windows were enlarged and the interiors were rearranged. The Versace store reopened in March 2006. In May 2012, real estate investment firm Crown Acquisitions took a 49.9 percent stake in the Olympic Tower properties, which included 647 Fifth Avenue, the Cartier Building, the Olympic Tower itself, and a fourth building at 10 East 52nd Street. In December 2018, Versace announced its plans to leave 647 Fifth Avenue and sublease the space. Versace's lease did not expire until December 2023, and the company, which wanted to move uptown, could not break its lease. By 2022, Versace was still located at 647 Fifth Avenue. The shapewear brand Skims leased 647 Fifth Avenue in early 2024 at a rate of less than $200 per square foot ($2,200/m^{2}), no more than a quarter of the rate that Versace had been paying for the building.

== See also ==
- List of New York City Designated Landmarks in Manhattan from 14th to 59th Streets
- National Register of Historic Places listings in Manhattan from 14th to 59th Streets
