= Edgar Department Stores =

U.S. based department store that operated in New England (1890-1989)

Edgar Department Stores was the name of a U.S. based department store that operated in New England. Originally called "The Boston Store," it was founded in Brockton, Massachusetts in 1890. After a second devastating fire in less than 20 years, James Edgar, an immigrant from Edinburgh, Scotland, bought out his partner and in a purpose-built, fire-proof building, re-opened the business as Edgar's in Brockton, Massachusetts.

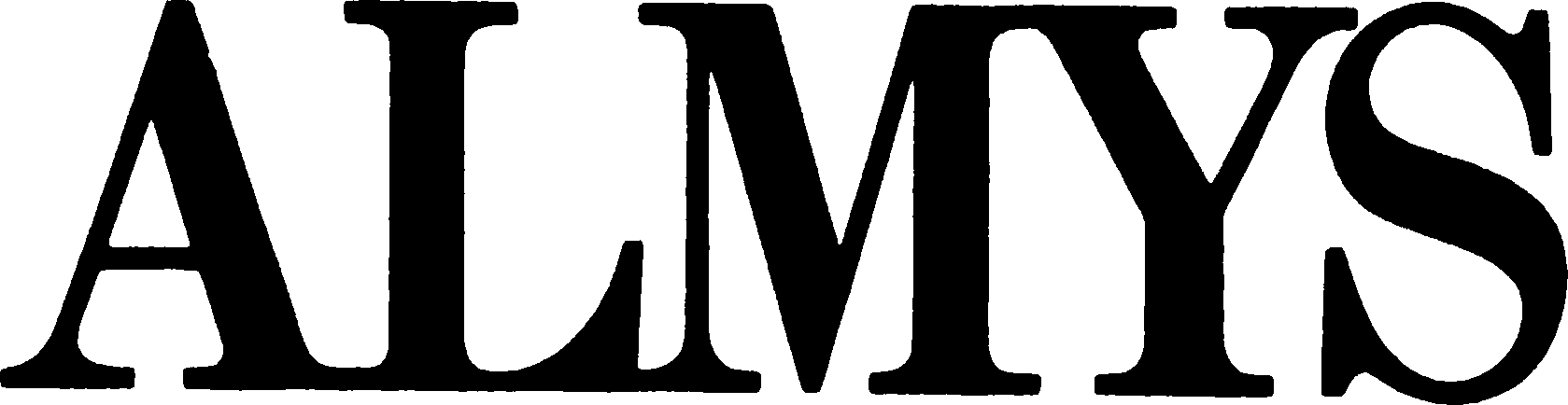
Almys logo

Every December starting in 1890, James Edgar dressed up as Santa Claus to entertain the children of shoppers, thus becoming the first department store Santa. Trains brought families from Boston and Providence to Edgar's to see Santa. In the early 1960s Edgar's was bought by Almy, Bigelow and Washburn, Inc. The corporation ran department stores under various names in eastern Mass. By the mid 70s, some of the stores were renamed "Almy's."

The store sold clothing, home goods, jewelry, cosmetics and some toys. Edgar's Portrait Salon was located on its balcony. All locations featured distinctive bright green carpeting that was one of the stores trademarks.

Edgar's operated in at least three other locations; one in Fall River, Massachusetts, one in the Dartmouth Mall in Dartmouth, Massachusetts, and one in the Swansea Mall, in Swansea, Massachusetts.

For a number of years the stores struggled to compete with chain stores such as Bradlees, Ames, Zayre's and Mammoth Mart while maintaining the "department store cachet." This, along with the company's refusal to abandon city-centers for (by-then) popular malls, forced the company to file for Chapter 11 bankruptcy protection. They were subsequently bought by Bradlees, who closed most of the Almy stores. By the turn of the century Bradlees was driven into bankruptcy and closed.

Edgar's had closed by 1989, when it closed at the Swansea Mall location.
