= Swansea Mall =

Defunct shopping mall in Massachusetts

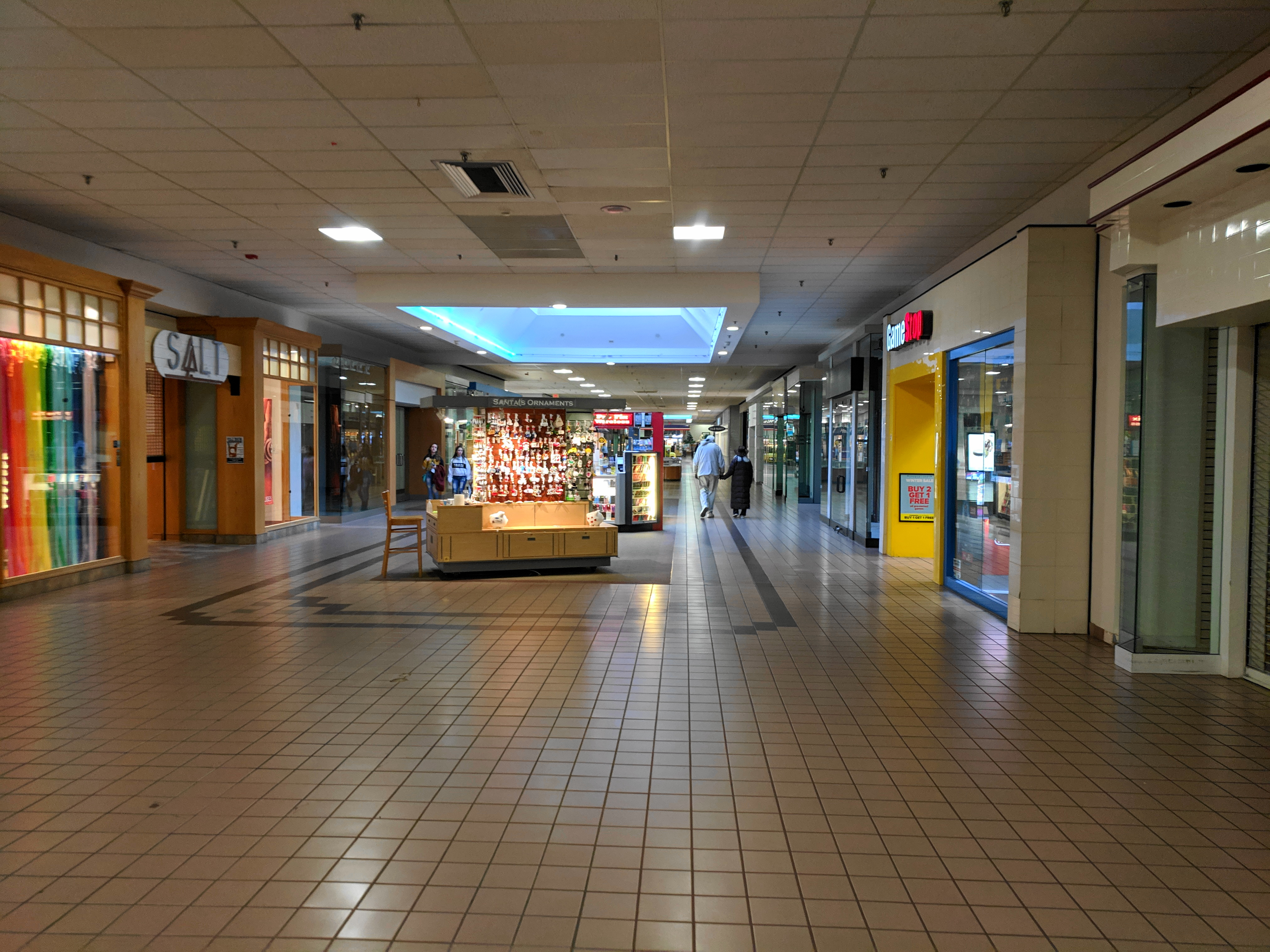
- Swansea Mall interior in 2019
- Location: Swansea, Massachusetts
- Coordinates: 41.755261°N 71.218296°W
- Address: 262 Swansea Mall Drive, Swansea, Mass. 02777
- Opened: 1975
- Closed: March 31, 2019
- Developer: Arlen Realty
- Owner: Anagnost Companies
- Architect: Robert W. Kahn
- Num. of stores: 90
- Num. of anchor tenants: 4
- Floors: 1

Swansea Mall was a regional shopping mall located in Swansea, Massachusetts. It served the Southeastern Massachusetts area. Located off Exit 3 of I-195, the building is situated at the intersection of U.S. Route 6 and Massachusetts Route 118, on Swansea Mall Drive. It had three out-parcel buildings: a Walmart building behind the mall, a former Toys "R" Us, and a shared PriceRite (closed in 2020) and Dollar Tree (formerly a Service Merchandise). The Swansea Crossings shopping plaza, a traditional strip mall added to complement the Swansea Mall in the 1980s, is located across Route 118 and is currently anchored by a Tractor Supply Company. The mall closed permanently on March 31, 2019. It was purchased by Anagnost Companies in May 2019 at auction.

After multiple false starts, conversion of the indoor mall into an outward-facing strip mall began in 2021 and was completed in 2023; the property was renamed to Swansea Center to reflect the renovation. Despite recent redevelopment, the site continues to sit mostly vacant.

== History ==
In 1970, the newly merged Arlen Realty and Development Corporation began an expansion of their regional mall division in the South Coast of Massachusetts by opening the North Dartmouth Mall in 1971 in Dartmouth, Massachusetts. Following the initial success of the North Dartmouth Mall, Arlen sought to expand to other underserved markets in Bristol County, Massachusetts. The town of Swansea, Massachusetts, was determined to have enough market potential to justify the construction of a regional mall near the junction of Massachusetts Route 118 and Route 6. The location was preferred for its proximity to Interstate 195, and was situated between the cities of Fall River and Providence, Rhode Island. Construction on the Swansea Mall would begin during March 1974.

=== Construction riots ===
During construction of the mall, there were issues between union and non-union workers that led to multiple fights between the sides and several injuries. Tensions arose when local unions accused the general contractor of outsourcing labor to out of state non-union workers in order to reduce labor costs. On September 2, 1974, it was reported that over two-thousand unionized workers entered and vandalized the construction site to protest the ongoing project. Several violent altercations occurred between law enforcement and the unionized laborers; five police officers and five union workers were injured during the riot.

Despite the large congregation of rioters at the scene, damages accumulated on the construction site were determined to only amount to $12,000; construction on the mall would resume a week later without issue.

=== Operations and decline ===
The Swansea Mall opened in 1975 with two anchors: Sears and Edgar Department Stores. The mall had a 4-screen movie theater. In the early 1980s, the mall expanded and added two anchors, national discount department store Caldor and Rhode Island–based department store Apex. Two out-parcels were located just south of the original mall, populated by Toys "R" Us and Service Merchandise.

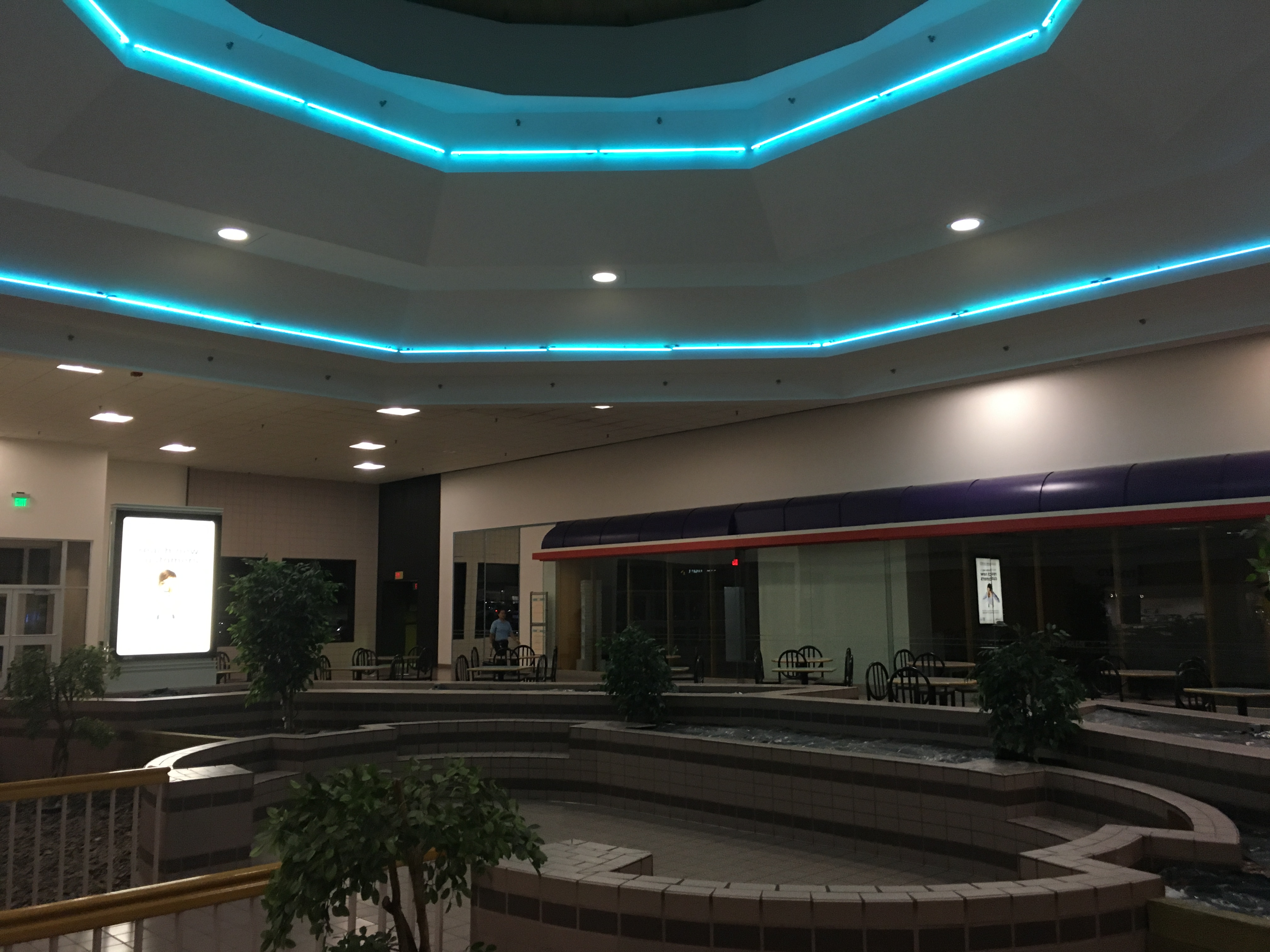
View of the neon-lit atrium, 2018

In 1989, the mall underwent a major interior renovation. By the 1990s, the movie theater was closed, original anchor Edgar's, then out-of-business, was replaced by Jordan Marsh, the hall space was altered with the removal of water fountains, the installation of new lighting, and new floor tiling, and the mall's logo was changed to its current design. In 1996, Jordan Marsh was sold to Macy's. Caldor suffered damage during a fire in 1997 and was closed for a year of renovation. It closed permanently when the company went out of business in 1999. Several restaurants left the mall in the late '90s, such as the pizzeria Roman Delight and Newport Creamery. In 1995, the food court was opened. In 2001, a Walmart replaced the previous Caldor location after its purchase in 1999. Apex closed the same year, with the space remaining vacant for the remainder of the mall's lifespan.

Walmart moved out of the mall and into its own building in September 2013. The previous Walmart wing of the mall was demolished and replaced with parking and a new mall entrance. In December 2013, mall owner Carlyle Development sold off the two southern out-parcel buildings, a Toys R Us and Dollar Tree/Price Rite, to Gator Investments, and announced that it was putting the Swansea Mall up for sale. In January 2014, the mall brought management in-house and ended its relationship with management company, Jones Lang LaSalle. Also in 2014, Kaplan Retail Consulting was hired to oversee the leasing of the mall's retail space. A sale agreement was reached via online auction in November 2014, but by January 2015 the plans had fallen through. On December 28, 2016, it was announced that Sears would be closing as part of its plan to close 150 stores nationwide. The store closed in March 2017. The closure of Sears left the mall with Macy's as its only anchor.

== Closure ==
On June 29, 2018, the out-parcel Toys "R" Us was closed after the chain filed for bankruptcy and closed all US locations. The space was rented as a Spirit Halloween for multiple years after the Toys "R" Us closed. On January 9, 2019, it was announced that Macy's would be closing on March 31, 2019, as part of its plan to close 9 stores nationwide. In January 2019, the Swansea Board of Selectmen discussed a proposal to take the mall property by eminent domain for redevelopment. On January 31, 2019, Carlyle Partners, the mall's owner, announced that Swansea Mall would be closing by March 31, 2019. During the mall's final months, it became a popular destination for dead mall enthusiasts who documented the condition of the mall on social media. On March 31, the mall ceased business and closed.

In May 2019, the property was purchased at auction by Anagnost Companies, alongside Brady Sullivan Properties as a development partner, with plans to turn it into a multifaceted facility. The redevelopment proposal was met with opposition from Walmart which claimed that the mixed-use proposal violated previous easements, covenants, and restrictions (ECRs) that had been made with the former Swansea Mall landowners in 2013; Walmart indicated it would seek to preclude the redevelopment through litigation. By late 2020, redevelopment work had stalled amid growing legal disputes between Anagnost and Walmart.

In May 2021, the developers estimated they would spend $200 million between redeveloping the mall and constructing apartments on the property. The town of Swansea indicated it would pursue litigation against Walmart to acquire the ECRs through eminent domain to allow the redevelopment of the mall to move forward. For a time, town officials considered moving the town offices to the property, but announced in October 2021 that legal issues restricted the move.

== Property redevelopment ==
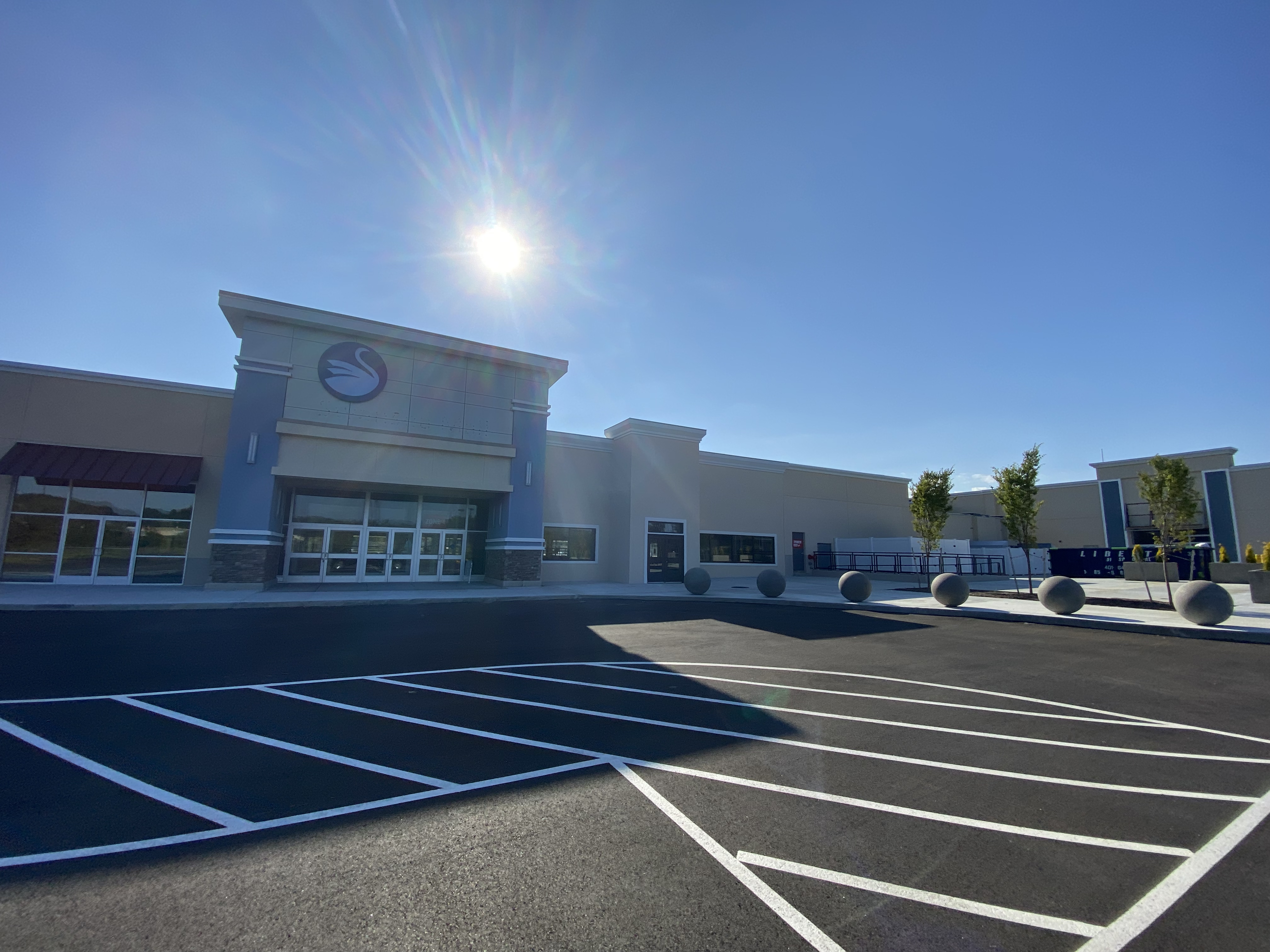
View of renovated southern wing entrance in 2023; the former Swansea Mall logo was kept intact

By mid-2021, the site was held in a tenant‑in‑common ownership structure managed by SM Management LLC, with Anagnost and Brady Sullivan as principal stakeholders. In late 2021, the first section of the mall to be redeveloped was the demolition of the former Apex site, which had sat abandoned for twenty years. By the end of 2021 the property had two tenants; a self-storage facility had opened on the former Apex site and a Pentecostal church congregation occupied the former Macy's. During this time, the southern portion of the mall structure remained abandoned while the northern portion had been substantially gutted.

In summer 2022, Anagnost announced it had finalized negotiations with Walmart which would allow the redevelopment of the property to continue. Anagnost revealed the property would be renamed the “Shoppes at Swansea” and would transform the former enclosed mall into an open-air mixed-use lifestyle center with 110,000 square feet of retail space along with two 72-unit housing complexes. In late 2022, the ring road that formerly encircled the mall structure was repaired and a fitness club moved into the renovated northern section.

In early 2023, the Pentecostal church opened a Christian school as an extension of their existing congregation; a manufacturing office for packaging supplies also opened in the northern section. During this time, the lifestyle center component and housing units had been cancelled in favor of a low-cost outward-facing strip mall renovation with expanded parking; the property was renamed "Swansea Center" to reflect this change. By mid-2023, most of the northern section had been rehabilitated; however, a majority of the property remained without tenants. In June 2023, the town of Swansea and MassDOT indicated plans to transform the existing Swansea Mall Drive portion of MA Route 118 (currently a multi-laned thoroughfare) into an urban boulevard.

The renovated property has struggled to attract tenants; the remainder of the renovated storefronts have been predominately vacant since 2023. In June 2024, it was announced a function center had filed occupancy permits on the site, and opened later that year. In March 2025, Swansea town officials cited outdated sewer infrastructure as a primary deterrent to new and continuing tenancy, arguing that improved infrastructure would be necessary to revitalize leasing activity on the site. Additionally, both officials and local economic development advocates pointed to strong competition from nearby retail centers in Seekonk and Fall River, and expressed concerns about the long-term viability and unclear vision for the property's redevelopment.

== See also ==
- Emerald Square; enclosed mall in Attleboro, still open
- New Harbour Mall; former enclosed mall in Fall River, redeveloped into the SouthCoast Marketplace
- Silver City Galleria; former mall in Taunton, demolished
