= Arthur G. Cohen =

Businessperson

- Born: Arthur George Cohen; April 23, 1930; Brooklyn, New York, US
- Died: August 9, 2014 (aged 84); Kings Point, New York, US
- Education: University of Miami; New York Law School
- Occupation: Real estate developer
- Known for: Co-founder of Arlen Realty & Development Corporation
- Spouse: Karen Bassine
- Children: 5

Arthur George Cohen (April 23, 1930 – August 9, 2014) was an American businessman and real estate developer in New York City.

== Early life and education ==
Cohen was born to a Jewish family in Brooklyn, New York, the son of Frances (née Kostick) and Louis D. Cohen. He completed a BA at the University of Miami and a JD from the New York Law School.

== Career ==
=== Arlen Realty & Development Corporation ===
Cohen became involved in real estate through founding Arlen Realty & Development Corporation with Arthur N. Levien in 1959.

Serving as Arlen's chairman, Cohen began by developing suburban shopping centers throughout the country, and in 1971 he purchased the national discount retail chain E.J. Korvette. By 1975 Arlen owned and managed over 42,000,000 square feet (3,900,000 m^{2}) of shopping centers, and was the largest publicly traded REIT in the nation. Beginning in 1967, Arlen partnered with Donald Soffer's Turnberry Associates in developing the City of Aventura, Florida. In 1975, Arlen partnered with Aristotle Onassis to build Olympic Tower on Fifth Avenue.

Other prominent Arlen buildings included their corporate headquarters 888 7th Avenue, 1500 Broadway and 1501 Broadway in Times Square, 1166 Avenue of the Americas, 800 Third Avenue, 100 Wall Street, and the Westyard Building at 450 West 33rd Street.

=== Additional Investments ===
In addition to Arlen, Cohen continued to invest in real estate, lodging, restaurants, aviation, and manufacturing industries. Some projects include the development of the David Childs designed Worldwide Plaza and the Crowne Plaza Hotel in Times Square with William Zeckendorf Jr., the Peninsula Hotel in New York City, the Hotel Pennsylvania, the Whitehall Building in Battery Park, Fifth Avenue Tower, The Taft Hotel and Manhattan Mall.

Alongside real estate investor Jeff Gural, Cohen was also a partner with David Walentas in the 1979 acquisition of two million square feet of industrial buildings in Dumbo, Brooklyn.

=== Partnership with Ian Schrager ===
Cohen partnered with hotelier Ian Schrager in creating some of the first boutique hotels in New York City at a time when Schrager had much difficulty attracting more conventional sources of financing. The partnership resulted in the acquisition and renovation of hotels such as the Philippe Starck-designed Royalton Hotel and Paramount Hotel, as well as the Barbizon Hotel.

=== Partnership with Paul Manafort and Brad Zackson ===
In June 2008 through CMZ Ventures LLC also spelled ZMC, Cohen and his wife through their control of Vulcan Properties entered into partnership with both Paul Manafort through Manafort's XXX LLC founded on June 8, 2008, and Brad Zackson through Zackson's Barbara Ann Holdings LLC. (Note: Brad S. Zackson was a former manager and fixer for Fred Trump's Trump Organization who ran his own investment and brokerage firm Dynamic Group after leaving the Trump Organization when Fred Trump "aged out.") A major investment of CMZ (Note: CMZ was an abbreviation of "C" for Cohen, "M" for Manafort, and "Z" for Zackson.) was expected to be the Drake Hotel in New York City. On June 30, 2008, Manafort along with Oleg Deripaska and Rick Gates through their Cayman Islands registered Pericles Emerging Market Partners planned to invest $56 million in CMZ. Gates had spoken to two of Deripaska's associates after which Gates told Manafort "to lock the other financing elements and then come back to him for the final piece of investment." In late 2008, CMZ's interest in the Drake Hotel ended because of lack of enough financial backing although Dmitro Firtash had arranged over $100 million in financing. Later, in December 2011, Yulia Tymoshenko alleged that CMZ was a front for the interests of Dmitro Firtash, his Group DF, and Semion Mogilevich, who has links to Russian, Ukrainian, and Hungarian mafia, which intended to place money in pro Russia, pro Kremlin, and pro Putin interests through money laundering in New York real estate investments. In a 30 July 2014 interview with the FBI, Manafort explained that Pericles Investments LLC and CMZ were intended for investment purposes associated with Deripaska and Firtash.

=== Corporate involvement ===
Cohen was a director of Citicorp (now part of Citigroup NYSE: C), the Home Title Division of the Chicago Title Insurance Company (now part of Fidelity National Financial NYSE:FNF), and the John Hancock Mutual Fund. He was on the board of directors and been part of the ownership group for the 1988 leveraged buyout of Braniff Airlines as well as for the 1989 lLeveraged buyout of national restaurant chain Houlihan's and Darryl's.

== Philanthropy ==
Cohen was a former trustee of Brandeis University, New York Law School, Long Island Jewish Medical Center and the Albert Einstein College of Medicine. He received the Jewish National Fund Tree of Life Award, was named the man of the year by the Anti-Defamation League, and was a member of the Special Mission to Israel under Golda Meir and special envoy to aid underprivileged nations under Lyndon B. Johnson. Cohen received an honorary degree from Long Island University.

== Personal life and death ==
Cohen was married to Karen Bassine from Great Neck, New York. They had five daughters: Lauren Reddington, Susan Siegel, Debra Duran, Rochelle Rosenberg and Kathy Horowitz. Cohen died on August 9, 2014, in Kings Point, New York. He was 84.
