= Arlen Realty and Development Corporation =

American real estate investment trust

Arlen Realty & Development Corporation
- Company type: Real estate investment trust
- Founded: 1959; 67 years ago
- Founders: Arthur G. Cohen; Arthur N. Levien
- Headquarters: New York City
- Area served: United States

Arlen Realty & Development Corporation, also known as Arlen, was a real estate investment trust founded in 1959 by Arthur G. Cohen and Arthur N. Levien. In the early 1970s, it was one of the largest publicly traded real estate investment trusts. Arlen began by developing suburban shopping centers throughout the United States, and in 1971, it acquired discount retail chain E.J. Korvette. By 1975, Arlen owned and managed over 42 million square feet of shopping centers, and controlled over $1.7 billion of US real estate assets.

== Operations ==
=== Olympic Tower ===
Arlen developed Olympic Tower, a 52-story building in Midtown Manhattan, with Aristotle Onassis in 1975. It was constructed on a site that was occupied by a Best & Company Store that was built in 1947. It contains 225 condominium apartments and more than 250,000 square feet (23,000 m2) of office space and retail space. Situated next to St. Patrick's Cathedral, it offers views of the cathedral's buttresses and Fifth Avenue. Upon construction, it became a prime real estate location for the glitterati of that time.

The planned use of the building was a groundbreaking concept at that time because it was the first mixed use zoned for Fifth Avenue, which had 21 floors of offices, 30 of condominiums and high-end retail on the first floor. This concept was developed by Julius Krasnove a Vice President of construction at the time and was designed by the architectural firm of Skidmore, Owings and Merrill, who also designed the Willis Tower and John Hancock Center in Chicago, as well as many other high-rise buildings in the U.S. and worldwide.

Olympic Tower was the first residential condominium building in New York to have been built on a ground lease, and set a precedent for many future high end developments such as neighboring Trump Tower. In 2012, an Oxford Properties partnership purchased a minority interest in the buildings retail that valued it at over $1 billion.

=== Aventura ===
Donald Soffer owned the property where Aventura, Florida is currently located and wanted to create a project on it called Biscayne Village. Having difficulty getting financing on his own he went to the John Hancock insurance company who agreed to finance the project if Arlen was the lead developer. As a result of the Village of Biscayne Park incorporated in Dade County objected to the name as it would be confusing the name was changed to Aventura creating the early development of the city Aventura, Florida. Arlens other developments in the county included residential developments (Arlen House, Arlen Beach House, Arlen House East, and Arlen House West), as well as office developments, and the Aventura Country Club.

=== Notable New York City developments ===
Arlen's other high profile New York City developments include the Arlen Building or 888 7th Avenue which was built in 1971 and served as the company's corporate headquarters. In addition to other properties such as 1500 Broadway in Times Square, 1166 Avenue of the Americas, the Westyard Building at 450 West 33rd Street, 100 Wall Street and 800 Third Avenue.

=== Shopping centers and suburban strip retail ===
Arlen's shopping center division was headquartered in Chattanooga, Tennessee and owned and managed many large regional shopping centers and hundreds of strip retail properties across the United States and Puerto Rico. In 1970, Arlen's shopping center division merged with Charles Lebovitz's Independent Enterprises in order to form Arlen subsidiary Arlen Shopping Center Group. Charles Lebovitz, the founder and current chairman of CBL Properties, served as president of Arlen Shopping Center Group throughout the 1970s. Some of Arlen's larger shopping center developments include the Jefferson Valley Mall, Monmouth Mall, Swansea Mall, North Dartmouth Mall, Springfield Town Center, and Orlando Fashion Square. Lebovitz spun off Arlen Shopping Center Group into CBL & Associates in 1978.

=== E.J. Korvette's ===
Arlen owned E. J. Korvette from 1971 to 1979, and used E. J. Korvette 50 stores as a source of cash flow. Under Arlen's ownership, Korvette's stores deteriorated and lost market share. Arlen sold the chain to the Agache-Willot Group of France in 1979.
