= Olympic Tower =

Skyscraper in Manhattan, New York

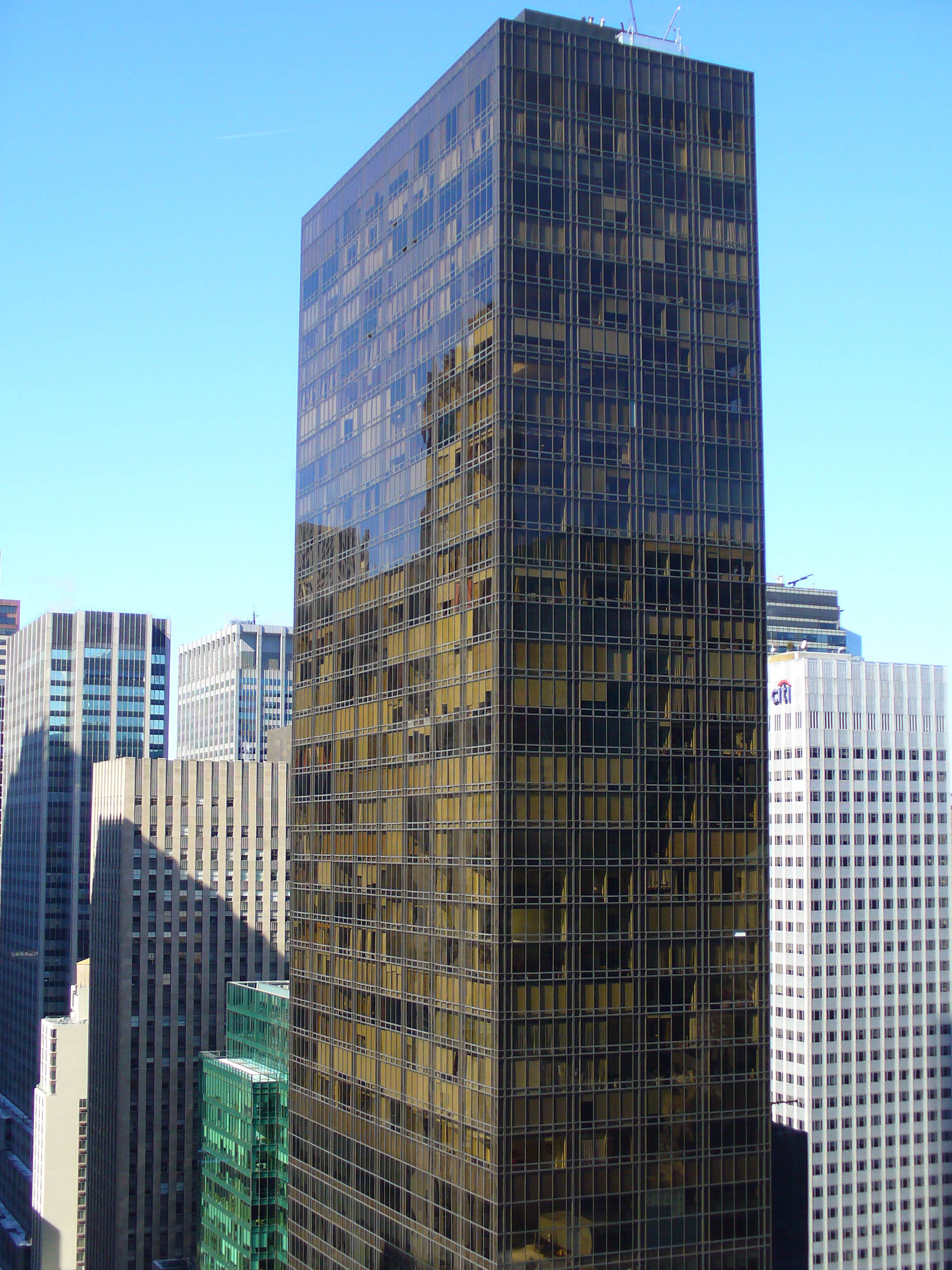
- Interactive map of the Olympic Tower area

General information
- Location: 641 Fifth Avenue; Manhattan, New York
- Coordinates: 40°45′33″N 73°58′34″W
- Construction started: 1971
- Completed: 1974
- Cost: $95 million (equivalent to $469 million in 2024)
- Owner: Oxford Properties
- Management: Oxford Properties

Height
- Roof: 620 ft (190 m)

Technical details
- Floor count: 51
- Floor area: 1,000,000 sq ft (93,000 m^{2})

Design and construction
- Architect: Skidmore, Owings & Merrill
- Developer: Victory Development Corporation, Arlen Realty and Development Corporation
- Engineer: W. A. DiGiacomo & Associates (mechanical); Max Siegel Associates (zoning)
- Structural engineer: James Ruderman
- Main contractor: Tishman Realty & Construction

Olympic Tower is a 51-story, 620 ft-tall (190 m) building at 641 and 645 Fifth Avenue, between 51st and 52nd Streets, in the Midtown Manhattan neighborhood of New York City. Designed by Skidmore, Owings & Merrill (SOM), the mixed-use development contains condominium apartments, office space, and retail shops. The tower is named after Olympic Airways, whose president Aristotle Onassis jointly developed the tower with the Arlen Realty and Development Corporation between 1971 and 1974. It was the first skyscraper to be constructed within a special zoning district to encourage retail and mixed-use development along Fifth Avenue.

The building's glass facade is designed to reflect St. Patrick's Cathedral immediately to the south. The superstructure is made of steel on the lower stories and cast concrete on the upper stories. The first two stories contain a public atrium, Olympic Place, which connects the 51st and 52nd Street facades. The next 19 stories contain office space while the top 30 stories contain 230 condominium apartments. Upon Olympic Tower's completion, architectural writers such as Ada Louise Huxtable and Christopher Gray criticized its design.

Construction of Olympic Tower dates to the late 1960s, when Best & Co. sought to build an office tower above their store at Fifth Avenue and 51st Street. Morris Lapidus was initially hired for the project, but the plans were changed after the zoning district was created. When the building was completed, wealthy non-American buyers purchased most of its residential units. Crown Acquisitions bought Olympic Tower from its original owners in the 2010s.

== Site ==
Olympic Tower is in the Midtown Manhattan neighborhood of New York City. It is along the northeast corner of Fifth Avenue to the west and 51st Street to the south, with an arm extending north to 52nd Street. The building carries the addresses 641 Fifth Avenue for its residential units; 645 Fifth Avenue for its office units; and 10 East 52nd Street for its entrance on 52nd Street. The land lot is L-shaped and covers around 25,600 ft^{2} (2,380 m^{2}), with a frontage of 112.92 ft (34.42 m) on Fifth Avenue and a depth of 192.5 ft (58.7 m). The building wraps around Cartier Building and 647 Fifth Avenue to the northwest and is on the same block as 11 East 51st Street and 488 Madison Avenue to the east. Other nearby buildings include 650 Fifth Avenue to the west, 660 Fifth Avenue to the northwest, Austrian Cultural Forum New York to the north, 12 East 53rd Street and Omni Berkshire Place to the northeast, St. Patrick's Cathedral to the south, and the International Building of Rockefeller Center to the southwest.

Prior to the mid-1940s, a portion of the site was formerly occupied by the Union Club and two residences at 3 East 51st Street and 645 Fifth Avenue. These buildings were demolished by 1944 when a 12-story department store for Best & Co. was announced for the site. The Best & Co. store opened in 1947. Olympic Airways, the national airline of Greece, subleased 647 Fifth Avenue immediately north of the store in 1965 and opened a sales office there the next year.

== Architecture ==
Olympic Tower was designed in the International Style by the architectural firm of Skidmore, Owings and Merrill (SOM). It is 620 ft (189.0 m) tall, with 51 stories. Whitson Overcash of SOM was the partner in charge and Paul Baren was the project manager. Other firms involved in Olympic Tower's construction included general contractor Tishman Realty & Construction, mechanical engineer W. A. DiGiacomo & Associates, structural engineer James Ruderman, and zoning and code engineer Max Siegel.

=== Form and facade ===
The building was the first to take advantage of a special Fifth Avenue zoning district, with retail on the first two floors, followed by offices on the center stories and condominiums on the highest stories. The presence of the zoning district enabled the Fifth Avenue facade of the tower to rise straight up without any setbacks, but setbacks were still required on the 51st and 52nd Street facades. The tower's developers, Arlen Realty and Olympic Airways president Aristotle Onassis, received a zoning variance that exempted them from having to construct a setback on 51st Street. The only setbacks on the tower are on the northern side, facing 52nd Street, where there is a 22-story "bustle". At the time of Olympic Tower's completion, it was the tallest building that faced Fifth Avenue without a setback there.

Olympic Tower has a floor area ratio of 21.6, the maximum permitted in the city when it was completed. The tower received development bonuses in exchange for including a public atrium and for including more than the minimum of retail space that was required for new buildings in the zoning district. In addition to its land lot, the building uses approximately 14,800 ft (4,500 m) of air development rights above neighboring buildings, giving it a total lot area of approximately 40,500 ft^{2} (3,760 m^{2}). When Olympic Tower was developed, buildings in the densest commercial districts could have a FAR of up to 18, but the tower's development bonuses collectively enabled a 20 percent increase in the maximum FAR.

The facade is clad with glass that is tinted brown. The curtain wall is made of black anodized aluminum. According to Whitson Overcash, the glass facade was meant to reflect St. Patrick's Cathedral to the south.

=== Features ===
Olympic Tower's facade contains two stories of retail space, 19 stories of office space, (Note: The office stories cover floors 3 to 19. According to Progressive Architecture, there are only 17 office stories if mechanical floors are excluded.) and 30 stories of apartments. Olympic Tower has several mechanical systems, including steam heating and cooling, secondary water, ventilation, and domestic hot water systems. In total, it was built with 791,745 ft^{2} (73,555.5 m^{2}) of usable space. According to floor plans, Olympic Tower has a single mechanical core at the center of each floor, which contains the elevators, stairs, restrooms, and utility rooms.

The 21-story retail and office base measures 113 ft (34 m) along Fifth Avenue and 158 ft (48 m) along the northern side. The southern side of the base is 177.5 ft (54.1 m) long on 51st Street; the retail space in the lowest stories extends another 15 ft (4.6 m) eastward along that street. The upper stories are rectangular in form, measuring 85 ft (26 m) on Fifth Avenue by about 177.5 feet on 51st Street. The pedestrian atrium on the lowest stories measures about 50 ft (15 m) wide and 200 ft (61 m) long between 51st and 52nd Streets.

==== Superstructure ====
The superstructure is unconventional in that the lower stories are made of steel while the upper stories are made of cast concrete. Though the superstructure uses conventional methods of steel and concrete construction, the combination of both types of construction is less common. The superstructure for the first 21 stories is composed of structural steel columns and girders, and the floor slabs are covered with reinforced concrete. On the upper 30 stories, the columns and floor slabs are made of reinforced concrete. Concrete had better acoustics, the apartments did not require as deep a floor slab compared to the steel frame, and the apartments did not require flexible partitions like the office stories did. The developer, Tishman Speyer, decided not to use a mixture of steel and concrete superstructures for later projects because it was time-consuming and expensive. Steel frames topped by concrete frames have since been used in structures such as the Bloomberg Tower.

The steel structure for the office and retail stories divides the floor area into bays of 22 by 20 ft (6.7 by 6.1 m). A steel vertical truss rises through the first 21 stories of the building. The 22nd floor is designed as a transitional floor where vertical and lateral loads from the upper stories are transferred onto the steel truss. The concrete columns of the upper stories and the steel columns of the lower stories are not perfectly aligned, so the 22nd floor acts as a truss with 36 in-deep (910 mm) transfer girders connecting the columns on the upper and lower stories. Steel billet plates, with thicknesses of between 2 and 9 in (51 and 229 mm), are welded to the girders' top flanges. Above the billet plates are 2 in-thick (51 mm) steel base plates with dowels on their top sides, to which the cast concrete columns' rebar cages are connected. A concrete shear wall rises above the 22nd floor. The concrete floor slabs are about 12 in (300 mm) thick for the 23rd through 34th floors and are about 12 in (300 mm) thick for the 35th through 51st floors.

==== Atrium ====
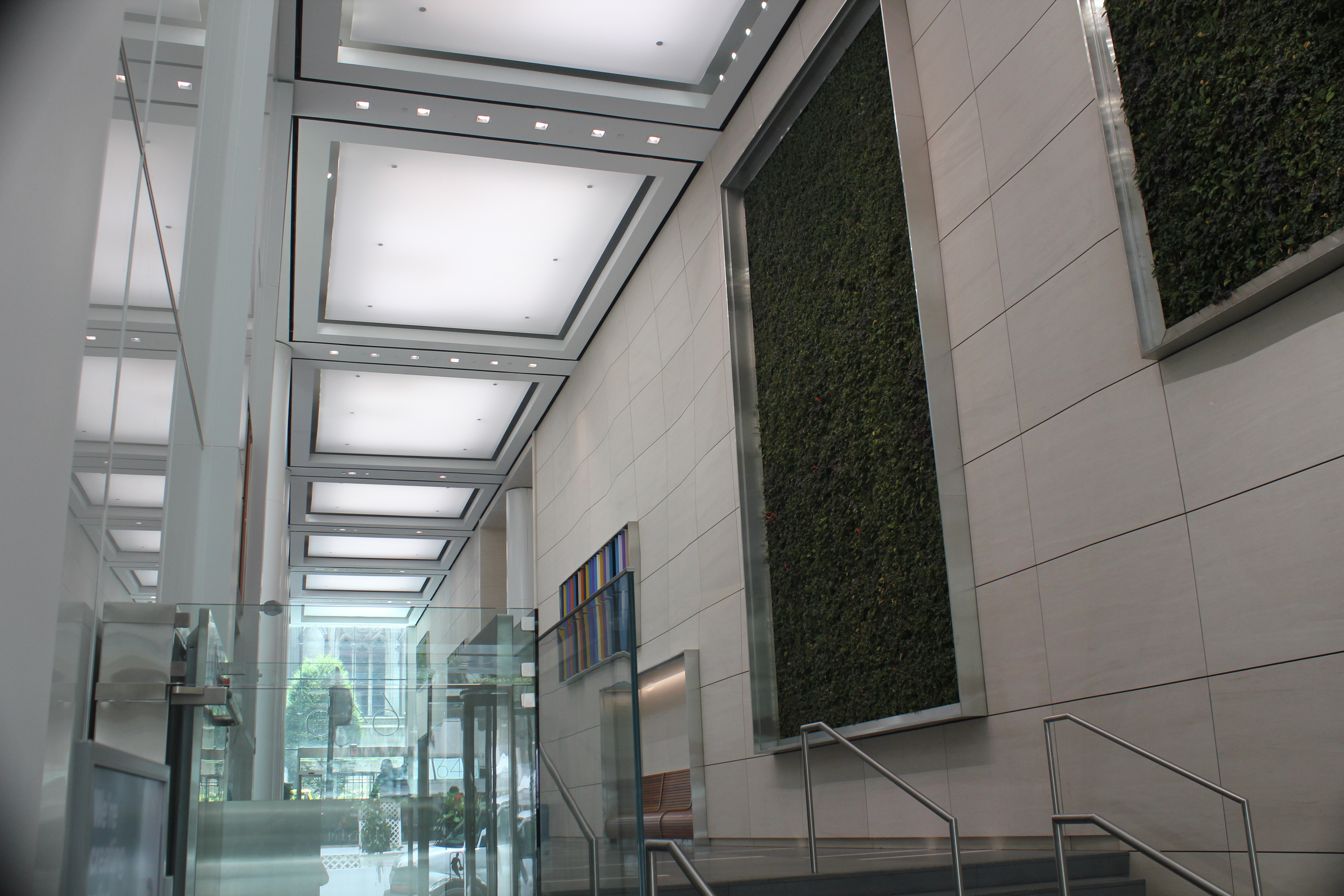
Atrium interior

A midblock pedestrian atrium, originally known as Olympic Place, is included in Olympic Tower's design. The atrium, connecting 51st and 52nd Streets, covers 8,766 ft^{2} (814.4 m^{2}) and is designed as the office lobby. The atrium contains two stories and is 34.5 ft (10.5 m) high on average. The upper tier of the atrium contains retail space, and the atrium also contains a three-tiered waterfall. The waterfall is built above a driveway for garbage trucks.

The atrium is enclosed at either end with revolving doors and, as designed, had minimal exterior signage advertising its presence. When Olympic Tower was being developed, the city allowed developers to enclose their public spaces as long as these spaces had heating and cooling systems. The city also incentivized developers to build enclosed spaces by awarding higher development bonuses for public spaces that were heated and cooled; this legislation was changed after Olympic Tower was constructed. (Note: Buildings received 14 square feet of additional interior space for every square foot of enclosed space. By contrast, they would have received 11 square feet of interior space for every square foot of open-air atrium space.) Additionally, the atrium was originally sparsely outfitted and had few chairs and tables. Under city laws regulating privately owned public spaces, Olympic Tower's owners were obligated to provide a minimum number of trees, light fixtures, benches, movable chairs, and planters. A writer for The Washington Post stated in 1992 that the atrium's "white chairs discourage lingering".

Moed de Armas and Shannon renovated the atrium in 2019. As part of the renovation, Triangulated Passage Work, a set of sculptural artworks by Liam Gillick, was installed in the atrium. The works consist of five sculptured panels mounted on the walls. The atrium's lighting system was designed to be active 24 hours a day, but the intensity of the light throughout the day was adjusted to align with the circadian rhythms. A new cafe was installed in the atrium as well. As part of the renovation, a green wall with five types of plants was installed on parts of the atrium's walls.

==== Office space ====
The office component of the building consists of the third through 21st floors. The office space covers approximately 480,000 ft^{2} (45,000 m^{2}). The office stories cover 20,000 ft^{2} (1,900 m^{2}) on average. Initially, the eighth floor was leased as short-term executive offices and the ninth floor was marketed to small tenants. The developers included numerous amenities to entice large companies. These included a Telex service, stock quotation machines, and a news ticker.

==== Condominiums ====
As of October 2019, Olympic Tower has 229 condominium units. When the building was constructed, it had 230 apartments on the top 30 stories. (Note: An early report cited 225 apartments on 29 stories.) The condominium entrance was on 51st Street, just west of the entrance to the atrium on that side. The residential stories start at floor 22 and cover 16,000 ft^{2} (1,500 m^{2}) on average.

There are up to eight apartments to a floor, most with one or two bedrooms. The apartments contain full-height windows and 9 ft-tall (2.7 m) ceilings. The designs of the rooms are relatively simple and, because the full-height windows did not allow mechanical systems to be embedded in the facade, each apartment has central ventilation. Many of the apartments' living rooms face the Hudson River to the west as well as the East River to the east. When Olympic Tower opened, its condominiums had bidets, which were not common in U.S. residences. An Associated Press writer called the condos "very European in concept", as most bathrooms had bidets and a hallman delivered mail directly to each apartment. Many of the condos retain their original appliances and designs, while other units have been renovated over the years to match residents' preferences.

The top two floors contain four duplexes with the only fireplaces in the entire building. One of the duplexes was occupied by Adnan Khashoggi and was built with its own swimming pool, as well as five bedrooms, six bathrooms, indoor gardens, a 300-seat catering kitchen, a ballroom, and a sauna. Another duplex contains a living room facing north and west, a dining room, a butler's pantry, a kitchen, a private elevator, four bedrooms, and a sauna. The penthouse apartments were the highest in the world when Olympic Tower was completed, although the uninhabited domes of the Waldorf Astoria New York were slightly taller.

Amenities for the residential portion of the building included a health club, newsstand, sauna, and wine cellar. The residential section also has a fitness center and bicycle parking. When it opened, Olympic Tower had security guards at every entrance, as well as intrusion alarms connected to a computer. The tower also had a high number of service staff, including a doorman, hallman, elevator operators, maids, and three concierges, as well as 24/7 dry cleaning and room service. The concierges could speak multiple languages, resolve residents' issues quietly, and even reportedly book yachts and helicopters for residents on short notice. One of the first managers of Olympic Tower said of the concierge service: "We run this more like a hotel than a residence."

== History ==
=== Planning and construction ===
By the late 1960s, Best & Co. was struggling financially despite a program of investment from its owner, the McCrory Corporation. At the time, Best's was considering adding a tower over their Fifth Avenue flagship. The company hired Arlen Realty to manage the development. Best's developers acquired the air rights over 647 Fifth Avenue and the Cartier Building, which allowed them to build a taller building than would have been ordinarily permitted. The developers also considered obtaining the air rights over St. Patrick's Cathedral. Arlen originally hired Norval White and Elliot Willensky to design a building above the Best's store itself.

==== Initial plans ====
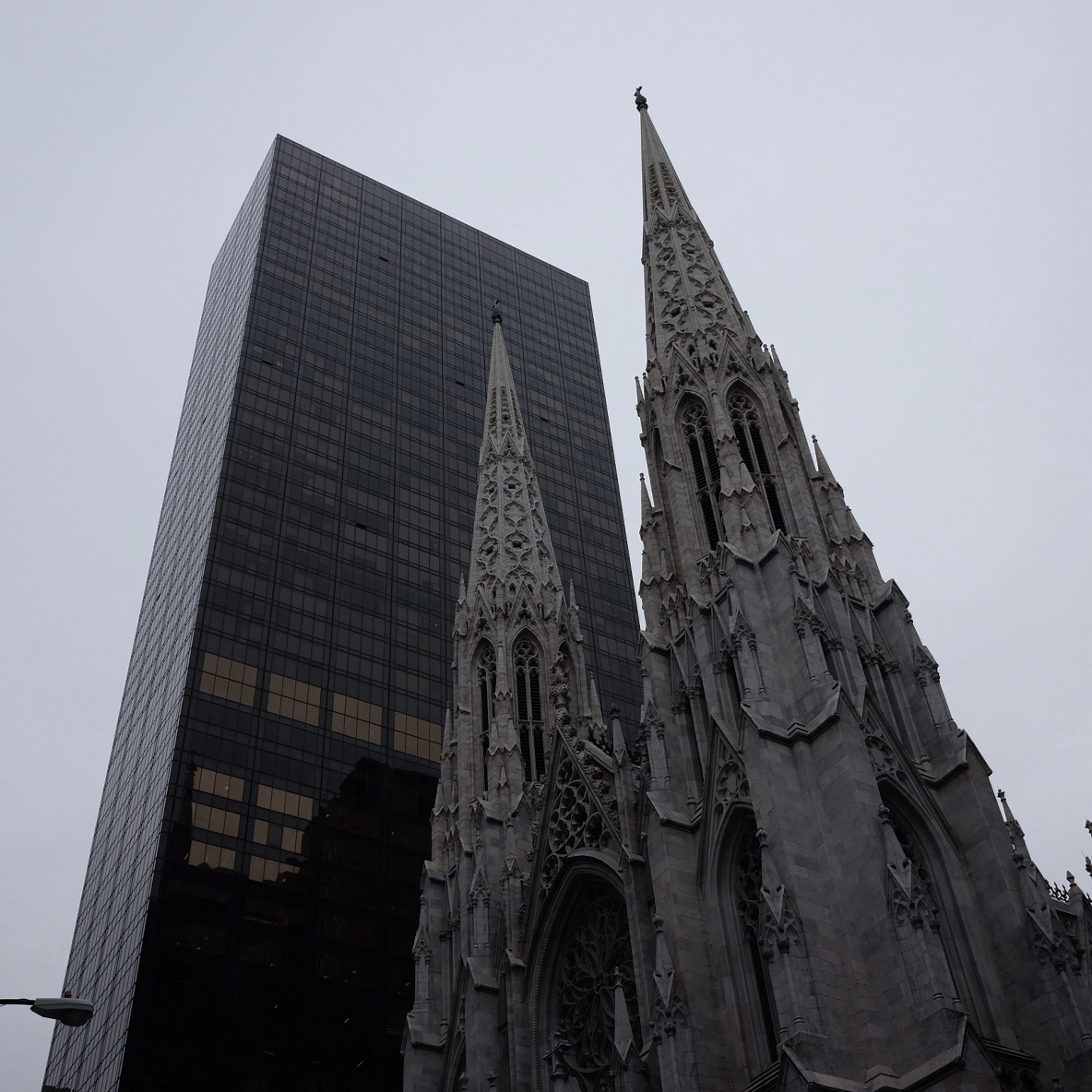
Seen in the background with St. Patrick's Cathedral at right

Aristotle Onassis established a family trust called Victory Development in March 1970. Victory formed a joint venture with Arlen to acquire Best's Fifth Avenue flagship, 647 Fifth Avenue, and the Cartier Building. Architect Morris Lapidus was hired for the initial iteration of the project. Lapidus recalled that he had begged Arthur Levien and Arthur G. Cohen, the presidents of Arlen Realty, "for two long years" to be hired for Arlen and Best's development. Because of his relatively small amount of experience in office design, Arlen had initially been hesitant to hire Lapidus, who specialized in residential buildings. However, after Arlen rejected proposals from six other firms, the company allowed Lapidus one week to create a design.

Lapidus proposed an L-shaped 40-story building, the bottom half of which would have been a granite slab. Meshulam Riklis, chairman of McCrory's parent corporation Rapid America, recalled that the slab would be topped by a glass "cube" with a sky plaza, a full-story art gallery, offices, and executive apartments. 647 Fifth Avenue would have been demolished, but the Cartier and Best's buildings would have remained in place. The building would have included an atrium between 51st and 52nd Streets as well as a plaza running to Fifth Avenue. Onassis and Riklis approved of Lapidus's plan and hired him to create designs for the Olympic/Arlen project.

In October 1970, McCrory executives decided to liquidate Best's and close all its stores, including the flagship location at Fifth Avenue and 51st Street. McCrory's president Samuel Neaman said at the time that the site of Best's Fifth Avenue flagship was worth more as a potential real estate development than as a retail location. By then, the joint venture planned to tear down the Best's store and erect a skyscraper called Olympic Tower on the site. Cohen was negotiating with several department store chains to open a store in the base, which, along with a public atrium, would allow a greater development bonus for the skyscraper. Shortly after the closure of Best's was announced, an editorial appeared in The New York Times, specifically naming Lapidus's involvement in Olympic Tower as an example of Fifth Avenue's decline. According to Lapidus, the editorial created difficulties with his involvement in the project. Lapidus's exhibit that year at the Architectural League of New York also influenced opinions against his Olympic Tower proposal.

==== Modified plans ====
Around the same time as planning for Olympic Tower was taking place, a special zoning district was created along Fifth Avenue. In February 1971, New York City mayor John Lindsay proposed the district as a means to preserve the retail character of Fifth Avenue's midtown section. The legislation provided development "bonuses" like additional floor area in exchange for the inclusion of ground-story retail, and it encouraged the construction of Fifth Avenue skyscrapers with retail, offices, and apartments. The legislation went into effect in April 1971. After the zoning district was created, the mayoral Office of Midtown Planning, led by Jaquelin Robertson, collaborated with Olympic and Arlen to add mixed uses to Olympic Tower. Robertson's office perceived Lapidus's design as excessively unconventional and influenced Olympic and Arlen to reconsider the design. Aristotle's wife, former U.S. first lady Jacqueline Kennedy Onassis, also opposed Lapidus's involvement, saying she "could not have his name associated with such vulgarity". Lapidus was subsequently fired and replaced with Kahn & Jacobs, which was also dismissed.

In September 1971, Lindsay announced that SOM would design Olympic Tower. The 50-story building would include retail on the lower floors, offices on the middle floors, and apartments on the upper floors. A two-story atrium would run through the building, connecting with St. Patrick's Cathedral to the south and another atrium and Paley Park to the north. Cohen said Terence Cooke, the Archbishop of New York and the cardinal of St. Patrick's, was "very pleased" with the plans. The building would be the first to be developed within the Fifth Avenue zoning district. Olympic Airways initially intended to renovate 647 Fifth Avenue with a glass facade similar to that of the tower. After architectural critics Ada Louise Huxtable, Paul Goldberger, and other people in the architectural community objected, SOM decided to retain the original facade on 647 Fifth Avenue, which had been designed by Hunt & Hunt.

Olympic Tower's developers hired a graphics design firm to create a sign with propellers that spelled the building's name three times. The sign was mounted on the building's scaffolding, and the propellers would spin every time wind blew. By June 1973, the steel framework had passed the twelfth story. The first retail lease in the building was signed in October 1973 to confectionery Perugina, a subsidiary of Italian manufacturer Buitoni. Olympic Tower Associates released an offering plan for its 230 condominiums in May 1974. The offering valued the condos at $46.9 million (equivalent to $231 million in 2024 (Note: Johnston, Louis; Williamson, Samuel H. (2023). "What Was the U.S. GDP Then?". MeasuringWorth. United States Gross Domestic Product deflator figures follow the MeasuringWorth series.)), the most expensive offering for a building in New York City. Olympic Tower was intentionally structured as a condo development because its residences were to be marketed primarily to foreign buyers. At the time, most other luxury developments in the city were housing cooperatives, which Curbed wrote could "reject applications for almost any reason", and the developers wished to avoid this.

=== Opening and early years ===
==== Opening ====
Olympic Tower was formally dedicated on September 6, 1974. At the time, more than 70 percent of the commercial space had been leased and 24 of the apartments had been sold. The first residents were expected to move into the building in early 1975. The building cost $95 million in total (equivalent to $469 million in 2024) and the residential units ranged from $40,000 for a studio ($197,373 in 2024) to $650,000 for a duplex unit with nine rooms ($3.21 million in 2024). Robertson, who had started working for Arlen, said of the tower's opening: "It would bring people back to midtown". The building had been planned with 230 apartments, but some of the units were subdivided after the most expensive units sold extremely quickly. By December 1974, three-quarters of the office space was leased, and forty of the residences had been sold. Due to high demand for the condos, additional apartments were created within the existing space shortly after Olympic Tower was finished.

Most of the residential units were sold to non-American owners, and the buyers included governments and corporations. Brochures were printed in French, German, Japanese, and Spanish, as well as English. Arlen hired public relations company Burson Marsteller, which advertised the building in Europe, South America, and Mexico. Arlen also hired four decorators to create model apartments. The company commissioned a photographer to take photos from a crane on the roof, which were then displayed in the sales office. The public areas and building documents were designed with a silver and brown color scheme; these colors were even used on the personalized hard hats that were given to prospective buyers. Arlen vice president Stanley Thea said the building had been advertised "to a select core of 80.000 people around the world", while Robertson said "Finally we are building in the 1970s what was shown in the movies of the 1940s—penthouses on the 50th floor." Most of these units were intended as pieds-à-terre, and some wealthy owners bought multiple apartments. Olympic Tower's bylaws specified that the condominium board wait twenty days before approving any sale of a residential unit.

==== Late 20th century ====
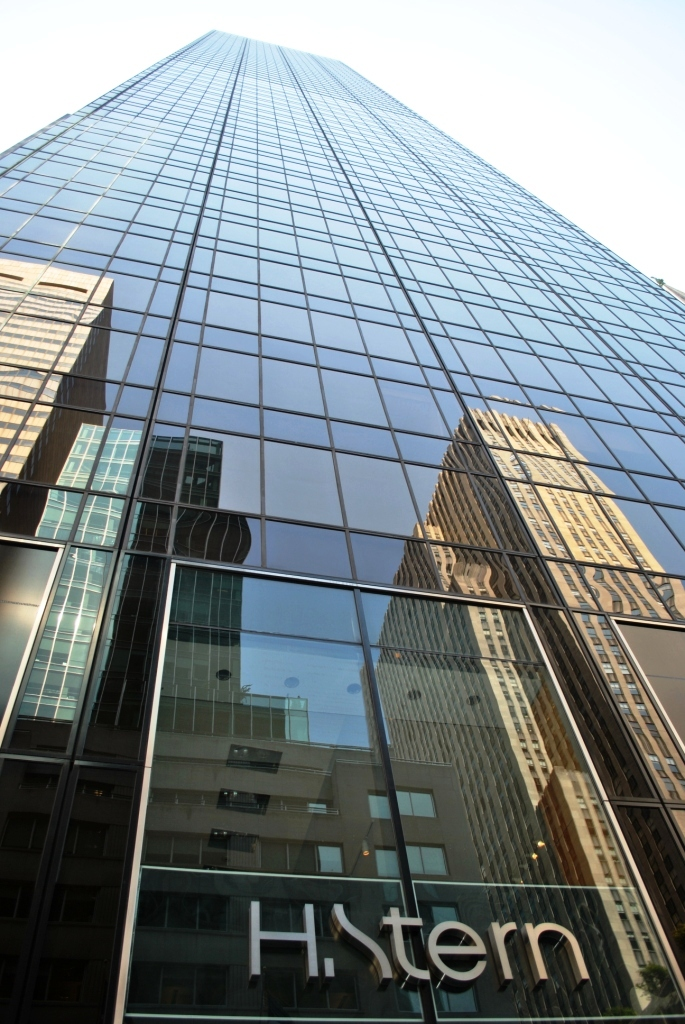
Seen from the base

By 1975, foreign residents had bought about 80 percent of the condominiums for between $122,000 and $650,000 apiece. Mexicans and Venezuelans made up a quarter of all buyers. Only 20 apartments remained unsold and the office space was 85 percent occupied. However, the retail mall did not yet have any restaurants. All the office space was occupied by 1978. Arlen sold its interest in Olympic Tower to Williston S.A., a Panamanian company that was owned by the Onassis family, in late 1979. At that time, Arlen was several hundred million dollars in debt and was selling off many of its properties.

In its first five years of operation, none of Olympic Tower's retail space had been rented out, and the atrium was for the most part empty. As a result, New York City Planning Commission head Robert F. Wagner Jr. threatened to revoke Olympic Tower's certificate of occupancy in 1979, saying the building's owners had not upheld an agreement to add stores to the retail mall in exchange for zoning bonuses. Afterward, Olympic Tower's owners opened a newsstand, public restrooms, and restaurant space in the atrium. The restaurant La Cote Basque was operating at Olympic Tower by 1981. In addition, Delices operated a pastry shop, bar, and a terrace called Le Cafe at ground level, as well as a restaurant called La Cascade in the basement, overlooking the waterfall. The public atrium at Olympic Tower was completely rented by August 1982. The atrium was also used for events such as concerts.

Other luxury residential towers such as Trump Tower and 500 Park Tower were developed nearby in the 1980s. Afterward, prices of residential units at Olympic Tower started to decline in comparison to units in the newer buildings. By 1985, the average unit at Olympic Tower sold for $202,000 per room ($0.5 million in 2024). Units at Trump Tower, which was also on Fifth Avenue, sold for an average of $263,910 per room ($0.65 million in 2024). Olympic Tower's condominium units continued to see high demand from Europeans looking to live on Fifth Avenue, though critics said the residences were not well maintained. The midtown section of Fifth Avenue was again becoming a fashionable retail strip by the mid-1990s. Several large brands had offered to occupy some of Olympic Tower's retail space, but Olympic Tower Associates rejected these offers. One brokerage executive said the building's operators "want a tenant in keeping with H.Stern, Mark Cross and Versace", which already occupied retail space on the block. Demand for apartments also increased in the 1990s due to a dearth of new luxury residential developments in the city at the time.

=== Early 21st century ===
In May 2012, the Alexander S. Onassis Public Benefit Foundation sold a 49.9 percent stake in the commercial portion of the tower and three neighboring structures to real estate investment firm Crown Acquisitions for $420 million. Olympic Tower and the structures at 647 Fifth Avenue, the Cartier Building, and 10 East 52nd Street were valued at about $1 billion. At the time, all the retail tenants were paying less than $1,000/ft^{2} ($11,000/m^{2}), significantly less than the market rent paid at similar structures. Crown Acquisitions purchased the remaining ownership interests in Olympic Tower and the three neighboring structures for $652 million in May 2015. In the same transaction, Oxford Properties acquired a majority interest.

The owners received a $760 million commercial mortgage-backed security (CMBS) interest-only loan in May 2017 from Deutsche Bank, Goldman Sachs, and Morgan Stanley. Olympic Tower's owners used the tower itself to back the CMBS loan. The loan was broken into 11 pari passu senior notes totaling $611 million and 3 junior notes totaling $149 million. The banks also originated a $240 million mezzanine loan which was subsequently sold to TIAA and Mirae Asset Financial Group. Oxford Properties hired MdeAS Architects to renovate Olympic Tower's atrium. The refurbished space reopened in January 2019.

== Tenants ==
=== Office and commercial tenants ===
When the building opened in 1975, Onassis's companies Olympic Airways and Victory Development respectively took the entire fifth and sixth floors. Law firm Golembock & Barrell took the 11th floor and part of the 12th floor, Bermudan marketing firm JOC took the 17th through 19th floors, and Riklis's conglomerate Rapid American took the 14th through 16th floors and the 20th and 21st floors. Roberta di Camerino boutique took the ground floor.

Since 1998, the National Basketball Association has had its headquarters at the property. The organization occupies 175,000 sq ft (16,300 m^{2}) across floors 11 through 20 with a lease extending through 2035. Richemont's North America subsidiary has also been headquartered at the property since 2001, with their current space covering 126,000 sq ft (11,700 m^{2}) on floors three through nine. Michael Dell's investment firm MSD Capital occupies roughly 44,000 sq ft (4,100 m^{2}) on floors 10 and 21. The building's Fifth Avenue retail space is occupied by luxury retailers such as Richemont, H.Stern, Armani Exchange, Longchamp, Furla, and Jimmy Choo Ltd.

=== Residents ===
Olympic Tower initially acted largely as a pied-à-terre, with few residents living full time. When the building opened, Aristotle Onassis took an apartment for himself. Another original occupant was fashion designer Halston, who occupied the entire 21st floor for his showroom, workroom, and design rooms until 1984. Billionaire Adnan Khashoggi owned a penthouse duplex from 1976 to 1993. The Marcos family of the Philippines allegedly owned five condominiums at Olympic Tower, including a ten-room apartment on the 43rd floor. The administration of Philippine President Corazon Aquino seized the Marcos apartment in the late 1980s while recovering some unexplained wealth of the Marcos family.

Foreign demand for the condos declined after the September 11 attacks in 2001, and the tower began to attract local residents and employees. These included General Electric's board of directors, who worked at Rockefeller Center, as well as designers Laurice Rahmé, Giuseppe Zanotti, and Lorraine Schwartz, who preferred the structure for its history, architecture, and proximity to several high-end stores. The actress Anne Hathaway and her then-partner Raffaello Follieri lived in Khashoggi's old residence until 2012. The choreographer, director, and dancer Ron Field also lived in the building, as did musician Roger Waters, actor Nicolas Cage, and the wealthy Wertheimer family of Israel. Alessandra and Allegra Gucci, the daughters of Maurizio Gucci, owned a penthouse, which they listed for sale in August 2015. The restaurateur Rocky Aoki owned a penthouse, and the businessman Alejandro Betancourt López also bought a penthouse in the building. Curbed wrote in 2022 that the building's residents were "obsessed with anonymity" and that "A number have gone decades without even seeing their next-door neighbors."

== Critical reception ==
After SOM's plans for the building were announced, a writer for Newsday said Olympic Tower would provide "a clear test of strength between God and Mammon", being right across from St. Patrick's Cathedral. Progressive Architecture magazine characterized the new plans as having attracted attention from members of the public who wanted to see Fifth Avenue's revival. According to a writer for the website CityRealty, Olympic Tower's design was "more conservative, yet paradoxically also more cutting-edge" compared to the Galleria condominiums on 57th Street, which was built around the same time.

When the building opened, Paul Goldberger of The New York Times criticized the facade as being "not as refined as Skidmore Owings and Merrill's best work". Goldberger called the building's architecture "oppressively banal" and described it as "overwhelm[ing] Fifth Avenue like an aircraft carrier beside a row of sailboats". Ada Louise Huxtable of the same newspaper said Olympic Tower was "about as nondescript as anything that size can be" and described the residential lobby as "mildly offensive in design and taste and quite disposable". Huxtable saw Olympic Place as a "cop-out" and said that, with the inclusion of the plaza, "Olympic Tower has given the city the back of its hand". Suzanne Stephens of Progressive Architecture said that the tower was "awkward in form, but slick in style, a solution that conveys signs of urbanity rather than creating a sense of urban place".
