= Moed de Armas and Shannon =

Architecture firm

MdeAS Architects
- Formerly: Moed de Armas & Shannon Architects
- Type: Architecture firm
- Industry: Architecture; design
- Founded: 1991
- Founders: Leon Moed; Raúl de Armas
- Headquarters: New York City, New York
- Key people: Dan Shannon; Raúl de Armas; Mike Zaborski
- Services: Architecture; façade replacements; lobby renovations; public space design

MdeAS Architects, formerly Moed de Armas & Shannon Architects, is a New York-based architecture firm founded in 1991 and led by principals Dan Shannon, Raúl de Armas and Mike Zaborski.

== History ==
Partners Leon Moed and Raul de Armas founded the firm in 1991 after leaving their positions as senior partners at Skidmore, Owings & Merrill. Dan Shannon, an associate at SOM, joined Moed de Armas Architects at its founding. In 1997, he became a partner and the firm changed its name to Moed de Armas & Shannon. Mike Zaborski joined the firm in 1998 and became a partner in 2012. The firm officially changed its name to MdeAS Architects in October 2014. They have jointly completed 510 Madison Avenue, Gotham Center, the rejuvenation of the GM Building Plaza, and the redevelopments of 100 Park Avenue and 330 Madison Avenue. The firm also designed a glass spandrel system to replace the deteriorating marble façade of Canada's tallest building, First Canadian Place in Toronto.

The firm has a particular focus on facade replacements, public spaces and lobby renovations.

== Completed projects ==
- 100 Park Avenue Redevelopment – New York, New York, 2009
- 160 Fifth Avenue Redevelopment – New York, New York, 2009
- 200 Park Avenue Redevelopment – New York, New York, 2008
- 245 Park Avenue Lobby – New York, New York, 1996
- 300 Park Avenue Redevelopment – New York, New York, 2001
- 310 East 53rd Street – New York, New York, 2006
- 330 Madison Avenue Redevelopment – New York, New York, 2012
- 340 Madison Avenue Redevelopment– New York, New York, 2005
- 350 Madison Avenue Redevelopment – New York, New York, 2009
- 350 West Broadway – New York, New York, 2009
- 400 South Hope Street Lobby & Atrium – Los Angeles, California, 2011
- 430 Park Avenue Redevelopment – New York, New York, 2004
- 450 Park Avenue Lobby – New York, New York, 2004
- 485 Lexington Avenue Lobby – New York, New York, 2006
- 510 Madison Avenue – New York, New York, 2010
- 520 Madison Avenue Lobby – New York, New York, 2009
- 540 Madison Avenue Retail Base and Lobby – New York, New York, 1997
- 545 Madison Avenue Redevelopment – New York, New York, 2009
- 575 Fifth Avenue Retail Base and Atrium – New York, New York, 2010
- 888 Seventh Avenue Lobby & Plaza – New York, New York, 2009
- 950 Third Avenue Lobby & Entry Pavilion – New York, New York, 2005
- 1095 Avenue of the Americas Redevelopment – New York, New York, 2008
- The Grace Building Plaza – New York, New York, 2012
- 1120 Avenue of the Americas Redevelopment – New York, New York, 2007
- 1270 Avenue of the Americas Lobby – New York, New York, 2009
- 1330 Avenue of the Americas Lobby – New York, New York, 2008
- 1350 Avenue of the Americas Lobby – New York, New York, 2008
- 1440 Broadway Lobby – New York, New York, 2001
- 1450 Broadway Base Recladding – New York, New York, 2002
- 1740 Broadway Lobby – New York, New York, 2005
- Apollo Real Estate Advisors Offices – New York, New York, 1996-2002
- Children's Hospital @ Montefiore – Bronx, New York, 2001
- Joan and Sanford Weill Education Center, Cornell University Medical Center, New York, New York, 1998
- First Canadian Place Recladding – Toronto, Ontario, 2012
- Gotham Center – Long Island City, New York, 2010
- Greene Medical Arts Pavilion @ Montefiore – Bronx, New York, 1994
- Tower 56 Lobby – New York, New York, 2011
- Weill Cornell Medical College Master Plan – Education City, Qatar, 2004
- Main Airport Center Lobby – Frankfurt am Main, Germany, 2004
- Rockefeller Center Elevator Cabs – New York, New York, 2008-2010
- Credit Lyonnais Offices – New York, New York, 1991
- 1325 G Street NW Lobby and Recladding – Washington, D.C., 2004
- 101 West End Avenue, Park Hudson Building – New York, New York, 2001
- 525 West Monroe Street Lobby & Atrium – Chicago, Illinois, 2005
- 757 Third Avenue Lobby & Storefronts – New York, New York, 2012

== Projects under construction ==
- First Canadian Place Podium, Concourse & Lobby – Toronto, Ontario, Fall 2012
- 120 West 42nd Street – New York, New York, Winter 2012
- 1290 Avenue of the Americas Lobby – New York, New York, Spring 2013
- 1330 Avenue of the Americas Plaza & Pre-built Offices – New York, New York, Fall 2012
- The Town School Windmill Installation – New York, Fall 2012
- 400 Park Avenue Window Replacement – New York, New York, Winter 2012
- 1177 Avenue of the Americas Lobby – New York, New York, Spring 2013
- 527 Madison Avenue Lobby – New York, New York, Winter 2012
- 2 Grand Central Tower Plaza – New York, New York, Spring 2013
- 110 Fifth Ave. – New York, New York
