= Massachusetts Route 118 =

State highway in Bristol County, Massachusetts, US

Route 118
- Route 118 highlighted in red

Route information
- Maintained by MassDOT
- Length: 16.88 mi (27.17 km)

Major junctions
- South end: US 6 in Swansea
- US 44 in Rehoboth
- North end: Route 123 / Route 152 in Attleboro

Location
- Country: United States
- State: Massachusetts
- Counties: Bristol

Highway system
- Massachusetts State Highway System; Interstate; US; State
← Route 117	→ Route 119

Route 118 is a 16.88-mile-long (27.17 km) north-south state highway in Bristol County, Massachusetts. Its southern terminus is at U.S. Route 6 (US 6) in Swansea and its northern terminus is at Route 123 in Attleboro. Along the way it intersects US 44 in Rehoboth.

== Route description ==
Route 118 begins at U.S. Route 6 just east of I-195's Exit 3. The route, which begins as Swansea Mall Drive, passes Swansea Mall and the Swansea Crossing shopping center before crossing Wood Street and turning into Oak Street. At the end of Oak Street, Route 118 turns onto Locust Street briefly before turning onto Plain Street and entering Rehoboth.

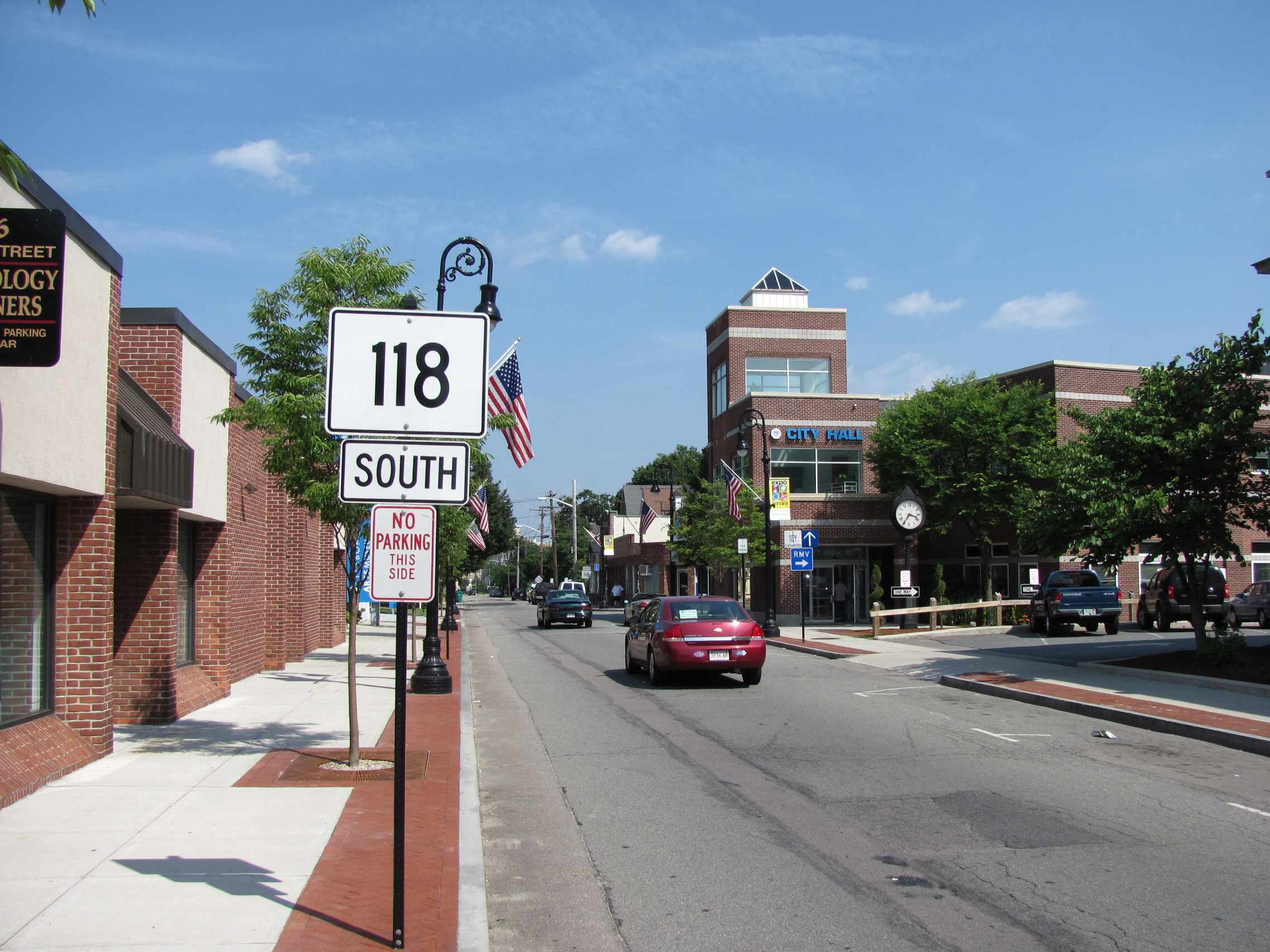
Route 118 southbound in Attleboro

In Rehoboth, the route heads northward, turning shortly westward along Brook Street before turning north on Moulton Street, which turns into Bay State Road near the town center before crossing U.S. Route 44. Route 118 then becomes Anawan Street, passing northward until it meets Tremont Street in North Rehoboth. The route then turns westward before bearing northwestward on Park Street into Attleboro. Park Street passes through Briggs Corner and passing the Shrine of Our Lady of La Salette, known for its massive display of Christmas lights. The route then splits between Park Street (Southbound) and Emory Street (Northbound). The southbound side passes Sturdy Memorial Hospital and the City Hall before both streets end at Route 123, just east of the main rail route between Boston and Providence.

== Major intersections ==
The entire route is in Bristol County.

Location	mi	km	Destinations	Notes
Swansea	0.00	0.00	US 6 (Grand Army of the Republic Highway) to I-195 – Swansea, Somerset	Southern terminus
Rehoboth	7.80	12.55	US 44 (Winthrop Street) – Taunton, Cape Cod, Providence, RI	
Attleboro	16.88	27.17	Route 123 (Pleasant Street / Park Street) to Route 152 – Norton, Brockton, South Attleboro, Pawtucket, RI	Northern terminus
1.000 mi = 1.609 km; 1.000 km = 0.621 mi
