= The Apex Companies =

Holding company based in Rhode Island

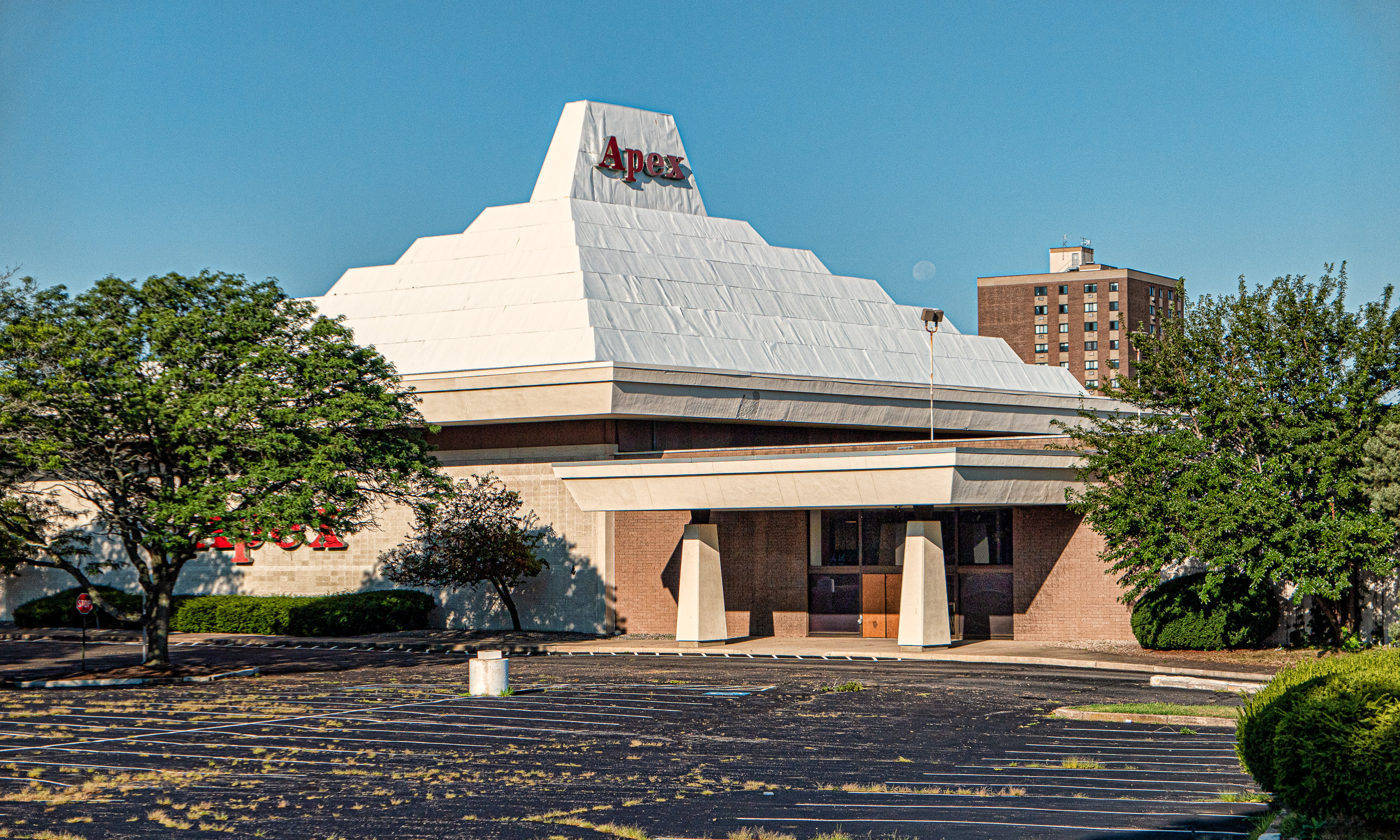
Apex Department Store Building in Pawtucket, Rhode Island

The Pawtucket, Rhode Island–based Apex Companies is a holding company that at different times since its founding had retail, online retail, commercial and residential real estate development, real estate management, specialty, wholesale and manufacturing businesses in New England. In the late 20th and early 21st Centuries, The Apex Companies was centered on its retail division, Apex Stores, which includes apexstores.com, a discount department store and the Apex Tire & Service Center, located in Pawtucket.

== History ==
The Apex Companies were founded by Albert Pilavin in 1924. Apex started as a tire retreading, automotive service and manufacturing business. According to company lore, Pilavin chose the name Apex because his initials were A.P., as well as the name's suggestion of "highest point or peak."

The 1938 New England hurricane destroyed Apex buildings in Providence, Rhode Island, and A. Pilavin moved all Apex Companies operations to Pawtucket. To accommodate early growth, the tire business was separated from the retail store and the manufacturing operations creating the Apex Tire & Service Center. The Apex Companies operated a retail store on Central Avenue in Pawtucket until it opened and moved to the Apex Building in Pawtucket in 1969.

An Apex Card was started in the 1930s as one of the first customer retail discount card programs in the United States. The Apex Card grew from being a discount card into a credit card and loyalty program. It continues as ApexAdvantage.

In the 1960s, the Apex retail division opened an additional department store in Warwick, Rhode Island and then about 1980 another store in the Swansea Mall in Swansea, Massachusetts. The Warwick and Swansea stores closed in 2001.

Apex opened apexstores.com in 1996 as one of the first online retail stores.

== Apex Department Stores ==
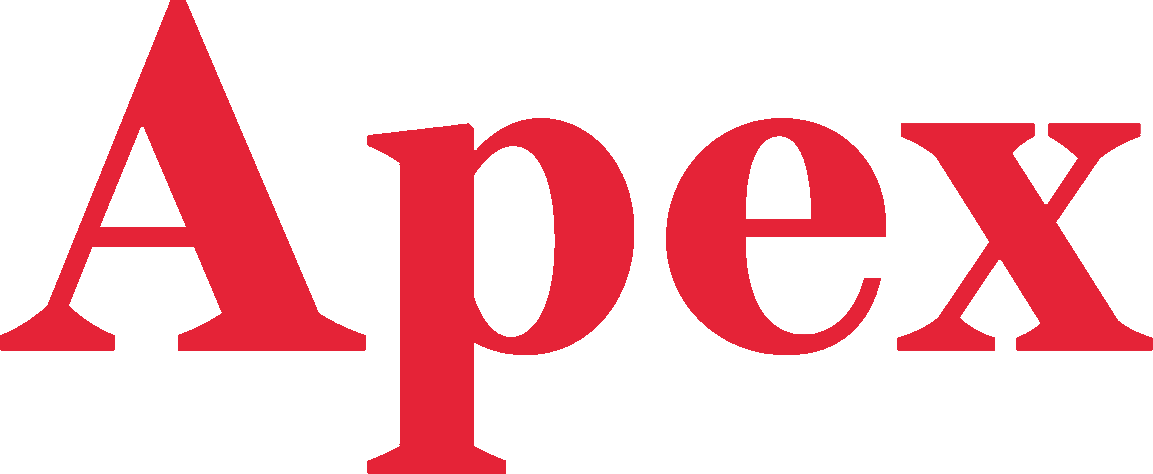
Apex stores logo

The company's main store in Pawtucket, Rhode Island, is a widely recognized local landmark. It was designed by Andrew Geller in 1969 as a side project while working in the employ of Raymond Loewy. The building's distinctive ziggurat roof was designed to get around local sign ordinances, as well as attract attention from nearby Interstate 95. The pyramid design also reflects the company name "Apex," meaning "summit." The building's floor plan features large amounts of undivided floor space, which results in the entire floor being visible to shoppers. The store in Warwick also had a similar looking pyramid building.

At the company's peak, Apex had three stores In Pawtucket, Warwick, Rhode Island, and Swansea, Massachusetts (at the Swansea Mall) until 2001 when all of the Apex stores except the one in Pawtucket closed. However, the Apex store in Pawtucket was severely downgraded. The Swansea Mall store opened in the early 1980s and closed in 2001. The Warwick and Pawtucket stores both had Apex branded auto centers. The Apex auto center in Warwick closed in 2001 along with the store while the Pawtucket auto center is still in use.

As the Apex company shrank due to financial hard times, the building has been the subject of continued speculation as to its future, with some insisting it is an eyesore, and others claiming it is an example of outstanding architecture and a true landmark worth preserving. The City of Pawtucket has made multiple outreach attempts to acquire the building and site, floating the possibility of acquiring it through eminent domain in October 2020. In December 2021, the City of Pawtucket closed a $17,693,500 deal with The Apex Companies to purchase five properties in the city.

In March 2025, wind damage and general deterioration led to the removal of the pyramid, which was a façade over the structurally-sound roof.
