= Cumming Corporation =

Project management company

Cumming Group
- Industry: Construction Management, Consulting, Cost Estimating, Project Management
- Founded: 1996
- Founder: Finlay Cumming
- Headquarters: New York, New York, United States
- Area served: International
- Key people: Derek Hutchison (President, CEO)
- Services: Program, Project and Construction Management; Cost Management and Estimating
- Number of employees: 1,500+ staff members worldwide (2022)
- Website: cumming-group.com

Cumming Group is a privately held international project management and cost consulting firm with a focus on construction in the advanced manufacturing, education, healthcare, themed entertainment, and hospitality sectors, among others. In 2017, the international consultancy generated an estimated $117 million in professional fees on more than $4 billion in construction.

The company is registered in California as "Cumming Management Group, Inc."

== History ==
In 1996, Finlay Cumming established Cumming LLC in Southern California. Its first major project was the providing cost consulting for Paris Las Vegas resort in 1997.

Between 2002 and 2006, Cumming opened new offices in Northern California, Colorado, Nevada, Florida, Arizona, Texas, and Georgia. Later in 2006, Cumming was named to Engineering News-Record's listing of the Top 100 CM-for-Fee firm in the United States, and continues to receive the honor, ranking in the top 40 every year since.

In 2007, the firm officially incorporated as Cumming Corporation and a year later in 2008, Cumming acquired Construction Controls Group (CCG), a Los Angeles-based program and project/construction management business. CCG, founded by Lisa Sacha in the 1990s, operated for two years as "CCG, a division of Cumming Group" then transitioned to the Cumming Corporation name.

Shortly after the acquisition of CCG, Cumming acquired Southern Management Group (SMG), a South Carolina-based firm with more than 20 years of experience in program and project/construction management.

Later in 2008, after several years working abroad, Cumming established Cumming International and opened its first overseas office in Abu Dhabi. According to Cumming press releases, Alastair Burns was "President of Cumming's international division from 2008", with Hatham Al-Ani serving as managing director of project management for the MENA (Middle East and North Africa) region. The office in the Khalediya area of Abu Dhabi was supplemented by another in Dubai, which moved from Emaar Square to TECOM in 2014.

Opening its New York office in 2013 brought Cumming Corporation to a total of twenty US offices, in addition to Abu Dhabi.

Cumming was acquired by private equity investors Tailwind Capital in 2016.

=== British acquisitions, 2016–2021 ===
In Britain, Cumming acquired GB Fitzsimon in 2016, building surveyors Mellersh & Harding Building Consultancy (MHBC) in late 2018, construction consultancy Prosurv Consult in 2019, and TowerEight in February 2020.

According to a Cumming press release, then-CEO Finlay Cumming had worked at GB Fitzsimon (founded in 1989) earlier in his career. MHBC was founded in 2007. Cumming executive vice president Derek Hutchison had worked previously at a client of MHBC, and stated at the time that Cumming had been "working alongside them [MHBC] for several years". The combined business operated under the name MHBC Cumming Group until 2021. Prosurv Consult was founded in 2004 and based in Stoke-on-Trent. After the acquisition, Prosurv continued to operate for some time as an independent subsidiary of Cumming Europe Ltd. TowerEight was a London-based project management and cost consultancy firm founded in 2011, having 59 staff in 2018, and a second office in Manchester that opened in 2018–2019. Will Smith, who had worked at Cumming and JB Fitzsimon in the early years, joined as chief executive for UK and Europe, also in February 2020.

TowerEight co-founder James Morris was appointed head of the new Cumming Group EMEA (Europe, Middle East, and Africa) in July 2021, having a combined staff of 120 people. Cumming EMEA announced that the constituent British brands Prosurv, MHBC Cumming Group, and TowerEight would change to the Cumming Group name, with headquarters in London.

Cumming acquired Dublin-based Scollard Doyle in September 2021.

=== Changes 2018–2021 ===
Meanwhile, in the US, Cumming merged its east-coast operations with New-York-based Lehrer LLC in 2018, forming a new division "Cumming Lehrer" headed by founder Peter Lehrer as divisional CEO, with Gavin Middleton of Lehrer and Derek Hutchison of Cumming as executive vice presidents. The merger brought Cumming to 700 employees across 31 offices.

In January 2020, long-time chief operating officer (COO) Mike Jensen retired. David Baird was appointed COO, and EVP Derek Hutchison was promoted to president. Finlay Cumming remained as CEO. In October of the same year, the company announced that, effective from 1 January 2021, Baird would be appointed CEO as part of a succession plan for Finlay Cumming, who would assume the role of executive chairman.

During 2020–2021, Cumming increased its focus on northwest USA. It acquired two Oregon-based businesses: PlanB Consulting (60 staff) in July 2020, and Inici Group early in 2021. In December 2020, new COO Finlay McLay relocated to Seattle to work alongside CEO Baird. In March 2021, Cumming announced that it would move its headquarters to Seattle.

In November 2021, New Mountain Capital announced an investment partnership with Cumming Group. Former owners Tailwind Capital stated that they "look forward to remaining a partner and shareholder".

=== Post-2021 growth ===
Growth through mergers and acquisitions continued in 2022 to 2023. Cardiff-based ChandlerKBS merged into Cumming in 2022, adding nine offices across Europe. Also acquired were Nova Partners (Northern California and northwest USA) RGM Kramer (Northern California) in 2022, and Amicon Management (Florida) in 2023.In 2024 Lafferty project management based in Dublin merged with the group adding offices across Ireland in Dublin, Cork and Galway

== Present ==
As of 2020, Cumming Group had more than 30 offices internationally with more than 950 employees. According to Engineering News-Record (ENR), Cumming Group continues to rank among the top 20 construction management firms on its annual listing of the Top 100 CM-for-Fee Firms in the United States.
