= 888 Seventh Avenue =

Office skyscraper in Manhattan, New York

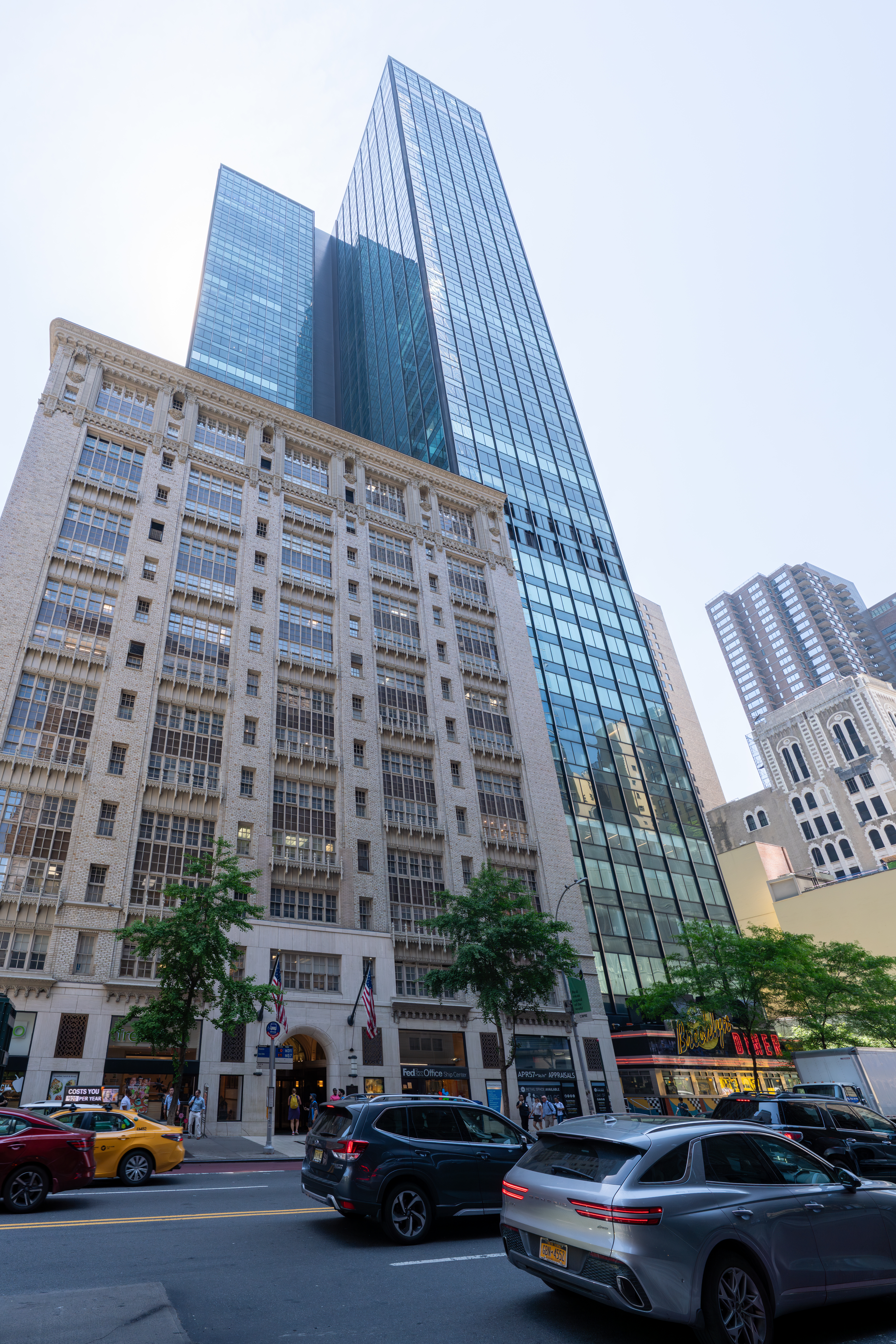
- 888 Seventh Ave's seen to the right and the to back of Rodin Studios
- Interactive map of the 888 Seventh Avenue area

General information
- Status: Completed
- Type: Office
- Coordinates: 40°45′55″N 73°58′51″W
- Completed: 1969
- Owner: Vornado Realty Trust

Height
- Roof: 628 ft (191 m)
- Top floor: 598 feet (182 m)

Technical details
- Floor count: 46
- Floor area: 873,599 sq ft (81,160.0 m^{2})
- Lifts/elevators: 20

Design and construction
- Architects: Emery Roth & Sons

888 Seventh Avenue is a 628 ft (191m) tall modern-style office skyscraper in Midtown Manhattan which was completed in 1969 and has 46 floors. Emery Roth & Sons designed the building. 888 Seventh Avenue is L-shaped in plan, with wings extending north to 57th Street and east to Seventh Avenue, around the adjacent Rodin Studios. It currently carries the Vornado Realty Trust corporate headquarters. Previously known as the Arlen Building, it had been named for the company responsible for its construction, Arlen Realty & Development Corporation. The Red Eye Grill is located in the building at street level.

Moed de Armas renovated the Lobby, Elevators & Plaza in 2006, cladding them with white marble. The HVAC was also extensively renovated and the building was later given gold certification by the Leadership in Energy and Environmental Design.

The building is assigned its own ZIP Code, 10106; it was one of 41 buildings in Manhattan that had their own ZIP Codes as of 2019.

== Tenants ==
- Fordham University
- The Fireman Hospitality Group
- Protiviti
- TPG Capital
- Casimir Capital
- Tulsiani Spectre Trust
- Pershing Square Capital Management
- Visium Asset Management
- Vornado Realty Trust
- Pura Vida Investments
- Lombard Odier Asset Management
- Drake Real Estate Partners
- Caravel Management
- United Talent Agency
- Corcoran Sunshine Marketing Group
- Cumming Corporation
- Schreck Rose Dapello Adams Berlin & Dunham
- Colbeck Capital

== See also ==
- List of tallest buildings in New York City
