= Best & Co. =

1879–1971 American retail clothing chain

Best & Co. was a department store founded in 1879 by Albert Best in New York City. The company initially sold clothing for infants and children, but later expanded to women's clothing and accessories. It was known for its "tastefully styled and proper women's clothes and its sturdy children's wear." Philip Le Boutillier served as president during the late 1930s. The store had expanded to 20 branches by 1966, when the company was acquired by McCrory's, who also operated Lerner Shops and S. Klein. In late-1970, McCrory's liquidated the company. At the time of its closing, the store had 1,200 employees.

== Flagship store ==
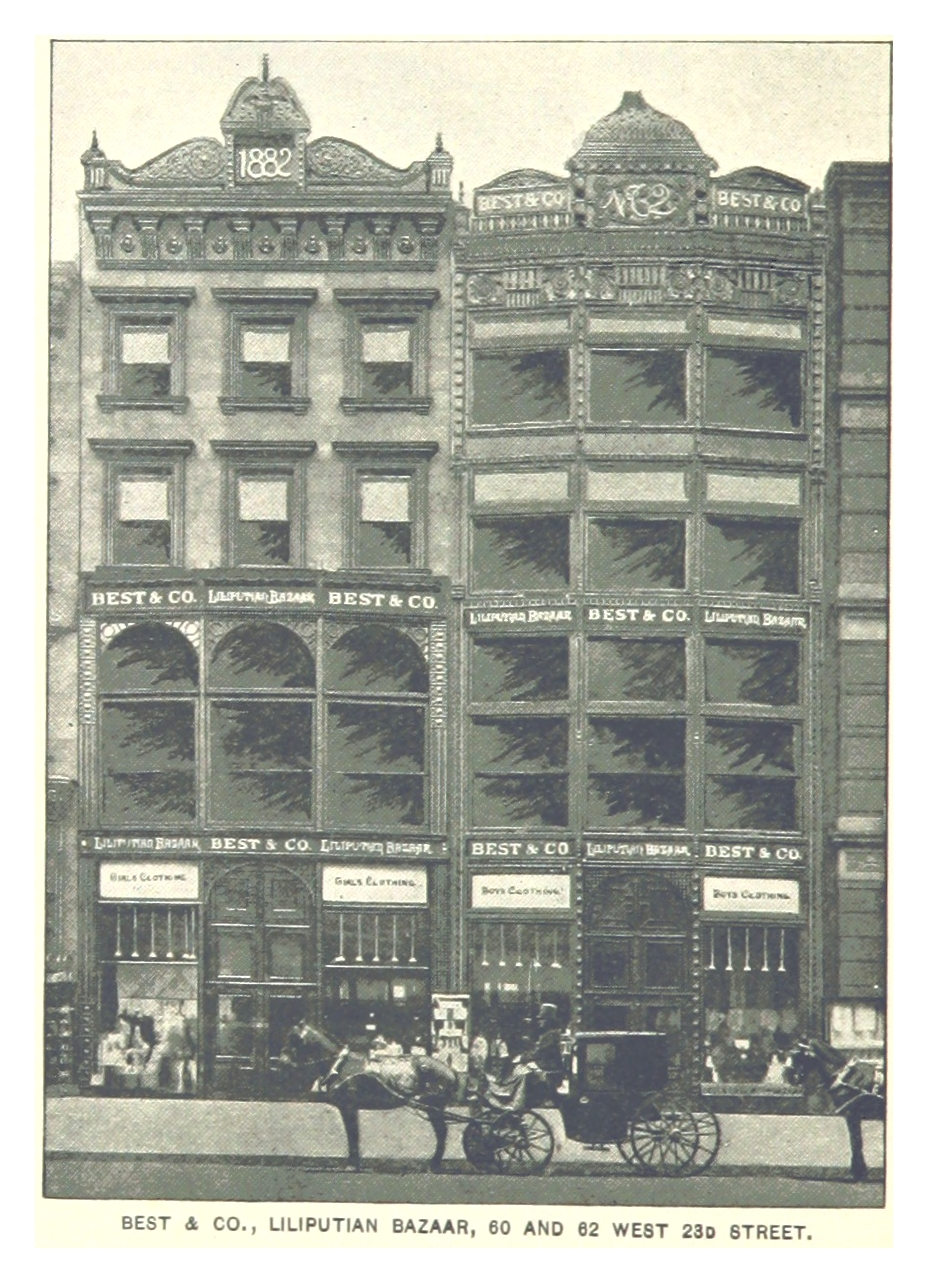
Best & Co. Liliputian Bazaar, 60 and 62 West 23rd Street

The flagship Best & Co. department store was originally located in the "Ladies' Mile" near Sixth Avenue and 23rd Street. In 1908, Best & Co. spent $500,000 to purchase the former Engineer's Club at 372 Fifth Avenue at 35th Street for a new store, joining an elite group of merchants to locate in that section of Fifth Avenue in the early 1900s, including B. Altman (365 Fifth Avenue), Gorham (390 Fifth Avenue), and Tiffany's (401 Fifth Avenue). This limestone building later became the Bond Clothing Stores flagship when Best moved farther up the avenue and was later converted to apartments. Its final 12-story flagship store was located at Fifth Avenue and 51st Street, directly north of St. Patrick's Cathedral. The store replaced 645 Fifth Avenue and the Union Club of the City of New York. After it closed in late 1970, the white marble building was torn down and the Olympic Tower was built in its place.

== Branches ==
Best & Co. was also in the forefront of opening stores in upscale suburban areas long before its competitors. It opened its first branch locations in the late 1920s and early 1930s, in Manhasset, Long Island (1928); Mamaroneck, New York (1930); East Orange, New Jersey (1930); and Jenkintown, Pennsylvania (1936, closed 1937). By 1938, when it opened its initial Washington, D.C. store at 4433 Connecticut Ave., NW, it had branches operating in suburban New York, Cleveland, Detroit, Boston, and Philadelphia. On August 28, 1940, it opened a branch in Winnetka, IL, a suburb of Chicago. During the late 1940s-early 1950s a branch location opened at Arlington Blvd. and So. Glebe Road, in Arlington, Virginia, a suburb of Washington, D.C. In 1955, the main Washington D.C. store moved to new quarters; a 15,000-square-foot (1,400 m^{2}) store at 4020 Wisconsin Ave., NW. In 1966, when Ira Guilden was elected chairman, 20 branch locations were in operation.

In October 1970, McCrory executives decided to liquidate Best's and close all its stores. At the time of Best's closure, there were 12 branch stores in operation. Despite the new owners liquidating the company in late 1970, a new store was planned, built, and fixtured as an outparcel to the upscale Fashion Center in Paramus, New Jersey. This store also featured a new script logo for the company, but sat empty for a couple of years until a Britt's store opened using all the fixtures and displays originally intended for Best & Co.

== In popular culture ==
The front of Best & Co. appeared in The Godfather, when Michael Corleone and Kay Adams are Christmas shopping.
