= Dartmouth Mall =

Shopping mall in Dartmouth, Massachusetts, U.S.

- Location: Dartmouth, Massachusetts, United States
- Coordinates: 41.6417°N 70.9911°W
- Opened: 1971
- Developer: Arlen Realty
- Manager: PREIT
- Num. of stores: 54
- Num. of anchor tenants: 4
- Floor area: 670,940 sq ft (62,000 m^{2})
- Floors: 1 (2 in JCPenney and Macy's)
- Website: shopdartmouthmall.com

The Dartmouth Mall is a one-level shopping mall located off US 6 and Faunce Corner Road in Dartmouth, Massachusetts, in the United States. Currently anchoring the mall are Aldi, Ulta Beauty, Burlington, JCPenney, and Macy's. The mall also features a food court and movie theater. It is managed by PREIT.

== History ==
Dartmouth Mall (originally known as North Dartmouth Mall; the name was changed in the 1990s after the town abandoned officially using the name) was constructed during the years 1969 to 1971 on the site of the 9-Hole Golf Course Paskamansett Links. The town of Dartmouth had zoned all of the land on Route 6 for commercial development, and the North Dartmouth Mall was the first large-scale retail facility constructed along the route. When the mall opened, it featured a 3-screen cinema, 72 stores, and nine restaurants. Anchoring the mall were Zayre, Sears, and The Outlet Company department store, as well as mini-anchors Cherry & Webb and Woolworth. The former Cherry & Webb and Woolworth's locations have since been subdivided. The Zayre chain was purchased by Ames in the late 1980s, and as a result became an Ames store. The Outlet Company went out of business (along with the rest of the company) in 1980 and was replaced with JCPenney. The former Ames was demolished and replaced with a Filene's in 2004 (which became a Macy's in 2006 when Macy's bought the Filene's chain).

Since opening, the surrounding area has expanded dramatically. Many plazas have sprung up around it, including four to the west along State Road (Rte. 6) and three along Faunce Corner Road between Rte. 6 and I-195.

In early 2000 the mall went through a dynamic change including new entrances, signage and full interior demolition, and renovation. A food court was added. The theaters have been expanded to 12 screens, and are operated by AMC.

In January 2019, it was announced that Sears would be closing in the fall. On June 19, 2019, it was announced that Burlington would be replacing Sears. In spring 2020, Burlington opened.

On January 7, 2021, Aldi announced that it would be joining the complex during the fourth quarter of 2021.

== List of anchor stores ==
| Name | No. of floors | Year opened | Year closed | Notes |
|---|---|---|---|---|
| Burlington | 1 | 2020 | —N/a | Replaced half of Sears |
| Aldi | 1 | 2021 | —N/a | Replaced half of Sears |
| JCPenney | 2 | 1982 | —N/a | Replaced The Outlet Company |
| The Outlet Company | 2 | 1971 | 1980 | Replaced by JCPenney |
| Filene's | 2 | 2004 | 2006 | Replaced Ames, later replaced by Macy's |
| Zayre | 1 | 1971 | 1990 | Replaced by Ames |
| Sears | 1 | 1971 | 2019 | Replaced by Burlington and Aldi |
| Macy's | 2 | 2006 | —N/a | Replaced Filene's |
| Ames | 1 | 1990 | 2002 | Replaced by Filene's |
