= Tishman =

Tishman is a surname. Notable people with the surname include:

- Alan V. Tishman (1917–2004), American real estate developer
- John L. Tishman (1926–2016), American real estate developer
- Nimrod Tishman (born 1991), Israeli basketball player
- Paul Tishman (1900–1996), American real estate developer
- Robert Tishman (1916-2010), American real estate developer

== See also ==
- Tishman Realty & Construction
- Tishman Speyer Properties
