= 660 Fifth Avenue =

Office skyscraper in Manhattan, New York

- Former names: Tishman Building, 666 Fifth Avenue

General information
- Status: Completed
- Type: Office
- Location: 660–666 Fifth Avenue; Manhattan, New York 10103, United States
- Coordinates: 40°45′37″N 73°58′34″W
- Completed: 1957
- Opening: November 25, 1957
- Cost: $40 million
- Owner: Brookfield Properties

Height
- Roof: 483 ft (147 m)
- Top floor: 444 feet (135 m)

Technical details
- Floor count: 41
- Floor area: 1,463,892 sq ft (136,000.0 m^{2})
- Lifts/elevators: 24 (20 passenger, 4 freight)

Design and construction
- Architect: Carson & Lundin
- Developer: Tishman Realty & Construction
- Structural engineer: Victor Mayper
- Main contractor: Tishman Realty & Construction

Website
- sixsixtyfifthave.com

660 Fifth Avenue (formerly 666 Fifth Avenue and the Tishman Building) is a 41-story office building on the west side of Fifth Avenue between 52nd and 53rd Streets in Midtown Manhattan, New York City, United States. The office tower was designed by Carson & Lundin and built for its developer, Tishman Realty and Construction, from 1955 to 1957.

When it was completed, the building featured a prominent red neon display of the number 666 at the top which could be seen from various locations in the city. It had a facade of embossed aluminum panels which were originally lit by the "Tower of Light" designed by Abe Feder. The interior had a T-shaped atrium open to the public, with retail space, a lobby extending from Fifth Avenue, and a waterfall sculpture by Isamu Noguchi. The upper floors had a variety of office tenants, including those in the law, finance, and publishing industries. In the early 2020s, the lobby and office spaces were rebuilt and the facade was replaced with one containing glass panels.

Tishman sold the building when the corporation dissolved in 1976. The building was sold to Sumitomo Realty & Development in the late 1990s, and Tishman Speyer bought it in 2000. Tishman sold the skyscraper yet again to Kushner Properties in 2007. Kushner Properties struggled with financing throughout the late 2000s and mid-2010s, even contemplating replacing it with a taller tower. Brookfield Properties leased the whole building in August 2018 and subsequently hired Kohn Pedersen Fox to extensively renovate the building through 2022. As part of the renovation, the building was renumbered to 660 Fifth Avenue.

== Site ==
660 Fifth Avenue is in the Midtown Manhattan neighborhood of New York City, United States. It faces Fifth Avenue to the east, 52nd Street to the south, and 53rd Street to the north. The land lot is mostly rectangular and covers 61,755 square feet (5,737.2 m^{2}), with a frontage of 200 feet (61 m) on Fifth Avenue and a depth of 315 feet (96 m). The 53rd Street frontage measures 300 feet (91 m) while the 52nd Street frontage measures 315 feet (96 m). The building is on the same block as the CBS Building, 31 West 52nd Street, the 21 Club, and 53rd Street Library to the west. Other nearby buildings include the Museum of Modern Art and Saint Thomas Church to the north; Paley Park to the northeast; 12 East 53rd Street to the east; the Olympic Tower and 647 and 651 Fifth Avenue to the southeast; and 650 Fifth Avenue and 75 Rockefeller Plaza to the south. The building is assigned its own ZIP Code, 10103; it was one of 41 buildings in Manhattan that had their own ZIP Codes as of 2019.

Upscale residences were constructed around Fifth Avenue following the American Civil War. The lot at 660 Fifth Avenue had previously held the William K. Vanderbilt House, an 1882 châteauesque mansion designed by Richard Morris Hunt for William Kissam Vanderbilt. The mansion had been demolished in 1926 and replaced with a 12-story office building by developer Benjamin Winter. Stanford White designed a mansion for William Kissam Vanderbilt II's family at number 666, which was completed in 1908. The current office building at 660 Fifth Avenue replaced nine structures, including William K. Vanderbilt II's mansion and Winter's office building. The other structures included some brownstones and a pair of six-story commercial buildings. The site was also occupied by a parking lot just prior to the current building's development.

== Architecture ==
660 Fifth Avenue, originally the Tishman Building at 666 Fifth Avenue, was designed by Carson and Lundin and built by its developer, Tishman Realty & Construction. It is one of the remaining office skyscrapers that the firm designed in the mid-20th century in Manhattan. The building is 483 ft (147 m) tall and was designed with 39 stories. Other contractors involved in the building's construction were structural engineer Victor Mayper, mechanical engineers Cosentini Associates, and electrical consultants Eitingon & Schlossberg.

=== Facade ===
==== Original facade ====
The Tishman Building originally had an aluminum curtain wall covering 8 acres (3.2 ha). Described in The New York Times as the world's largest aluminum curtain wall, it consisted of nearly 3,000 spandrel panels, (Note: Progressive Architecture states that 2,950 panels were installed.) which were installed between windows on different stories. Each panel measured about 7 by 11 feet (2.1 by 3.4 m) and weighed 225 pounds (102 kg). The Reynolds Metals Company prefabricated the pieces of the facade at their plant in Louisville, Kentucky. The panels were anodized and contained small embossed rhombuses to create the impression of a textured surface. These panels were mounted on the facade from the inside and then bolted to pieces of steel that had been welded to the superstructure. The effect was meant to resemble medieval armor. Before the original aluminum curtain wall was removed, Brookfield Properties' construction director said that occupants could feel wind coming through the panels because they were so porous. Part of the ground-story facade along Fifth Avenue was replaced in 1999 with a 25-foot-tall (7.6 m) glass wall to make the retail space more visible.

The vertical aluminum mullions contained embedded pieces of porcelain enamel and white structural glass. The enamel or white glass strips were 20 inches (510 mm) wide and were flanked by 3-inch (76 mm) strips of aluminum, giving the mullions a total width of 26 inches (660 mm). The window widths varied from 6.875 to 7.375 feet (2.096 to 2.248 m). The window panes between the mullions contained a gray tint for glare reduction. Each window contained two fixed sidelights flanking a movable center pane. The center panes were designed to pivot so window cleaners could clean the panes from the inside.

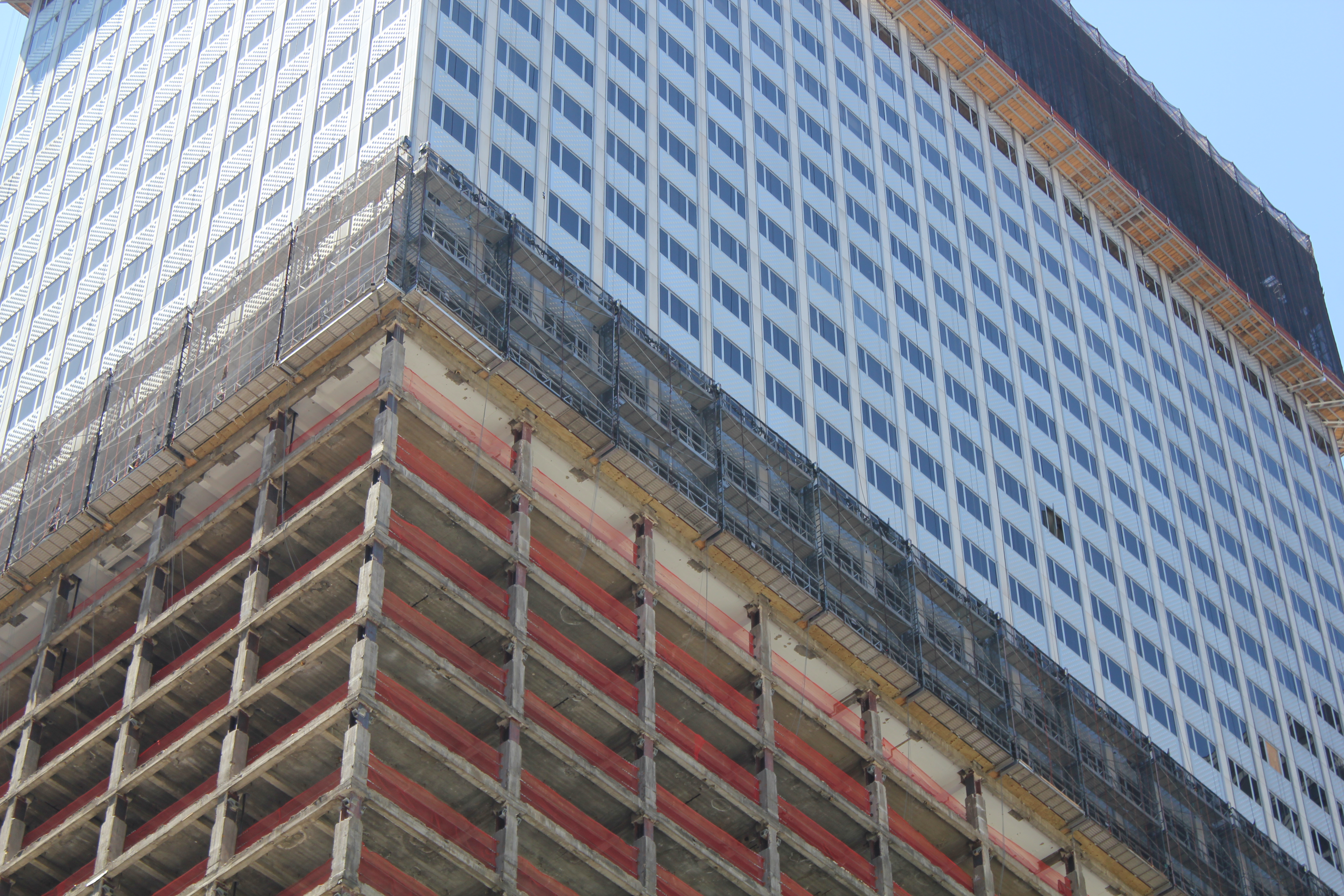
Detail of upper stories, with the original facade above and a stripped-down superstructure below

When the building opened, it had a lighting system designed by Abe Feder. Described by the Real Estate Record and Guide as a "Tower of Light", the system consisted of 72 reflector lamps mounted on the building's setbacks. The light fixtures turned 666 Fifth Avenue into what architect Robert A. M. Stern characterized as "a landmark that received wide comment". The system was capable of 9.7 million candlepower. It was so bright that, from September to November 1959, the system was completely darkened to prevent interference with bird migration.

A prominent 666 address was emblazoned on the top of the building when it opened. In 2002, the 666 address on the side of the building was replaced with a Citigroup logo after Citigroup became the building's largest tenant. Although similar signage normally would not be allowed in Manhattan, the signage was permitted under a grandfather clause since the original 666 signage was erected before the ban was enacted. While some groups such as the Municipal Art Society took no issue with the signage change, preservationists including Stern condemned it as flaunting and ahistorical. The three "6" digits from the original sign were placed in storage in case they were ever needed.

==== Renovated facade ====
Between 2020 and 2022, the facade of 660 Fifth Avenue was replaced as part of a renovation designed by Kohn Pedersen Fox. The new facade consists of windows extending the full height of each story, measuring 11 feet (3.4 m) tall and 19 feet (5.8 m) wide. These panels do not contain any mullions, and each panel is cut from a single pane of glass. The glass panels contain insulation, as opposed to the original facade, which was not insulated. The new facade triples the amount of window space at 660 Fifth Avenue. According to owner Brookfield Properties, these would be the "largest unitized windows in North America". The renovation also includes terraces on the three sides facing the surrounding roads. These terraces are on the 8th, 10th, 11th, and 15th stories.

=== Interior ===
As designed, the Tishman Building had 1,245,000 square feet (115,700 m^{2}) of space, of which 1 million square feet (93,000 m^{2}) was available for rent. The base consists of the 14 lowest floors, which each originally had an area of 28,000 to 56,000 square feet (2,600 to 5,200 m^{2}). The tower floors constitute the 24 highest floors, which each had an area of 18,000 square feet (1,700 m^{2}). As part of the early-2020s renovation, some of the interior spaces of the upper floors were being removed to create some double-height spaces.

==== Mechanical features ====
The steel superstructure, weighing 13,000 short tons (12,000 long tons; 12,000 t), was constructed using bolts rather than rivets, as a bolting operation would require only half as many workers as a riveting operation did. Also included in the construction was 40,000 cubic yards (31,000 m^{3}) of concrete. 660 Fifth Avenue was initially retrofitted with a 400-short-ton (360-long-ton; 360 t) electric refrigeration plant in the sub-cellar, providing cool air to the ground-level stores, and a 3,000-short-ton (2,700-long-ton; 2,700 t) steam-turbine refrigeration plant on the roof, serving all other floors. The refrigeration plants were described by The New York Times as having a similar cooling capacity to sixty thousand ice blocks weighing 100 pounds (45 kg) each. In addition, there was a 70-space parking lot in the basement, accessible by an elevator on 53rd Street. A new air-supply system was installed in the early 2020s.

When the building was constructed in the 1950s, it had 20 passenger elevators and two freight elevators manufactured by Westinghouse Electric Corporation. The passenger elevators were arranged in three banks and the freight elevators had their own bank. The elevators were controlled electronically, a relatively new technology at the time of construction, and the cabs had light sensors that signaled the doors to close as the last passenger entered or left a cab. The building also had 5 million feet (1,500,000 m) of electrical wiring when it was completed. Illumination was provided by 10,000 movable lamps.

==== Atrium and lobby ====
Originally, 660 Fifth Avenue had a T-shaped atrium that opened directly to 52nd Street, 53rd Street, and Fifth Avenue, with glass storefronts inside. The atrium contained a north–south passageway between 52nd and 53rd Streets, which was 100 feet (30 m) west of the Fifth Avenue facade and measured 30 feet (9.1 m) wide. In addition, two west–east passageways connected that hallway with Fifth Avenue. The storefronts surrounded the atrium and an additional storefront was between the parallel Fifth Avenue passageways (see 660 Fifth Avenue § Retail tenants). The atrium, as well as the surrounding sidewalks, were paved with 3-by-3-foot (0.91 by 0.91 m) blocks colored in a buff hue. The space was lit by incandescent lamps embedded in the ceiling. During a 1999 renovation, the atrium was enclosed when revolving doors were installed at its entrances. The Fifth Avenue passageways were eliminated in 2000 and became a storefront.

660 Fifth Avenue's original lobby was west of the section of the atrium extending from Fifth Avenue. It measured 100 feet (30 m) deep and varied in width from 85 feet (26 m) on the eastern wall to 75 feet (23 m) on the western walls. It was initially clad with red marble walls and had a floor covering with red, white, and black tiles. Wood paneling was installed in 1998, concealing or replacing the red marble wall surfaces, and the floor surface was replaced with a monochrome granite pattern. When the main entrance was relocated to 53rd Street in 2000, a 70-by-70-foot (21 by 21 m) reception lobby was placed at the 53rd Street entrance. The ceiling was originally decorated with a set of horizontal "fins" finished in baked enamel. The four banks of elevators were at the center of the lobby, oriented in a north–south axis. The elevator lobbies contained white-marble cladding and metal elevator doors. The elevator lobbies were lit by fluorescent cathode tubes above translucent ceiling panels. As part of the 2020s renovation, the lobby was redecorated in white marble with wood paneling, and a destination dispatch system was installed for the elevators.

The original design included a wall with the artwork "Landscape of Clouds", a waterfall designed by artist Isamu Noguchi. As designed, the wall containing the waterfall was 40 feet (12 m) wide and separated the lobby and the atrium. Made of structural glass and lit by hidden spotlights, the waterfall wall was crossed by stainless steel fins that extended the entire height of the lobby. The "fins" ranged from 4 to 12 inches (100 to 300 mm) deep. The work was inspired in part by a wall that Noguchi had designed for Carson and Lundin in Texas, which had not been installed. When Robert Carson of the firm suggested creating steel fins on the lobby ceiling and installing an accompanying waterfall, Noguchi was "horrified at the idea of such arbitrary use" and offered to remodel the ceiling as part of the cost of the waterfall. This artwork was proposed to be removed in 1999 but was ultimately retained. The removal of this artwork was again contemplated in early 2020, and the work was ultimately disassembled the same year.

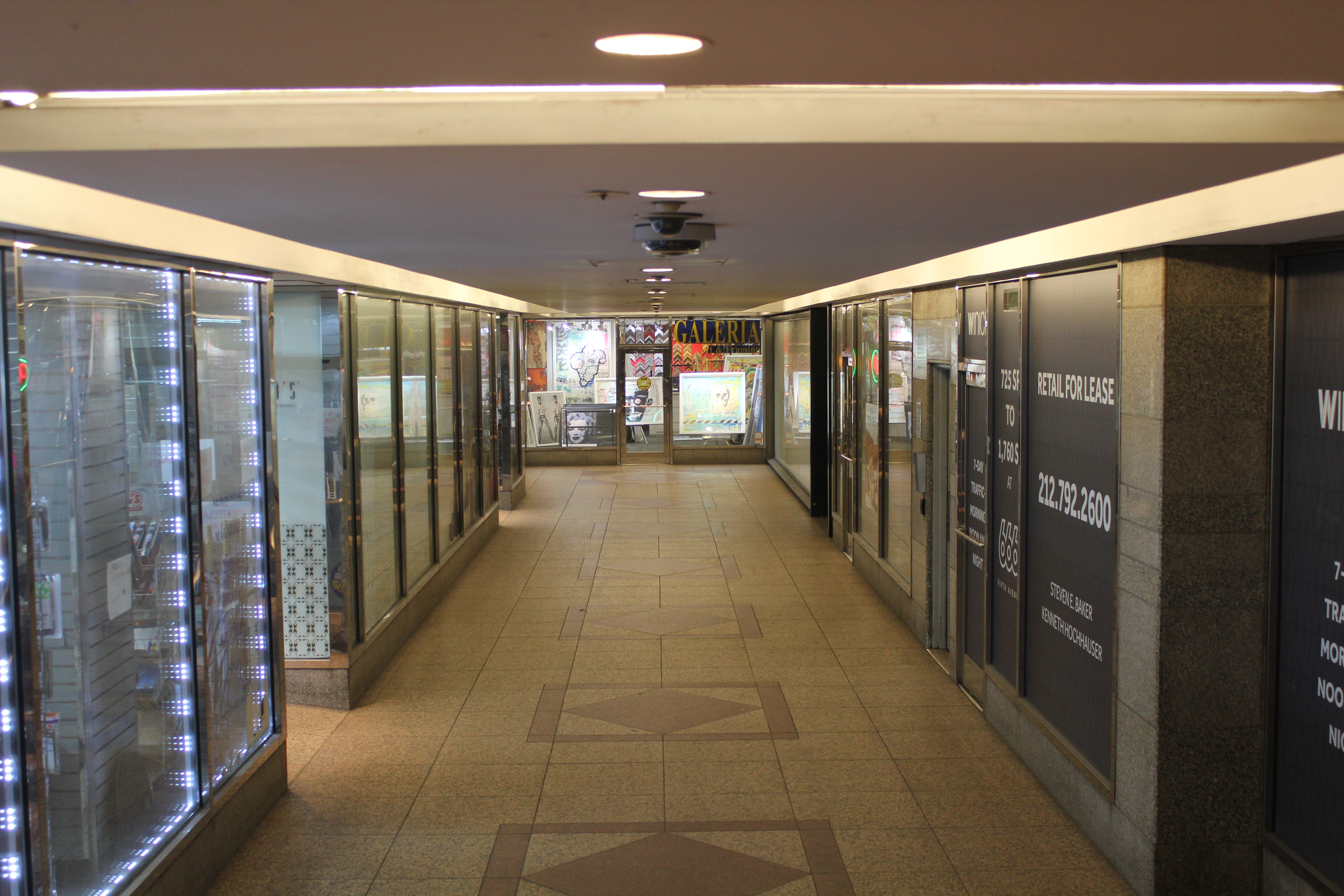
Shopping arcade just below 660 Fifth Avenue, leading to the Fifth Avenue/53rd Street station

The building contains an entrance to the New York City Subway's Fifth Avenue/53rd Street station, which is served by the E, F, and <F> trains. The entrance initially led to the atrium. During a renovation in 1999, the subway entrance was relocated so it could be accessed directly from 53rd Street.

==== Upper floors ====
As built, the office space contained prefabricated panels of movable steel walls, developed jointly by Aetna Steel Products and Tishman. Aetna made the panels at its plant in Pottsville, Pennsylvania. The panels were made of about 27,000 panels of 3-inch (76 mm), 20-gauge steel, ranging between 6 and 48 inches (150 and 1,220 mm) long. They were secured to the floors using studs, then they were clipped to the ceiling. The usage of prefabricated steel panels, as opposed to more typical plaster walls, allowed an additional 16,000 square feet (1,500 m^{2}) of interior space and removed the need to use cement and sand for manufacturing plaster walls. Other advantages of the panels were that they could be easily removed and recycled, they could not be cracked, and any alterations for mechanical systems would not create rubble or other debris. The facade had been designed so the office space could be partitioned into sections with a minimum width of 7.5 feet (2.3 m). During the 2020s renovation, some of the columns were removed, and the ceilings were raised, to provide more wide-open office space. The mechanical systems were also replaced.

The penthouse was occupied by the Top of the Sixes restaurant, designed by Raymond Loewy and operated by Stouffer's. The restaurant had 300 seats and was decorated in a French Provincial style. The restaurant was the first of its kind in Manhattan to open since the Rainbow Room had opened at 30 Rockefeller Plaza in 1934. Top of the Sixes closed in 1996. It was replaced with the Grand Havana Room, a cigar bar private club. The Grand Havana Room was the site of an August 2, 2016, meeting between Paul Manafort, Rick Gates, and Russian-Ukrainian Konstantin Kilimnik. The meeting drew the attention of the Mueller investigation due to Manafort giving Kilimnik polling data at the meeting and asking Kilimnik to pass the data to pro-Russian Ukrainians Serhiy Lyovochkin and Rinat Akhmetov.

== History ==
=== Planning and construction ===
The west side of Fifth Avenue between 52nd and 53rd Streets was initially acquired by department store chain Lord & Taylor in 1945. Starrett & van Vleck were to develop a new Lord & Taylor flagship store on the site, replacing an existing structure at Fifth Avenue and 38th Street. At the time, the existing store did not have enough space for Lord & Taylor's operations, and the company planned to build a skyscraper with a new flagship at the first ten stories. By 1948, there were rumors that Lord & Taylor had abandoned their plans to erect a new flagship, but the company denied the allegations. Dorothy Shaver, president of the store, ultimately canceled the plan in 1952, citing an "abnormally high cost of building and equipping a large store" within Manhattan.

==== Early plans ====
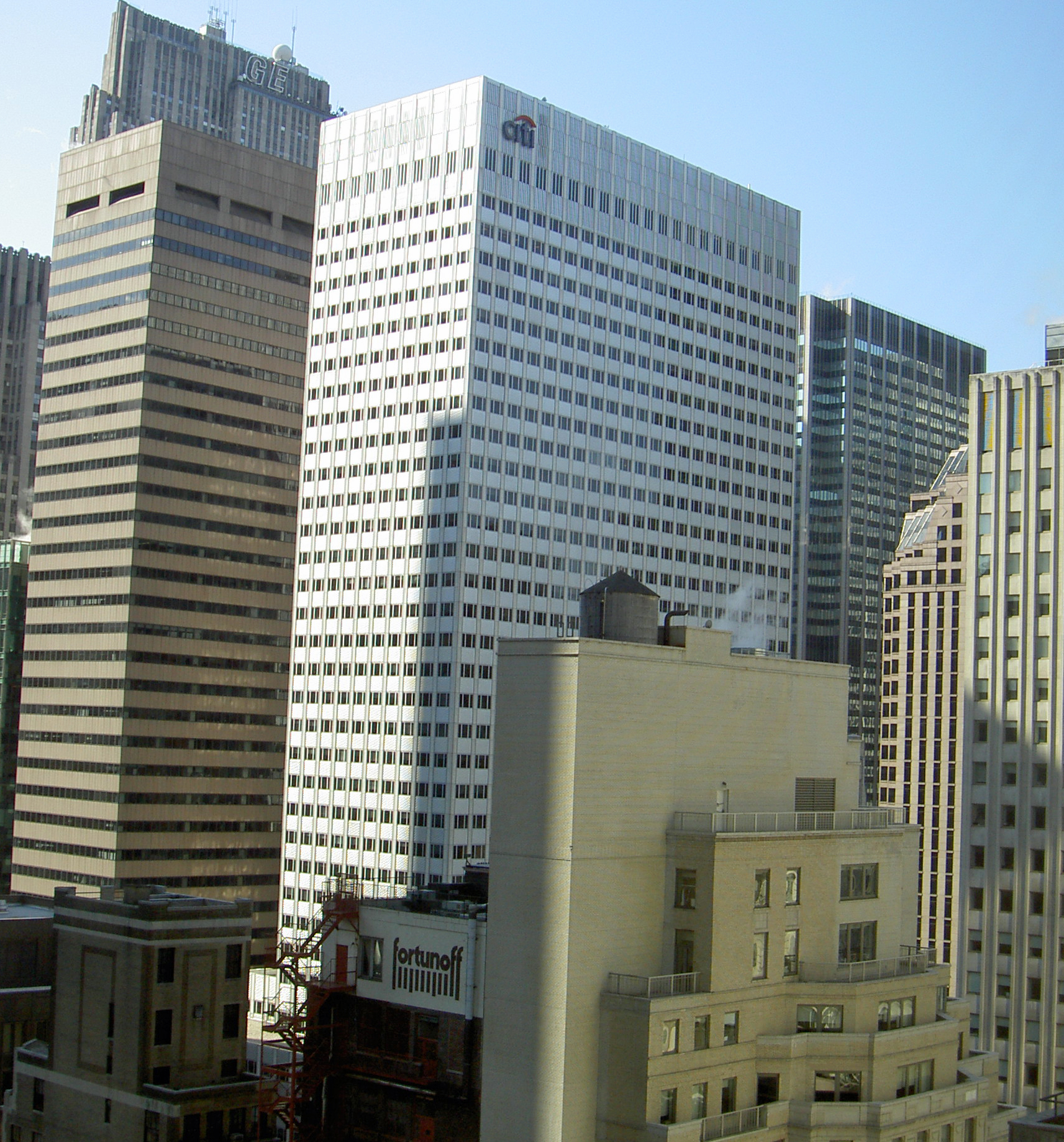
The original steel facade of 666 Fifth Avenue as seen from a nearby building

Tishman Realty and Construction acquired the Lord & Taylor site between 52nd and 53rd Streets in November 1954. Tishman reportedly paid $9 million for the site, measuring 200 by 300 feet (61 by 91 m). The company planned to erect a building of at least 34 stories and at least 1 million square feet (93,000 m^{2}) of space. The Tishman family originally wanted a limestone structure that imitated the design of the buildings at the nearby Rockefeller Center. Carson & Lundin were hired as architects the following month. The architects were simultaneously working on 600 Fifth Avenue at Rockefeller Center.

The Tishman family announced details of its planned 36-story office building in February 1955. Early plans called for using 6-foot (1.8 m) wide windows separated by 2.5-foot (0.76 m) limestone piers, significantly wider than the 4.5-foot (1.4 m) vertical divisions that were then commonplace. This would allow a wider variety of room sizes. Window openings would consist of two fixed sash windows as well as a vertically pivoting pane to allow window cleaners to wash the windows from the inside. Columns would be spaced 17 to 18 feet (5.2 to 5.5 m) apart and ceilings would be 11 feet (3.4 m) high; air conditioning would be installed to cool the offices. Also included in initial plans was a 30-foot-wide (9.1 m) public arcade between 52nd and 53rd Streets, running 100 feet (30 m) west of Fifth Avenue, which would not only draw retail traffic but also allow a public pedestrian shortcut. The arcade would contain an entrance to the Fifth Avenue/53rd Street subway station as well as a connection to Rockefeller Center's underground concourse via 75 Rockefeller Plaza.

Tishman Realty obtained title to the new building's site in May 1955 from Lord & Taylor parent company Associated Dry Goods. Tishman planned to raze some buildings shortly afterward, though other buildings could not be destroyed until the following February, when their tenants' leases expired. The same month, Collins Tuttle & Co. were named as renting agents. Carson & Lundin filed plans with the New York City Department of Buildings in June 1955, with the building expected to cost $18 million.

==== Final plans and construction ====
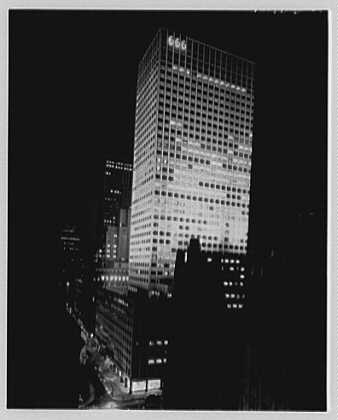
Night view of 666 Fifth Avenue in 1958, showing lighted "666" sign

The plans were changed in November 1955 after Tishman acquired the air rights over the adjoining Donnell Library at 53rd Street. The transfer of air rights enabled Tishman to expand the floor area by about 25 percent. The original proposal called for a 17-story base and a 21-story tower, but the plans were revised to allow for a 14-story base and 24-story tower with larger floor areas than in the original plan. Isamu Noguchi was hired to design the lobby in January 1956. At the time, the building was scheduled to be completed in May 1957. Demolition of the last structure on the site commenced in April 1956.

Tishman Realty & Construction arranged a $32 million construction loan that May with a consortium of banks led by the Irving Trust Company. Simultaneously, Prudential Financial agreed to purchase the building for $35 million and give Tishman an 88-year leaseback on the property. The last old structure was being demolished and the completion date had been pushed to September 1957. The plans had been changed to provide for an aluminum facade. Afterward, the site was excavated to a depth of 30 feet (9.1 m). Over 33,000 cubic yards (25,000 m^{3}) of rock and 27,000 cubic yards (21,000 m^{3}) of soil and debris was removed during a five-month span. The first columns of the steel framework were installed in September 1956. The construction attracted a substantial amount of interest. Steelworker Larry Weinmann, a former cartoonist, put cartoon decorations and depictions of the completed building onto the construction fence, and boxes of geraniums with notes of appreciation were placed outside the worksite in 1956. In addition, the building was decorated with a papier-mâché Santa Claus during Christmas 1956, and Easter decorations were placed on the worksite during Easter 1957.

Erection of the steelwork was completed in April 1957. At the time, the building was about 80 percent rented and the Reynolds Metals Company was shipping the facade panels from their Louisville factory. A large American flag, measuring 78 by 155 feet (24 by 47 m), was mounted outside the worksite in June 1957, only to rip as it was being unfurled. The Tishman Building officially opened on November 25, 1957, in a ceremony led by Robert F. Wagner Jr., the mayor of New York City. The building had cost $40 million. The Tishman Building won the Fifth Avenue Association's award for best new commercial building erected on the avenue during 1956 and 1957. The association praised the building's simple form, embossed facade spandrels, steel mullions, and exterior lighting system.

=== Late 20th century ===
==== 1960s to 1980s ====
666 Fifth Avenue was relatively unchanged until the mid-1970s, when Tishman Realty was being liquidated and converted into a partnership. The company was described by its president Robert Tishman as having a "negative net worth", and all of its properties had to be sold as a result. That October, the Equitable Life Assurance Society and Tishman agreed in principle that Tishman would sell off most of its office buildings, though Tishman would retain a 48 percent interest in 666 Fifth Avenue and a partial interest in several other buildings. Tishman dissolved in 1976 and the building was sold for $80 million (about $340 million in 2024). Prudential sold the land under 666 Fifth Avenue to Charlton Buildings in 1977. The building and land were immediately resold to Sherman and Edward B. Cohen of the firm Cohen Brothers.

In 1986, Integrated Resources Inc. bought the building for $320 million, although the sale excluded the underlying land. Integrated received a $20 million discount on the purchase price for asbestos abatement, part of which was used to remove asbestos from the boiler room. The company planned to finance the building using mostly zero-coupon bonds to account for the fact that, until rent increases were enacted, the building would receive a negative net income. In June 1987, a subsidiary of Japanese realty and development company Sumitomo Realty & Development purchased 666 Fifth Avenue and its underlying land from Integrated for $500 million. At the time, it was believed to be the second most expensive office-building sale in Manhattan history, behind that of 1251 Avenue of the Americas the previous year for $610 million. The sale was finalized in August 1987.

==== 1990s and early 2000s ====
The Top of the Sixes restaurant was closed in 1996, following the expiration of its lease, and replaced with the Grand Havana Room. Sumitomo started renovating the ground-story facade in late 1997, adding high glass walls. At the time, the company believed the public had come to perceive the ground-floor retail space as uninviting. This was followed in 1998 by the renovation of the building's lobby and lower floors, which included reconfiguring storefronts to accommodate large tenants on multiple levels. The $20 million project was the first major change for the building since its opening. Sumitomo planned to remove the Noguchi artwork, prompting protests from preservationists. The firm ultimately spent $1 million to renovate the ceiling installation and another $300,000 to restore the fountain. The subway entrance was also relocated, the atrium was enclosed, and the ground-floor facade along Fifth Avenue was refurbished. The work was initially slated to be performed by Brennan Beer Gorman, but Nobutaka Ashihara Associates took over the project. The renovated building was rededicated in July 1999.

A partnership between German investment firm TMW and the newly reconstituted Tishman Speyer Properties bought the building for $518 million in 2000 (about $890 million in 2024). TMW owned an 80 percent stake while Tishman owned the remaining 20 percent. The partners obtained a three-year $325 million floating-rate loan from German bank Westdeutsche Immobilien, allowing them to avoid paying $9 million in New York mortgage recording taxes. Tishman Speyer conducted another renovation of the newly refurbished ground floor. The Fifth Avenue entrance was closed and converted into a storefront, and a new lobby was installed at the relocated main entrance on 53rd Street. The Noguchi artwork was also renovated, having suffered from algae accumulation. The exterior signage was changed in 2002 to reflect the relocation of a major tenant, Citigroup. Later the same year, Tishman reportedly hired Lazard to market the building for $900 million.

By June 2003, Credit Suisse First Boston and German firm Commerzleasing und Immobilien were being considered as finalists to acquire 666 Fifth Avenue. The German company agreed to buy TMW's 80 percent ownership stake; this offer valued the building at $725 million. TMW then exercised its right of first refusal to match Commerzleasing und Immobilien's offer, increasing its ownership stake to 95 percent. In 2004, Tishman Speyer obtained a $562.5 million, five-year commercial mortgage-backed security (CMBS) senior loan from Lehman Brothers and UBS, which was split into three pari passu notes. The interest-only loan also included a $45 million junior loan in the form of mezzanine capital. At the time, an appraisal valued the property at $730 million since the building was 96.4 percent occupied and generating net cash flows of over $52 million a year.

=== Kushner ownership ===
==== Purchase and financing ====
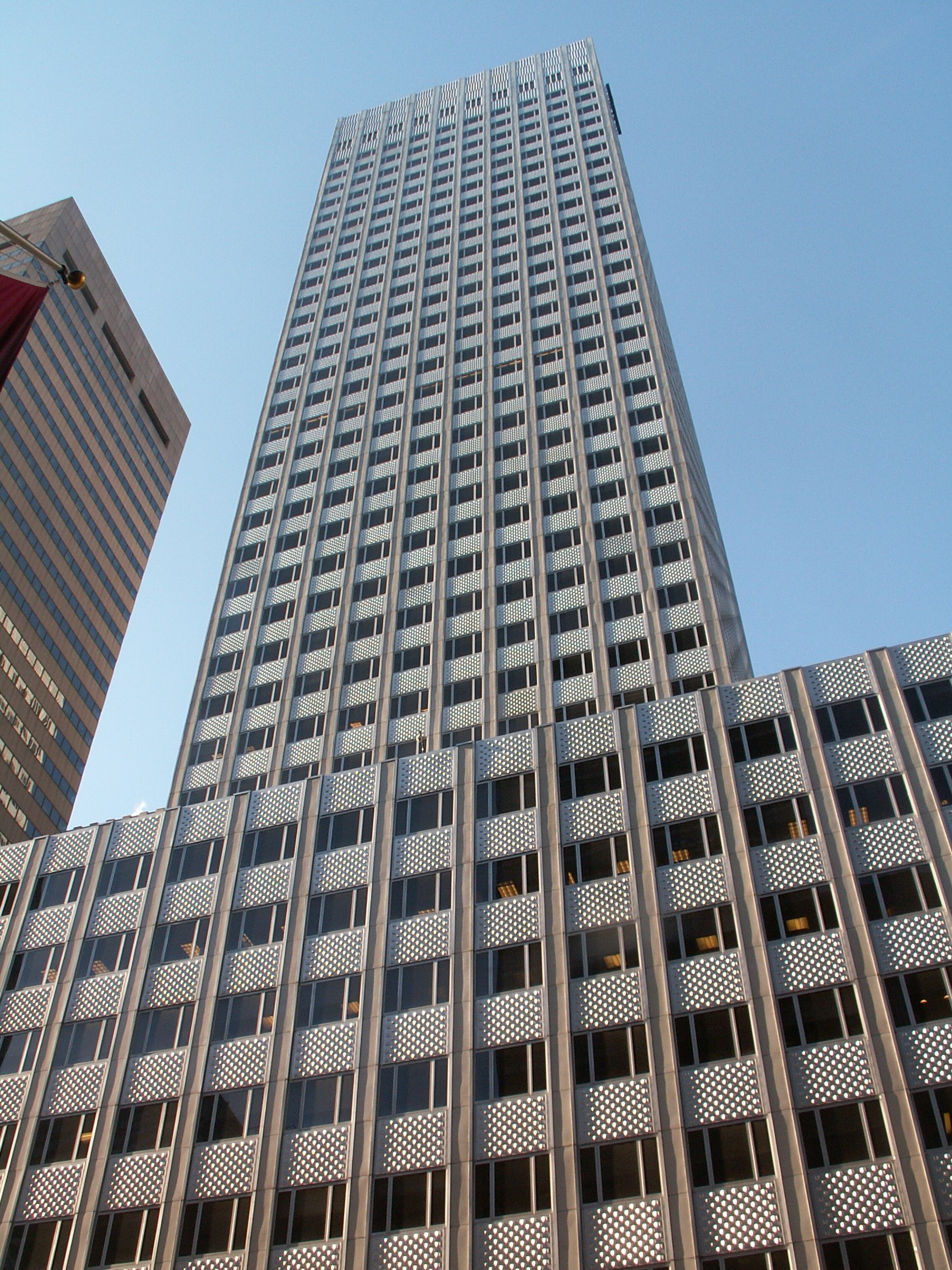
Front of 666 Fifth Avenue (2007).

In January 2007, Tishman Speyer, along with the German investment firm TMW, announced the sale of the building to Kushner Properties for $1.8 billion (about $2.7 billion in 2024), at the time the highest price ever paid for an individual office building in the U.S. The sale was the third large deal involving Tishman in two years (Note: It had purchased the MetLife Building in 2005 for $1.72 billion and it had purchased Stuyvesant Town–Peter Cooper Village in December 2006 for $5.4 billion.) and was atypical for several reasons. The Kushner Companies had traditionally focused on smaller multi-family residential properties in New Jersey and only owned one other Manhattan building, the Puck Building. After Charles Kushner was jailed in 2005, his son Jared took over the family company, moving the headquarters from Florham Park, New Jersey, to 666 Fifth Avenue. The building had no official offer price and was never officially marketed for sale, with Rob Speyer calling potential buyers personally. Additionally, 666 Fifth Avenue was not even among the top 150 tallest buildings in New York City, but Jared Kushner wanted to beat the recent $1.5 billion purchase of 1211 Avenue of the Americas.

The majority of the deal was assembled in less than a week, an unprecedentedly short time frame to conduct the necessary due diligence. Kushner put down $50 million in equity and borrowed the remaining $1.75 billion from a consortium of lenders, including a ten-year, $1.215 billion interest-only CMBS senior loan from Barclays and UBS, split into six pari passu notes. Kushner also received $535 million in mezzanine financing, split into a $335 million senior tranche and a $200 million junior tranche. Kushner obtained an appraisal valuing the property at nearly $3 billion, leading real estate magazine The Real Deal to report that the gap between the appraised valuation and the purchase price was unusually large. The banks also expected Kushner to increase the building's annual office rents from $53.5 million to $118.6 million to keep the building's loan-to-value ratio (LTV) in a manageable range. (Note: The $1.215 billion senior loan represented a 67.5 percent LTV, but the appraised value reduced the LTV to a more conservative 60.75 percent, making the CMBS seem safer to credit rating agencies. The debt service coverage ratio was 0.65, which meant the building's net cash flows could only pay for 65 percent of the senior loan's interest payments.)

==== Financing difficulties ====
By late 2007, Kushner sold a 49 percent stake in the retail condominium portion of 666 Fifth to a group led by Carlyle and Stanley Chera for $525 million (about $750 million in 2024). The buyers financed the purchase with a $300 million mortgage from Barclays and a $135 million mezzanine loan from SL Green Realty, a real estate investment trust. This allowed Kushner to repay the senior mezzanine loan. The next March, the CMBS loan backing the property was transferred to a special servicer after Kushner reported difficulties paying the mortgage. By 2010, an appraisal valued the building at just $820 million, less than half what Kushner Companies had paid three years earlier. That April, the Carlyle-led group put some retail space for sale with an asking price of between $600 and $700 million. Zara owner Inditex purchased 39,000 square feet (3,600 m^{2}) of retail space for $324 million, a record deal for a U.S. retail property. Carlyle used the profits from the sale to pay off the Barclays loan and the SL Green mezzanine loan. The firm also refinanced the remaining retail space with a $300 million loan from Morgan Stanley.

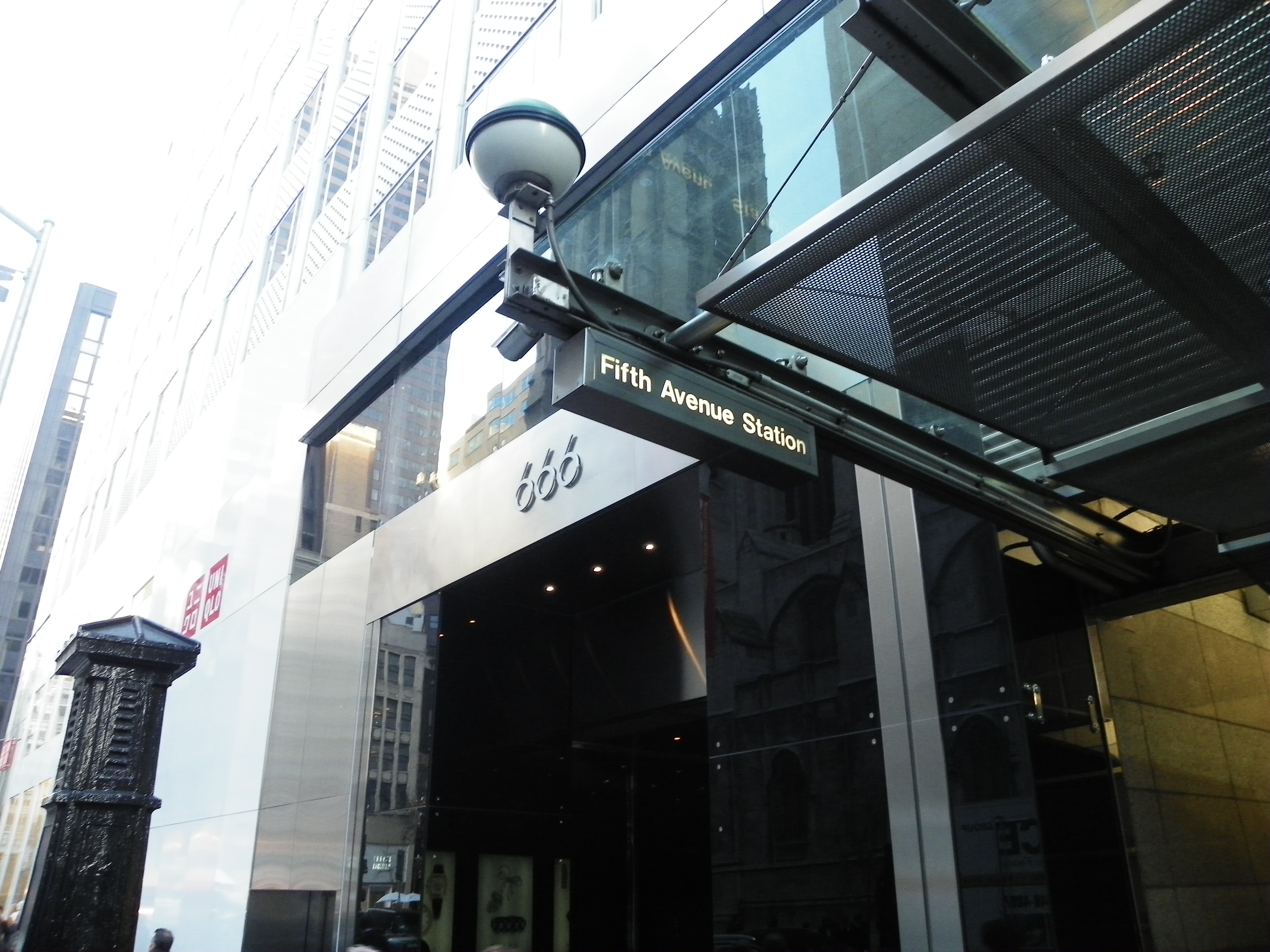
53rd Street entry to 666 Fifth Avenue, with the Fifth Avenue/53rd Street subway entrance at right

At the end of 2011, Kushner brought in Vornado Realty Trust which purchased a 49.5 percent equity stake for $80 million and assumed half the building's debt. Kushner also agreed to invest another $30 million for leasing the building's vacant space, which comprised 30 percent of the floor area, and rework it to suit tenant needs. The lenders of the $1.22 billion mortgage agreed to reduce the loan balance to $1.1 billion with the remainder placed into a "hope note" that would be repaid when the building's vacancy was reduced. The debt's maturity was pushed to 2019, and the interest rate was reduced. The bulk of the mortgage had been previously sold in the CMBS market and the remaining $285 million balance had been syndicated to firms specializing in subordinated debt, including AREA Property Partners, Starwood Capital Group, Colony Capital, and Paramount Group. Colony Capital founder Thomas J. Barrack Jr. claimed that Donald Trump, the father of Kushner's wife Ivanka, had contacted him to invest $45 million in the building's distressed debt after Kushner complained Barrack was pressuring him about the debt. AREA Property Partners also held $105.4 million of the building's debt and objected to the restructuring plan; in response, Kushner directed his newspaper The New York Observer to write a "hit piece" against AREA's CEO, which was never published.

In 2012, Starwood Capital Group purchased $30.82 million of air rights for the neighboring Baccarat Hotel and Residences at 20 West 53rd Street. That July, Vornado agreed to buy the rest of the retail space from Carlyle for $707 million. The Kushner Companies had also contacted the family of Israeli businessman Beny Steinmetz to ask them to invest in the property. From 2014 through 2016, Kushner Companies reportedly held talks with Hamad bin Jassim bin Jaber Al Thani, the Prime Minister of Qatar, as another potential investor. Barrack claimed to have arranged the meetings and said a tentative deal for a $500 million equity investment fell apart after Donald Trump won the 2016 United States presidential election. Saudi Arabian billionaire Fawaz Alhokair and the South Korean state-owned sovereign wealth fund Korea Investment Corporation were among the other potential investors. French billionaire Bernard Arnault reportedly declined an invitation to invest in the retail space. The property lost $14.5 million in 2016 as debt payments outweighed net operating income; by comparison, it had reported a roughly $10 million loss in 2015. The building was 70 percent leased, while the average Manhattan office building was 91 percent leased.

==== Anbang talks ====
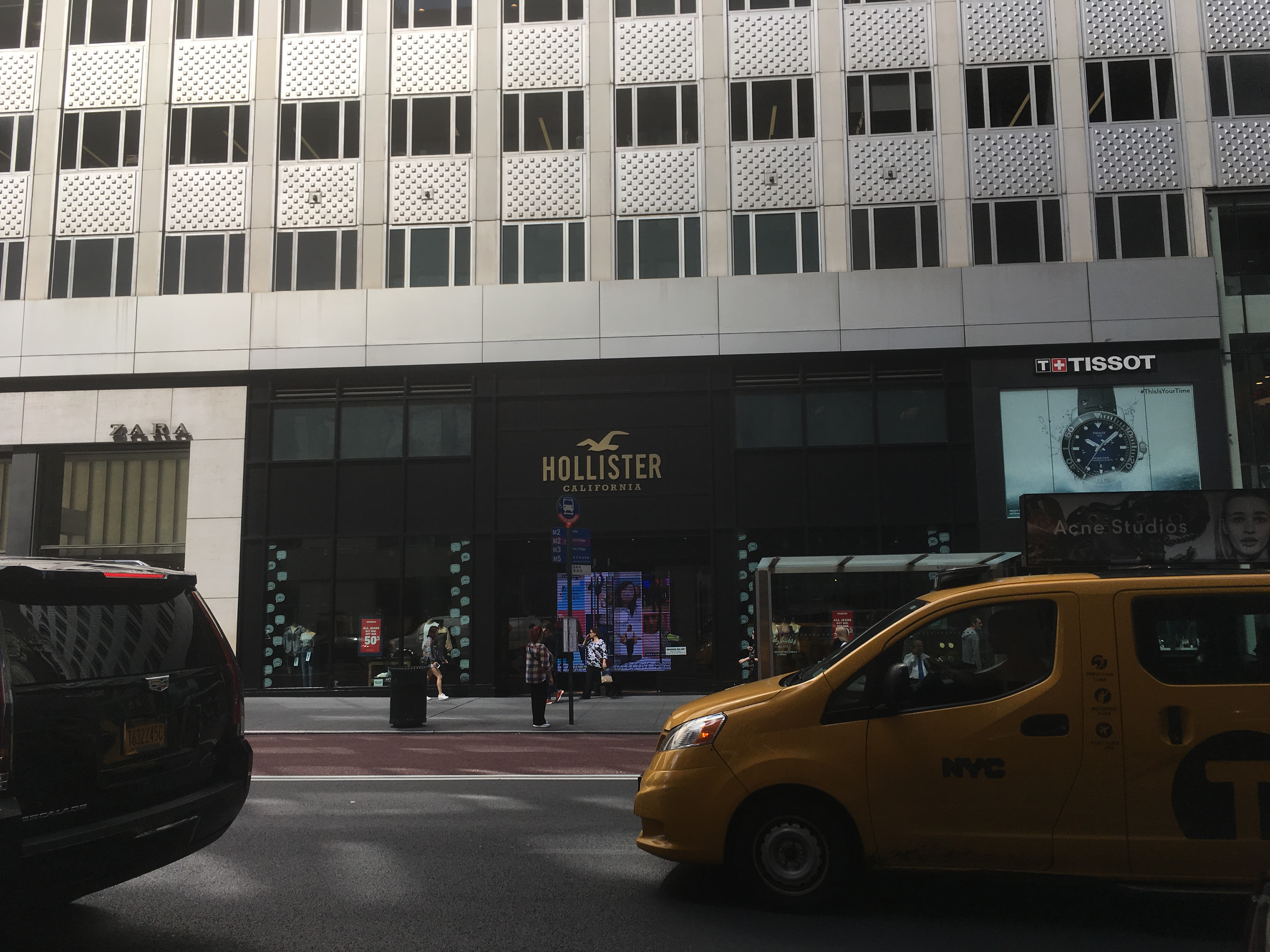
Hollister Co. store along Fifth Avenue

In July 2016, Kushner Companies began discussing with the Anbang Insurance Group of China about a potential investment. That November, Anbang's chairman and CEO Wu Xiaohui held a private dinner with Jared Kushner, Charles Kushner, and Laurent Morali at the Waldorf Astoria New York. The meeting came just one week after the 2016 U.S. presidential election, just as Jared Kushner was transitioning to a role in the first Trump administration. Benjamin Lawsky (Note: Lawsky was the former New York Superintendent of Financial Services who met Wu while investigating Anbang's 2015 purchase of Fidelity & Guaranty Life.) reportedly introduced Kushner and Wu. According to Chinese corruption expert Minxin Pei, Wu may have wanted political favors from the U.S. government.

In March 2017, Bloomberg News reported that Anbang was in talks to invest $400 million in the building, based on a valuation of $2.85 billion. (Note: $1.6 billion for the office section, and $1.25 billion for the retail section) Anbang and Kushner planned to receive a loan of over $4 billion, as well as $850 million in EB-5 visa program financing. The upper floors would be converted to luxury condominiums, while the Kushners would invest $750 million in the retail space, ending up with a 20 percent stake in the project. The expected final valuation of $7.2 billion would make it the most valuable single property in Manhattan and New York City. Some of the alleged terms of the deal were called "unusually favorable", including an exit for Vornado Realty Trust and retirement of the Kushner organization's remaining debt. These concerns led a group of Democratic politicians (Note: These included senators Elizabeth Warren, Tom Carper, Gary Peters, Sherrod Brown, as well as United States House Committee on Oversight and Reform chair Elijah Cummings.) to send a letter to Steven Mnuchin, the U.S. Treasury Secretary, demanding an investigation by the Committee on Foreign Investment in the United States. The politicians also highlighted Wu's connections to the Chinese Communist Party, as well as those of Chen Xiaolu, another prominent Anbang owner. No agreement was made as, shortly after the reports were published, Anbang denied it was looking to invest in the building.

==== Hadid tower ====
The failure of the Anbang agreement prompted Kushner to hire Zaha Hadid Architects to redevelop 666 Fifth Avenue. Hadid designed a $12 billion skyscraper on the site, which would have been the world's third most expensive building. The project would have reduced the skyscraper to its steel frame and added forty stories, bringing its total height to 1,400 feet (430 m). The facade would have been replaced with glass. The structure, to be completed by 2025, would have contained a "vertical mall" on its lowest nine floors, topped by an 11-story hotel and 464,000 square feet (43,100 m^{2}) of high-end condominiums. Several adjacent structures would have been demolished and replaced with a park. The building would have been rebranded 660 Fifth Avenue to avoid the negative connotations of the number 666. Dezeen wrote that Twitter users variously called the new design "a middle finger, a Swarovski phallus and a huge glass dildo".

To raise money for the tower, Charles Kushner met with Qatari Finance Minister Ali Sharif Al Emadi in April 2017. The website The Intercept first reported in March 2018 that Charles Kushner had sought funding for the new tower from Qatar's sovereign wealth fund, though Emadi declined to provide any financing. The meeting came roughly one month before the Qatar diplomatic crisis began; Jared Kushner reportedly sided with Saudi crown prince Mohammad bin Salman against Rex Tillerson, the U.S. Secretary of State. Kushner Companies denied the allegations that they met with Qatari government officials, and Charles Kushner claimed that the Qataris had arranged the meetings. The discussions also elicited concerns about Kushner's possible conflict of interest with President Trump.

The unsuccessful talks, the project's exorbitant costs, and the risks of the ultra-luxury condominium market prompted Vornado's Steven Roth to push for a more modest office renovation. Kushner's inability to bring on equity partners or lenders resulted in the cancellation of Hadid's skyscraper. The building's valuation decreased more than $25 million during 2017 after the senior mortgage's interest rate increased from 5.5 percent to 6.353 percent. Cash flow from the building's rents were only enough to cover about half of the required interest payments, down from roughly two-thirds the year before. At the end of 2017, several lawmakers (Note: These lawmakers included Democrats such as Ted Lieu of California, Jamie Raskin of Maryland, and Brendan Boyle of Pennsylvania.) sent a letter to Kushner Companies inquiring whether the company sought money from foreign governments to refinance the property. Due to the large amount of debt owed on the tower, Vornado Realty Trust announced it would sell its 49.5 percent stake in February 2018, and Kushner agreed to buy the stake for $120 million.

=== Brookfield Properties ownership ===
==== Purchase and renovation ====
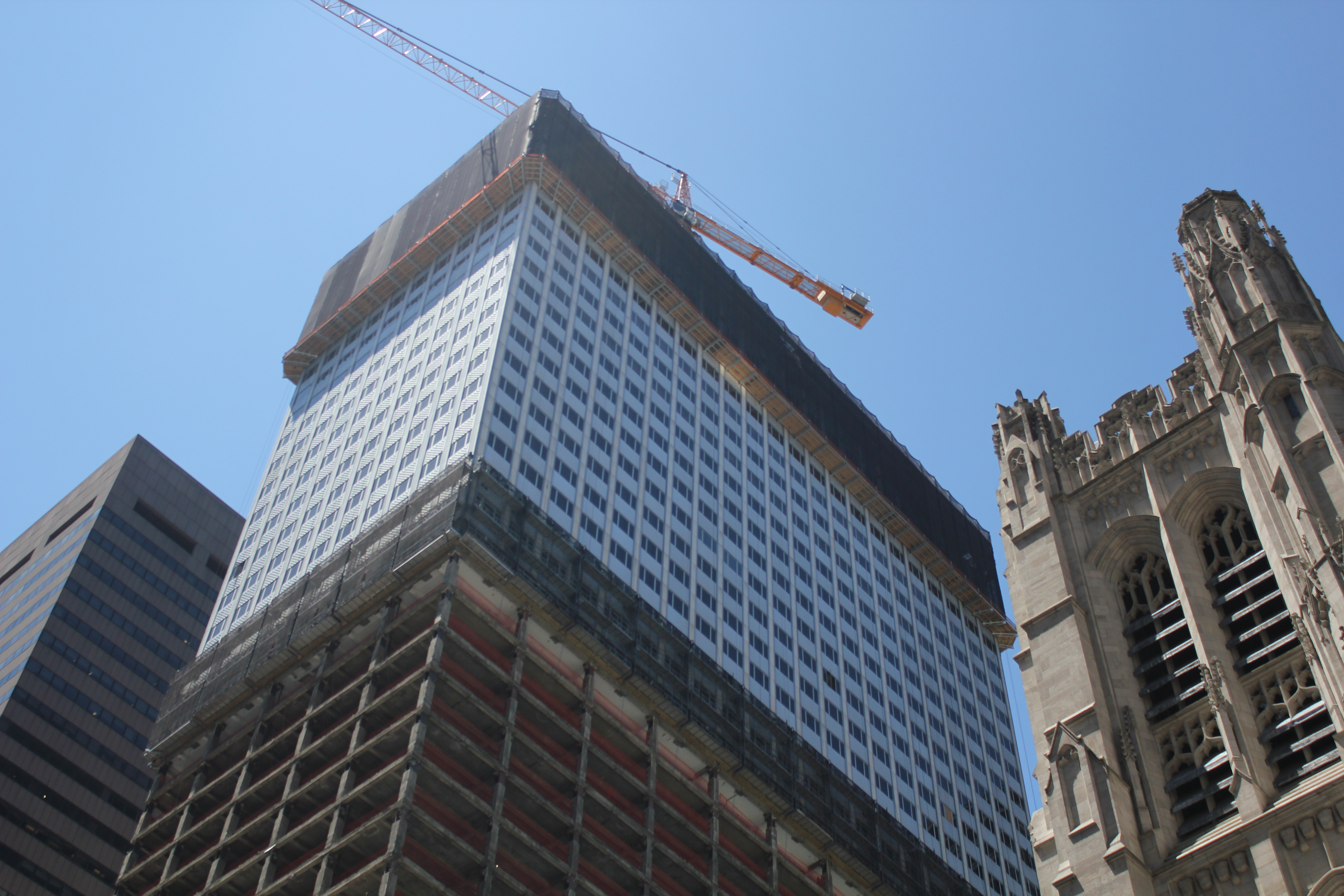
Removal of the upper-story facade underway in 2021

In August 2018, Brookfield Properties signed a 99-year lease for the property, with the Kushner family retaining the land. Brookfield paid $1.286 billion for the property, which allowed the senior mortgage to be paid off in full, although the $300 million "hope note" was written-off entirely. The company planned to invest more than $600 million to overhaul the building with a new lobby, facade, and mechanical systems. The purchase attracted controversy since the Qatar Investment Authority (QIA) owned a 9 percent stake in Brookfield Property Partners. A spokesperson for the QIA denied any interest in 666 Fifth Avenue, and Ric Clark of Brookfield said there was no "quid pro quo" with either the Trump family or the QIA. In February 2019, ING Bank loaned Brookfield Properties $750 million for renovations, and Apollo Global Management also reportedly provided a $300 million mezzanine loan. That April, Vornado sold a 48 percent stake in their retail portfolio, including the retail condominium at 666 Fifth Avenue, to the QIA and Crown Acquisitions.

In October 2019, Brookfield announced that a $400 million renovation would commence in late 2020 after the remaining tenants' leases expired. The building would be renamed 660 Fifth Avenue, with Kohn Pedersen Fox (KPF) as the architect. KPF planned to remove many of the building's interior columns, add double-high ceilings, add four exterior terraces, and replace the building's aluminum cladding with floor-to-ceiling windows. Upon completion of the renovations in 2023, Brookfield expected to achieve rents of over $100 per square foot ($1,100/m^{2}), some of the most expensive office rents in New York City. In May 2020, Kushner Companies announced plans to move to the nearby General Motors Building. The following month, Brookfield paid Kadima Realty Associates $8.5 million to terminate their lease early. By June 2020, Brookfield had spent $22.7 million year-to-date to buy out five tenants' leases.

Exterior recladding of 660 Fifth Avenue began in February 2021, and the building was renamed that month. One journalist referred to the change of address as "eliminating the Mark of the Real-Estate Beast", and observed that the old address and curtain wall had been among the "last nongeneric aspects of the building". The last panels of the old facade had been removed from the upper stories by that November. The lower stories and some of the upper stories had been re-clad by January 2022, and only the top seven stories remained to be clad by that April. The new curtain wall had been completed to the roof by July 2022, and the new facade was completed by January 2023.

==== New tenants ====
In May 2022, asset manager Macquarie Group became the first company to lease space in the renovated building, taking six stories; other tenants included 400 Capital Management, which took one story. Uniqlo bought its storefront at 660 Fifth Avenue in August 2024, paying between $340 million and $350 million. The last remaining vacant space was leased to Scotiabank in September 2025. The Wall Street Journal referred to the renovation as an "improbable comeback" for 660 Fifth Avenue, contrasting with the political controversies and precarious financial situation that the building had experienced during the 2010s.

== Tenants ==
=== Office tenants ===
Before the building opened, it was 80 percent leased to office tenants. Initial tenants included conglomerate Foster Wheeler, entertainment company Warner Bros., personal care companies Revlon and Helene Curtis Industries, advertisers Benton & Bowles and Ted Bates & Co, and exporter American Export-Isbrandtsen Lines. Numerous design firms were hired to customize the offices for tenants; for example, the Warner offices required a two-story theater for 100 people, while Foster Wheeler's engineering personnel were given interchangeable offices.

During the late 1960s, document management firm Xerox and lingerie firm Bali Company leased space in 666 Fifth Avenue. Financial services provider Mutual of America moved its headquarters into 62,000 square feet (5,800 m^{2}) at 666 Fifth Avenue in 1976. The computer-service company Donovan Data Systems, time-share firm Keydata Corporation, theater chain Loews Cineplex Entertainment, and brokers Shearson all leased space in the building in 1979. Oil firm AGIP Petroleum also had space at 666 Fifth Avenue in the 1990s.

Several law firms have occupied the building:

- Akerman LLP leased 48,000 square feet (4,500 m^{2}) on the 19th and 20th floors of the building. In 2019, Akerman announced plans to move out.
- Norton Rose Fulbright occupied the building until 2015.
- Orrick, Herrington & Sutcliffe signed a lease for 102,000 square feet (9,500 m^{2}) on the 17th through 20th floors in March 1995. Orrick, Herrington & Sutcliffe left in 2009.
- Schiff Hardin signed a lease for 48,000 square feet (4,500 m^{2}) on the 16th and 17th floors in November 2010.
- Vinson & Elkins renewed and expanded their lease for 81,000 square feet (7,500 m^{2}) in 2010.

Numerous financial firms have also occupied 660 Fifth Avenue:

- The hedge fund Citadel LLC leased 500,000 square feet (46,000 m^{2}) in the building in 2024.
- Citigroup occupied six floors totaling 198,000 square feet (18,400 m^{2}) in the building in 2002. In December 2007, Citigroup announced that, due to the Great Recession, it would not renew 75,000 square feet (7,000 m^{2}) on the building's third floor after the lease expired in August 2008.
- Colliers International leased 57,000 square feet (5,300 m^{2}) on the fourth floor in October 2013.
- Mutual of America occupied 175,000 square feet (16,300 m^{2}) in the building until 1991.
- Millennium Management, LLC, a hedge fund run by Israel Englander, occupied 170,000 square feet (16,000 m^{2}) in the building until the end of 2020.
- William Blair & Company, an investment bank, occupied 40,000 square feet (3,700 m^{2}) until 2018.

Some publishers have had offices at 660 Fifth Avenue, including:

- Bantam Books occupied 175,000 square feet (16,300 m^{2}) on the 24th and 25th floors starting in 1968. It then became part of Bertelsmann's American publishing subsidiary Doubleday, which moved out during 1992.
- The headquarters for DC Comics was located at 666 Fifth Avenue before it moved to 1700 Broadway by the 1990s.

=== Retail tenants ===
Initially, Marine Midland Bank operated a branch on the ground floor. Italian airline Alitalia had an office and reservation center on the ground floor, designed by Gio Ponti. Another tenant of the ground-floor retail spaces was bookstore B. Dalton, which opened a store there in 1978. By the late 20th century, Ted Lapidus also occupied one of the retail spaces.

In November 1997, the National Basketball Association announced plans to open their first-ever store in the southern retail space. The NBA Store was designed by the Phillips Group and took up 35,000 square feet (3,300 m^{2}) on the basement through second floors. The NBA Store, which opened in 1998, had a spiraling wooden ramp, a half-sized basketball court, and a basketball-hoop-shaped light fixture, all within a 36-by-54-foot (11 by 16 m) opening measuring 40 feet (12 m) high. Brooks Brothers opened a store in the northern retail space in 1998, signing a 15-year lease for 23,000 square feet (2,100 m^{2}) at a rent of $5 million per year after Nautica backed out of the space. The Brooks Brothers store had a glass exterior, as well as a 35-foot-tall (11 m) selling floor with limestone stairs to the second floor. Around 2000, Hickey Freeman moved into the building, with a new 4,000-square-foot (370 m^{2}) store designed by Robert A. M. Stern, installed within the former Fifth Avenue entrance. The Hickey Freeman store had Doric columns and a coffered ceiling with beams.

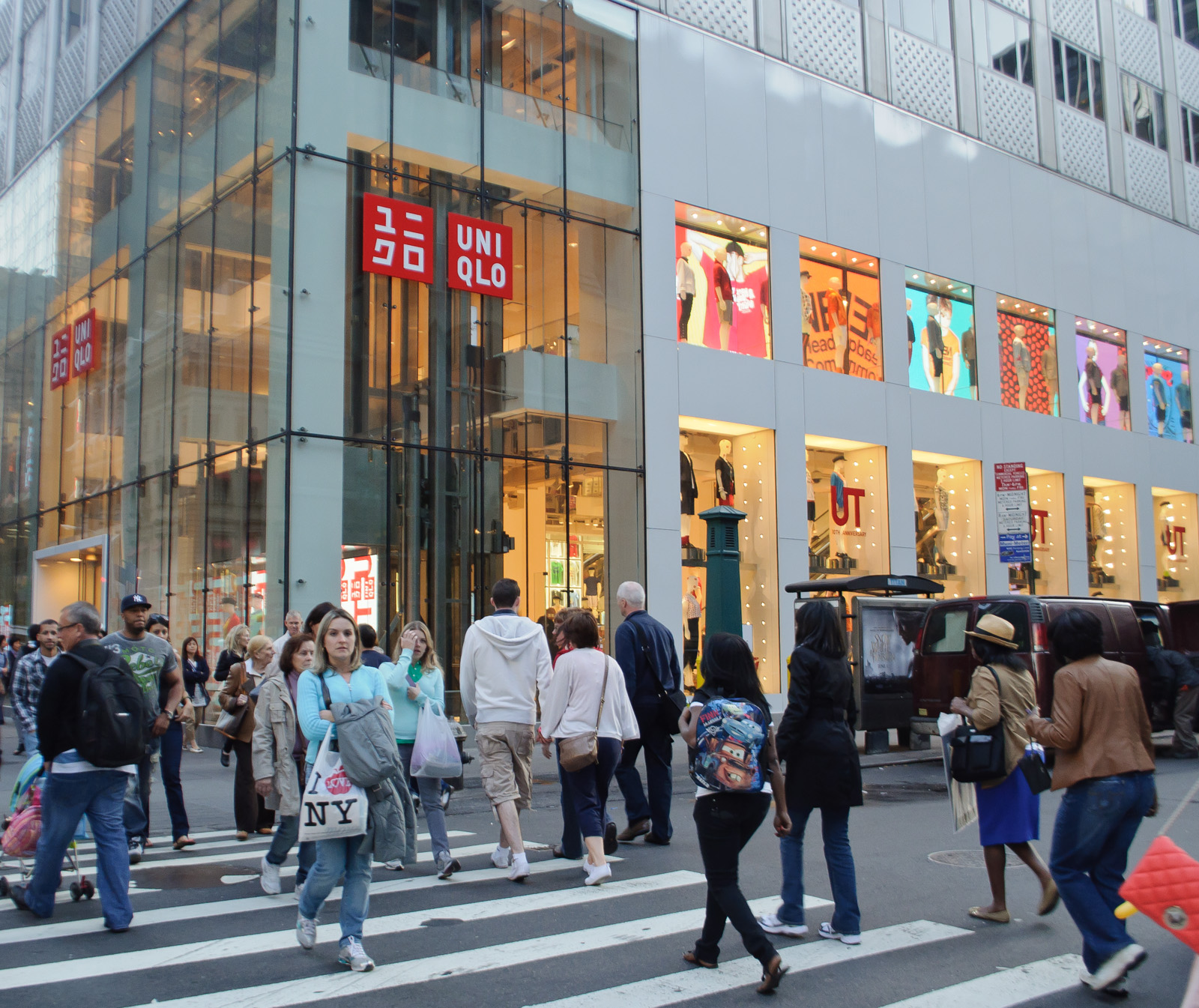
Uniqlo space

In 2008, the building's owners paid Brooks Brothers $47 million to end their lease six years early. The next year, owners also paid the bankrupt Hickey Freeman $11.96 million to vacate seven years early. NBA also moved out of the building in 2010 due to high rent. In 2011, Japanese retailer Uniqlo signed a 15-year, $300 million lease for 89,000 square feet (8,300 m^{2}) of space at the base of the building, beating out other potential lessees including Topshop, Nordstrom Rack, and AllSaints. The three-story store, Uniqlo's second in the United States and the largest non-department store retail space on Fifth Avenue, opened in October 2011. Uniqlo's space takes up the ground, second, and third floors.

The new Hollister Co. Epic New York flagship moved in during 2010. The storefronts of the Hollister flagship were fitted with a live video feed from Huntington Beach, California, displayed along with wave pools on 179 flat-screen TVs. Swatch signed a 15-year lease in February 2011, valued at $80 million, for the last 2,000 square feet (190 m^{2}) of retail space in the building.

== In media ==
The 1959 documentary film Skyscraper chronicled the construction of 666 Fifth Avenue. The film's director Shirley Clarke described it as a "musical comedy about the building of a skyscraper". Widely praised upon its release, Skyscraper was nominated for an Academy Award in 1960.

In her 1964 essay Notes on "Camp", cultural critic Susan Sontag wrote that the building illustrated the difference between kitsch and camp. She wrote: "Camp taste nourishes itself on the love that has gone into certain objects and personal styles. The absence of this love is the reason why such kitsch items as... the Tishman Building aren't Camp."

The Top of the Sixes was also featured in media. The 1990 novel Good Omens includes a scene where Famine (Dr. Raven Sable) is having drinks at the Top of the Sixes. The opening lunch scene for the movie The Wolf of Wall Street was filmed there as well.
