= Rob Speyer =

American real estate developer (born 1969)

- Born: 1969 (age 56–57)
- Education: Columbia College
- Occupation: Real estate developer
- Title: President and CEO, Tishman Speyer
- Spouse: Anne-Cecilie Engell (m. 2008)
- Parent(s): Jerry Speyer; Lynn Tishman

Rob Speyer (born 1969) is an American real estate developer. He is the CEO of New York City real estate company Tishman Speyer.

== Early life and education ==
Speyer was born to a Jewish family, the son of Lynn (née Tishman) and Jerry Speyer. His great-grandfather, Julius Tishman, founded Tishman Realty and Construction; and his father Jerry Speyer and his maternal grandfather, Robert Tishman, founded the real estate development firm Tishman Speyer. His parents divorced in 1987. In 1992, he graduated magna cum laude from Columbia College, where he was elected to Phi Beta Kappa. He is an emeritus member of the Board of Visitors at Columbia College.

== Career ==
He worked as a reporter for the New York Daily News before joining Tishman Speyer in 1995 where he worked on management and leasing before moving to the redevelopment unit in the late 1990s.

In 2015, Speyer became Tishman Speyer's president and chief executive officer after previously sharing the role with his father.

Speyer was a member of the Real Estate Board of New York's (REBNY) executive committee since 2004, and became the chairman of the committee in 2013, a role he held for five years before being succeeded by Bill Rubin. He was named chairman of the advisory board of the Mayor's Fund to Advance New York City in 2006, reappointed in 2014 by Mayor Bill de Blasio and then reappointed by Mayor Adams. He is Co-Chair of the Partnership for New York City, a position he has held since 2022.

Speyer sits on the board of trustees of New York-Presbyterian Hospital; the board of visitors of Columbia College (emeritus); the board of directors of the Real Estate Roundtable; the board of trustees of the Citizens Budget Commission; and on the board of directors of Exor.

== Personal life ==
In 2008, Speyer married Anne-Cecilie Engell, who is originally from Denmark.
