= Jerry Speyer =

American real estate developer (born 1940)

- Born: June 23, 1940 (age 86); Milwaukee, Wisconsin, U.S.
- Education: Columbia University (BA, MBA)
- Known for: Founding partner of Tishman Speyer
- Spouses: Lynn Tishman (m. 1964; div. 1987) Katherine G. Farley (m. 1991)
- Children: 3 with Tishman, including Rob; 1 with Farley

Jerry I. Speyer (born June 23, 1940) is an American real estate developer. He is one of two founding partners of the New York real estate company Tishman Speyer, which controls Rockefeller Center. Speyer was featured in the Forbes 400 list in 2021.

== Early life and education ==
Speyer was born in Milwaukee, Wisconsin, the son of Germaine M. and Ernst A. Speyer. According to a 1998 profile in The New York Times, "[Speyer's] mother is Swiss, and his father comes from one of the old Jewish families of Frankfurt" (however, there is only a very distant connection to the Speyer banking family, if any); his father, a shoe manufacturer, fled Germany in 1939, established a business in Milwaukee, before moving to New York when Jerry was three months old. Speyer grew up in a cultured German-Jewish household on Riverside Drive. He graduated from the private Horace Mann School. At Columbia University, he majored in German literature and joined Zeta Beta Tau, a Jewish fraternity. He was a friend of Art Garfunkel and Sanford Greenberg, his roommates, and Michael Mukasey. "Speyer was one of those people who were solid, and even solemn, at an age when others are still flailing and unsure of themselves." Speyer graduated from Columbia College in 1962 and received an MBA from Columbia Business School in 1964.

== Career ==
Speyer began his career in 1964 as Assistant to the Vice President of Madison Square Garden. Speyer was President & CEO of Tishman Speyer since he formed the company together with his father-in-law Robert Tishman in 1978. In 2015, Speyer's son Rob was named as the sole CEO of Tishman Speyer, however, Jerry stayed as an active chairman.

Speyer was chairman of the Federal Reserve Bank of New York, chairman of the Museum of Modern Art, and vice chair on the Board of Trustees of the Rand Corporation. Speyer is chair of the Executive Committee and chairman emeritus of Columbia University, chair emeritus of the Real Estate Board of New York, and past president of the Board of Trustees of the Dalton School.

Speyer is on the board of Carnegie Hall, alongside Sanford Weill, the former chairman of Citigroup, with whom he has a close business relationship (see External Links below). His other board affiliations include Siemens AG and the Real Estate Roundtable, and have included Yankee Global Enterprises and the Urban Land Institute. He is a member of the Economic Club of New York and the Council on Foreign Relations.

Speyer is chair emeritus of the Partnership for New York City, founded by David Rockefeller.

Speyer has sat on the board of trustees of NewYork–Presbyterian Hospital since 2000, and has been president since 2019.

== Personal life ==
In 1964, Speyer married Lynn Tishman, whose great-grandfather Julius Tishman founded Tishman Realty and Construction, of which Tishman Speyer is a spinoff. In 1987, they divorced. They had three children:

- Valerie Hope Speyer Peltier (born 1967) works at Tishman Speyer as part of the Acquisitions and Development group. In 1993, she married Jeffrey Richard Peltier of Tipp City, Ohio. The wedding was officiated by Rabbi Peter Rubinstein at the Rainbow Room in New York.
- Rob Speyer (born 1969) previously worked as a reporter at The New York Daily News but is now a chief executive and president of Tishman Speyer. In 2008, he married Anne-Cecilie Engell (who is Danish) in a nondenominational ceremony in Copenhagen.
- Holly Ann Speyer Lipton (born 1973) works as a television producer. In 1999, she married Jonathan Lipton. The wedding was officiated by Rabbi Peter Rubinstein at the Pierre in New York.

In 1991, Speyer married Katherine G. Farley, whom he had hired in 1984 to oversee international development. Farley graduated from Brown University in 1971, and with a Masters of Architecture from the Harvard Graduate School of Design in 1976. She was manager of new business development for East Asia and the Pacific for Turner International Industries before joining Tishman Speyer in 1984. She is a senior managing director at Tishman Speyer, responsible for the company's real estate activities in Latin America and for the company's expansion into other emerging markets, chairs the company's Compensation Committee, and is a member of the Management, Investment, and Executive Committees. They have one daughter

- Laura Speyer (born 1992).

Farley is chair of Lincoln Center's redevelopment and is on the executive committee of the International Rescue Committee, a refugee relief and resettlement organization, and is chair emeritus of Women in Need, which helps homeless women and children in New York City. She is a vice president of the Brearley School, and a member of the Board and Executive Committee of the Alvin Ailey Dance Foundation. Farley has been on the boards of Lincoln Center Theater and the New York Philharmonic. In 2013, Crains New York Business listed her as number twelve among the “50 Most Powerful Women in New York”

Lynn Tishman later married Harold R. Handler, who is retired as a senior partner in the New York law firm of Simpson Thacher & Bartlett.

== Recognition ==
- Golden Plate Award of the American Academy of Achievement, 1997
- American Academy of Arts & Sciences, 2014
- Crain's New York Hall of Fame, 2020
