= Washington Square Village =

Residential skyscrapers in Manhattan, New York

Coordinates: 40°43′41″N 73°59′50″W

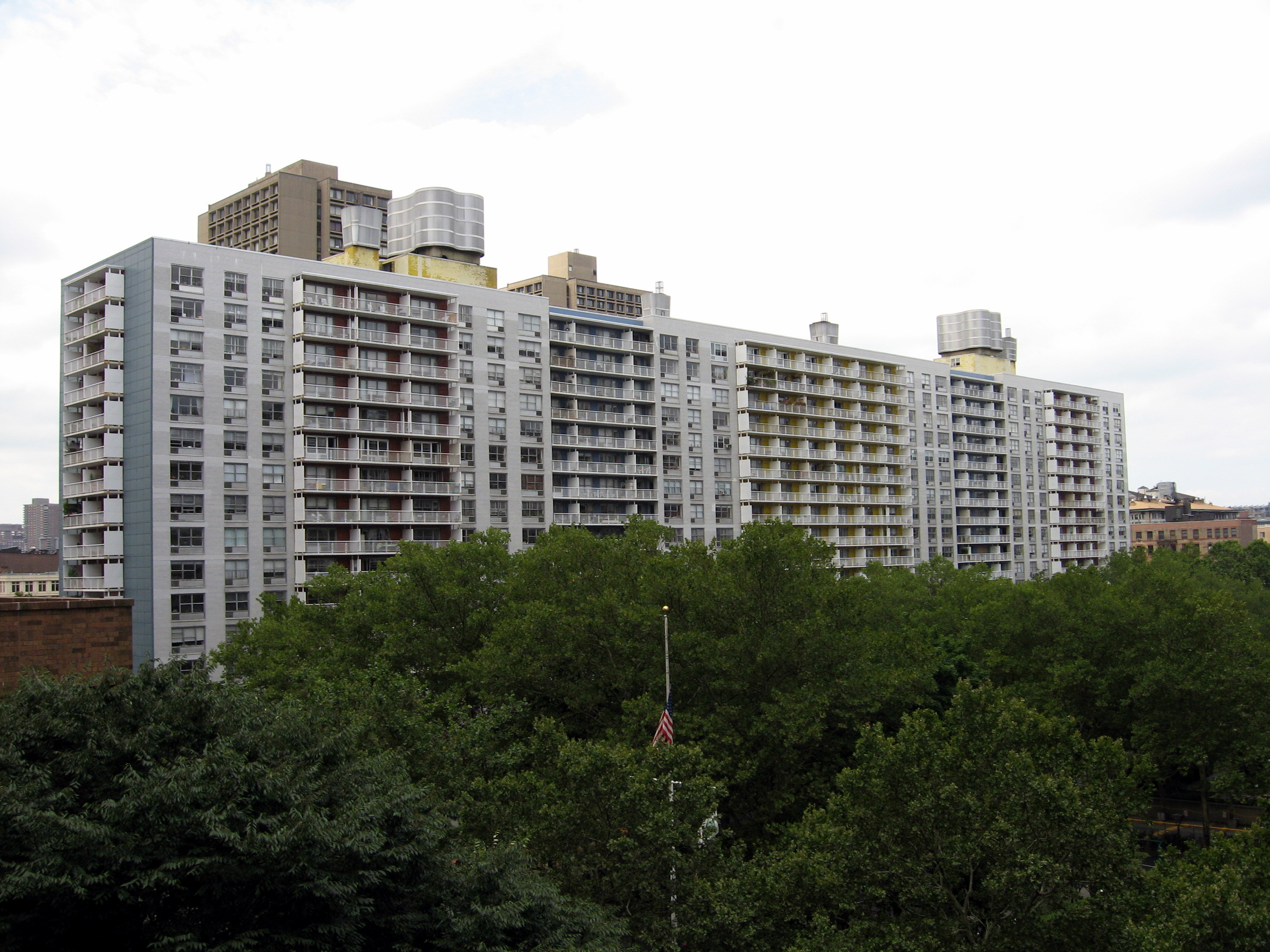
A view of Washington Square Village from Mercer Street

Washington Square Village (WSV) is an apartment complex in a superblock in the Greenwich Village neighborhood of Manhattan, New York City. WSV was developed by Paul Tishman and Morton S. Wolf. To design the housing complex, the developer selected architects S. J. Kessler and Sons, with Paul Lester Weiner as consultant for site planning and design; landscape architects were Sasaki, Walker & Associates.

WSV contains 1,292 apartments in two parallel tower slabs of two buildings each, enclosing a park over a 650-car underground garage. WSV represents the epitome of the tower in a park approach to housing. The complex features vertical panels of bold, primary-color glazed bricks, and terraces. It is owned by New York University and houses faculty members, graduate students, and other members of the community. WSV is bounded by West 3rd Street, Bleecker Street, Mercer Street, and LaGuardia Place to the north, south, east and west respectively. It is traversed by two driveways of which the westerly one was formerly part of Wooster Street, and the easterly, Greene Street.

== Early history ==
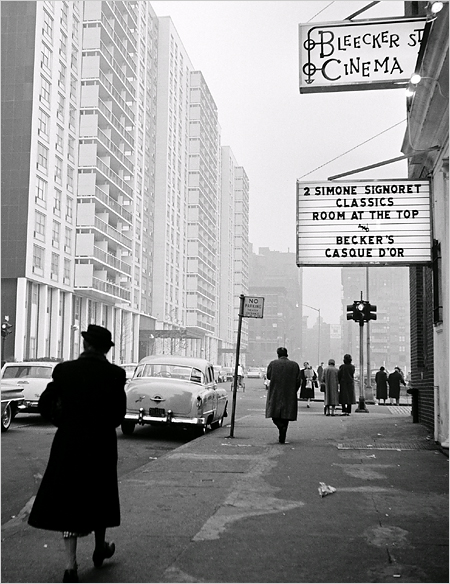
The Bleecker Street Cinema, a movie theater that closed in 1990. The Washington Square Village apartment complex is visible in the background.

In the early 19th century, the tract on which Washington Square Village now stands was in the Eighth ward in the northernmost part of the New York City. Beyond were only farms and estates stretching north from what is now Washington Square Park. Neither the Park nor the street grid of numbered streets and avenues yet existed. The Bleecker family owned an estate in the area and a Reverend Bleecker was Rector at the St. Luke's in the Fields, Trinity Parish, on Hudson Street. This church is still standing and in active use. Before the east side took shape, the west side of town had already become urbanized as the Village of Greenwich.

There were three average sized city blocks where WSV now stands. Examples of what they looked like then can be found immediately to the east and west of the block. The blocks were settled by the French and called "Frenchtown" for a time. By the 1870s most of the French had moved uptown, and it became the "Latin Quarter", well known for its brothels and taverns. No churches or public buildings were built on these blocks. West Third Street was then called Amity Street and LaGuardia Place was Laurens Street. Laurens, Wooster, Greene, and Mercer are Revolutionary War heroes (as are Sullivan, Thompson, and McDougall).

John Lloyd Stephens, an amateur archaeologist who rediscovered Mayan ruins in 1839, lived in 13 LeRoy Place, a house built on the area occupied now by the Building 4 of the WSV complex. In 1892, Nikola Tesla moved his laboratory to the 4th floor of a factory building at 33-35 South Fifth Avenue (now LaGuardia Place), on the western boundary of Washington Square Village. In March 1895, a fire destroyed the laboratory and caused the loss of ten years of Tesla's research.

== Urban renewal ==
For the first half of the 20th century the WSV area remained a neighborhood of mostly working class flats, lofts and factories. Although never a slum, it was nevertheless slated for urban renewal by the Mayor's Committee on Slum Clearance, as part of a vast project led by Robert Moses. Washington Square Village was intended to be part of a broad effort in Manhattan and throughout New York City to clear what some in the city government perceived as slums and to replace the old, run-down buildings with sleek modern structures.

The project was to include a vehicular bridge from Red Hook, Brooklyn to Battery Park, and an elevated highway, the Lower Manhattan Expressway, across Lower Manhattan. The plan also included a new "Fifth Avenue South" replacing West Broadway and what is now LaGuardia Place. As was the case in the 19th century with the street grid, local opposition stopped it. The only parts of the project that did happen are the superblocks where Washington Square Village and University Plaza now stand, including the adjacent widened parts of West Third and Bleecker Streets and the parkland strips along Mercer Street and LaGuardia Place between Houston and West Third.

== NYU acquisition, apartment complex development ==
Washington Square Village was proposed in July 1957 as part of a six-building, 2,004 unit complex that would stretch down to Houston Street; 54,000 square feet (5,000 m^{2}) of shopping space was to be included. In the 1950s, after the assembly of the superblock, Washington Square Village was constructed as a for-profit, middle class housing complex. It was marketed to people who might otherwise move out of the city or who had already moved out to the suburbs and might want to move back. Initially, the apartment complex was referred to as Tishman’s Tenements, after Paul Tishman one of the original developers. Rents for studios to three bedrooms ranged from about $150 to about $300 per month with about $25 extra for underground parking. Occupancy commenced in the Fall of 1958 with the opening of the north Buildings 1 and 2. South buildings 3 and 4 were opened a year or two later with freight elevators and no penthouses. A third building was to be built in the block where the University Plaza and the Silver Towers now stand. This was never accomplished presumably for lack of demand or due to the increased cost and taxes.

The languishing rental market led to the acquisition of Washington Square Village by New York University for $25 million. (The reported cost of development, according to the Housing and Redevelopment Board statistics was $20 million.) NYU bought Washington Square Village in 1964, after Paul Tishman (one of the original developers of WSV who was also sitting on the NYU board) ran into financial trouble. NYU also purchased the as yet unimproved superblock to the south and built University Plaza on it, including Silver Towers, Coles Sports and Recreation Center, 505 LaGuardia Place, and a commercial building which as of 2014 was occupied by Morton Williams Supermarkets.

In the 1960s, William Lescaze accused the developers and the architects of WSV of using plans, ideas, and designs that he developed to build the WSV complex. In 1962, Lescaze filed suit, claiming $550,000 in damages for the unfair use of the materials that he developed for WSV, and for which he was never officially hired and paid.

Illustration of the original WSV plan. Notice the third building in the block between Bleecker and Houston Streets, which was never built.

An aerial view of Washington Square Village (Notice this image looks southwest; the illustration on the left, of the planned three building construction, looks northeast.)

After the purchase by NYU, residents of the complex were entitled to remain in their apartments but vacant units (of which there were many) and units as they became vacated after NYU's purchase could be acquired for University use. As the neighborhood has become increasingly desirable, many of the original residents have continued to stay on and have been there for upwards of 35 or 40 years. It is also being used as graduate student and faculty housing.

The garden between the two buildings has been designed by Hideo Sasaki and combined biomorphic shapes with a strong grid of trees and a spectacular fountain with four high jets to stand up to the high-rises. It was a pioneering example of rooftop planting, being built on top of an underground garage. According to a 1999 New York Times Home & Garden article, the subtleties of the design have been blurred by poor maintenance and a misguided choice of trees and shrubs. The fountain was renovated in 2013 but most of the plants are different from the ones that were carefully selected by Sasaki for the original garden.

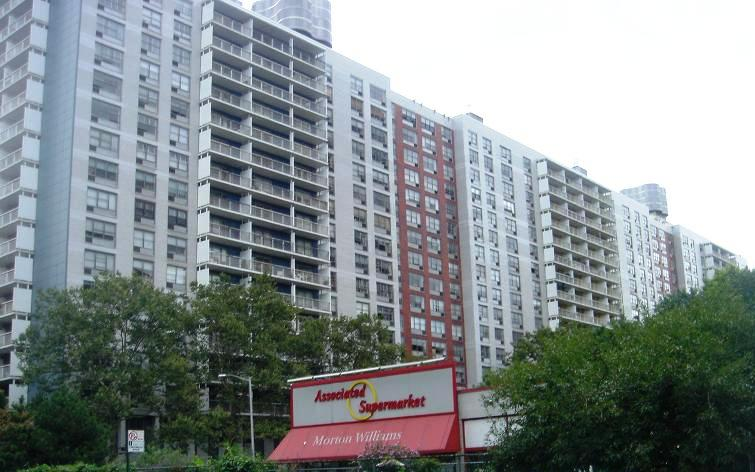
The buildings as seen from Bleecker Street and LaGuardia Place.

Next to a pillar outside Building 2, a plaque is set in the asphalt that reads "BOB HOVELL STOOD HERE", memorializing Bob Hovell, a long-term resident and superintendent of Washington Square Village.

== NYU 2031 and future ==
As part of the NYU 2031 long-term strategic planning initiative, NYU has presented some concept plans for the redevelopment of the complex. The plans include ideas to demolish the buildings and restore the superblock to its original 6-block constituents; other ideas include the development of additional buildings in the garden between the two WSV buildings.

== In popular culture ==
Located in a highly desirable neighborhood, Washington Square Village is one of the building complexes featured in the popular TV show Friends as establishing shots for Ross Geller's apartment during the first five seasons.
