= Chatham Center =

Building complex in Pennsylvania, US

- Pittsburgh, PA
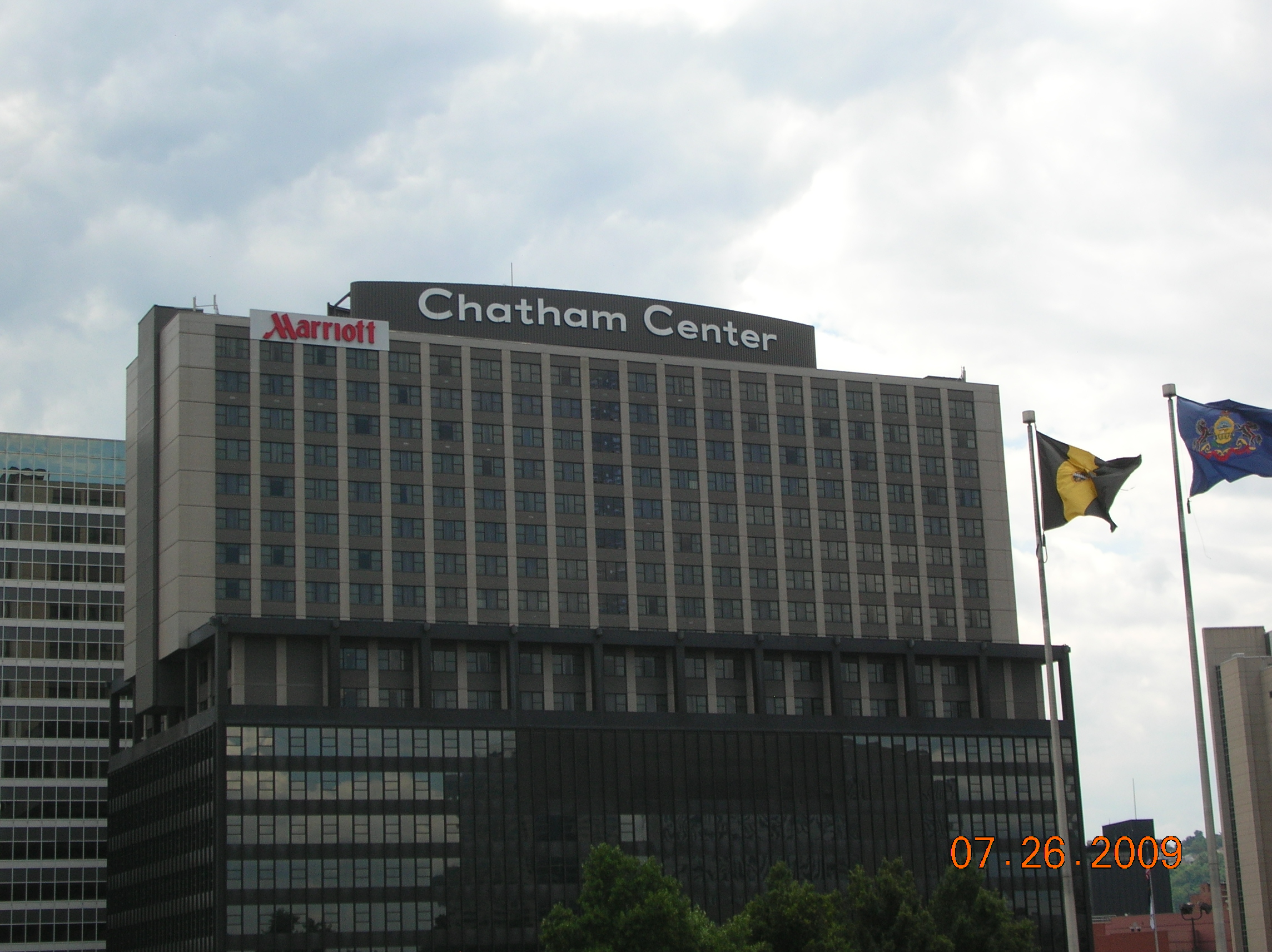
- Chatham One Building at Chatham Center

- Location within Pittsburgh

General information
- Type: commercial and residential
- Architectural style: modern
- Location: Downtown Pittsburgh, 112 Washington Place, Pittsburgh, PA, USA
- Coordinates: 40°26′21.67″N 79°59′32″W
- Construction started: 1964-10-20
- Completed: 1966-09-07
- Cost: $26 million USD

Dimensions
- Other dimensions: 5.5 acre complex

Design and construction
- Architect: William Lescaze
- Main contractor: Diesel Construction Company

Chatham Center is a 5.5 acre commercial and residential building complex located within Downtown Pittsburgh. It is bounded by the Interstate 579 (Crosstown Boulevard) on the west, Centre Avenue on the north, Washington Place on the east, and Fifth Avenue to the south. Comprising a 2,200 car parking garage, Marriott Hotel, residential condominium building, and office and retail space, Chatham Center is a located adjacent to PPG Paints Arena and Duquesne University nearby.

== History ==
Chatham Center was named after the Earl of Chatham, William Pitt, for whom Pittsburgh is named. Groundbreaking for the project occurred with much fireworks and fanfare the evening of October 20, 1964. The complex was built between 1964 and 1966 by Chatham Center Inc, of which the principal investors were Morton S. Wolf and Leon Falk Jr. Financing for construction was provided by the Irving Trust Company of New York and the Mellon National Bank of Pittsburgh with the mortgage for the center being held by the Prudential Insurance Company. The architects for the project were William Lescaze and Harry H. Lefkowitz while the construction was by the Diesel Construction Company of Pittsburgh.

Prior to construction, four downtown Pittsburgh hotels waged an unsuccessful two-year court battle that was appealed all the way to the Pennsylvania Supreme Court opposing the construction on the grounds that there were already too many hotel rooms in downtown Pittsburgh and further hotel construction would hinder current hotel business in the city.

=== Original plans ===
The original plans for the center called for a 20 floor luxury apartment building; nine-story office building with a Howard Johnson's Motor Lodge hotel above; a 650-seat movie theater; a 2,200 car garage and gas station at a cost of $26 million.

The building plans were delayed by labor strikes and absent building materials, but was finally completed by 1966. The day-long dedication and open house occurred on September 7, 1966, with a ceremonial "light-switch" thrown by Richard K. Mellon.

=== Multiple owners ===
Chatham Center Inc continued to operate the center until 1975 when Prudential was able to foreclose on the mortgage and bought the entire Chatham Center facility at sheriff's sale for $19 million. Chatham Center Inc, headed by Leon Falk Jr, had defaulted on mortgage payments and was $2.1 million behind in property taxes.

Prudential made many changes while owner of Chatham Center. In 1976, the hotel changed from a Howard Johnson's to the Pittsburgh Hyatt House. The Chatham apartment building was converted to a condominium in 1981 and Chatham Two was built as the final phase to completing the entire Chatham Center concept envisioned in the 1960s.

In 1988, Prudential sold its interest in Chatham Center for $36.2 million to Elteq Equities Inc and included Chatham One and Two buildings in addition to the parking garage. Elteq Management Company assumed management of the center and renovated the parking garage shortly after the sale.

In 2014, One Chatham Center went into foreclosure after UPMC's departure left the space nearly vacant.

In 2015, HSBC Bank USA bought One Chatham Center at a sheriff's sale for $2,321.

In 2017, Core Realty bought One Chatham Center for $8 million, and turned floors 4-8 into apartments.

== Buildings and Plaza ==
Chatham Center consists of three high rise buildings and a plaza built on top of a 2,200 car parking garage. The center originally contained a 650-seat movie theater in the south east corner.

=== Chatham Tower Condominium ===
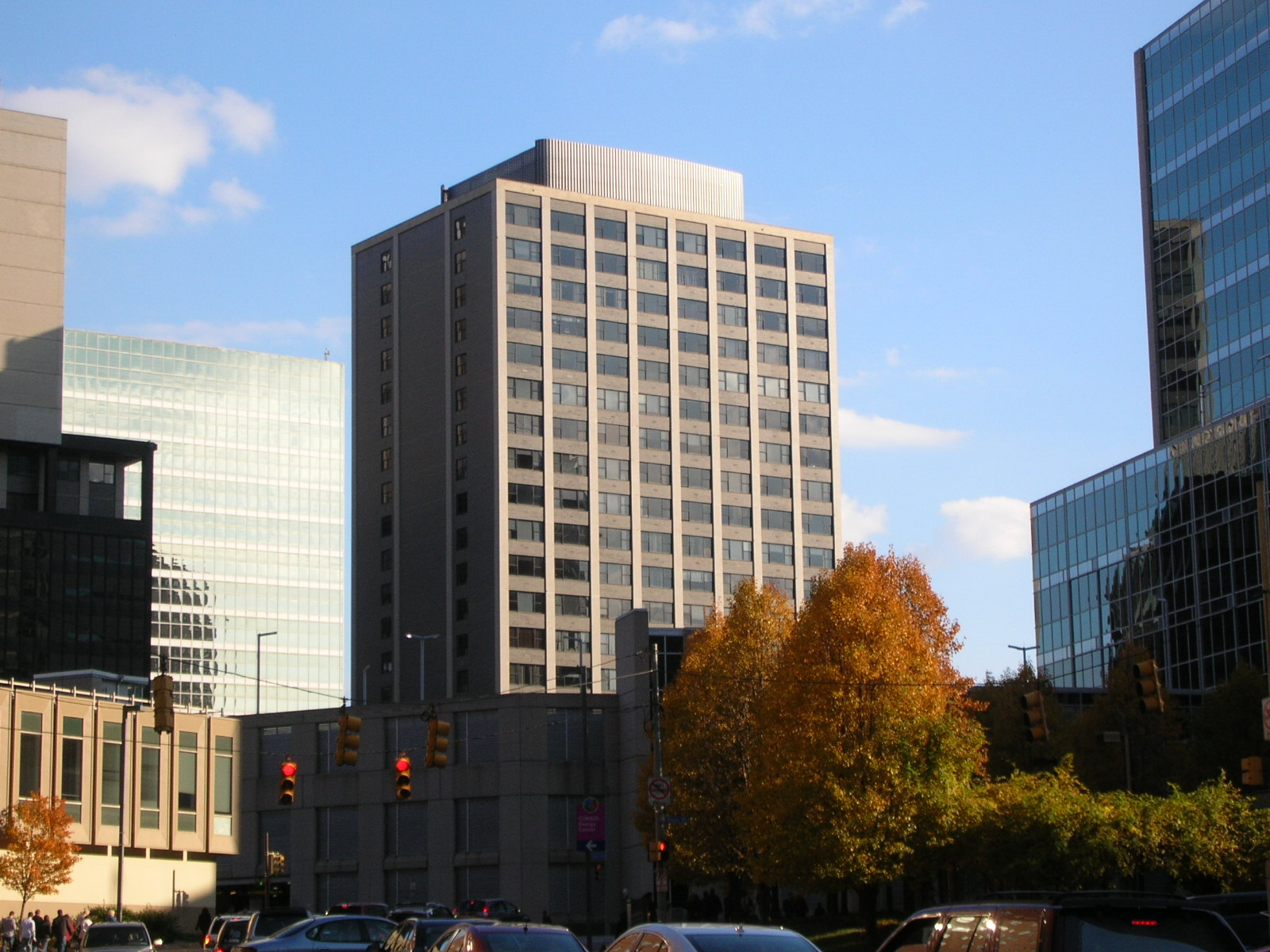
Chatham Tower Condominium

The Chatham Tower Condominium building was built as a luxury apartment building and was part of the original plans for Chatham Center. The apartment tower comprised 180 apartments and opened for tenants on May 1, 1966. J.J. Gumberg Company was named rental agent in 1967. This luxury residential building became a premier Pittsburgh address and home to many distinguished Pittsburgh residents over the decades.

In 1981, the Prudential Insurance Company, then owner of Chatham Center, converted the apartment building into a luxury condominium. The new condominium project was named, "The Tower, A Condominium at Chatham Center" (often referred to as Chatham Tower Condominium), and opened with a gala celebration on December 6, 1981. Since opening, the condominium building has continued to be a premier residential address in Pittsburgh. In 2010, the building completed an extensive interior renovation project.

=== Chatham One ===
The Chatham One high rise building was part of the original plan for Chatham Center and is a mixed use building. The first nine stories contain 230,000 square feet (21,000 m^{2}) of office space and are separate from the top 11 floors which contain a hotel.

Early tenants of the office space included Travelers Insurance, Westinghouse Electric, and the National Steel Corporation. Today, major tenants include Allegheny County Economic Development and the Pittsburgh Penguins offices.

When originally opened in 1966, the hotel on the upper half of the building was a 450-room Howard Johnson's Motor Lodge. The Motor Lodge included a pool on the eleventh floor, a bar, restaurant, and signature Red Coach Grille. The Chatham Center Howard Johnson was designed to be an upscale hotel version of the traditional roadside Howard Johnson. Hyatt Corp took over the hotel site in 1976 and renamed the hotel, the Pittsburgh Hyatt House at Chatham Center. Extensive renovations took place and the number of hotel rooms were reduced to 406. When the Hyatt House branding was phased out, the hotel was later renamed the Hyatt Pittsburgh.

In 1996, Host Marriott entered into a joint venture with Interstate Hotel Corporation and bought the Hyatt Pittsburgh for $18.5 million. Marriott assumed operation and the hotel was renamed the Pittsburgh Marriott City Center Hotel. It underwent an $8 million renovation, during which the number of rooms was reduced to 396 and six suites.

In 2014, UPMC agreed to sublease the Heinz 57 Center and move 550 employees from One Chatham Center after Heinz had vacated the space after a round of layoffs in 2013.

In 2015, HSBC Bank USA bought One Chatham Center at a sheriff's sale for $2,321.

In 2017, Core Realty bought One Chatham Center for $8 million and converted the vacant lower office levels to The Washington at Chatham apartments.

=== Chatham Two ===
Chatham Two is a 16-story, 340,000 square feet (32,000 m^{2}) high rise office building built between 1980 and 1981. It was planned by then owner, Prudential Insurance Company, and was considered the first of many high rises built during Pittsburgh's Renaissance II building boom of the 1980s. The entire building is dedicated to office space and was 75% pre-leased prior to completion. The Chatham Two building is in the modernist style of architecture and is completely covered in mirrored glass and aluminum framing. It was designed by the architectural firm of Burt Hill Kosar Rittelmann Associates and construction was by Mellon-Stuart Co.

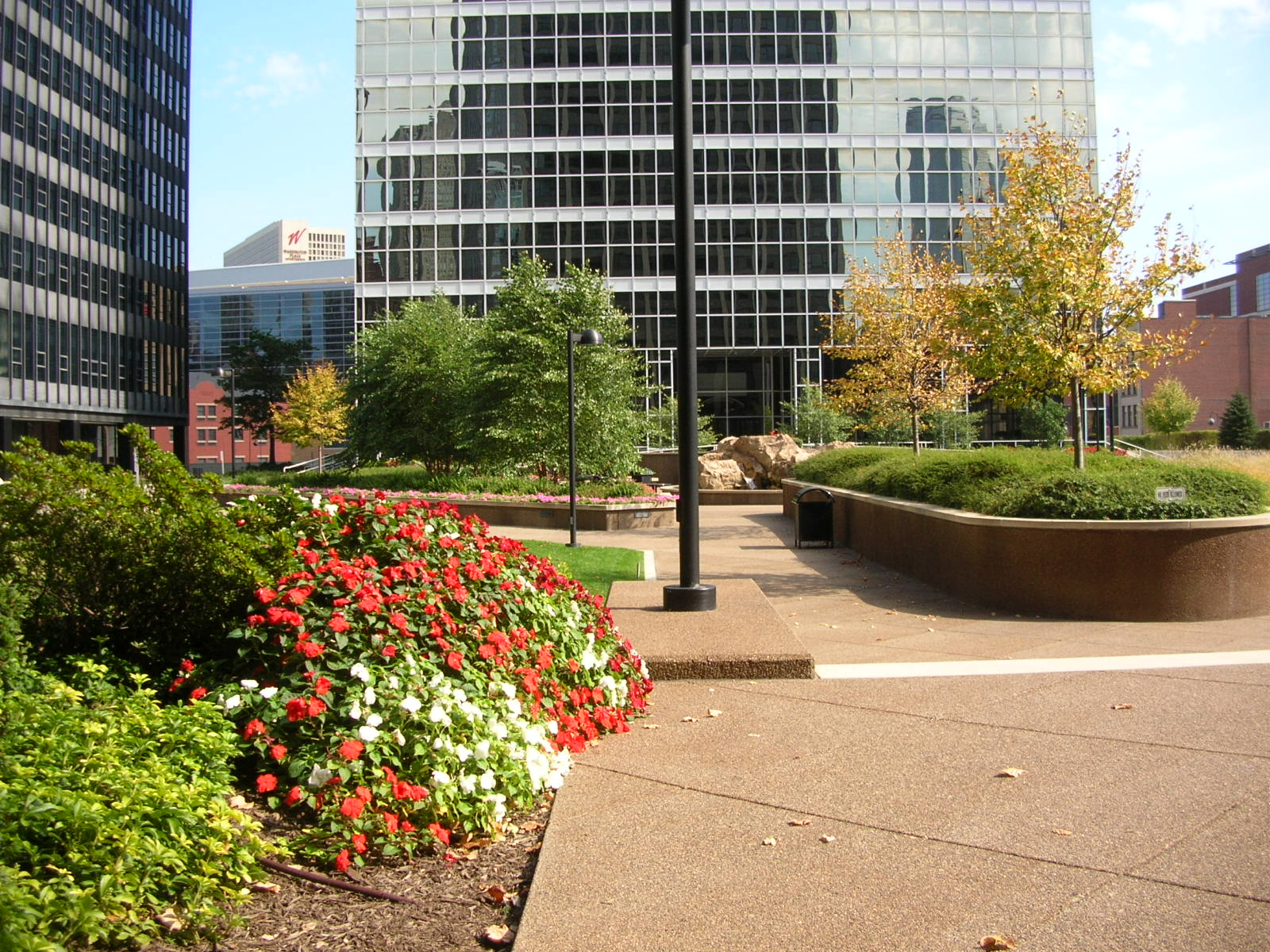
Two Chatham Center building and Plaza

=== Plaza ===
The 4.5 acre landscaped plaza at Chatham Center received its first complete renovation after 40 years in 2007 and was designed by Fahringer, McCarty, Grey Inc of Monroeville, Pennsylvania. A new central fountain was created surrounded by trees and walkways with floral landscaping and ornamental grasses. The plaza is used daily by residents and guests to Chatham Center.

Chatham Cinema

=== Chatham Cinema ===
The Chatham Cinema was part of the original plan for Chatham Center and opened on October 25, 1966, with a pre-screening of the movie, "Alfie". The cinema's palatial decor was in the American Revolutionary style with period antiques throughout the lobby and movie seats with reclining backs. The cinema closed in 1985. The facade has since been bricked up. It was located in the south east corner of Chatham Center on the corner of Washington Place and Fifth Avenue. There was also an entrance to the cinema from the parking garage.
