= Paul Tishman =

American real estate developer and art collector (1900–1996)

- Born: 1900
- Died: 1996 (aged 95–96)
- Education: Harvard University
- Occupation: Real estate developer
- Spouse: Ruth Worms
- Children: Ellen Rosenthal; Jean Harrison
- Parent: Julius Tishman
- Family: Robert Tishman (nephew); John L. Tishman (nephew)

Paul Tishman (1900–1996) was an American real estate developer and collector of African art. Paul Tishman was a member of the long established New York construction and real estate family whose independent development company did major projects in the New York area.

== Early life and education ==
Tishman was born to a Jewish family in 1900, one of five sons of Julius Tishman. In 1921, he graduated from Harvard University. He also did graduate work at the Massachusetts Institute of Technology and Columbia University.

== Career ==
In 1924, Tishman joined the Tishman Realty and Construction Company which was founded by his father in 1898 where he rose to the rank of senior vice president and director. In 1949, he left Tishman Realty and formed his own construction company, Paul Tishman Inc. His company focused on urban renewal and the building of university, hospital, and government buildings. His firm was responsible for beginning the construction of Washington Square Village, which was halted after only two buildings were completed due to local opposition. It was eventually completed by New York University. He also built the Student Art Center at Sarah Lawrence College in Yonkers, the Ravenswood Houses in Astoria, Queens, and Concord Village in Brooklyn. Tishman retired in 1969.

== Philanthropy ==
Tishman served as a director of the Urban League, the Legal Aid Society, the New York League for the Hard of Hearing, and was a member of the visiting committee of the primitive art department at the Metropolitan Museum of Art.

== Personal life ==
Tishman predeceased his wife of 70 years, the former Ruth Worms (1905–1999); two daughters, Ellen Rosenthal and Jean Harrison, and six grandchildren and nine great-grandchildren. Tishman was a collector of African art. His collection was acquired by Walt Disney Productions. In 2005, the Smithsonian National Museum of African Art received the Walt Disney-Tishman Collection of 525 works spanning most major African art styles and 75 cultures.

Allan Sherman parodied Tishman on his last Warner Brothers release (Togetherness, 1967) in the song "If I Were A Tishman" ("All day long I'd buildy-buildy build, if I were a building man...") to the tune of "If I Were a Rich Man" from Fiddler on the Roof.
