= John L. Tishman =

US real estate developer and executive

- Born: John Louis Tishman; January 24, 1926; New York City, New York, U.S.
- Died: February 6, 2016 (aged 90); Bedford, New York, U.S.
- Education: B.S. University of Michigan
- Occupation: Real estate developer
- Spouse: Suzanne Weisberg
- Children: Daniel Tishman; Katherine Tishman Blacklock
- Family: Robert Tishman (cousin); Paul Tishman (uncle)

John Louis Tishman (January 24, 1926 – February 6, 2016) was an American real-estate developer, and chief executive officer of Tishman Realty & Construction.

== Life ==
John Louis Tishman was born to Jewish parents, Rose and Louis Tishman, on January 24, 1926, in New York City. His father worked in the family construction business founded by his grandfather Julius Tishman and died when he was 4. In 1946, he graduated from University of Michigan, where he studied electrical engineering. After school, he served in the United States Navy and then taught mathematics before joining the family construction business, Tishman Realty & Construction, then run by his uncle David Tishman (father of Robert Tishman, the co-founder of Tishman Speyer Properties). The firm acted as both a developer and general contractor until 1980, when it became solely a construction firm.

He was manager during the construction of Madison Square Garden, the John Hancock Center, and the first World Trade Center.

== Philanthropy ==
He established the Tishman Construction Management Program, at University of Michigan, with a $5 million gift. He supported the New School, with a $1 million gift.

== Personal life ==
In 1953, he married Suzanne Weisberg (died 2005); they had two children, Daniel Russell Tishman and Katherine Tishman Blacklock. His son Dan is chairman and CEO of the family company renamed the Tishman Construction Corporation.

== Death ==
Tishman died on February 6, 2016, at his home in Bedford, New York.
