= Anbang =

Chinese financial services company

Anbang Insurance Group
- Native name: 安邦保险集团
- Type: Private
- Industry: Financial services
- Founded: 2004; 22 years ago
- Defunct: 2020
- Headquarters: Beijing, China
- Area served: China
- Key people: Wu Xiaohui, Chairman & GM
- Products: Diversified Insurance
- Website: www.anbanggroup.com

Anbang Insurance Group (Chinese: 安邦保险集团; pinyin: Ānbāng Bǎoxiǎn Jítuán) was a Chinese holding company whose subsidiaries mainly deal with insurance, banking, and financial services based in Beijing. As of February 2017, the company had assets worth more than CN¥1.9 trillion (US$301 billion). The Financial Times described Anbang as "one of China's most politically connected companies."

Anbang was founded by Wu Xiaohui in 2004 as a regional car insurance company. Chen Xiaolu, a prominent princeling and son of Marshal Chen Yi, served as an early director, although Chen stated that he was merely an advisor and not a shareholder. Its founding shareholders included state-owned car maker Shanghai Automotive Industries Corp., which held a 20% stake. In 2005, state-owned oil company Sinopec bought a 20% share in Anbang.

Anbang had more than 30,000 employees in China and was engaged in offering various kinds of insurance and financial products.

Anbang's chairman, Wu Xiaohui, was detained in Beijing by government authorities on June 8, 2017, as an investigation of Anbang's activities. In February 2018, China's insurance regulator took control of Anbang, and Wu was prosecuted. On May 10, 2018, Wu Xiaohui was sentenced to 18 years of imprisonment after he was found guilty of fraud and embezzlement.

== Overseas acquisitions ==
The company holds a geographically diversified portfolio of assets in financial services, real estate and lodging.

- In 2014, Anbang Insurance acquired Fidea Verzekeringen, an insurer based in Belgium.
- In 2014, Anbang Insurance purchased the Waldorf Astoria New York hotel from Hilton Hotels for nearly US$2 billion.
- In 2015 Anbang purchased Dutch insurer VIVAT from the Netherlands. Anbang paid the Netherlands €150m outright, and agreed to infuse between €770m and €1bn in fresh capital, and to take on €550m of debt.
- In 2015 Anbang paid US$1 billion for a 57.5% stake in South Korea's Tongyang Life, an insurance company, in what was reported to be the first direct investment in a South Korean financial institution by a mainland China entity.
- In November 2015, Anbang announced that it would buy Iowa-based insurer Fidelity & Guaranty Life for about $1.57 billion. However, this deal never came to fruition.
- In February 2016, the Financial Post in Canada reported that Anbang planned to purchase a 66% stake in four office towers of Bentall Centre in Vancouver from Ivanhoe Cambridge, a subsidiary of Caisse de dépôt et placement du Québec; and subsequently remaining 33% stake in May 2016. Terms of the deal were undisclosed. However, the price paid by Anbang is reported to value the property at over CAD$1 Billion.
- In March 2016, Blackstone agreed to a further US$6.5 billion sale of 16 landmark US hotels owned by the Strategic Hotels & Resorts REIT, including the historic Hotel del Coronado near San Diego, the Westin St. Francis in San Francisco, several Four Seasons resorts, and Manhattan's JW Marriott Essex House hotel.
- In April 2016, Anbang purchased Allianz's South Korea operations.

- In 2016, Anbang purchased Retirement Concepts, a Canadian company with 24 retirement homes in British Columbia, Calgary and Montreal. The company was later criticised after three of the retirement homes on Vancouver Island were put under the management of the health authority due to reported inadequate care of facility residents in December 2019.

Anbang has also made large-scale bids that did not culminate in a transaction. On March 14, 2016, a consortium led by Anbang made a US$14 billion offer for Starwood. Other members of the consortium included J.C. Flowers & Co and Primavera Capital Group. The latter is headed by Fred Hu, the former chairman of Greater China at Goldman Sachs. The bid was ultimately unsuccessful. In 2017, the company also ended talks to invest billions of dollars in a Manhattan office tower (666 Fifth Avenue) owned by the family of Jared Kushner, President Trump's son-in-law and a senior White House aide.

== Liquidation ==
On 14 September 2020, Reuters reported that Anbang would disband and liquidate the company.
