= Morton S. Wolf =

American executive (1907–1976)

- Born: Morton Sharp Wolf; January 5, 1907; Yonkers, New York, U.S.
- Died: June 5, 1976 (aged 69); New Rochelle, New York, U.S.
- Occupation: Real estate executive
- Spouse: Rebecca J. Williams (m. 1941)
- Children: 2

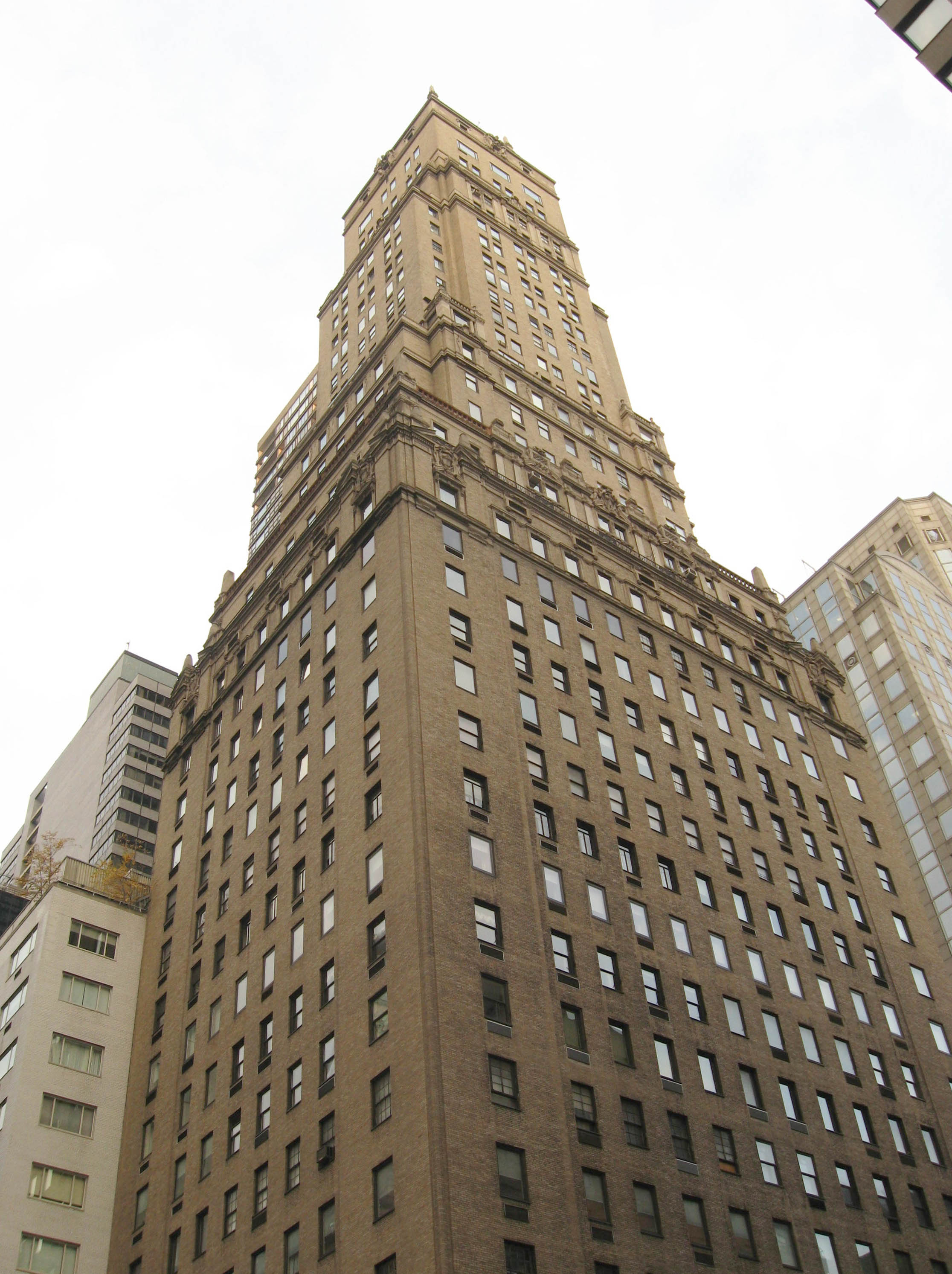
The Ritz Tower, a New York City Landmark

Morton Sharp Wolf (January 5, 1907 – June 5, 1976) was a real estate executive from New York City.

== Early life ==
Morton Sharp Wolf was born on January 5, 1907, in Yonkers, New York, to Bertha (née Sharp) and Morton Wolf. His father was a physician and immigrant from Hungary.

== Career ==
Wolf founded Spencer-Taylor Inc., a real estate development and hotel management firm, with his brother Charles S. Wolf. The headquarters was on 100 East 42nd Street in New York City. Under his direction, Spencer-Taylor operated the Ritz Tower, Delmonico, the Mayflower, Surrey, One Fifth Avenue, Beaux-Arts, and Peter Cooper hotels. He conceived and developed a number of real estate projects, including Washington Square Village in New York City, and contributed to the Renaissance I building projects in the Golden Triangle in Pittsburgh, which included Chatham Center. As part of the Chatham project, he put a hotel on top of an office building.

Wolf was a real estate consultant for the State Department under President Harry S. Truman in 1950. He served on the board of St. Vincent's Hospital and was a real estate consultant for the Archdiocese of New York.

== Personal life ==
Wolf married Rebecca "Betty" J. Williams on June 1, 1941. They had a daughter and son, Elizabeth J. and Morton Frederick. They lived on Park Avenue. He died on June 5, 1976, aged 69, in New Rochelle Hospital. He lived in Larchmont, New York.

== Legacy ==
Wolf's daughter Elizabeth established a fund with The New York Community Trust after Wolf and his wife. The fund supports New York City public school visual arts and music programs and post-secondary school scholarships.
