= Alan V. Tishman =

American real estate developer

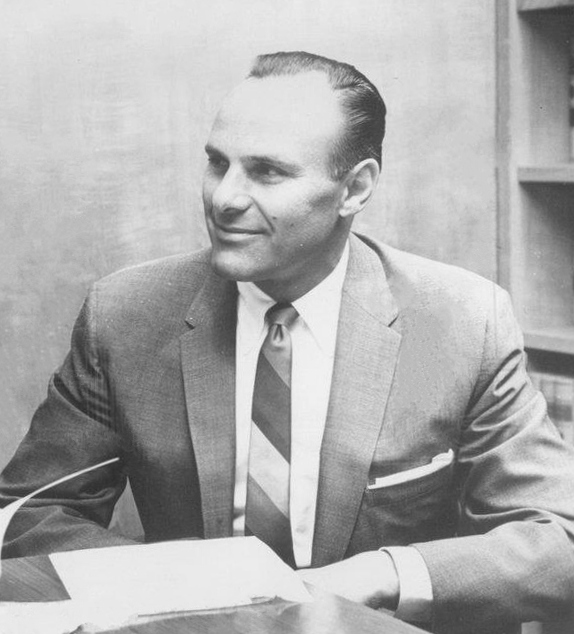
- Tishman in 1963
- Born: Alan Valentine Tishman; October 12, 1917; United States
- Died: January 13, 2004 (aged 86)
- Occupation: Real estate developer
- Spouse: Margaret Westheimer
- Children: 3
- Family: Robert Tishman (brother)

Alan Valentine Tishman (October 12, 1917 – January 13, 2004) was an American real estate developer and head of Tishman Management and Leasing Corporation.

== Biography ==
Born to a Jewish family, Tishman helped bring coop apartment ownership to New York City and was one of the first brokers to bring office tenants to Park Avenue.

His political activism landed him on the master list of Nixon political opponents. He was a trustee of the American Museum of Natural History and served as vice president of the UJA Federation.

== Personal life ==
He was married to Margaret Westheimer Tishman who died in 2004. They had two daughters: Pat Tishman Hall and Virginia "Nina" Tishman Alexander; and one son, David Tishman. His daughter Nina died in 1999. Tishman died on January 13, 2004; services were held at Temple Shaaray Tefila in Manhattan.
