= Wu Xiaohui =

Chinese businessman

- Born: 1966 (age 59–60); Pingyang County, Zhejiang, China
- Occupation: businessman
- Known for: Anbang, fraud, embezzlement
- Title: Chairman and CEO, Anbang Insurance Group
- Term: 2004 - 2017
- Spouse: Zhuo Ran (sep. 2015)
- Children: 1 son
- Relatives: Grandfather-in-law: Deng Xiaoping; Siblings: Wu Xiaoxia, Wu Jiaqi, Wu Xiaoyi, Wu Jiaxi

Wu Xiaohui (Chinese: 吴小晖; born 1966) is a Chinese businessman, the former chairman and chief executive of Anbang Insurance Group, then one of the largest insurers in China. In May 2018, he was sentenced to 18 years imprisonment on charges of fraud and embezzlement.

== Biography ==
Wu Xiaohui was born in 1966 in Pingyang County, Wenzhou, Zhejiang province.

Over a ten-year period beginning with Anbang's founding in 2004, Wu transformed the insurer from a minor player in China's insurance market to a high-profile global investment firm. As of mid-March 2016, Anbang claims to have assets of RMB1.65 trillion, or about US$253 billion. He is known for negotiating large transactions without the support of investment bankers, and according to the Financial Times "makes all the key decisions" for Anbang.

== Investigation and conviction ==
On 8 June 2017, Wu Xiaohui was taken away from Anbang's offices by police, stood down as chairman and was detained by the authorities. He was investigated for economic crimes in China's sweeping review of systemic risk. China regulators took control of Anbang before prosecuting its chairman for fraud. On 28 March 2018 Wu pled guilty to charges brought against him that he had raised money in excess of what is allowed by regulations, as well as other crimes. He asked the court for leniency in his sentencing. On 10 May, Wu has been sentenced to 18 years in prison for fundraising fraud and embezzlement. Wu will also have his $1.7 billion worth of assets seized.

== Personal life ==
He was married to Zhuo Ran, the granddaughter of Deng Xiaoping, the former Chinese paramount leader, until their separation in 2015.
