= Abe Feder =

American lighting designer (1908–1997)

- Born: Abraham Hyman Feder; July 27, 1908; Milwaukee, Wisconsin, U.S.
- Died: April 24, 1997 (aged 88); Manhattan, New York, U.S.
- Occupations: Stage lighting designer, architectural lighting designer

Abraham Hyman Feder (July 27, 1908, Milwaukee, Wisconsin – April 24, 1997, Manhattan, New York) was an American lighting designer. He is regarded as the creator of lighting design for the theatre and was the country's leading consultant in architectural and urban lighting.

The lights at Rockefeller Center and the Empire State Building were turned off for one hour in Feder's honor after his death.
