= Robert Tishman =

American businessman

- Born: Robert Valentine Tishman; April 7, 1916; Manhattan, New York, United States
- Died: October 11, 2010 (aged 94)
- Occupation: Real estate developer
- Known for: co-founder of Tishman Speyer
- Spouse: Phyllis Gordon (m. 1941; died 1985)
- Children: 2
- Family: Paul Tishman (uncle); John L. Tishman (cousin); Jerry Speyer (son-in-law); Alan V. Tishman (brother)

Robert Valentine Tishman (April 7, 1916 – October 11, 2010) was an American real estate developer who was head of the family-owned firm Tishman Realty & Construction until it was disestablished in 1977, and was one of the two founding partners of Tishman Speyer, which was formed in 1978 and became one of the largest owners and builders of office buildings in the United States.

== Early life and education ==
Tishman was born on April 7, 1916, into a Jewish family in Manhattan. His father David Tishman headed the family firm of Tishman Realty & Construction. The firm had been established in 1898 by his grandfather Julius Tishman, who used the proceeds of his department store in upstate New York to build a six-story tenement building on the Lower East Side.

Robert attended the Horace Mann School, then Cornell University, where he was elected to the Sphinx Head honor society and was the editor of the Cornell Widow. After graduating in 1937, he attended Columbia Law School. In June 1941, he married the former Phyllis Gordon, who had attended Wellesley College and the New York University School of Law, in a ceremony held at the Lombardy Hotel and officiated by Rabbi Nathan A. Perilman of Temple Emanu-El. During World War II, Tishman served on a United States Navy destroyer in the Pacific Ocean.

== Career ==
After completing his military service, he went back to work with the family business.

During the 1960s and 1970s, Tishman was president and chief executive officer of Tishman Realty and Construction, where he oversaw the construction of Madison Square Garden, the World Trade Center, the Tishman Building at 666 Fifth Avenue, and other projects. Expanding outside of New York City, the firm's projects included the Century Plaza Towers in Los Angeles commissioned by Alcoa, the John Hancock Center in Chicago, and Detroit's Renaissance Center. In a 1968 interview with Business Week magazine, Tishman described the company as "an intercompany conglomerate" that could identify building sites and help in all phases of design, financing and construction, offering "capabilities that no other owner-builder or general contractor matches".

Tishman liquidated the original firm in 1977, and established Tishman Speyer the following year with his son-in-law Jerry Speyer, as the firm's founding chairman. The new firm developed more than 300 building projects around the world, including the Torre Norte skyscraper in São Paulo, Brazil, as well as the Equitable Center on Seventh Avenue in New York and the Sony Center at Potsdamer Platz in Berlin. As of 2010, the firm owned and managed some 166,000,000 square feet (15,400,000 m^{2}) of commercial property, including the Chrysler Building and Rockefeller Center. At the time of his death, Tishman Speyer was working as construction manager of a building at 510 Madison Avenue and was project manager of One World Trade Center, the tallest structure in the city. In his obituary in The New York Times, Speyer said Tishman worked every day in the firm's offices until two years before his death.

Tishman served as Chairman of the Real Estate Board of New York from 1966 to 1979, having been a member of the organization for 52 years. He was chairman, and then Honorary Chairman, of Montefiore Medical Center in the Bronx, Associate Chairman and Charter Trustee of the Jewish Association for Services for the Aged, Trustee of the Citizens Budget Commission, a member of the Real Estate Advisory Committee of Cornell University, a member of the Board of Directors of Boys & Girls Harbor, Director of the Citizen's Housing and Planning Council, and was an Honorary Director of the Grand Street Settlement.

== Death ==
Tishman died at the age of 94 on October 11, 2010, at his home in Manhattan. He is survived by his two daughters, Lynne Speyer and Nancy Gonchar, six grandchildren and 12 great-grandchildren. His wife Phyllis Gordon had died in July 1985. After his death, a named professorship was established in his honor at the Cornell Tech campus in New York City.
