= Tishman Speyer =

American real estate investment corporation

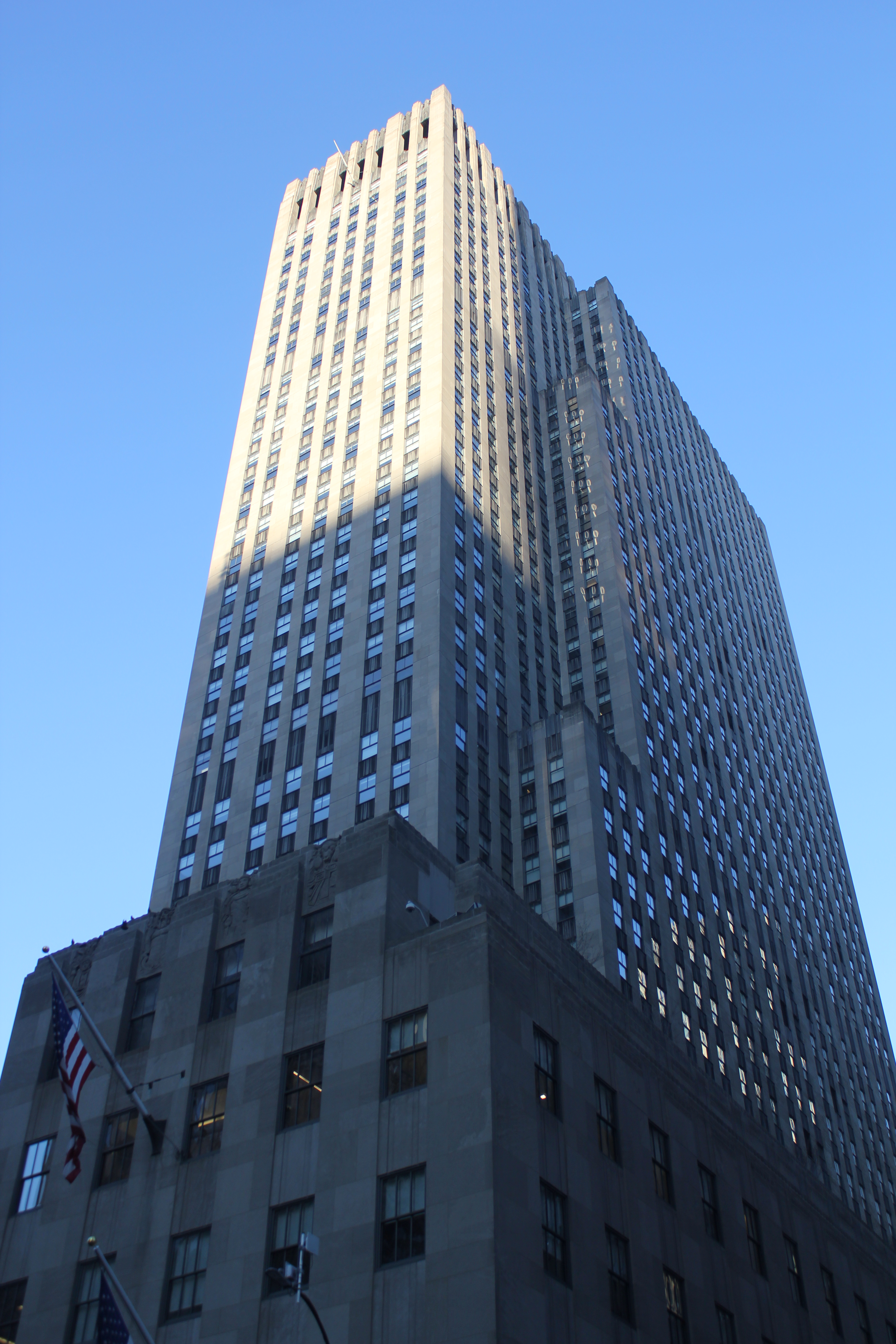
- Headquarters at 45 Rockefeller Plaza in Midtown Manhattan
- Type: Private
- Industry: Real estate
- Founded: 1978; 48 years ago
- Founder: Jerry Speyer; Robert Tishman
- Headquarters: 45 Rockefeller Plaza; New York, NY 10111; U.S.
- Area served: New York City, Jersey City, London, Madrid, Milan, São Paulo
- Key people: Jerry Speyer (chairman); Rob Speyer (president and CEO); Joseph Doran (CFO)
- Services: Land development Property management Fund management
- AUM: $57 billion (Q3 2020)
- Number of employees: 3000
- Website: tishmanspeyer.com

Tishman Speyer is an American multinational corporation based at 45 Rockefeller Plaza in Midtown Manhattan. The conglomerate invests in high-profile real estate properties, has developed multiple buildings around the world, and owns numerous famous buildings and land plots, including the Chrysler Building and Rockefeller Center.

== History ==
The firm was founded in 1978 by Robert Tishman and Jerry Speyer.

In March 1988, the company announced its first project in Europe, the construction of a 70-story tower in Frankfurt, Germany, the Messeturm, the tallest tower in Western Europe.

In May 1988, the company acquired the headquarters of J. C. Penney for $350 million in partnership with Trammell Crow Real Estate Investors.

In 1996, the company entered into a joint venture to construct a $175 million, 36-story office building in São Paulo, Brazil.

In 1998, in partnership with The Travelers Companies, the company paid $230 million to acquire the mortgage secured by the Chrysler Building from Fuji Bank.

In 2000, in partnership with Lester Crown, the company acquired Rockefeller Center for $1.85 billion.

In 2002, the company sold Millbank Tower for £115 million.

In 2005, the company acquired the MetLife Building for $1.72 billion.

In 2006, the company acquired Stuyvesant Town in partnership with BlackRock. In 2010, the property was surrendered to its lenders.

In December 2006, the company sold 666 Fifth Avenue for $1.8 billion to Kushner Companies.

In 2007, the company began development of a new Yankee Stadium.

In September 2007, the company bought a 6.6 million square foot office portfolio in Chicago from The Blackstone Group for $1.8 billion.

In 2008, a joint venture between the company and German investors sold a 90% interest in the Chrysler Building to the government of Abu Dhabi, with the company retaining a 10% interest and the management rights of the building.

In October 2010, co-founder Robert Tishman died.

In November 2010, the company acquired an office tower in Chicago for $380 million, which was less than the cost of constructing the tower. (see also 2008 financial crisis)

In August 2013, the company acquired 190 South LaSalle, an 800,000 square foot office tower in Chicago, from CBRE Group Global Investors for $211 million.

In September 2013, the company formed a joint venture to develop a 3 million square foot mixed-use project in Shanghai.

In 2015, the company received a $1.4 billion loan on the MetLife Building and the property was appraised at $3 billion.

In 2016, the company acquired the CNN Building, an office tower in Los Angeles for $127 million.

In 2020, according to an announcement by the New York firm, TST, also known as Tin's Secret, bought Tower 2 at Tishman Speyer's Crystal Plaza project in Pudong, charging the equivalent of RMB 68,445 per square meter for a land of 26,305 square meters (283,145 square feet). In July 2020, Tishman Speyer recruited Gary Rodney to occupy the new position of the New York-based firm's managing director of affordable housing.

In January 2021, TS Innovation Acquisitions Corp., a blank-check vehicle sponsored by Tishman Speyer, merged with the smart-lock and building-management software startup Latch Inc., valuing the combined company at $1.56 billion and injecting around $450 million into the startup. Latch joined the Nasdaq with the ticker symbol LTCH. As sponsor of TS Innovation Acquisitions Corp., Tishman Speyer was reported to receive a stake of approximately 4% in Latch, worth around $60 million at the time of the deal's closing.

In October 2026, the company re-acquired the Chrysler Building, for $235 million.

== Properties ==
Some of the properties that Tishman Speyer owns and operates include:

- Rockefeller Center in Midtown Manhattan
- MetLife Building in Midtown Manhattan
- CitySpire Center in Midtown Manhattan
- The Franklin in Chicago
- 125 High Street in Boston
- One Federal Street in Boston

Some major developments include:

- The Spiral in Hudson Yards
- Mission Rock in San Francisco

== See also ==
- Murder of Ana Walshe, a Tishman Speyer executive
