= Tishman (company) =

American construction company

THR Management LP
- Type: Private
- Industry: Real estate
- Founded: 1898; 128 years ago
- Founder: Julius Tishman
- Headquarters: NYC Live, New York City
- Key people: Daniel R. Tishman (Principal and vice chairman)
- Website: www.tishman.com

THR Management LP, commonly referred to as Tishman, is an American corporation founded in 1898 that owns and develops real estate. The company is best known for being the contractor that built the original World Trade Center and later the One World Trade Center in New York City. Tishman Construction Corporation, the construction division of the company, was sold to AECOM in 2010.

== History ==
Julius Tishman started Julies Tishman and Sons in 1898. As a Polish immigrant, he entered the real estate business by saving enough money to purchase the tenement building where he lived, acquiring additional residential properties and gaining the ability to renovate, lease and finance them independently. The company went public in 1928 as Tishman Realty & Construction, becoming an integrated real estate and construction firm.

Tishman Realty & Construction worked on significant projects around New York in the 1960s and 1970s, including Madison Square Garden and the World Trade Center.

This public company liquidated in 1976, selling the Tishman Research and Construction company to Rockefeller Center Inc.

The primary shareholders began three separate private companies: a continuation of Tishman Realty & Construction, a real estate development company called Tishman Speyer, and a leasing company called Tishman Management and Leasing Corporation.

== Tishman Hotel & Realty LP ==
Tishman Hotel & Realty LP (THR) is a subsidiary that focuses primarily on large, complex properties with a long-term ownership strategy. THR comprises a diversified staff of experienced real estate, financial and hotel management specialists, and complemented by a technical staff of architects, engineers, and construction management professionals. THR's affiliate, Tishman Construction Corporation, provides a wide range of construction services for projects of varying scope, budget, schedule, and complexity. Given these broad resources, THR typically manages all components of its projects, from feasibility, design, budgeting, financing and development management to ongoing property and asset management.

=== List of Tishman Hotel & Realty LP properties ===
- The Westin New York at Times Square
- E Walk Retail on 42nd Street (Connected to the Westin)
- Walt Disney World Dolphin (co-owned with MetLife)
- Walt Disney World Swan (co-owned with Metlife)
- Hilton in the Walt Disney World Resort
- Sheraton Chicago and Hotel Towers
- Aloft Chicago Mag Mile
- Homewood Suites Lake Buena Vista
- Hilton Garden Inn Lake Buena Vista
- Homewood Suites Theme Parks/Sea World Orlando

== Tishman Construction Corporation ==
The Tishman Construction Corporation was a construction division of the company until 2010, when it was sold to AECOM. It was a privately held firm headquartered in New York City, with operating subsidiaries located across the United States. It was owned by Dan Tishman, who is now a member of the board of directors for AECOM. Tishman Construction served as Construction Manager for One World Trade Center and the World Trade Center Transportation Hub.

=== List of properties built by Tishman Construction Corporation ===
- Central Plaza, Los Angeles, CA (1952)
- 666 Fifth Avenue, Manhattan, New York, NY (1957)
- Tishman Building, 3325 Wilshire Boulevard, Los Angeles, CA (1957)
- East Ohio Building Cleveland, OH (1957-1958)
- 10 Lafayette Square, Buffalo, NY (1957-1958)
- Wilshire Terrace Apartments, Los Angeles, CA, (1958)
- Tishman 615 Building, 811 Wilshire Boulevard, Los Angeles, CA (1960)
- Southbridge Towers, Manhattan, New York, NY (1961-1971)
- Gateway Towers, Pittsburgh, PA (1964)
- John Hancock Center, Chicago, IL (1965-1968)
- Two Pennsylvania Plaza, Manhattan, New York, NY (1967-1968)
- World Trade Center, Manhattan, New York, NY (1967-1973) (Destroyed during the terrorist attacks of September 11, 2001)
- 919 Third Avenue, Manhattan, New York, NY (1970-1971)
- Renaissance Center, Detroit, MI (1973-1981)
- FourFortyFour South Flower Building, Los Angeles, CA, (1978-1981)
- Marriott World Trade Center, Manhattan, New York, NY (1979-1981) (Destroyed during the terrorist attacks of September 11, 2001)
- Camelback Lakes Office Park, Phoenix, AZ (1981)
- Epcot Theme Park, Bay Lake, FL, (1982)
- 7 World Trade Center, Manhattan, New York, NY (1984-1987) (Destroyed during the terrorist attacks of September 11, 2001)
- Tower 49, Manhattan, New York, NY (1985)
- Orange Executive Tower, Orange, CA (1986-1987)
- Ronald Reagan State Building, Los Angeles, CA (1988-1990)
- 3 Times Square, Manhattan, New York, NY (1998-2001)
- 745 Seventh Avenue, Manhattan, New York, NY (1999-2001)
- 425 Fifth Avenue, Manhattan, New York, NY (2001-2003)
- 7 World Trade Center, Manhattan, New York, NY (2002-2006)
- Bank of America Tower, Manhattan, New York, NY (2004-2009)
- One World Trade Center, Manhattan, New York, NY (2006-2014)
- Four Seasons Hotel, Manhattan, New York, NY (2007-2016)
- 4 World Trade Center, Manhattan, New York, NY (2008-2014)
- 3 World Trade Center, Manhattan, New York, NY (2010-2018)
- 30 Hudson Yards, Manhattan, New York, NY (2014-2019)
- 1 Manhattan West, Manhattan, New York, NY (2018-2019)
- 11 Hoyt, Brooklyn, New York, NY (2017-2020)
- One Vanderbilt, Manhattan, New York, NY (2017-2020)

== Overbilling probe ==
In December 2015, Tishman agreed to settle an overbilling probe for a fee of $20.2 million, resolving a US-led investigation into alleged fraudulent overbilling. The scheme involved improper overtime payments to union workers.

== See also ==
- Tishman Speyer
- John L. Tishman
