= Kips Bay Towers =

Residential buildings in Manhattan, New York

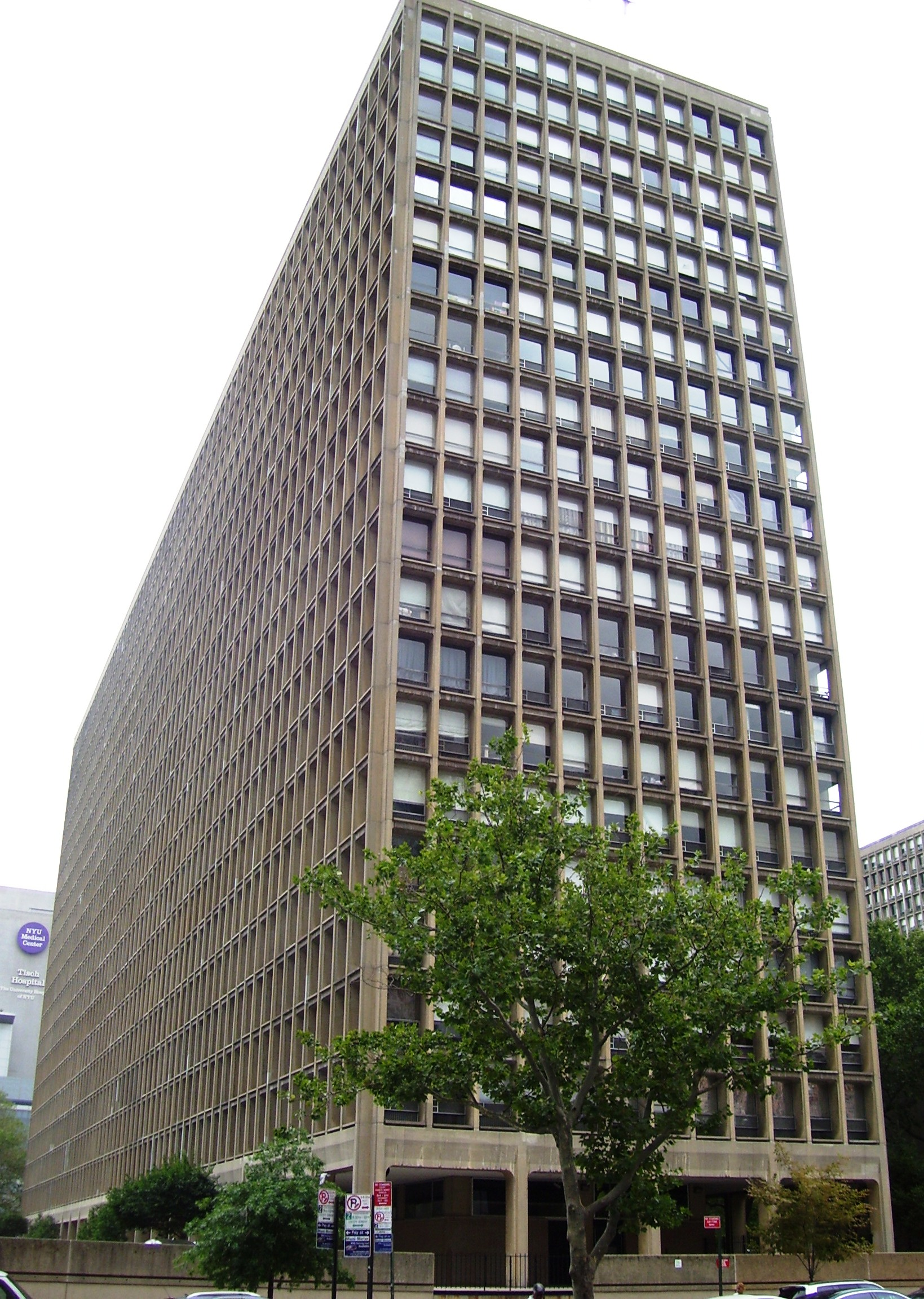
- North Building (2010)
- Interactive map of the Kips Bay Towers area

General information
- Status: Completed
- Type: Residential
- Architectural style: Brutalist
- Location: 30th Street to 33rd Street between First Avenue and Second Avenue; Manhattan, New York, United States
- Coordinates: 40°44′34″N 73°58′33″W
- Opening: 1960 (south tower), 1965 (north tower)

Technical details
- Floor count: 20

Design and construction
- Architects: I.M. Pei, S. J. Kessler and James Ingo Freed
- Developer: Webb & Knapp
- Structural engineer: August Komendant
- Main contractor: Webb & Knapp Construction Corporation

Kips Bay Towers is a 1,118-unit, two-building condominium complex in the Kips Bay neighborhood of Manhattan, New York City, New York. The complex was designed by architects I.M. Pei and S. J. Kessler, with the involvement of James Ingo Freed, in the brutalist style and completed in 1965. Originally known as Kips Bay Plaza, the project was developed by Webb & Knapp as middle-income rental apartments, but was converted to condominiums in the mid-1980s.

The complex occupies an area of three city blocks, or approximately 7.5 acres (3.0 ha), bounded by First and Second avenues and East 30th and 33rd streets and includes two residential high-rise buildings each with 20 floors. Additionally, there is a three-acre private garden between the two towers featuring landscaped lawns as well as recreational spaces. Kips Bay Towers is home to more than 4,000 residents.

== History ==
=== NYU–Bellevue project (1952–1957) ===
==== Early plans ====
The development originated as a slum clearance project under Title I of the federal Housing Act of 1949. In the mid-1940s, when the new site for the New York University-Bellevue Medical Center was being planned on the east side of First Avenue between East 30th and 34th streets, leaders from New York University (NYU) indicated that there would be a need for the city to clear the slums on the west side of First Avenue. At a conference held in January 1949 to preview updated plans for the new medical center, City Construction Coordinator Robert Moses said "west of this area a great deal remains to be done" and revealed that discussions were taking place for the development of a state housing project on First Avenue opposite Bellevue Hospital, which would be a start in making improvements in the area to the west.

In November 1952, the city's Committee on Slum Clearance Plans, which was also headed by Moses, announced plans to survey the area bounded by First and Second avenues and East 30th and 33rd streets for the purposes of condemning the land and redeveloping the site with middle-income housing. NYU-Bellevue Medical Center provided $25,000 for the survey. The medical center had a particular interest in the urban renewal project as it was facing a shortage of housing for staff and personnel at its new complex located on First Avenue across the street from the proposed redevelopment.

Initially referred to as the NYU–Bellevue project, the original plans called for redeveloping the three-block site with five 14-story residential buildings containing a total of 840 apartments along with stores along Second Avenue, a six-story professional building on First Avenue, and a 160-space parking garage. About three quarters of the land would be left open and used for landscaped areas, playgrounds, or parking. To create the superblock between First and Second avenues, the city would swap its ownership of 31st and 32nd streets in exchange for widening the streets along the perimeter of the site.

==== Land clearing ====
The blocks proposed for condemnation contained 108 residential buildings occupied by 1,366 families; most of these were Old Law tenements built before 1900. Other residences on the site included the first Phipps Houses, at 321–337 East 31st Street, designed by Grosvenor Atterbury in 1906. The project would also involve the razing of 168 stores, several garages and lofts, a laundromat, a dairy, and a stable, as well as the Nathan Straus branch of the New York Public Library. The New York City Planning Commission and New York City Board of Estimate approved the project in August 1953 and February 1954, respectively. After the land was condemned by the city, it was sold in December 1954 to University Center, Inc., the private sponsor of the project, which was a group of 93 investors headed by David Moss. James H. Scheuer unsuccessfully sought to sponsor Moss's project; he alleged that his sponsorship offer was ignored.

By June 1956, only seven buildings on the site had been razed and Robert Moses called for the developer to move faster or relinquish its contract. Delays to the project were attributed to the original sponsor's difficulty in obtaining a mortgage for financing; the large number of investors had also made it difficult to gain consensus in putting up more of their own money until a mortgage was secured. Apart from the usual difficulties of finding new housing for the displaced tenants, the project sponsor was also faced with the challenges of relocating a flock of 100 homing pigeons that resided atop a tenement at 328 East 33rd Street. The developers of the superblock had failed to pay taxes, and the New York City government was looking to take control of the site. At the time, a master plan for the site was being drawn up by Gordon Bunshaft and other architects at the firm of Skidmore, Owings & Merrill.

=== Kips Bay Plaza (1957–1972) ===
==== Construction ====
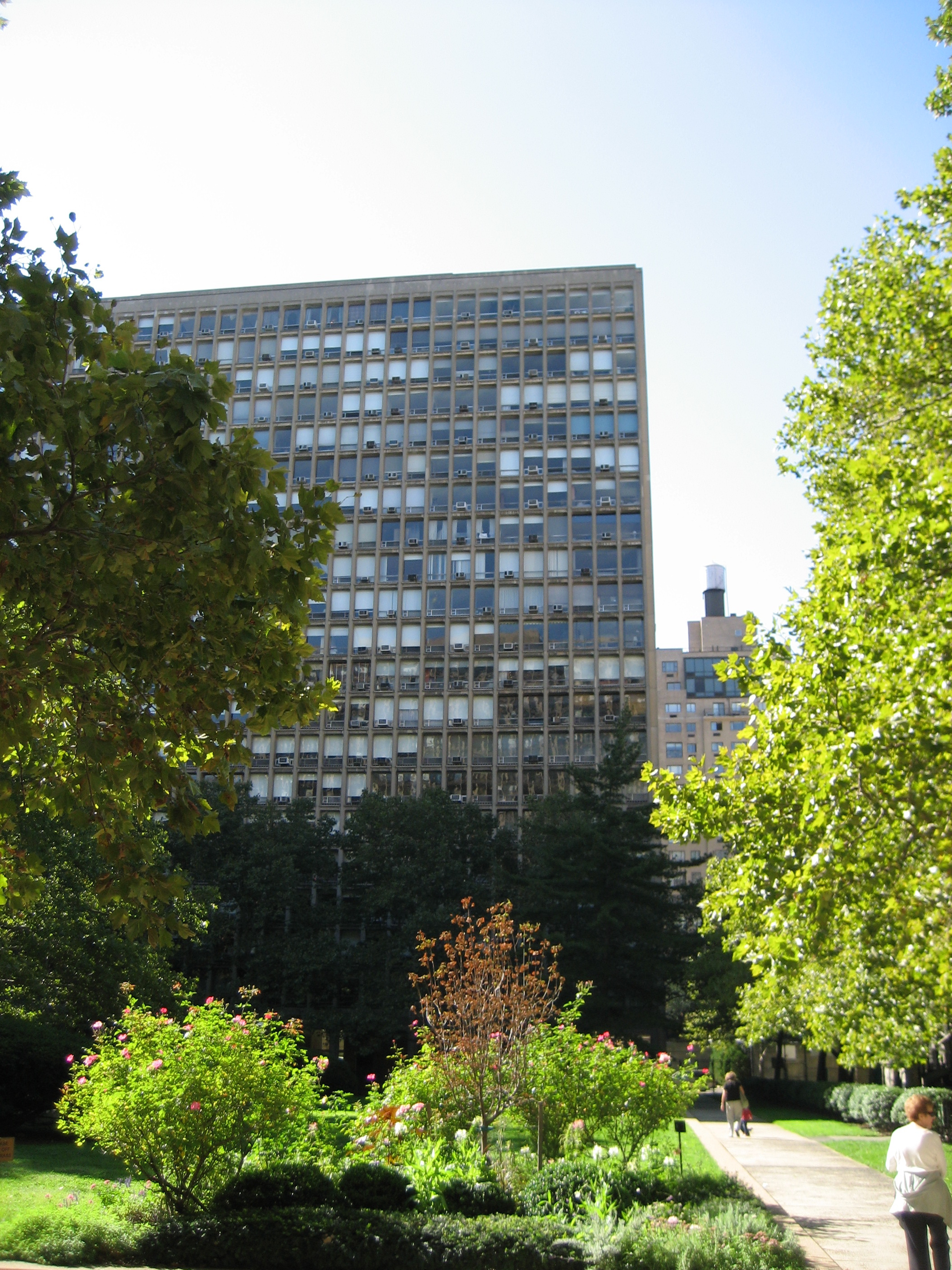
A three-acre private garden is located between the two 20-story apartment towers.

The Committee on Slum Clearance Plans ultimately forced University Center, Inc. to surrender the NYU-Bellevue project, which was taken over by Webb & Knapp in June 1957. Bunshaft initially advised I. M. Pei of Webb & Knapp's architectural team against taking over as the development's architect, and Pei agreed, calling it "just another housing project". William Zeckendorf, the head of Webb & Knapp and one of Pei's frequent collaborators, nonetheless assigned Pei to the project. In addition to changing the name of the project to Kips Bay Plaza, Webb & Knapp modified the site plan to reduce the number of buildings, electing to construct two 20-story apartment towers on the north and south sides of the superblock. The buildings were oriented so they faced away from each other. Pei said that, by reducing the number of buildings and adding a large open space between the structure, he hoped to "take the project-itis out of" Kips Bay Plaza (referring to the fact that public housing developments were colloquially referred to as "the projects"). These changes also created additional space for gardens and parks.

In an interview, Pei recalled that Zeckendorf "was willing to gamble with me on using concrete" in Kips Bay Plaza's construction, at a time when most apartment towers used brick. Pei had originally wanted a large sculpture by Picasso placed in the open space at the center of the site—an area that was once accessible to the general public—but Zeckendorf told Pei that he could have either the sculpture or fifty saplings. Pei chose the trees, and the Picasso sculpture was instead installed at University Village, another complex designed by Pei. The plan for the site also included a shopping center along Second Avenue with a movie theater, a professional building on First Avenue, and a 250-space underground parking garage. The professional building would have housed ten stories of medical offices. Because Pei had a reputation for being a perfectionist, contractors initially either refused to submit bids for the project or submitted overly high bids, forcing Pei to simplify his plans.

After the Federal Housing Administration (FHA) approved $8,436,000 in mortgage insurance for the project, a groundbreaking ceremony for the long-delayed project was held on March 31, 1959. Julian H. Zimmerman, a commissioner of the FHA, characterized the project as "a stone and steel testimonial to the workability of the FHA program for upgrading center city areas". A last-minute change to the plans was approved in January 1960; the revised plans increased the number of rooms in the development from 3,360 to 3,680 and provided more land for the professional building. Zeckendorf later recalled that the towers proved that "housing need not be monstrous".

==== Completion and early years ====
The south tower opened in December 1960 with the showing of model apartments to prospective tenants. Five designers were hired to decorate model apartments in a Danish, Italian, English, Japanese, or French style. Webb and Knapp hired Herbert Charles & Co. at the beginning of 1961 to rent out the apartments; within four months, 375 units had been rented out. The movie theater in the shopping center was designed to be a "luxury" showcase of first run films; it opened on October 16, 1962, when it hosted the double premiere of Requiem for a Heavyweight along with the Criterion Theatre.

Meanwhile, Webb and Knapp and London–based firm Second Covent Garden Property Company Ltd had formed the Zeckendorf Property Corporation in late 1961 to take over ownership of the development. To provide additional financing to complete the project, the Zeckendorf Property Corporation sold Kips Bay Plaza to the Alcoa Corporation in October 1962. Advertisements for the project continued to carry Webb & Knapp's name until July 1963. The south tower was almost fully occupied by the end of 1962; only a small number of three-bedroom apartments remained unoccupied. Work continued on the north tower and the shopping center along Second Avenue. With the exception of a 36-story apartment building that was completed in 1974 at the southeast corner of Second Avenue and East 34th Street, Kips Bay Plaza did not prompt the development of other new projects in the surrounding area, in part because of the presence of hospitals to the east, a middle-class neighborhood to the west, and the ongoing Bellevue South urban renewal project to the south. The New York Times, in a 1979 interview with Zeckendorf's son William Zeckendorf Jr., said Kips Bay Plaza had been a "fashionable" development that replaced "one of the worst slums in the city".

=== Kips Bay Towers (1972–present) ===
==== 1970s and 1980s ====
In October 1972, Kips Bay Plaza and the adjacent shopping center were purchased from Alcoa by a group led by William Zeckendorf Jr., who paid over $20 million for the complex. The younger Zeckendorf said he had a "great belief in the future of the New York City residential market"; the purchase took place seven years after his father's company Webb & Knapp had gone bankrupt. As part of the change in ownership, the name of the residential towers was changed from Kips Bay Plaza to Kips Bay Towers. Starting in November 1972, the new owner, Kips Bay Towers Inc., issued revised leases to existing tenants who were seeking to renew their leases. The firm sued a tenant who had refused to sign her revised lease; a New York City Civil Court judge ruled in 1975 that the leases had been revised improperly and that Kips Bay Towers Inc. had to repay up to $500,000 to several hundred tenants who had signed leases. The Lee National Corporation bought a majority stake in Kips Bay Towers Inc. in 1979, with plans to convert the buildings into condominiums. Lee paid a reported $40 million for the complex itself and upgraded the buildings for $2 million. NYU had considered purchasing Kips Bay Towers in 1978, which it intended to continue operating as a rental property, but was advised against doing by so primarily due to the strength of the complex's tenant association.

Kips Bay Towers Inc. presented a preliminary condo offering plan to residents in late 1980. Existing tenants had to agree to buy at least 35% of the apartments before the condo offering plan became effective. Over 800 tenants pledged not to buy into the condominium plan, fearing that the condos would be unaffordable and that the buildings would be replaced, prompting Lee to lower prices for existing tenants. The condo offering plan became effective in November 1981, but the conversion was bogged down in litigation with holdout tenants. The garden and playground within Kips Bay Towers, which had been open to the public since the complex had opened, was fenced off and made accessible only to residents in 1983, due to security concerns about the increasing homeless population. This spurred backlash from the surrounding community.

Manhattan borough president Andrew Stein asked the state attorney general's office to investigate the condo conversion in mid-1983, saying that condo conversions at buildings constructed under Title I of the Housing Act of 1949, such as Kips Bay Towers, first had to be approved by two city agencies. Sales were temporarily halted that August. A state judge ruled in May 1984 that the condo offering plans were still valid regardless of the covenant, allowing sales to resume. When sales restarted in July, the costs of the apartments rose by 40% for non-residents. By then, non-residents had bought 20% of the condos, while existing residents had bought another 50%. The condo conversion was done as a non-eviction plan, which allowed renters who refused to buy condominiums to remain and renew their leases. Tenants who agreed to move out were given a buy-out offer of $12,000 for each bedroom in their apartment. By 1986, only nine tenants had accepted the buy-out offer and the others who remained chose to stay as renters.

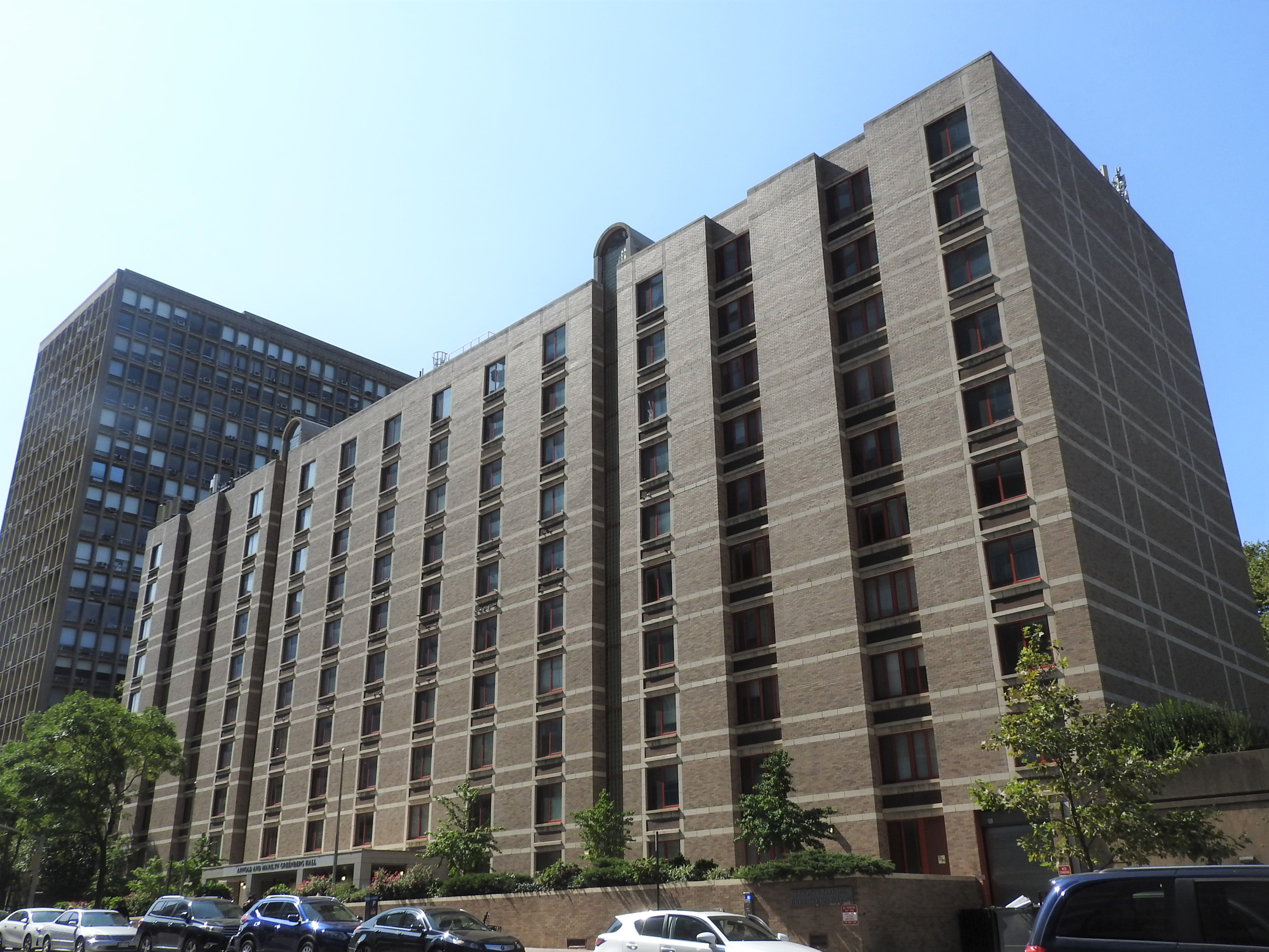
Opened in 1986, Greenberg Hall houses students from the NYU School of Medicine.

While the shopping center on the west side of the superblock had opened in the 1960s, the site along First Avenue that had been allocated for a professional building remained as a vacant, fenced-in lot through the mid-1980s. NYU had first proposed developing a "cooperative care center", a clinic for low-income patients, on the site in 1969. The site was eventually redeveloped into Greenberg Hall, a 10-story building designed by Pomerance & Breines that opened in 1986 and contains 215 apartments used by students from the NYU School of Medicine.

==== 1990s to present ====
By the late 20th and early 21st centuries, Kips Bay Towers' residents included a large number of diplomats and doctors, along with many families. The complex was retrofitted with a water filtration system in 1994 at a cost of $40,000. The system consisted of three 8-foot-tall (2.4 m) tanks, each with five filters, which cleaned the water that came from the New York City water supply system. At the end of the decade, the shopping center along Second Avenue, between 30th and 32nd streets, was redeveloped by the J. D. Carlisle Development Corporation as Kips Bay Plaza. The new retail complex opened in 1999 and included a 15-screen cinema. While the new shopping center was being constructed, a collapse in the shoring around the 35-foot-deep (11 m) excavation caused a landslide and opened up a large hole in the children's playground on Kips Bay Towers complex, requiring it to be rebuilt.

In 2000, the residential hallways received new paint and wallpaper at a cost of $2.5 million. After the hallway renovations were completed, the complex's condominium board forbade residents from hanging up decorations on walls and doors, which was controversial among residents. The residential towers underwent restoration from 2002 to 2006, which included repairs to spalled concrete columns and spandrel beams as well as the replacement of nearly 1,000 precast concrete sills. Six different colors of concrete mortars were used to match the different shades of weathered concrete on the structures. The restoration effort received the Lucy G. Moses Preservation Award from the New York Landmarks Conservancy in 2007.

Kips Bay Towers installed solar panels on the roofs of both of its residential buildings in 2009. Funded by a rebate from New York State Energy Research and Development Authority, the solar array became the city's largest, being able to produce 54 kilowatts (72 hp) of electricity.

In 2010, the Doe Fund submitted an application to the New York City Department of Transportation to convert the service road on Second Avenue between 30th and 33rd streets into a pedestrian plaza, which drew mixed reactions from the local community. A Fairway Market supermarket opened at Kips Bay Plaza in 2012; the complex's other retail tenants at the time included Petco and Staples. The proposal to close Second Avenue's service road was ultimately canceled in 2013 when J. D. Carlisle, the owner of the Kips Bay Plaza shopping center, withdrew its support of the project due to opposition from two of its tenants, AMC Loews and Fairway Market. There were also concerns about the ability of the project sponsor, the Kips Bay Neighborhood Alliance, to fund maintenance of the public space.

The structures were again renovated in the 2010s. By that decade, more than a third of the apartments were being used as pieds-à-terre, rather than as tenants' primary residences; it had one of the highest percentages of pieds-à-terre of any building in Manhattan. In 2018, the segment of East 33rd Street between First and Second avenues was converted from one-way to two-way traffic to improve access for ambulances traveling to emergency entrance of NYU Langone Health on First Avenue. The William Pears Group bought 47 condominiums at Kips Bay Towers in 2022 for $19.4 million. In 2025, NYU Langone purchased the AMC Kips Bay Theater at Kips Bay Plaza, and AMC subsequently announced plans to close the theater by the end of 2026. This prompted local officials to express concern about the shopping center's fate.

== Architecture ==
I. M. Pei was the development's primary architect. S. J. Kessler and Sons were listed as associate architects on the project; the firm had helped design the original plans for University Center, Inc. and was retained by Webb & Knapp to do the working drawings for Kips Bay Plaza. James Ingo Freed was also involved in the design of the towers, and he created a mockup of the complex. The structures are all designed in the brutalist style. There is a three-acre private garden between the two towers featuring landscaped lawns as well as recreational spaces; this garden was open to the public until 1983.

=== Residential towers ===
==== Exterior ====
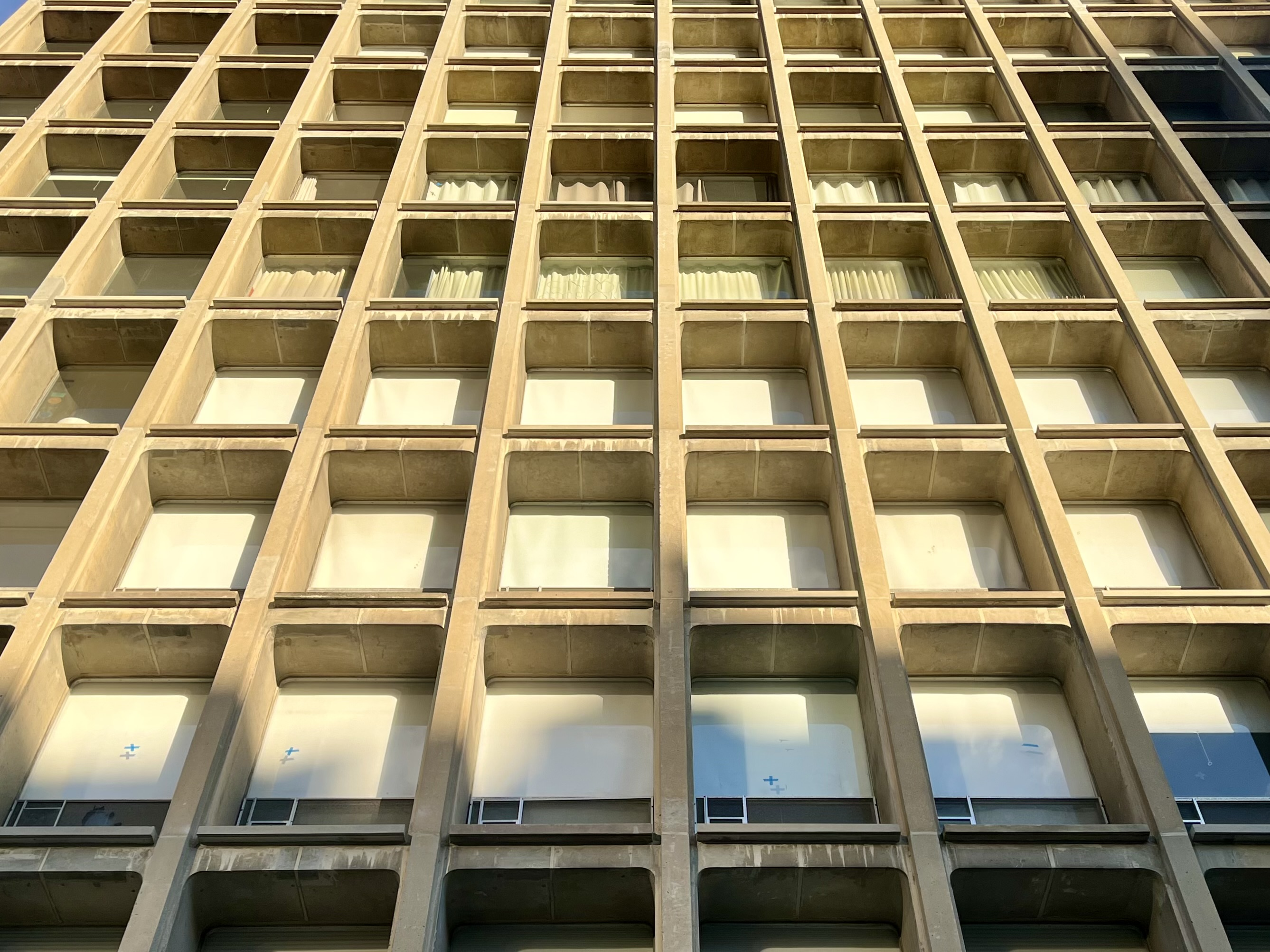
The buildings contain reinforced concrete facades.

The main structures in the development are a pair of 20-story buildings. The towers are oriented east–west, parallel to the Manhattan street grid. The buildings are at the same elevation above sea level, though the site slopes downward between the two towers. Both buildings contain reinforced concrete facades, which comprise part of each building's structural frame and function as a Vierendeel truss; the facades were cast on-site, rather than at a factory. To ensure that the quality of the facade was consistent, Pei personally checked each bag of concrete that arrived at the construction site. The poured-in-place facade went over budget, so there was not as much money to complete the surface finishing.

Kips Bay Plaza was the first project to use the window-truss-wall concept developed by Pei and structural engineer August Komendant. The columns on the facade are spaced at regular intervals and decrease in depth above the fifth and tenth floors, since the columns carry smaller loads on the upper stories. At the ground floor, the columns are spaced 17 feet (5.2 m) apart, forming a colonnade around the lobby. Above the ground story, the facade is split into bays measuring 5.67 feet (2 m) wide; each of the ground-floor openings thus corresponds to three bays. Deep girders were used to transfer loads from the narrowly spaced columns on the upper stories to the columns framing the wider openings on the ground floor.

Windows with rounded corners are recessed 14.5 inches (370 mm) within the concrete frame. Pei intended for the rounded corners to strengthen the facade, and the corners also give the impression that each opening is an arch. In contrast to typical glass curtain walls, which Architectural Forum described as "flat and fragile", the recessed windows were also intended to give the building a sturdy appearance. The original plans called for the apartments to have full-height windows; each living room had three such windows. Because the windows are recessed, the facade acts as a sunshade for the apartments inside. The recesses technically counted as balconies and thus qualified for FHA funding, as the FHA counted balconies as half a room when it gave mortgages to developers. Pei did not want to install actual balconies—he called urban balconies "useless dirt collectors"—but the buildings would not have received FHA funds if balconies were not included.

The complex includes two private surface parking lots for residents, one in front of each tower, and a 300-space public parking garage located below the plaza. The underground garage was designed to take advantage of the site's downward slope to conceal its presence; the entrance is located on First Avenue near the intersection of East 33rd Street, which is near the point of lowest elevation on the adjacent city streets.

==== Interior ====
The two residential towers originally contained 1,120 apartments between them; as of 2022, the towers have 1,118 apartments. Because the facade acts as a load-bearing wall, there are fewer columns in Kips Bay Towers compared to similarly sized structures. There were originally 560 apartments in each building, or 28 apartments per floor.

The apartments came in numerous configurations, connected by a long corridor. The interiors were arranged around square modules measuring 5.67 by 5.67 feet (1.7 m × 1.7 m) across. A typical room measured two modules or 11.17 feet (3.4 m) long, and three modules or 16.67 feet (5.1 m) wide, excluding partitions. Pei tried to increase the number of rooms in the buildings to obtain a larger FHA loan, so he placed numerous three-bedroom apartments at either end of each residential tower. The corners of each floor were occupied by these apartments' bedrooms; this contrasted with similar buildings, where the corners were occupied by living rooms. The north tower contains fewer three-bedroom apartments than the south tower, as the larger apartments were rented more slowly than smaller units. The apartments were slightly longer and narrower than those found in typical apartment buildings.

There are 16-foot-high doors within the apartments, which were intended to give the appearance that the apartments had high ceilings. Each apartment also had air conditioning and built-in kitchen appliances. Pei had designed small air-conditioning units underneath each window, but these were replaced by bulkier air conditioners midway through the development process. Some living rooms had two air conditioning units.

=== Shopping center ===
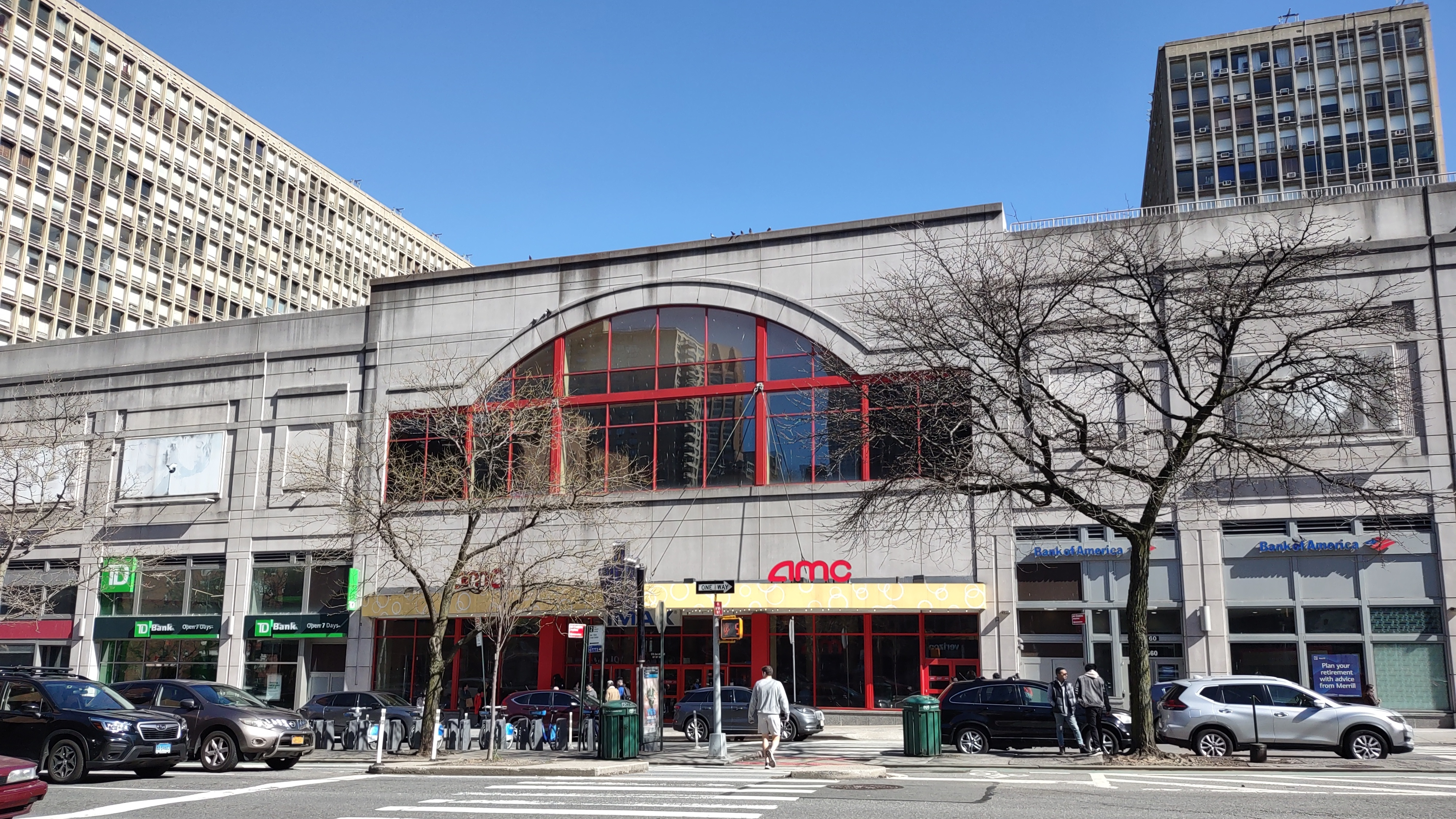
A new shopping center, Kips Bay Plaza, opened in 1999 and includes a 15-screen multiplex.

As built, there was a shopping center along Second Avenue which was planned to house a bank, cinema, and supermarket. The shopping center covered 34,000 square feet (3,200 m^{2}) or 35,000 square feet (3,300 m^{2}) and had 12 stores; the original movie theater had 550 seats. When the original movie theater was in operation, it showed first runs of films. The complex that replaced it, Kips Bay Plaza, opened in 1999 and included a 15-screen multiplex with a total capacity of 3,000 seats. One of the multiplex's screens is 67 feet (20 m) wide and has a capacity of 675 people.

== Impact ==
=== Reception ===
Robert A. M. Stern and the co-authors of his 1995 book New York 1960 described the Kips Bay Towers as "a deliberate departure from the prevailing neighborhood fabric of brownstones and tenements", although they wrote that the buildings' facades "reinforced" the Manhattan street grid. The design of the windows led one critic to compare the facades to "a honeycomb standing upright". Pei himself expressed pride for the tower's design in a 1983 interview with The New York Times. Herbert Muschamp wrote in 1997 that the building complex "was the most successful demonstration of modern urbanism in New York" until the NYU dormitory was completed in 1986. Muschamp further described the building as a "major work of the postwar decades" in New York City, along with University Village and the Chatham Towers.

In 1996, Stern included two housing complexes designed by Pei—Kips Bay Plaza and University Village—in a list of 35 modern projects he considered to be candidates for designation as landmarks by the New York City Landmarks Preservation Commission. A letter written by the National Trust for Historic Preservation in support the designation of University Village as a New York City landmark noted that Kips Bay Plaza "has already lost much of its integrity due to an unsympathetic and out-of-scale shopping center that overwhelms the site", referring to the new retail complex on Second Avenue that had opened in 1999. The same year, a writer for The New York Times described the Kips Bay Towers complex as "form[ing] a community unto itself". The writer John Hill described the Kips Bay Towers in 2011 as "one of New York City's first examples of Brutalism", while the historian Hilary Ballon regarded Pei as having "brought reinforced concrete construction to a new level of refinement" in Kips Bay Plaza's construction.

=== Awards and honors ===
Kips Bay Plaza received both the Honor Award for Residential Design from FHA and the Honor Award for Urban Renewal Design from the Urban Renewal Administration in 1964. The following year, the project was recognized with the Albert S. Bard Award. In a 1977 Times retrospective, Paul Goldberger wrote that Kips Bay Plaza and other winners of the award "now seem more dated than many of their counterparts".

=== Design influence ===
The use of cast-in-place concrete facades at Kips Bay Plaza influenced I. M. Pei & Associates' designs of the Society Hill Towers in Philadelphia (1964) and the Silver Towers in Manhattan (1967). Edward L. Friedman, who led the firm's research in concrete technology, referred to Kips Bay Plaza as a "prototype" and Society Hill as a "refinement" in an October 1960 article in Progressive Architecture that described the search for better ways of handling cast-in-place concrete.

According to the writer Yasmin Sabina Khan, the design of Kips Bay Plaza, along with the University Apartments in Chicago, may have influenced the structural engineer Fazlur Rahman Khan in his development of the concept of the framed tube structure.
