= Roosevelt Field =

Roosevelt Field may refer to:

- Roosevelt Field (airport), a former airport in Uniondale, New York
- Roosevelt Field (shopping mall), a shopping mall at the site of the former airport
- Roosevelt Field Mall Bus Terminal, a bus terminal serving the shopping mall
