= Women Creating Change =

Organization in New York City

Women's City Club of New York
- Abbreviation: WCC
- Formation: 1915; 111 years ago
- Type: Non-Profit
- Purpose: Civic advocacy, Good governance
- Headquarters: 110 W. 40th Street, Suite 1002, New York, NY 10018
- Region served: New York metropolitan area (United States)
- Chief Executive Officer: Sharon Sewell-Fairman
- Website: WCCNY.org

Women Creating Change (WCC), formerly known as the Women's City Club of New York, is an American nonprofit, nonpartisan advocacy organization based in New York City. Founded in 1915, it focuses on advancing gender and racial equity, with a particular emphasis on supporting women of color, low-income women, and gender-expansive individuals.

WCC works on issues including economic opportunity, education, healthcare, reproductive justice, environmental justice, and public safety. The organization engages in policy advocacy and coalition building in partnership with community groups and policymakers in New York City.

The organization adopted its current name, Women Creating Change, in 2019

== History ==
Women Creating Change was founded in 1915 as the Women's City Club of New York, during World War I, by a group of civic activists who sought to address political and municipal issues facing New York City. The club's founding purpose was "to consider various political problems [...] and to offer practical methods by which women may initiate, support, or oppose municipal movements." In September 1915, the club had more than 1,500 members. The founders were suffragettes and from its earliest years, the organization engaged with issues including labor conditions for women in sweatshops, tenement housing reform, and equal opportunity in public life, especially those relating to women and children. The City Club of New York was only open to men at the time.

Founders had a great purpose in mind: "to consider various political problems [...] and to offer practical methods by which women may initiate, support, or oppose municipal movements." WCC held its first officer elections on January 31, 1916. By 1917, there were 1,800 members, and in 1919, 3,100 members. Early on, WCC met on the 18th floor of the Vanderbilt Hotel, where members discussed topics of interest to the woman's club movement. In 1918, the organization moved to an address on Park Avenue. Mary Garrett Hay was nominated for president of WCC in 1918 and helped organize it to become more civically effective. In 1924, Eleanor Roosevelt joined WCC and was elected to its board of directors.

Members wasted no time in tackling complex problems. WCC was organized into special committees which included those on education, welfare, children, the justice system and health issues. During World War I, WCC created a special war committee where they raised money for the war effort. WCC raised $5,000 for war aid.

WCC successfully lobbied Columbia University to admit women to its law school in 1917. In the 1930s, members campaigned for a citywide Department of Sanitation. In 1935, they were involved with charter revision of the county government. WCC was also involved in discussing worker's issues, in the late 1930s, such as minimum wage and eight-hour days for domestic workers. WCC educated the public in order to allow women to serve on juries in the mid-1940s.

Timeline

1915–1919

WCC is founded in 1915. On August 3, The New York Tribune reported that a group of seven "public spirited women formed the initiatory committee, which has invited one hundred representative New York women to compose the organizing committee" of WCC. That same year, WCC incorporates, forms an Organization Committee of 100, and holds its first official meeting on January 31, 1916.

- Members distribute sandwiches to 10,000 striking garment workers
- WCC leads efforts to support women's admission to Columbia Law School
- WCC organizes, finances and operates a War Service Committee, Le Bien-Être du Blessé (Welfare of the Wounded), to deliver food to thousands of wounded soldiers in France
- WCC focuses on suffrage, and Carrie Chapman Catt, WCC member and President of the National American Woman Suffrage Association, plays an instrumental role in the passage of the Woman Suffrage Amendment to the New York State Constitution, granting women the right to vote in the State
- WCC opens the nation's first maternity center less than a year after Margaret Sanger addresses the organization, the birthing center becomes a model in public health circles and grows to become the Maternity Center Association
- WCC charter member Frances Perkins (a future U.S. Secretary of Labor from 1933 to 1945) outlines a plan for WCC's work in civic education
- In 1918, WCC publishes "Our Hopes Justified", highlighting the results of the maternity clinic's pre-natal work and exposes the use of unqualified "nurses" during an influenza epidemic
- In 1919, WCC publishes "School Services for Exceptional or Handicapped Children" and "That ‘Feminized Schools' Bugaboo", which criticizes the "lack of scientific education for girls… overcrowded classes, and too few women on local school boards."

1920s

- WCC issues reports on the re-organization of New York State government and on the poor working conditions and low wages of tenement manufacturing
- WCC issues a guide to all candidates in the City, State, and Federal elections and WCC members vote in the first Presidential election since the passage of the 19th Amendment
- WCC opposes motion picture censorship, and succeeds in abolishing sex discrimination in State civil service
- In 1922, WCC petitions in support of a constitutional amendment to give Congress the power to limit and prohibit labor of children under 16 years old
- In 1923, Eleanor Roosevelt joins WCC and later chairs its "City Planning" unit, and later that year Margaret Woodrow Wilson joins WCC
- In 1924, WCC drafts legislation and successfully campaigns for passage of the first New York State child labor laws, and launches a campaign for a 48-hour work week for women as "a shorter day means better motherhood and stronger women"
- Eleanor Roosevelt becomes WCC's first vice president
- In 1927, WCC's report "The School Lunch Program" results in the replacement of concessionaires by the Department of Homemaking
- In 1929, a WCC study, "Child and Youthful Marriages in New York County", fuels its advocacy campaign to prohibit child marriage

1930s

- In 1931, WCC members lobby the State Legislature to update the charter for New York City
- Members support raising the age that children can leave school to 15 years old
- In 1932, WCC publishes "Comfort Stations in New York City: Today and Tomorrow", recommending improvements in bathroom facilities
- In 1933, WCC's advocacy leads to the establishment of the Court of Domestic Relations to handle cases of children up to 16 years old
- WCC employs a template similar to the Frances Perkins-inspired civic education program for other programs such as "Know Your Courts" and "Know Your Schools"
- In 1935, WCC urges the Works Progress Administration to give women the same consideration as men in appointment of work
- WCC holds a public program, "Difficulties of Managing Low-Rent Housing Projects", which called for more women in actual management of projects
- WCC publishes "Housing for the Family", the first comprehensive report on the City's need for better public housing
- In 1937, WCC publishes "Women on Jury Duty", advocating for equal participation of sexes
- In 1938, WCC publishes "Achieving Better Schools"

1940s

- WCC publishes "Should Prostitution Receive Legal or Social Treatment?"
- Creates a "Handbook on Civil Liberties" compiling relevant statutes, regulations, and court decisions
- In 1941, WCC addresses extending State aid for kindergartens to give women time for defense activities and aid for schools to teach principles of democracy
- In 1942, WCC conducts a study of the custodial system in schools, emphasizing the use of schools as community centers
- In 1944, WCC supports a bill mandating equal pay for equal work, criticizes an increase in employment of minors in industry, and protests a bill to abolish the New York State Department of Labor's Women's Division and Division of Minimum Wage
- In 1946, WCC publishes "New York City's 5-Cent Fare" focused on its goals for soundly planned and adequately financed systems of mass transit
- In 1947, WCC publishes "A Survey of Counseling and Guidance Services in Academic High Schools" and calls for an increase in counseling/guidance services and a class size of 25
- In 1948, WCC endorses a bill to outlaw discrimination in educational institutions on the basis of color, creed, and race
- WCC issues "Better Housing for the Family", exposing how public housing developments have inadequate facilities and are too far from low-cost shopping, clinics and public transit
- In 1949, WCC recommends a State constitutional amendment to permit the City to borrow $500 million for construction of a Second Avenue subway

1950s

- WCC studies 108 play streets in Manhattan about their cleanliness
- WCC urges City hospitals to give special treatment to juvenile drug addicts
- WCC protests allegations by Joseph McCarthy's Senate subcommittee against a WCC board member
- WCC holds a public program on businesses considering women "old" at age 35
- In 1952, WCC endorses the principles of new zoning plan to diminish congestion in Manhattan and to "end need for children to seek play space in NYC's dangerous streets"
- In March 1954, WCC issues "Tenant Relocation at West Park", a study of living conditions and relocation tactics used in Manhattantown.
- In 1954, WCC issues "Institutions for Delinquent Youth", a study of 23 correctional institutions for 16- to 21-year-olds, and recommends the establishment of a youth center for delinquents awaiting trial
- In 1955, WCC publishes "Know Your Courts", which outlines the functions of the various types of courts and recommends reforms (many of which are incorporated into the Tweed Commission report the next year)
- WCC testifies before the New York City Council in support of a City multiple dwelling code "to force the city to adopt a housing program that would provide for both low- and middle-income families"
- In 1958, WCC publishes "Before It's Too Late", focusing on the New York City Board of Education's methods for aiding "troubled children and children in trouble", which leads to the creation of the Division of Child Welfare
- WCC urges the Hospital Commissioner to make contraceptive advice available to patients

1960s

- WCC calls for separate work camps for juvenile delinquents 16 to 21 years old and 21 to 25 years old
- In 1961, WCC issues proposals for a stronger Mayor and City Council to be included in the City Charter, and works with other civic groups to abolish the Board of Estimate
- In 1963, WCC sets up an Ad Hoc Committee on Integration in New York City amid the country's civil rights movement
- WCC participates in a March for Freedom and Jobs in Washington, D.C.
- In 1964, WCC supports a Brooklyn Bridge urban renewal plan, and criticizes the quantity of low-income housing and the City's plan to expand subway system
- In 1966, WCC issues "How Shall We Raise the Money? Proposals for Financing City Government"and "Performance and Promise: New York City's Local School Boards Revisited"
- In 1967, WCC advocates for merging City colleges into the City University of New York and recommends the decentralization of school boards
- WCC holds program "Proposals for a New Constitution: Recommendations to the New York State Constitutional Convention of 1967"
- In 1969, WCC supports a bill for an all-out repeal of the State's Abortion Law

1970s

- WCC's Housing Committee urges the City Planning Commission to resist requests from developers and property owners to change zoning to allow for more and larger buildings in already crowded areas of the City
- In 1971, WCC declares the Vietnam War is "detrimental to the welfare of our city" and that "the tensions and conflicts created by the war, the inflation aggravated by the war, and the billions of dollars absorbed by the war are preventing this city…from the vast and numerous problems which beset [it]"
- WCC criticizes the New York State legislature for drawing district lines without input from voters
- In 1973, WCC establishes a Status of Women Committee that meets monthly to examine issues of discrimination against women
- WCC issues "Goals for the City: Standards for New York – Today and Tomorrow"… and hosts a conference on New York City's fiscal crisis
- In 1975, Mayor Abe Beame establishes a 30-member Commission on the Status of Women following WCC's advocacy efforts and appoints WCC President Edythe First as its first Chairperson
- WCC urges the immediate completion of Second Avenue subway
- WCC publishes "The Privileged Many: A Study of the City University's Open Admissions Policy, 1970-1975"
- In 1977, WCC issues "A Good Start – A Good School: Early Reading Experiences in New York City Public Schools" and "With Love and Affection: A Study of Building Abandonment"
- In 1978, WCC organizes a Coalition for Improved Nursing Home Care
- In 1979, WCC addresses truancy with the release "It's 10 a.m. – Do You Know Where Your Children Are?"
- WCC's Executive Committee votes to allow "male persons be admitted to membership in the Women's City Club if they apply and are sponsored by a member of the Club" and then admits several male members

1980s

- WCC issues "Deadlines in New York City Budget Process" and "The Critical Years: Junior High School Title I Reading: Programs in Two NYC Public Schools"
- In 1982, nearly 50 WCC members participate in the largest rally for nuclear disarmament yet held in the United States
- In 1983, WCC publishes "Giving Dropouts a Second Chance: A Survey of 6 Outreach Centers Established by the New York City Board of Education"
- In 1985, WCC issues "The Key to Literacy: Unlocking Library Doors", which examines libraries in the City's public elementary schools
- In 1988, WCC forms the Coalition for Homeless Women, which begins hosting an annual Conference on Homeless Women
- WCC organizes and sponsors the Martha Fraenkel Symposium on the impact of AIDS on children and families

1990s

- WCC publishes "AIDS: Its Impact on Children and their Families" and issues a "Directory of Housing Resources for Homeless Women", the city's first definitive service guide and list of shelters
- In 1992, WCC publishes "Lessons to Be Learned: AIDS Education in New York City High Schools and Community-Based Organizations, 1989-91", which criticizes the lack of a comprehensive HIV/AIDS education program in New York City's public high schools
- WCC co-hosts a conference on sexual harassment at Hunter College with Professor Anita Hill as the keynote speaker
- WCC publishes "Beyond Small Facilities and Good Intentions: Improving NYC's Women Shelter System" and a second edition of "Directory of Housing Resources for Homeless Women" and hosts a program, "Improving the NYC Women's Shelter System"
- In 1995, WCC releases a 28-minute video, "Meeting the Challenge: Promoting HIV/AIDS Awareness Among Young People and Adolescents", featuring public health experts and young actors, and distributes it the public high schools... and publishes "An Emergency That Won't Disappear," a follow-up study of City shelters for homeless single women
- In 1996, WCC hosts a conference, "New York City in the 21st Century: New Solutions, New Partnerships"
- In 1997, WCC issues a publication and hosts a conference, "Bangladesh? No, the Bronx! The Challenge of Microenterprise: a New York City Perspective"
- In 1988, WCC advocates for School Board elections by registered voters and parents of children attending schools regardless of citizenship, and opposes a New York City Charter revision
- In 1999, WCC cosigns an advertisement in The New York Times to protest police brutality and call for improved relations between the police and the communities they serve
- WCC publishes "Homeless Women, New York's Permanent Emergency: Report on NYC's Shelters for Single, Homeless Women"

2000s

- WCC begins its 85th anniversary year with a summit featuring "Visions for the Future of New York City"
- WCC holds an "Immigrants in New York City" conference at New York University and "Urban Summit: Leadership for a Civic Agenda"
- WCC supports discretionary work release for women convicted of striking back at their abusers and supports allowing victims of sexual assault, while on the job, to sue in court if their employer's negligence led to the assault
- WCC testifies in support of renewing rent regulation laws, and in support of increased permanent housing options for the homeless
- In 2002, WCC supports a moratorium on executions in New York State and the Women's Health and Wellness Act, which would provide comprehensive health care to women in New York State
- In 2004, WCC participates in the March for Women's Lives in Washington, D.C.
- In 2005, WCC hosts a conference, "Revitalizing Citizen Participation for the 21st Century"
- WCC publishes an updated version of "Snapshot of NYC Charter Schools"
- In 2006, WCC supports a measure preventing health insurance companies from limiting behavioral health coverage for certain mental illnesses; improved health care access; and an exception to the five-year statute of limitations in rape cases
- WCC urges the United States to support the protection of rights of women and girls in Afghanistan
- In 2007, WCC urges Congress to expand Earned Income Tax Credit to working poor families and extend Child Tax Credit to childless workers, and to eliminate rule requiring families seeking subsidized child care to participate in child support enforcement efforts
- In 2008, WCC urges Federal officials to rescind a directive that would drastically reduce the number of children eligible for State Children's Health Insurance Program (SCHIP), and urges Congress to increase the welfare grant
- In 2009, WCC urges the New York City Council to approve resolutions calling for passage of the New York Fair Pay Act and urges Congress to pass the Lilly Ledbetter Fair Pay Act
- WCC joins the One New York Coalition urging New York City and State to protect funding for safety net services and address the immediate need for more revenues
- WCC urges Mayor Michael Bloomberg to reverse his decision refusing $155 million in federal monies that would enable New York City to extend food stamp benefits to able-bodied adults without dependents
- WCC testifies on multiple election reforms

2010s

- WCC releases a report analyzing Mayor Bloomberg's "Greener, Greater Buildings" plan, recommends improvements, and urges the City Council to pass the legislation after WCC-supported revisions were incorporated into the plan
- WCC opposes drilling activity that endangers New York City's water supply and urges the City to make all take-out containers recyclable and to ban Styrofoam in food service
- WCC testifies before the New York City Charter Revision Commission, recommending issues for study and before the New York City Board of Elections on the proposed optical scan voting systems that would replace the City's lever voting machines
- In 2011, WCC's Task Force on Physical Education focuses on the issue of improving physical fitness for students in New York City's public schools and campaigns to promote sex education in New York City
- In 2012, WCC issues the first Guide to Services and Resources, a directory of service organizations aimed at New Yorkers who face daily challenges to obtaining the quality of life they deserve
- In 2013, WCC supports a measure to ban polystyrene foam as disposable food containers
- In 2014, WCC examines how schools are providing sex education to students and writes to Congress
- In 2015, WCC creates a Centennial Medal for Women in Leadership to honor women who are making significant contributions to shaping policy that improves the quality of life for all New Yorkers
- In 2016, WCC launches its centennial with a Founders' Day celebration at the New York Academy of Medicine, and commemorates its centennial through a variety of programs, panel discussions, and a conference, "From Inequality to Equality: Policies and Programs that Work"
- WCC testifies before a New York City Council Committee hearing on a measure prohibiting employers from inquiring about or relying on a prospective employee's salary history
- In 2017, WCC participates in:
  - the massive Women's March on New York City in support of equality and civil rights and to advocate for economic, gender, and racial justice for all
  - the Campaign for New York Health rally and lobby day in Albany in support of a universal single-payer health care measure
  - the campaign to raise the age to 18 years old for young offenders to be charged as adults
- WCC celebrates the announcement by the City of a Universal Physical Education Initiative to strengthen physical education in public schools
- In 2018, WCC participates in the second annual Women's March on New York City
- WCC joins elected officials and civic leaders and testifies at a Joint New York City Council Committee Hearing on a package of reforms addressing sexual harassment
- In 2019, WCC officially launches its new name, vision, and mission. Women's City Club of New York is now Women Creating Change.
- In 2019, WCC takes a look into other ways WCC can live its values not just programmatically, but also through its financial partnerships. Specifically, WCC wants to ensure that its monies were managed by companies that shared its values and were committed to expanding and promoting WCC’s mission and were being invested in ways that were aligned with WCC’s programmatic and policy goals.

2020s

- In January 2020, WCC participates in the fourth annual Women's March on New York City.
- WCC launches "Table Talk" a speaker series involving guests like Director of NYC Census 2020 Office, Julie Menin and Dr. Sarah Sayeed, Chair of the NYC Civic Engagement Commission exploring topics such as voting rights, the 2020 Census, women's activism and the COVID-19 pandemic's impact on women.
- In February 2020, WCC selects Boston-based investment firm Trillium Asset Management to manage WCC’s portfolio. Trillium has been an industry leader and pioneer in responsible investing and shareholder advocacy for decades. Their focus on Environmental, Social, and Governance (ESG) investing makes them the ideal partner for WCC as they believe that change can occur when financial and programmatic work hand-in-hand. Since then, Trillium has become a true partner for WCC — not just in financial growth, but also to help amplify and strengthen WCC’s work in civic engagement.
- In March 2020, WCC is excited to sign onto the Our City, Our Vote Coalition. OCOV comprises dozens of nonprofits in New York and aims to extend voting rights to green card holders and those authorized to work in the United States. The coalition is advocating for them to vote in elections for city-level offices, as long as they have been a resident of New York City for at least 30 days and are otherwise qualified to register and vote under New York State election law. WCC was an active participant in the efforts to pass the 19th amendment more than 100 years ago, and is honored to again be fighting for the right to vote for more people!
- WCC hosts its first-ever Civic Matters Community Workshop in October 2020. This is the launch of a series of events for women from underrepresented backgrounds to learn about actions they can take to become civically engaged. WCC’s Civic Matters Workshops are safe spaces where women can gather to learn, network, and organize to create change in their communities. Workshops are designed for people who have historically faced barriers to civic participation.
- In February 2021, WCC publishes a values statement. Read it here.
- In June 2021, WCC releases a groundbreaking report, A Blueprint for Women’s Civic Engagement in New York City: Toward a More Just and Equitable Democracy. The Blueprint examines the landscape of women’s civic engagement in New York City–focusing on those who have been systemically excluded from civic processes. The report defines civic engagement; identifies the barriers and drivers of civic participation; and highlights recommendations for nonprofits, government, foundations, and the private sector.
- The OCOV Coalition declares victory when Intro. 1867 is passed by the New York City Council on December 9, 2021, and became law 30 days later on January 8, 2022. With the passage of Intro.1867, NYC will become the largest city for all green card holders and people with work authorization to vote in city elections beginning January 2023.
- The first Workshop Design Team launches in November 2021.
- In June 2021, WCC published A Blueprint for Women's Civic Engagement in New York City: Toward a More Just and Equitable Democracy, a report examining barriers to and drivers of civic participation among women in New York City, with a focus on communities historically excluded from civic processes. The report included recommendations directed at nonprofits, government agencies, foundations, and the private sector.
- The OCOV Coalition declares victory when Intro. 1867 is passed by the New York City Council on December 9th, 2021, and became law 30 days later on January 8th, 2022. With the passage of Intro.1867, NYC will become the largest city for all green card holders and people with work authorization to vote in city elections beginning January 2023.
- WCC Partners with Center for New York City Affairs at the New School to release State of New City Women Gender Pay Gap Report in 2023.
- In 2024, WCC releases the Unequal Ground Report with the Center for New York City Affairs at the New School, works with New York Liberty to inspire civic action and advance reproductive justice, and partners with University Settlement on Civic Leadership Training Cohort.
- Over 250 leaders from government, philanthropy, and grassroots groups gathered at Civic Hall on October 14, 2025 for the first State of NYC Women Conference to build a citywide strategy advancing gender equity and civic power.

== Notable members ==
- Mary van Kleeck
- Sara Josephine Baker
- Leona Baumgartner
- Katherine Bement Davis
- Molly Dewson
- Mary Dreier
- Genevieve B. Earle
- Mary Garrett Hay (served as president)
- Virginia Gildersleeve
- Helen Hayes
- Marie Jenney Howe
- Edith Somborn Isaacs
- Florence Kelley
- Dorothy Kenyon
- Ruth Watson Lubic
- Alice Duer Miller
- Belle Moskowitz
- Frances Perkins
- Cornelia Bryce Pinchot
- Helen Rogers Reid
- Eleanor Roosevelt
- Mary Harriman Rumsey
- Pauline Sabin
- Dorothy Schiff
- Mary Kingsbury Simkhovitch
- Caroline Simon
- Ida Tarbell
- Lillian Wald
- Frieda Schiff Warburg

== See also ==
- City Club of New York
