= Mary Garrett Hay =

American suffragist and organizer (1857–1928)

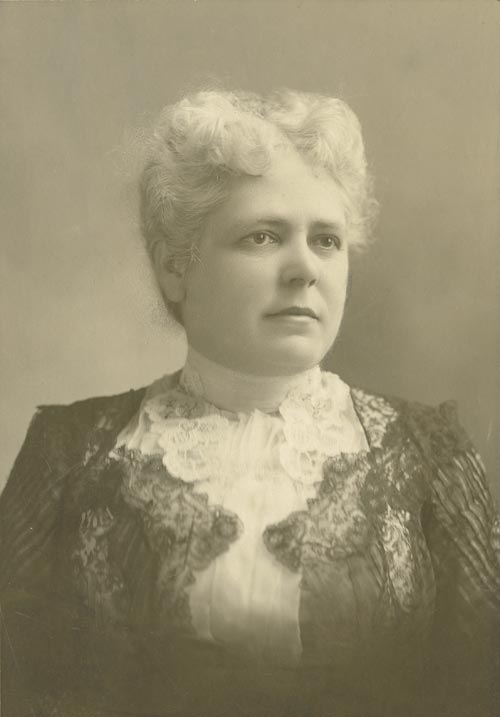
- Born: August 20, 1857; Charlestown, Indiana, US
- Died: August 29, 1928 (aged 71); Pelham, New York, US
- Occupations: Suffragist; Community organizer
- Partner: Carrie Chapman Catt

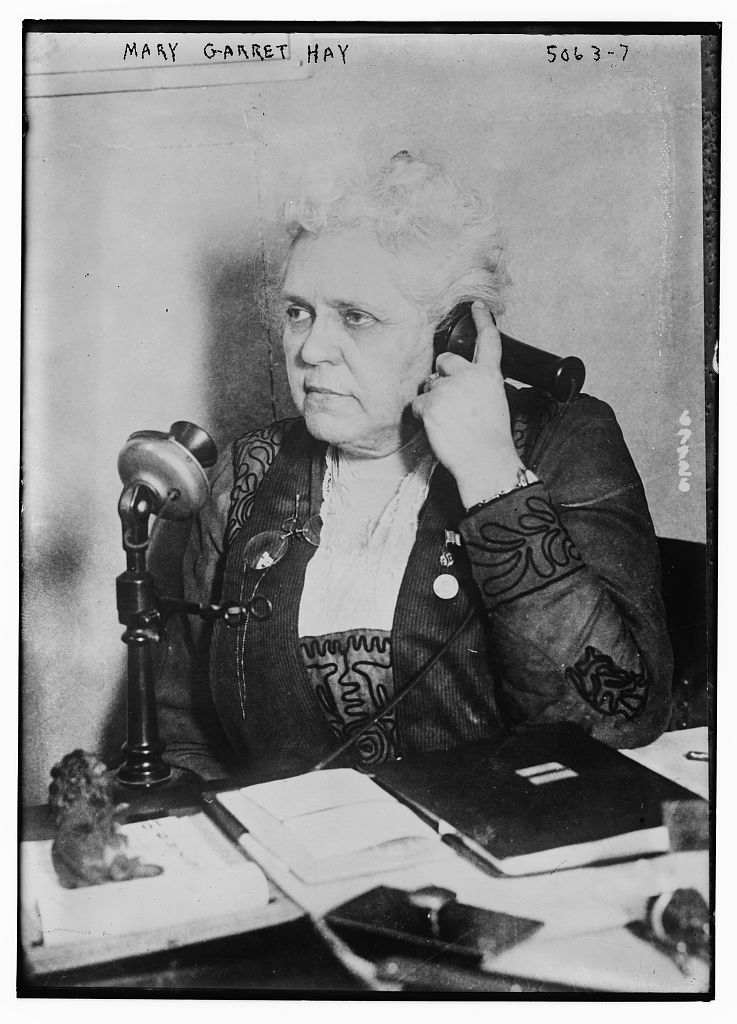
Mary Garrett Hay on the telephone in 1918

Mary Garrett Hay (August 20, 1857 – August 29, 1928) was an American suffragist and community organizer. She served as president of the Women's City Club of New York, the Woman Suffrage Party and the New York Equal Suffrage League. Hay was known for creating woman's suffrage groups across the country. She was also close to the notable suffragist, Carrie Chapman Catt, with one contemporary, Rachel Foster Avery, stating that Hay "really loves" Catt.

== Early life ==
Hay was born in Charlestown, Indiana, on August 20, 1857. She was the eldest of five children of Andrew Jennings Hay, a physician, and Rebecca H. Hay (née Garrett). Her mother died when she was young and she would travel with her father, who was an important Republican, when he visited patients or had political work. She was a devout Presbyterian. Hay attended the Western Female Seminary in Oxford, Ohio, between 1873 and 1874, where she studied to become a pharmacist and later worked for her father's pharmacy.

== Activism ==
Hay moved home after graduation, at a time when the Women's Crusade was becoming popular in the Midwest. She became involved in the temperance movement, particularly in the Woman's Christian Temperance Union (WCTU). She served as the local secretary-treasurer before becoming the treasurer for the state chapter, a position that she held for seven years. She ran a department in the national organization by 1885. As the WCTU began to focus on a wider range of issues, including women's suffrage, Hay was persuaded by Zerelda Gray Wallace to join a suffrage group. She worked her way up from the local chapter to the state office.

She met Carrie Chapman Catt, who was organizing suffrage campaigns across the country, possibly while the pair were attending a National American Woman Suffrage Association (NAWSA) convention. In the summer of 1895, Hay and Catt moved in together for a while. When Catt's husband, George, died in 1905, Hay moved in with Catt permanently and took over the household responsibilities.

In 1896, when California was creating its state constitution, Hay, along with women she organized, worked to have women's suffrage be included, though the referendum for women to vote was narrowly defeated. Her work in California gave her valuable experience in organizing. Hay created suffrage groups across the country. In November 1895 she and the Rev. Henrietta G. Moore organized the state convention that founded the West Virginia Equal Suffrage Association. In 1899, she and Catt traveled through 20 different states, made numerous speeches and attended 15 conventions. At conventions, like one in Topeka in 1918, Hay advocated creating citizenship and civics classes for women. Hay served as the president of the New York Equal Suffrage League from 1910 to 1918. In 1912, she was the president of the group, The Daughters of Indiana. She served as president of the Woman Suffrage Party (WSP) in 1915. She also encouraged women to find employment by creating jobs as part of the Committee for Extending Business Opportunities to Women, founding in 1915. During her time in WSP, she organized the enrollment of thousands of women to vote in the state of New York. In 1919, she was also the president of the Women's City Club of New York (WCC). Hay was nominated to the WCC in order to bring a strong leadership role to the civic organization. Hay was also the president of the New York City League of Women Voters between 1918 and 1923.

=== Republican politics ===
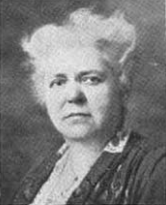
Mary Garrett Hay, 1921

Hay became one of the first women in the Eastern United States to join a political party when she became a Republican. She served as chair of the Republican Women's National Executive Committee in 1919 and 1920. Hay ensured that women's suffrage remained an important plank in the Republican Party of the time. She encouraged other women to join the party. In 1920, Hay and Catt cast ballots for the first time for president, together.

During the 1910s, Hay was considered as a potential presidential candidate.

== Later life and legacy ==
Hay died in Pelham at home of a heart attack. She was found by Catt inside of their home. Catt created a monument to Hay where she was buried in Woodlawn Cemetery. After Catt died in 1947, she was buried next to Hay. Their headstone reads, "Here lie two, united in friendship for 38 years through constant service to a great cause".

A historic marker honoring Hay was unveiled in the town square in Charlestown on November 15, 2021.

== In popular culture ==
Winter Wheat, a musical by Cathy Bush about the ratification of the Nineteenth Amendment to the United States Constitution in Tennessee, premiered at the Barter Theatre in 2016. The original version of the play had a limited run at the Barter in 2014. Hay and Carrie Chapman Catt are characters in the play. The show also features anti-suffragist Josephine Anderson Pearson and Tennessee state representative Harry T. Burn, who cast the deciding vote for ratification in Tennessee.

The 2022 musical Suffs, depicting several historical suffragists in the final years before the passing of the Nineteenth Amendment, features Hay as a supporting character. The role was originated by Jaygee Macapugay Off-Broadway and in the 2024 Broadway production. The musical explicitly depicts her and Catt as being in a romantic relationship.
