= S. J. Kessler and Sons =

American architectural firm

S.J. Kessler and Sons was an American architectural firm based in New York City, and active through at least 1980.

== History ==
Founded in early 20th century by architect and engineer Samuel J. Kessler, the namesake firm quickly grew to become one of the premier architectural firms in New York City during the 1950s. During this period of time, the firm, initially headed by Sam Kessler and then his sons Matthew J. Kessler, Melvin E. Kessler and grandson Stuart thereafter, was responsible for the design and construction of numerous buildings in the New York City area, later expanding their reach to northeastern Pennsylvania, including the cities of Allentown, Bethlehem, and Hershey. They also designed buildings in Boston, Massachusetts, and St. Louis, Missouri. Its later buildings include the 12-story apartment complex the A.K. Houses in East Harlem, on Lexington Avenue between East 127th and East 128th Streets, built in 1980.

Following an investigation by the Senate Committee on Banking and Currency in late 1954, during the development of Manhattantown (later called Park West Village) on Manhattan's Upper West Side, New York City mayor Robert Wagner placed a five-year moratorium on "Title I", urban renewal projects involving Manhattantown's initial private participants. This included Melvin E. Kessler, who had taken an equity position in the development but whose fees had been misrepresented in the sponsors' public filings.

== Buildings ==
Among the buildings constructed by S.J. Kessler & Sons in New York City are Lincoln Towers, West Park Village, Lenox Terrace in Harlem, Washington Square Village, Park West Village (with Skidmore, Owings & Merrill, and One Sherman Square Apartments.

Outside New York, the firm also designed One Hershey Plaza.
