= Central Park Place =

Residential skyscraper in Manhattan, New York

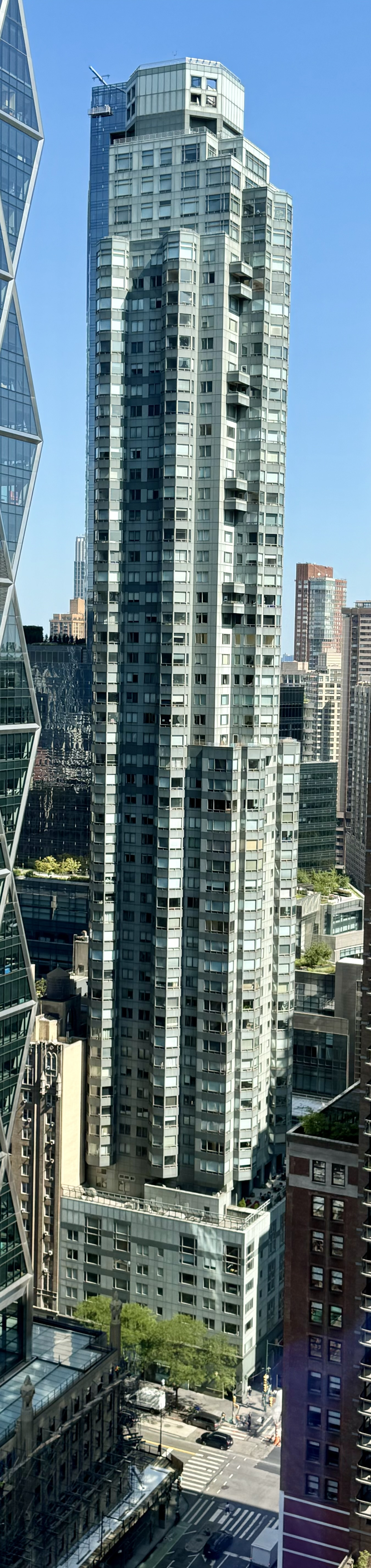
- Interactive map of the Central Park Place area

General information
- Type: Residential
- Location: 301 West 57th Street, Manhattan, New York
- Coordinates: 40°46′02″N 73°58′59″W
- Construction started: December 1985
- Completed: 1988

Height
- Roof: 628 ft (191 m)
- Top floor: 585 ft (178 m)

Technical details
- Floor count: 56

Design and construction
- Architect: Davis Brody Bond
- Developer: William Zeckendorf Jr.
- Main contractor: HRH Construction

Central Park Place is a residential condominium building in the Hell's Kitchen and Midtown Manhattan neighborhoods of New York City. The building is at 301 West 57th Street, at the northwest corner with Eighth Avenue. Davis Brody Bond designed Central Park Place, which is 628 feet (191 m) tall with 56 stories. Central Park Place's facade is made of gray-green glass and aluminum panels, a color scheme intended to associate the building with the nearby Central Park.

Central Park Place was developed by William Zeckendorf Jr., who started acquiring land for the building in 1982. Initially, the tower was planned as a mixed-use development with office space and 310 apartments. After construction costs increased, Zeckendorf changed the plans to modify the number of apartments in the development, and split off the office component into another project. There were several controversies during the tower's construction, including an incident in which a pedestrian was killed by debris. Central Park Place was completed in 1988, and within two years, was almost fully occupied.

== Site ==
Central Park Place is on the border of the Hell's Kitchen and Midtown Manhattan neighborhoods of New York City, one block south of Columbus Circle and the southern border of Central Park. It is bounded by Eighth Avenue to the east and 57th Street to the south. The building faces 4 Columbus Circle and Deutsche Bank Center (formerly Time Warner Center) to the north, 2 Columbus Circle to the northeast, 3 Columbus Circle to the east, and the Hearst Tower to the south. The site is a nearly square lot covering 10,042 square feet (932.9 m^{2}), and measuring 100 by 100 feet (30.48 by 30.48 m). Entrances to the New York City Subway's 59th Street–Columbus Circle station, served by the 1, A, B, C, and D trains, are within the base of the tower.

== Architecture ==
Central Park Place is 628 feet (191 m) tall with 56 stories. It was designed by Davis, Brody & Associates, with Rosenwasser/Grossman Consulting Engineers as structural engineer. The tower was built by HRH Construction. The lowest six stories occupy the whole lot, while the upper stories are smaller.

=== Facade ===
Central Park Place's facade is made of gray-green glass and aluminum panels. The color of the facade is intended to associate the building with the nearby Central Park. Most apartments have bay windows that extend nearly the full height of the floor. The windows measure 16 by 9 feet (4.9 by 2.7 m) and project from the facade, creating three-sided windows. There are several cantilevers from the facade, giving views of Central Park to some of the side apartments. Architecture critic Carter Horsley said of the facade, "The pale green probably looked great in pastel renderings, but in reality, it is a bit weak-looking."

=== Features ===
Central Park Place has 300 condominium apartments, which range from studio apartments to two-bedroom units. When the building opened, the apartments ranged from $200,000 to $4 million. There are four penthouses, the largest of which is a 4,200-square-foot (390 m^{2}) unit on the 53rd floor. The tower contains a swimming pool, a residents' health and fitness club, a party room, a residents' dining room, and four rooms for residents' guests.

Judith Stockman and Associates was hired to design the lobby. The tower's developer William Zeckendorf Jr. wanted the design to relate to Central Park, so Stockman constructed the lobby with wooden wainscoting, marble surfaces, and brass ornamentation. For his projects, Zeckendorf generally only accepted final drawings from architects after his interior design team approved them. For example, at Central Park Place, the bay windows were redesigned after their original dimensions were found to be too small.

== History ==
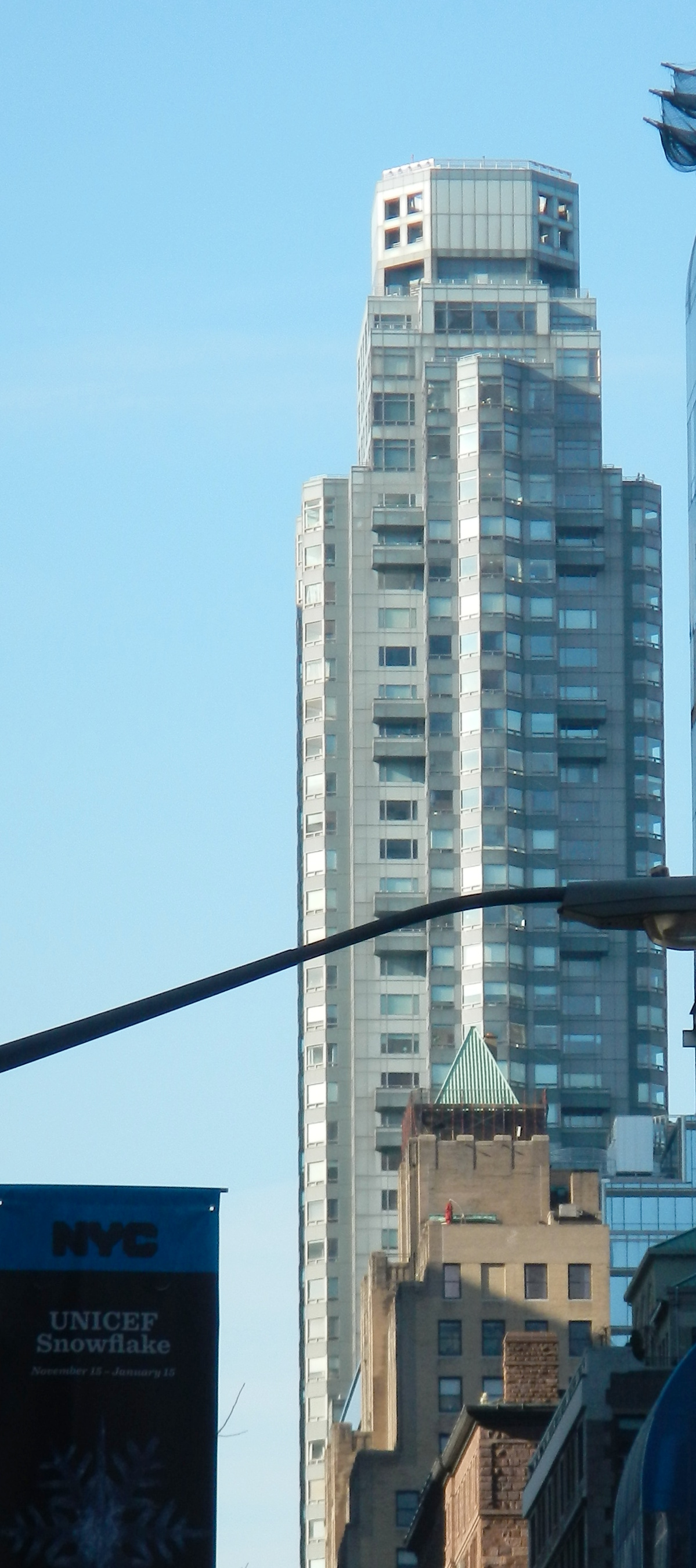
Top of Central Park Place from Sixth Avenue

=== Development ===
Zeckendorf started assembling the site on Eighth Avenue between 57th and 58th Streets in 1982. A joint venture of Zeckendorf Companies, Omni Properties, and K.G. Land planned a $135 million development containing 100,000 square feet (9,300 m^{2}) of office space and 9,000 square feet (840 m^{2}) of ground-floor stores, as well as 310 apartments, composed of studios and one- and two-bedroom units. By 1984, the media reported that Zeckendorf's organization was planning a 70-story tower for the site. The development was one of several projects being planned in the area at the time. For the project, Zeckendorf destroyed two buildings on the southwest corner of Eighth Avenue and 58th Street, including a single room occupancy hotel called the Alpine Hotel, and rebuilt a third structure. Under the original plans, the tower would have occupied a larger site. All of the air rights above the Alpine Hotel would have been transferred to Central Park Place, allowing the tower to be erected with a larger maximum floor area, and thereby allowing a 70-story building.

The project encountered delays after the city government enacted an 18-month moratorium on demolishing single room occupancy residential structures in 1985. Zeckendorf and his partners wanted to commence construction on the residential tower, Central Park Place, as soon as possible. Accordingly, the group paid the city $2.29 million to demolish the Alpine Hotel, a building they already owned. The residential tower and office components were split into separate projects to speed up development of the former project. More two-bedroom apartments were added to the residential tower, and the brick facade of the original design was changed to a glass and aluminum facade. The developers allocated most of the site's development rights to the residential tower, now Central Park Place. The office component at 4 Columbus Circle, immediately to the north of Central Park Place, was completed in 1989 with 104,000 square feet (9,700 m^{2}) of space, becoming one of Manhattan's smallest office buildings.

Work on Central Park Place had started by December 1985, but the project soon encountered controversy. During the next one and a half years, the city government cited builder HRH Construction for sixteen building-code violations, and issued six stop-work orders due to unsafe construction conditions. In June 1987, a piece of lumber was dislodged from one of the higher floors during a wind storm. The lumber hit a pedestrian on Eighth Avenue, who later died. In a December 1987 protest against government policies on homelessness, New York Civil Liberties Union director Norman Siegel said of Central Park Place, "When we build those buildings, we pay a high price because large developments result in the displacement of poor people." Furthermore, recording studio Mediasound filed a lawsuit against Zeckendorf in January 1988, claiming that several clients had been driven away by the construction of Central Park Place.

=== Use ===
Sales at the building started in September 1987. More than 200 units were sold, with one-fifth of these units going to foreign buyers. At the time of the building's completion in 1988, the surrounding neighborhood was still considered desolate. The segment of Eighth Avenue south of 57th Street was considered shabby, but this was changing quickly. Units at Central Park Place attracted several high-value sales; in one week in May 1989, Zeckendorf earned $8 million from selling three apartments, all of which were purchased for over a million dollars.

By mid-1990, ninety-nine percent of the 300 units had been sold. One such unit, on the 27th story, was raided in 1993 when the New York City Police Department conducted its largest-ever heroin seizure there, confiscating $240 million worth of heroin. The narcotics, divided into 562 packets containing one-third of a kilogram (about 12 ounces) of heroin each, were being stored in five black suitcases in the apartment.

Residents of Central Park Place have included Turner Broadcasting System executive Philip I. Kent, as well as celebrities such as Goldie Hawn, Kurt Russell, Gene Hackman, and Al Pacino.
