= William Zeckendorf Jr. =

American real estate developer

- Born: October 31, 1929; New York City, U.S.
- Died: February 12, 2014 (aged 84); Santa Fe, New Mexico, U.S.
- Occupation: Real estate developer
- Spouse(s): Guri Lie (divorced); Nancy King
- Children: with Lie: Arthur Zeckendorf; William Lie Zeckendorf
- Parent(s): Irma Levy Zeckendorf; William Zeckendorf
- Family: Irving Kolodin (stepfather)

William Zeckendorf Jr. (October 31, 1929 – February 12, 2014) was an American real estate developer. Son of William Zeckendorf Sr., he was the second of three generations of one of New York's great real estate dynasties. While keeping a lower profile than his famously flamboyant father, Zeckendorf Jr. was highly successful in his own right. Like his father, he became known for large-scale projects that transformed neighborhoods.

The New York Times called Zeckendorf Jr. Manhattan's "most active real estate developer" in 1986. At the time he was a partner in 20 projects worth well over $1 billion.

== Early years ==
William Zeckendorf Jr. was born on October 31, 1929, in New York City, the son of Irma (née Levy) and William Zeckendorf. Raised in Manhattan, he received his early education at the Collegiate School and graduated from the Lawrenceville School in Lawrenceville, New Jersey, in 1948. He studied for two years at the University of Arizona in Tucson before enlisting in the U.S. Army. He served as an intelligence officer during the Korean War. His stepfather was music critic and music historian Irving Kolodin. He had one sister, Susan Zeckendorf Nicholson.

== Career ==
Following his discharge from the army in 1953, Zeckendorf joined his father's company, Webb & Knapp, working alongside Zeckendorf Sr. on such high-profile developments as Century City in Los Angeles, Place Ville-Marie in Montreal, and L'Enfant Plaza in Washington, D.C. After Webb & Knapp went bankrupt in 1965, Zeckendorf Jr. restructured the company as General Property Corporation. In 1972, he went out on his own, founding Zeckendorf Company and serving as president until he retired in 1992. In the 1980s, the company emerged as one of New York City's most prominent developers of luxury hotels, upscale condominium apartments, office towers, and mixed-use projects.

In the 1970s, Zeckendorf began buying undervalued hotels, renovating them, and then selling them at a profit. For one hotel, Mayfair House, he persuaded Sirio Maccioni to open Le Cirque, which quickly became one of New York's top restaurants, cementing the restaurateur's reputation. Zeckendorf's other hotel renovations of that era include the Hotel McAlpin, the Statler Hilton, and the Delmonico, where he brought in Christie's Auction House, leasing the English firm their first stateside location, and where he and his wife Nancy lived for many years. In the 1980s, Zeckendorf turned from renovations to building major developments from the ground up.

In 1981, Zeckendorf began construction on a 35-story condominium building, The Columbia, at Broadway and West 96th Street in Manhattan, on a site that had been a community garden. This was an unusual location for a residential project, as the area was marginal and most developers at the time hesitated to build more than a few blocks north of Lincoln Center. Initial dissent from the community subsided when the condos went on sale, as most went to middle-class buyers including neighborhood residents, and not, as had been feared, to wealthy people intent on pushing out the locals. The net effect, however, was to upgrade the neighborhood.

Zeckendorf followed the success of The Columbia with the Park Belvedere, hiring the same architect, Frank Williams, to design the first luxury residential high-rise on Columbus Avenue. One of the early "sliver" buildings, rising 35 stories on a narrow, 12,000 square foot site at the corner of West 79th Street, the Park Belvedere made creative use of air rights to increase the allowable height—a strategy that became a Zeckendorf trademark. Hailed as a pioneer in opening up the Broadway corridor to residential development, Zeckendorf went on to build three more West Side condominiums, the Copley, Central Park Place, and the Alexandria.

Moving downtown, in 1987 Zeckendorf completed Zeckendorf Towers, named after his father. A full-block, mixed-use development at the southeast corner of Union Square, it replaced a number of low-rise buildings that had fallen into disrepair. Zeckendorf was credited with helping revitalize the Union Square area, launching an upsurge of development along Park Avenue South and in the nearby Flatiron District.

In 1989, Zeckendorf finished construction of Worldwide Plaza, on Eighth Avenue between West 49th and 50th Street. His largest project in New York, the mixed-use commercial and residential development sits on a four-acre site formerly occupied by the old Madison Square Garden. After leasing space in the 49-story office tower to blue-chip firms Cravath, Swain & Moore and Ogilvy & Mather, the complex was cited as another pioneering move by Zeckendorf, legitimizing Eighth Avenue as a corporate address. Construction of Worldwide Plaza was documented in a Channel 4 / PBS mini-series and a companion book Skyscraper: The Making of a Building by Karl Sabbagh.

Zeckendorf's other major projects in New York include the Four Seasons hotel, designed by I. M. Pei and Frank Williams; the Crowne Plaza Hotel in Times Square; the Rihga Royal Hotel (now the Hotel London); and Citylights, the first condominium in Queens West, a 74-acre riverfront development in Long Island City. In addition to his West Side apartment towers, Zeckendorf developed residential properties on the Upper East Side, in Midtown East, and in Battery Park City. In all, these projects brought the city of New York more than 4,000 new condominium and rental apartments.

In a rare venture outside of New York, Zeckendorf served as the managing development partner for the Ronald Reagan Building and International Trade Center, a 3.7 million square foot complex on the Federal Triangle in Washington, D.C., completed in 1998.

== Debt ==
Zeckendorf's policy of bringing in multiple partners to reduce his risk failed to protect him from major losses after the real estate market downturn in the late 1980s. By 1989, Zeckendorf found himself stranded in debt. When Zeckendorf was unable to renegotiate his debts, he lost his real estate holdings in New York. According to The Wall Street Journal, a habit of personally guaranteeing loans along with giving outside investors a greater share of profits than is customary contributed to Zeckendorf's financial problems.

Peter Model, Zeckendorf's former public relations representative, later said, "Bill Jr. devoted his life to making his father at least halfway whole and vowed never to end up as his father." Nonetheless, Model continued, "he became a mirror image of his father. His father sought publicity. Bill Jr. wasn't after publicity. His father was loud. [William Jr.] was quiet."

== Santa Fe ==
Zeckendorf spent the last 15 years of his life in Santa Fe, New Mexico, having vacationed there for years before that. By the time he relocated, he had been developing properties in Santa Fe for more than a decade. His projects include two luxury hotels, the Eldorado Hotel and the Hotel Santa Fe, and two residential complexes: Los Miradores, condominiums near St. John's College, and the Sierra del Norte subdivision off Hyde Park Road.

Along with his second wife, Nancy King Zeckendorf, a former ballerina with the Metropolitan Opera in New York who also performed with the Santa Fe Opera, Zeckendorf was instrumental in developing the Lensic Performing Arts Center, in a landmarked building erected as a movie theater in the 1930s. Nancy Zeckendorf continues to chair the center's board as a founding director.

Zeckendorf served on the boards of the local hospital, Christus St. Vincent, and the College of Santa Fe, as well as on the executive committee of the Santa Fe Chamber Music Society. In 2011, the Zeckendorfs were named Santa Fe Living Treasures, in recognition of their community service.

== Personal life ==
William Zeckendorf Jr.'s first marriage, to Norwegian Guri Lie, daughter of Trygve Lie, the first Secretary-General of the United Nations, ended in divorce. Their sons, William Lie and Arthur William, founded Zeckendorf Development in 1992, are the third generation of Zeckendorfs to become prominent developers. Their properties in Manhattan include luxury condominium towers at 15 Central Park West, 50 United Nations Plaza, and 520 Park Avenue.

Following his father's example, Zeckendorf was a trustee of Long Island University for 37 years, serving as board president from 1984 to 1992. Also like his father a knowledgeable wine collector, Zeckendorf was active for many years in La Confrerie des Chevaliers du Tastevin, a society of Burgundy connoisseurs.

Zeckendorf died of respiratory failure in Santa Fe, New Mexico, at the age of 84.

== Bibliography ==
- Zeckendorf Jr., William; with Joan Duncan Oliver. Developing: My Life, ORO Editions, 2021 (2nd ed.) ISBN 978-1-954-08133-8
