= Manhattantown =

Urban renewal project in New York City

Coordinates: 40.794224°N 73.963672°W

Manhattantown, now known as Park West Village or West Park Apartments, was a massive urban renewal project in New York City's Manhattan Valley neighborhood (formerly known as the Bloomingdale District). The project, which stretched between West 96th and West 100th streets, bordering Central Park West, was funded by Title I of the Housing Act of 1949, which financed slum clearance under urban redevelopment initiatives. Allegations of corruption were leveled soon after the project's inception in the spring of 1949, culminating in hearings in the Senate's Banking and Currency Committee in 1954.

But the Senate hearings garnered little publicity. It was not until 1956 that a series of investigative articles in the World Sun-Telegram by Gene Gleason and Fred Cook revealed the extent of the mismanagement. It was the first instance in which Robert Moses' practice of "honest graft"—the method by which Slum Clearance chairman Moses distributed premiums, contracts and retainers to favored and incompetent friends—was revealed in the press. Under Title I, the plot of tenements worth $15 million (equivalent to $203 million in 2025) had been sold, for $1 million (equivalent to $14 million in 2025), to developer Samuel Caspert, charged with building public housing. Instead of relocating occupants, bulldozing the slum, and constructing public housing, Caspert and Co. merely sat on the newly acquired property collecting millions in rents. In the end, the city was forced to facilitate the transfer of Manhattantown to another developer, William Zeckendorf.
