= Roosevelt Field (shopping mall) =

Indoor mall on Long Island, New York, United States

Coordinates: 40°44′17″N 73°36′45″W

Roosevelt Field Mall
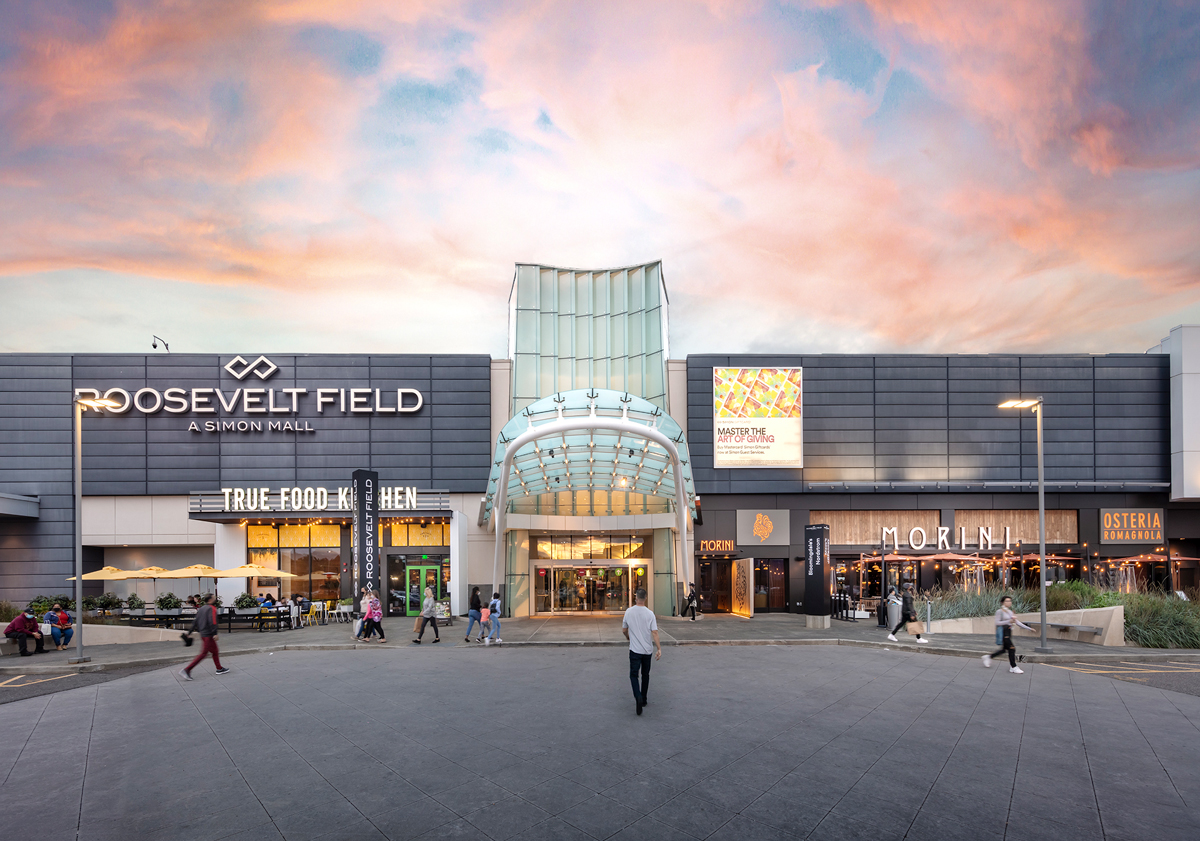
- The west entrance to Roosevelt Field Mall
- Location: 630 Old Country Road, East Garden City (Uniondale), New York
- Opened: December 14, 1956; 69 years ago
- Developer: Webb and Knapp and William Zeckendorf designed by I. M. Pei
- Manager: Simon Property Group
- Owner: Simon Property Group
- Num. of stores: 243
- Num. of anchor tenants: 7
- Floor area: 2,372,053 ft^{2} (220,371 m^{2})
- Floors: 3 with concourse
- Parking: 4 parking garages; lighted lot
- Public transit: Nassau Inter-County Express: n15, n16, n22, n22X, n24, n27, n35, n43 (at the Roosevelt Field Mall Bus Terminal); Long Island Rail Road: Mineola (via n22, n24), Carle Place (via n22)
- Website: www.simon.com/mall/roosevelt-field

Roosevelt Field is a shopping mall in the East Garden City section of Uniondale, New York. It is the largest shopping mall on Long Island, the second-largest in the state of New York (after Destiny USA), and the eleventh-largest shopping mall in the United States.

Designed by architect I. M. Pei, Roosevelt Field Mall is owned and managed by Simon Property Group. It is the second most successful mall in the state. Major retailers at the mall include Primark, Dick's Sporting Goods, JCPenney, Macy's, Nordstrom, Bloomingdale's, and Neiman Marcus.

== Location ==
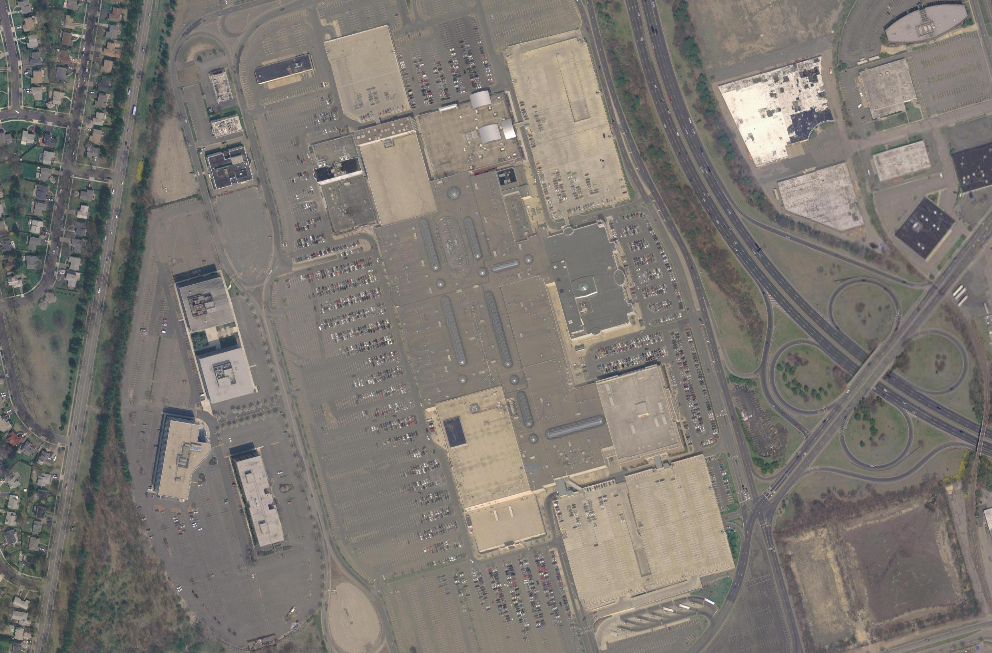
Satellite photo of the mall in 2008

Roosevelt Field is located adjacent to the Meadowbrook State Parkway, making it accessible from both the Northern State Parkway and the Southern State Parkway. It also serves as major bus transportation hub for Nassau Inter-County Express (NICE), with several of its bus routes stopping at a bus terminal located adjacent the mall's southern parking garage.

The mall was constructed on the site of (and is named for) Roosevelt (Hazelhurst) Field – the airport where Charles Lindbergh began his historic transatlantic flight to Paris, France. At one time, a plaque at the north end of the mall – in the hallway which as of 2025 connects Dick's Sporting Goods and JCPenney – marked the spot from where Lindbergh took off in the Spirit of St. Louis during the famous event. This plaque was later moved near the Disney Store, but was removed during a renovation to the mall in the 2010s.

== History ==
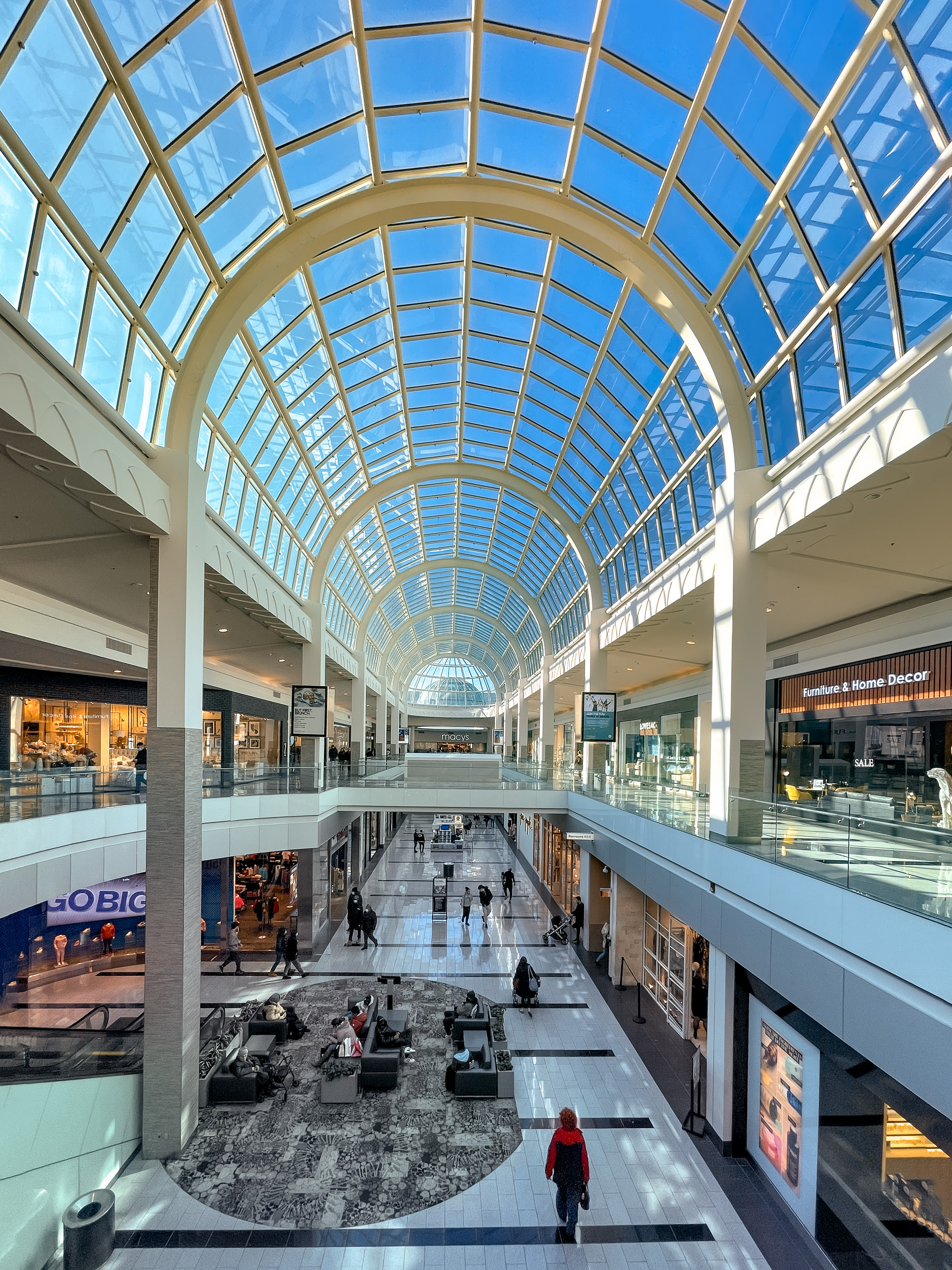
Interior of Roosevelt Field in 2022

=== Before the mall ===
The mall's location was previously the Roosevelt Field airport. Roosevelt Field served as the take-off site for many famous aviators such as Amelia Earhart and Wiley Post. Charles Lindbergh's solo transatlantic flight took off from Roosevelt Field in 1927. The field was originally named Hazelhurst Field and was renamed in honor of Theodore Roosevelt's son, Quentin, who died in World War I.

In 1950, Manhattan-based real estate company Webb and Knapp, led by New York real estate developer William Zeckendorf, gained a controlling interest in the airfield, which it closed one year later, in 1951.

=== Roosevelt Field Mall ===
After the airfield was closed in 1951, Zeckendorf announced that he, through Webb and Knapp, would redevelop the site as the Roosevelt Field Mall and Garden City Plaza. Designed by Webb and Knapp's chief architect, I. M. Pei, the new Roosevelt Field Mall, upon its opening, would be the largest shopping mall in North America.

Ground was broken on the $35 million project in April 1955. The mall opened the following year with a single level and was an open-air center. It included a Woolworth five-and-dime store, a Walgreens drug store, a Food Fair supermarket, a Buster Brown shoe store, a public auditorium, a movie theater, and an outdoor ice rink. The original anchor of the mall was a 3-level 320,000 ft^{2} (29,700 m^{2}) Macy's, which opened on August 29, 1956.

In 1962, a 250,000 ft^{2} (23,200 m^{2}) Gimbels store opened. Today, the structure houses Dick's Sporting Goods and Primark. With the addition, the complex held over 1,000,000 ft^{2} (92,900 m^{2}). A major extension was completed in 1964. Macy's had an 85,000 ft^{2} (7,900 m^{2}) third level added. In 1968, The Century Roosevelt Cinema began operation. At that time, the mall was enclosed.

In 1971, a 3-level, 260,000 ft^{2} (24,200 m^{2}) Alexander's was completed. In 1972, a 3-level 259,000 ft^{2} (24,100 m^{2}) J.C. Penney was added which was later completely renovated in 2010.

An upper level of stores and food court was established in 1993 after a major renovation which started in 1991; the mall's bus terminal was also relocated to its present location about this time. When Alexander's went bankrupt in 1992, Abraham & Straus gutted the building and extensively renovated it, opening in 1992. As such, Roosevelt Field had as anchors the three department stores – Macy's, Abraham & Straus, and Stern's – during the first half of the 1990s. The Abraham & Straus location at the mall lasted only until 1995, when the chain became defunct. Subsequently, the store space was then renovated, re-opening as a Bloomingdale's – which relocated there from its former Franklin Avenue location in downtown Garden City – later that year.

==== 21st century ====
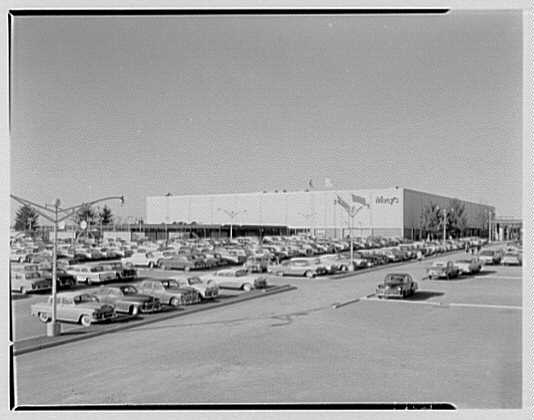
The Macy's at Roosevelt Field in 1957

The former Gimbels anchor was a Stern's between 1987 and 2001. After Stern's closed, the spot was taken over by Galyan's, which opened in 2003 (later bought out by Dick's Sporting Goods in 2004). Dick's Sporting Goods occupied the eastern section and Bloomingdale's Furniture Gallery, which opened in 2004, occupied the western half until closing in 2019. A new, 3-story Nordstrom and a 2-story wing leading to the new Nordstrom opened in August 1997. Simon Property Group took ownership of the mall in 1998, when it acquired Corporate Property Investors.

In March 2012, it was announced that a new, 100,000-square-foot (9,300 m^{2}) wing, anchored by luxury department store Neiman Marcus, would be added to Roosevelt Field. Opened on February 19, 2016, this expansion also created room for additional shops leading up to the luxury department store, and was accompanied by the erection of a new parking structure and a center-wide renovation & modernization project. In 2015, during the renovation of the mall, the glass elevators in the center were removed to create a play area and new elevators were built to replace them. Simon had discovered that the scenic elevators had to be removed due to severe hydraulic oil leakage.

On November 17, 2022, Ireland-based retailer Primark opened its first Long Island store at the mall, in the space formerly occupied by Bloomingdale's Furniture Gallery.

By 2023, Roosevelt Field had announced several newer additions, among them are Brilliant Earth, Rudsak, TYR, Kendra Scott, Primark, Savage X Fenty, Warby Parker, TAG Heuer, Armani Exchange, Offline by Aerie, and the return of Abercrombie & Fitch.

== Bus terminal ==
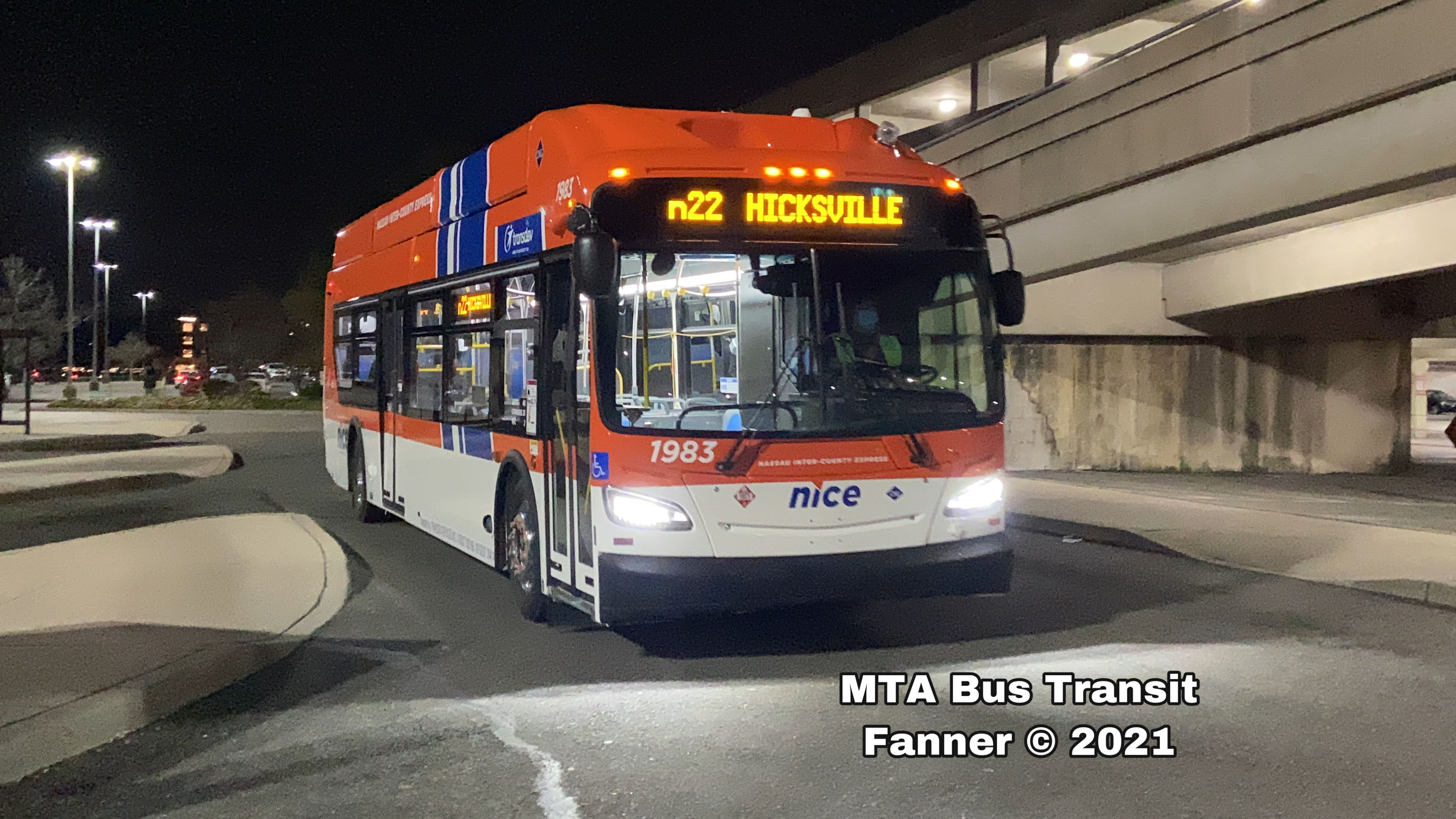
An n22 bus at the Roosevelt Field Mall Bus Terminal in 2021

Roosevelt Field serves as a major hub for buses operated by Nassau Inter-County Express (NICE), containing the Roosevelt Field Mall Bus Terminal. The seven-bay terminal is located on the south side of the mall, adjacent to its south parking garage.

As of March 2025, the mall is directly served by the n15, n16, n22, n22X, n24, n27, n35, and n43 Nassau Inter-County Express bus routes, via the mall's bus terminal.

== See also ==
- Smith Haven Mall
- Walt Whitman Shops
