= Roosevelt Field Mall Bus Terminal =

Bus terminal in Nassau County, New York

Coordinates: 40°44′6″N 73°36′39″W

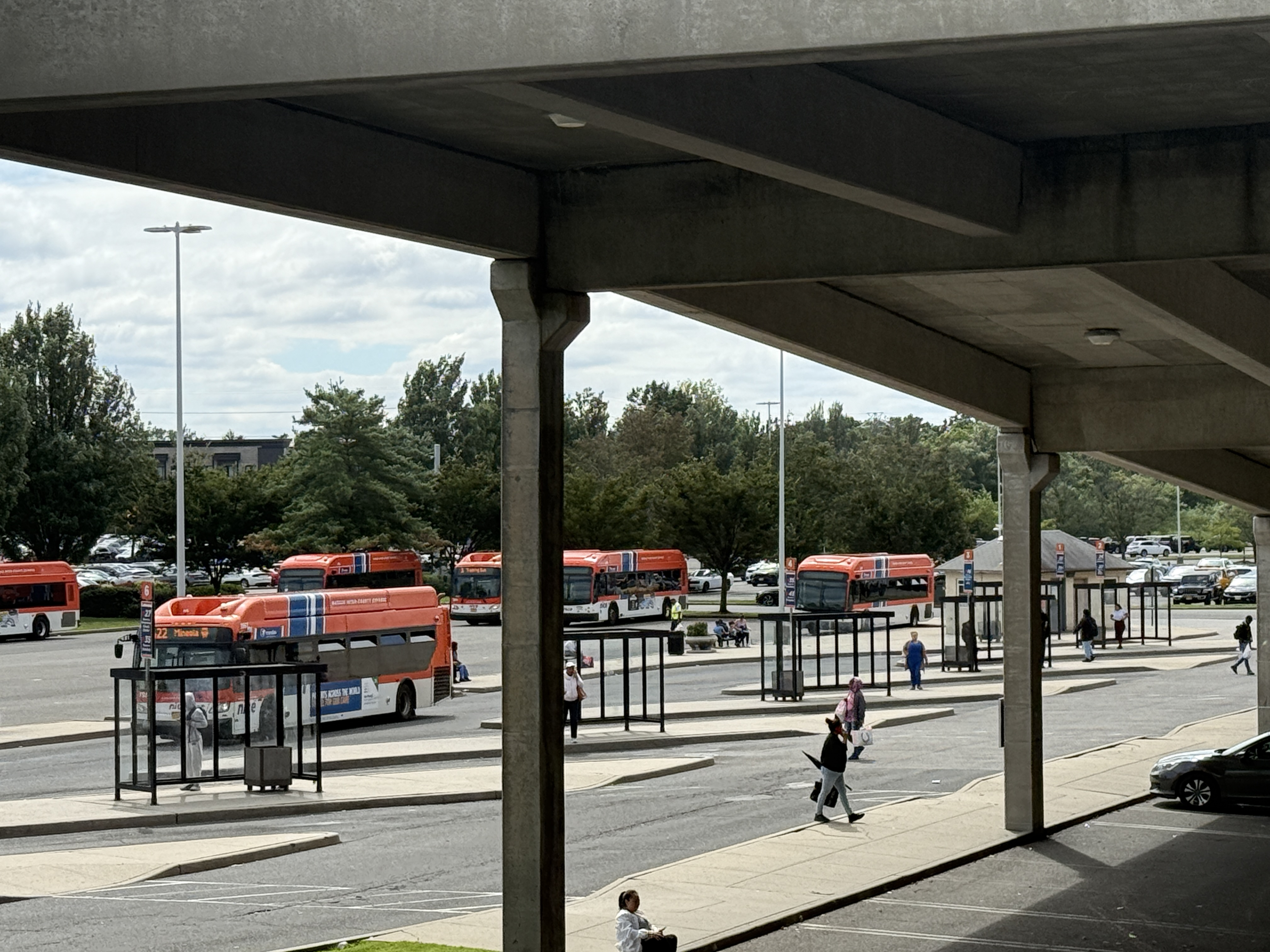
- The Roosevelt Field Mall Bus Terminal in 2025

General information
- Location: Roosevelt Field Mall; East Garden City (Uniondale), New York
- Operator: Nassau Inter-County Express
- Bus routes: 8 NICE Bus routes
- Bus stands: 7
- Bus operators: Nassau Inter-County Express

Construction
- Structure type: At-grade
- Platform levels: 1
- Parking: Yes
- Accessible: Yes

History
- Opened: c. 1956
- Rebuilt: 1991
Location

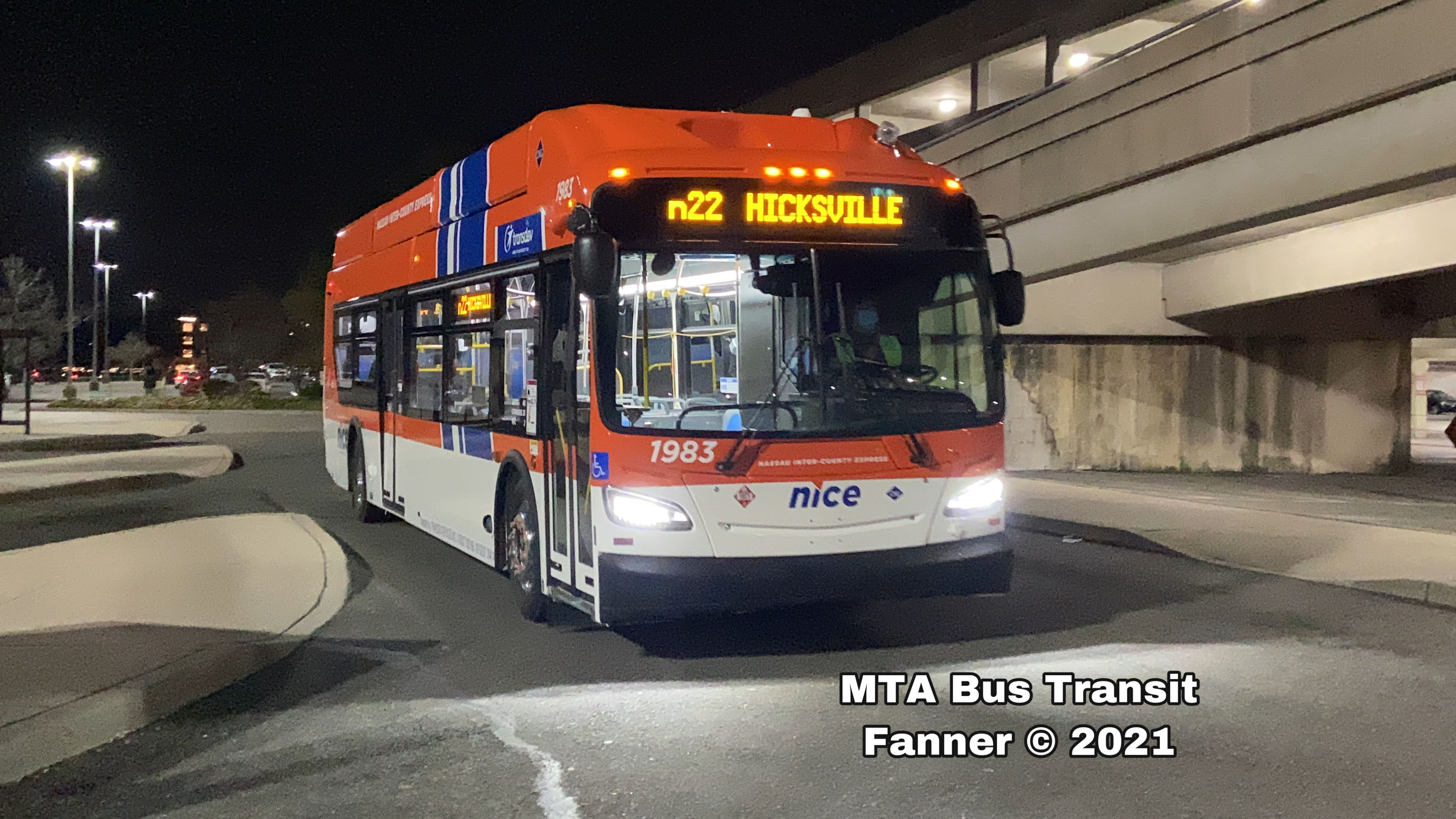
A Hicksville-bound n22 bus at the Roosevelt Field Bus Terminal in 2021

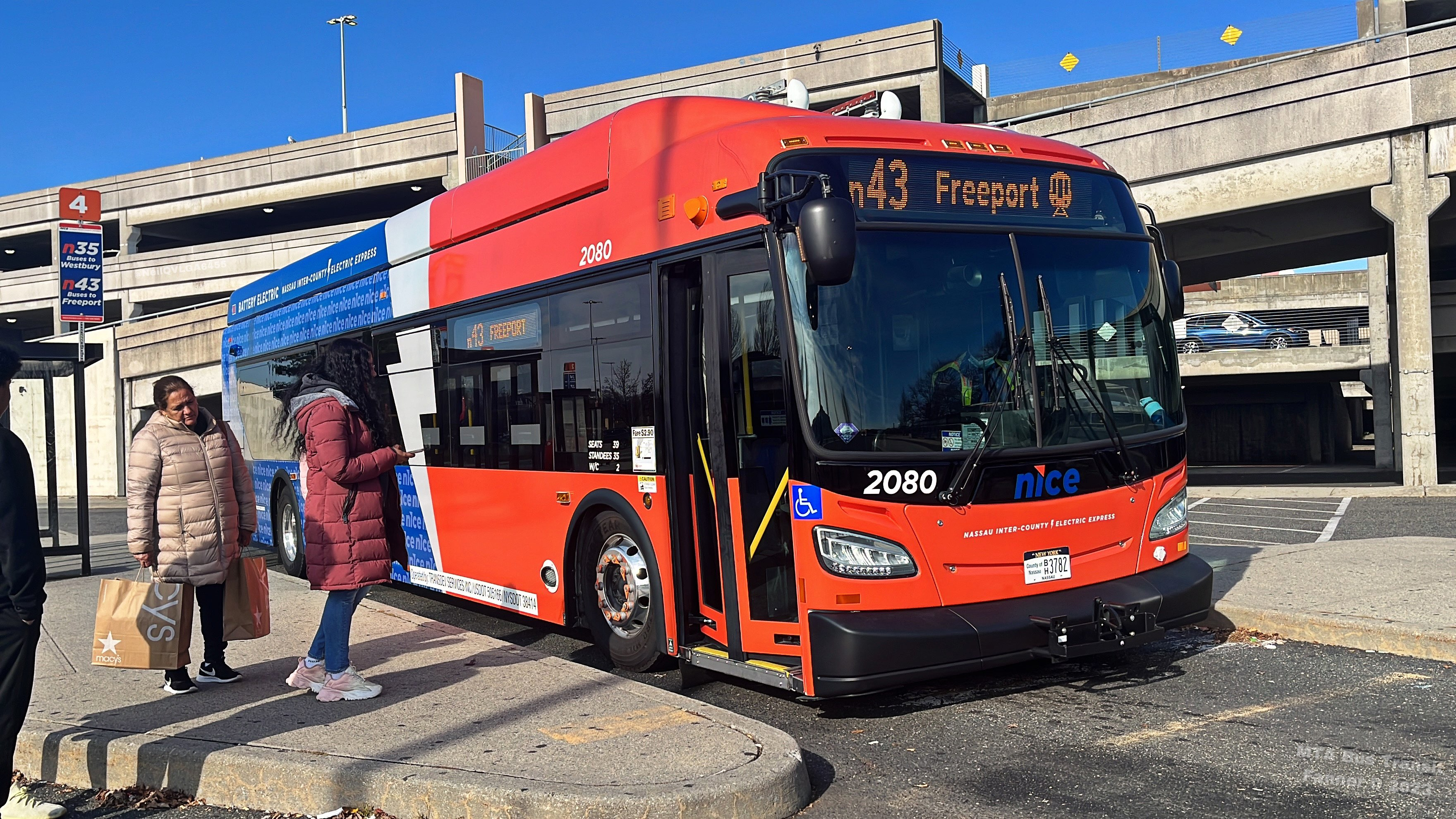
A Freeport-bound n43 bus at the terminal in 2023

The Roosevelt Field Mall Bus Terminal (also known as the Roosevelt Field Bus Terminal or simply the Roosevelt Field Bus Station) is a major bus hub serving bus routes operated by Nassau Inter-County Express (NICE), located at the south end of Roosevelt Field Mall in the East Garden City section of Uniondale, Nassau County, New York. It features a total of seven bus bays and is located adjacent to the mall's south parking garage.

== History ==
Buses began serving the Roosevelt Field Mall about the time of the shopping center's opening in 1956. By the early 1960s, as demand grew, additional bus services began serving the mall, stopping at the original bus terminal on the west side of the center.

In 1965, Schenck Transportation Co. – at the time one of Nassau County's major bus operators – provided express bus service between Roosevelt Field & various other points in Nassau County and the 1964 New York World's Fair in Flushing Meadows–Corona Park, Queens.

In 1991, the present bus terminal opened on the south side of the mall, having been relocated from the west side. This move came when the mall was undergoing a major expansion project, which included the addition of its second floor. The relocated facility would also simplify the bus routes through the area, as previously, several buses serving the mall had to travel most of the way around the center to enter the terminal.

== Layout ==
The Roosevelt Field Mall Bus Terminal features a total of seven bus bays on a single level. It is located adjacent to – and south of – the mall's Orange (south) Parking Deck. Adjacent to Bay 1 is a security booth and vending machines. Parking and a plaza containing another passenger waiting area are located immediately south of all seven bays.

== Bus routes ==
As of March 2025, the bus terminal is served by eight bus routes: the n15, n16, n22, n22x, n24, n27, n35, and n43. All eight of these bus routes are operated by Nassau Inter-County Express.

Route	Termini		Via
n15	Mineola Intermodal Center	Long Beach LIRR Station	County Seat Drive, Woodfield Road, Long Beach Road (rush hours only)
n16	Rockville Centre LIRR Station	Terminus	Westbury Boulevard, Hempstead Avenue
n22	Jamaica at 168th Street Bus Terminal	Hicksville LIRR Station	Hillside Avenue, Westbury Avenue, Prospect Avenue, West John Street
n22x	Jamaica at 168th Street Bus Terminal	Terminus	Hillside Avenue, Herricks Road, Old Country Road, East Gate Boulevard, Zeckendorf Boulevard
n24	Jamaica at 168th Street Bus Terminal	Hicksville LIRR Station	Hillside Avenue, Jericho Turnpike, Old Country Road
n27	Hempstead Transit Center	Glen Cove	Jackson Street, Westbury Boulevard, Oak Street, Commercial Avenue, Quentin Roosevelt Boulevard, Stewart Avenue, Glen Cove Road, Jericho Turnpike, Roslyn Road, Harbor Hill Road, Glen Cove Road, Glen Cove Avenue
n35	Terminus	Baldwin	Clinton Road, Grand Avenue
n40	Mineola Intermodal Center	Freeport LIRR Station	Franklin Street, Columbia Street, Main Street (Hempstead), Nassau Road/North Main Street
n43	Terminus	Freeport LIRR Station	Uniondale Avenue, Babylon Turnpike, Grand Avenue, North Main Street

== See also ==
- Transportation on Long Island
- Long Beach station (LIRR)
- Mineola Intermodal Center
- Rosa Parks Hempstead Transit Center
