= William Zeckendorf =

American real estate developer

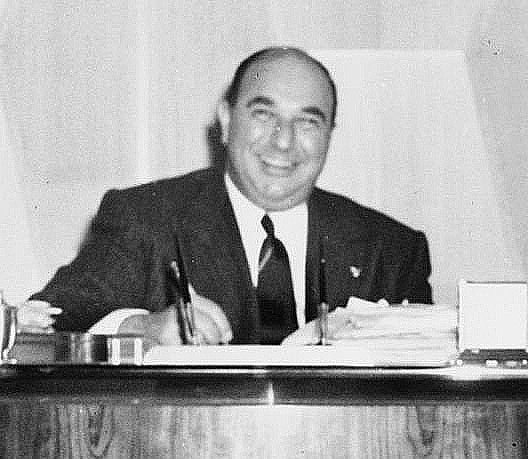
- Zeckendorf in New York, 1952
- Born: William Zeckendorf; June 30, 1905; Paris, Illinois, U.S.
- Died: September 30, 1976 (aged 71); New York City, U.S.
- Occupation: Real estate developer
- Known for: Development of Place Ville Marie
- Spouses: Irma Levy (divorced); Marion Griffin (until death); Alice Odenheimer Bache; Louise Betterly Malcolm, his widow
- Children: with Levy: William Zeckendorf Jr.; Susan Zeckendorf Nicholson

William Zeckendorf Sr. (June 30, 1905 – September 30, 1976) was a prominent American real estate developer. Through his development company Webb and Knapp — for which he began working in 1938 and which he purchased in 1949 — he developed a significant portion of the New York City urban landscape. Architects I. M. Pei and Le Corbusier designed structures for Zeckendorf's development projects.

== Early life ==
Zeckendorf was born to a Jewish family in Paris, Illinois, the son of a hardware store manager. His family moved to New York City when he was three years old. He attended New York University but dropped out to work at the real estate company of his uncle, Sam Borchard. He soon left his uncle's firm to work for Webb & Knapp, a small New York building manager and brokerage.

== Career ==
Zeckendorf's most notable property acquisition, and potential development of a "dream city" to rival Rockefeller Center, was a 17-acre (69,000 m^{2}) site along the East River between 42nd Street and 48th Street. In a now celebrated transaction in December 1946, the prominent architect Wallace Harrison and Nelson Rockefeller bought the site from him for $8.5 million ($140 million in 2025) and Nelson's father John D. Rockefeller Jr. subsequently donated this land for the building of the United Nations Headquarters.

Zeckendorf also owned New York's famous Chrysler Building and the venerable Hotel Astor in Times Square as well as the Commodore Hotel, the Drake Hotel, Hotel Manhattan and the Chatham Hotel. He purchased Chicago's famous Robie House in 1958, before transferring ownership to the University of Chicago. He developed two of I. M. Pei's early skyscrapers — the Mile High Center (now part of Wells Fargo Center) in downtown Denver, and Place Ville Marie in downtown Montreal.

Zeckendorf also partnered with Chicago real estate titan Arthur Rubloff to develop a stretch of Michigan Avenue into what Rubloff dubbed the Magnificent Mile. The Rubloff Company was eventually acquired by Prudential and subsequently has become a division of Berkshire Hathaway.

The real estate tycoon and his company, Webb & Knapp, also were involved in theme park investment following the successful debut of Disneyland. Zeckendorf came to know C.V. Wood, who first helped build Disneyland as a Disney employee and then developed theme parks in Colorado, Massachusetts, New York (on Zeckendorf's property) and Texas under his own Marco Engineering company. Zeckendorf and his company enjoyed various connections to the Marco Engineering parks.

In New York, Wood created and built Freedomland U.S.A. on marshland that had been owned by Zeckendorf since the early 1950s. The property was located in The Bronx, a borough of New York City. The park lasted just five years (1960–1964) and it was under various layers of management that included Zeckendorf and his son. According to Zeckendorf in a newspaper article that appeared during 1970, the theme park, unknown to the public at the time, served as a "placeholder" for the land to obtain variances that permitted the construction on the marshland of the world's largest co-operative housing project known as Co-op City. Zeckendorf's ownership of the land and his role in Freedomland are documented in the book Freedomland U.S.A.: The Definitive History (Theme Park Press, 2019).

== Deal with Spyros Skouras ==
In December 1958, Zeckendorf entered into a deal with Spyros Skouras, head of 20th Century-Fox, to purchase Fox's project to develop 176 acres (0.71 km^{2}) of its historic backlot in Los Angeles, California, into a proposed US$400,000,000 (equivalent to $4,463,667,820 in 2025) Century City. The studio had suffered a string of expensive flops, culminating in the box-office disaster Cleopatra (1963) and was in dire need of money. The project, conceived under the direction of Edmund Herrscher, the studio's director of property development, had been announced the first week of 1958, with construction said to begin in July 1958.

However, construction did not start as promised, and rumors, later confirmed, circulated that developer Zeckendorf would take over the project by purchasing 20th's interest in the project for US$53 million. The following March it was announced that construction would begin that month on the new headquarters for architect Welton Becket, chief architect on the project That did not occur either. Zeckendorf hired New York public relations executive Tex McCrary to lend new life and visibility to the project. McCrary, in turn contracted with Los Angeles publicist Charles A. Pomerantz, well known in the entertainment industry, to come up with a campaign and execute it.

Pomerantz turned to a young publicist he had hired, Worley Thorne, the only other publicist in the small firm, for suggestions. Thorne said he'd call friends in the press to assess their attitudes. Thorne learned that there was deep skepticism that the project would ever be built. 20th did not have the money, which is why they brought in Zeckendorf, but apparently Zeckendorf was unable to deliver even the $53-million purchase price, let alone $400 million. The California papers had already given a lot of publicity to Century City and, for them, any more coverage would just be re-hash in which they were not interested.

Thorne reported to Pomerantz his opinion that the only way to restore credibility to the project was to actually "begin" construction, and Pomerantz went for the plan. Thorne called Herrscher and asked if there was some small building they could demolish with a bulldozer, to begin to "break ground" for the Becket building. Herrscher said there was a tin shack that was expendable and he'd make it available, as well as the bulldozer. McCrary and William Zeckendorf, Jr., vice-president of Webb & Knapp, also approved. Thorne said that it should be a large affair with the mayors of Los Angeles, Beverly Hills, and Santa Monica, plus politicians and other dignitaries, invited, as well as all the Southern California press. He and Pomerantz would find a star to "launch" the project by breaking a bottle of champagne on the shack prior to its being demolished. Later, they secured Mary Pickford for that task. It was all purely symbolic, since construction did not actually begin, but no one stated that openly, it was dramatic, and very successful. The Los Angeles Times devoted almost three full pages to its coverage of the event.

Still lacking sufficient money, Zeckendorf was forced to make US$1,000 per day penalty payments to Fox. In 1960, Zeckendorf solved his problem by partnering with Alcoa in a joint-venture relationship to finally build Century City, which by now had escalated to a US$500,000,000 (equivalent to $5,441,507,312 in 2025) project. The new owners embraced the studio's conception of Century City as "a city within a city" with the arc-shaped, 19-story Century Plaza Hotel to be the centerpiece. This joint-venture marked an increasing interest by large corporations with land "surplus" in order to create housing communities, industrial parks and office buildings; marking the first movement from traditional industry into real estate investing.

== Bankruptcy ==
Before Webb and Knapp's bankruptcy in 1965, Zeckendorf became the embodiment of glamorous real-estate dealmaking, which included developing Roosevelt Airfield, where Charles Lindbergh began his transatlantic flight, and helping to advance and develop Long Island University. From the start of his career Zeckendorf had been able to use his dealmaking skills to acquire or build projects for which he lacked the funds, but in time the under-funding caught up with him, and "his overextended company crashed in a spectacular bankruptcy." He then worked for his son, William Jr., with his wages garnished in order to settle his debts.

== Personal life ==
Zeckendorf was married four times. His first wife was Irma Levy; they had two children: William Zeckendorf Jr. and Susan Zeckendorf Nicholson. They later divorced and she remarried to the music critic and historian Irving Kolodin. His second wife was Marion Griffin who died in 1968. In 1972, he married Alice Odenheimer Bache, widow of Harold L. Bache. They subsequently divorced and he married Louise Betterly Malcolm in 1975.

On September 30, 1976, William Zeckendorf died in bankruptcy at his residence on 65th Street and Park Avenue after suffering a stroke.

== Bibliography ==
- Zeckendorf, William; McCreary, Edward A. (1970). The Autobiography of William Zeckendorf, with Edward McCreary (1st ed.). New York: Holt, Rinehart and Winston. ISBN 0-030-84494-0. LCCN 70103560. OCLC 749022917. OL 5697773M.

== See also ==
- L'Enfant Plaza
- Place Ville Marie
- Roosevelt Field shopping mall
- Zeckendorf Towers
