= Webb and Knapp =

Former real estate development firm

- Industry: Real estate development
- Founded: 1922; 104 years ago
- Founder: Robert C. Knapp; W. Seward Webb
- Defunct: after 1965

Webb and Knapp was an 20th century American real estate development firm.

== Overview ==
The company is most famous for redeveloping the Roosevelt Airfield, which was the launching site of the transatlantic flights of Charles Lindbergh and Amelia Earhart. It was also the firm at which famed architect I. M. Pei first worked from 1948 to 1956.

== History ==
The company was founded in 1922 by Robert C. Knapp and W. Seward Webb.

William Zeckendorf joined the firm in 1938 and acquired it in 1949.

In 1965, the company filed for bankruptcy protection and Roosevelt Airfield was sold to Corporate Property Investors. The company's total assets of about US$21.5 million (equivalent to $159 million in 2025) were dwarfed by its total liabilities of about $60 million (equivalent to $454 million in 2025) and contingent tax liabilities of $29.4 million (equivalent to $223 million in 2025).

== Notable projects ==
- Roosevelt Field (shopping mall)

== See also ==
- Mills Corporation
- Simon Property Group
