= Eric Ian Spoutz =

American art dealer

Eric Ian Hornak-Spoutz
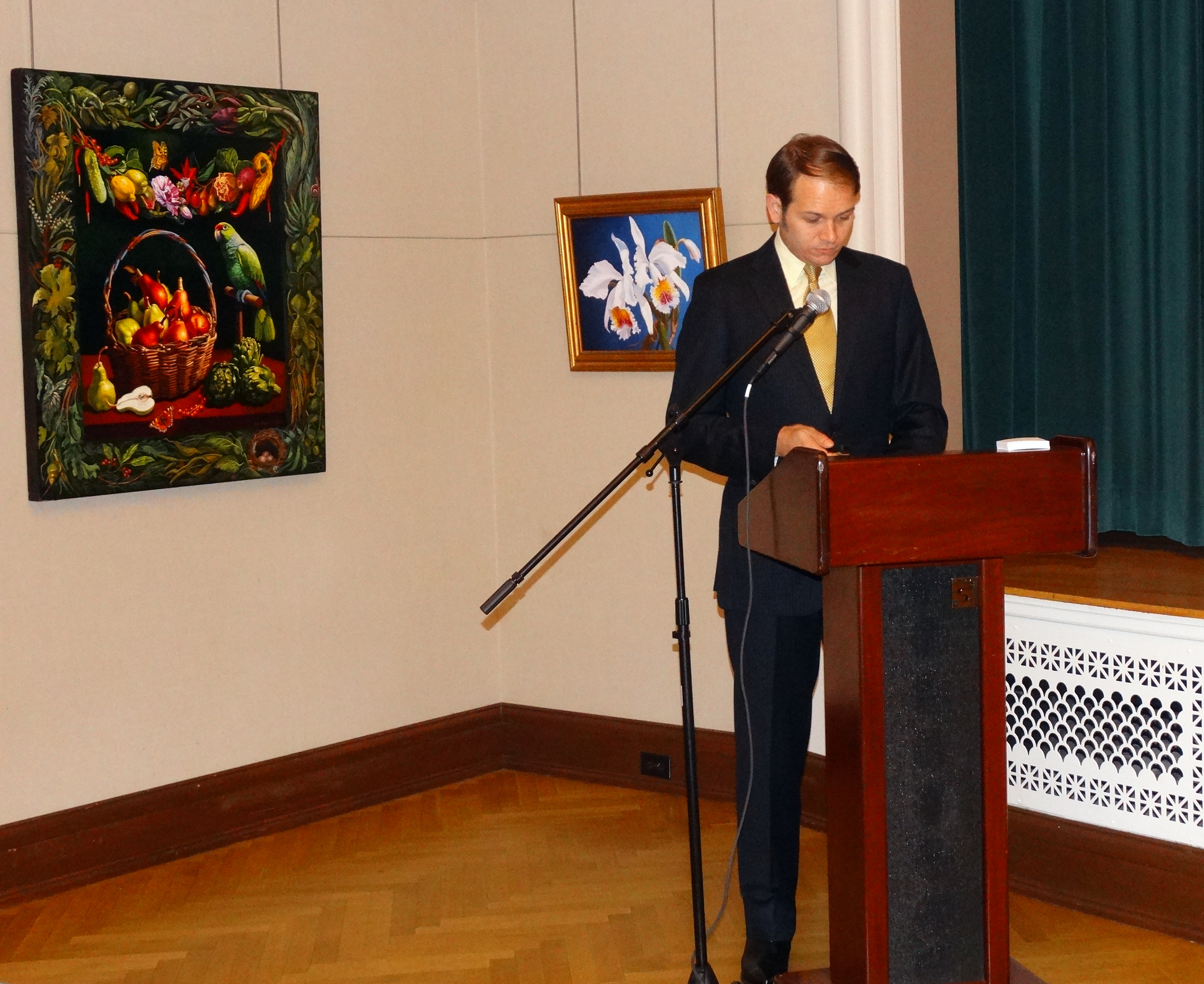
- Spoutz lecturing at the Washington County Museum of Fine Arts in Hagerstown, Maryland in 2013
- Born: Eric Ian Spoutz; August 3, 1983 (age 43); Mount Clemens, Michigan
- Education: Fort Hays State University; Rutgers University
- Occupations: Art dealer; curator
- Parent: Rosemary Hornak
- Relatives: Ian Hornak; Julius Rosenthal Wolf
- Website: www.hornak-spoutz.com

Eric Ian Hornak-Spoutz (born August 3, 1983) is an American art dealer, and curator. He has owned and operated art galleries in Detroit, Michigan; Cape Coral and Palm Beach, Florida; and Los Angeles, California.

== Early life and family ==
Eric Ian Hornak-Spoutz was born on August 3, 1983, in Mount Clemens, Michigan, to Carl Steven Spoutz, a real estate developer, and Rosemary Hornak, a visual artist. He was named after his maternal uncle, Ian Hornak, a founding Hyperrealist and Photorealist artist.

Ian Hornak’s longtime partner was Julius Rosenthal Wolf, a casting director, theatrical agent, and art dealer who served as vice president of General Amusement Corporation and was previously associated with Edith Halpert’s Downtown Gallery in New York City.

Hornak-Spoutz’s parents divorced in 1993, after which he was raised by his mother, with significant involvement from his paternal grandparents and his uncle. He lived in Mount Clemens during the school year and spent the remainder of his time among family residences in East Hampton, Manhattan, and Palm Beach.

At the age of sixteen, Hornak-Spoutz became his uncle’s studio manager in East Hampton. In 2002, following the deaths of his paternal grandfather and Ian Hornak, he became co-trustee of his grandfather’s estate and executor of his uncle’s estate.

== Education ==
Hornak-Spoutz completed his secondary education at Cardinal Mooney Catholic College Preparatory School, graduating in 2001. He subsequently earned a Bachelor of General Studies degree from Fort Hays State University, with concentrations in General Business and Historical Studies and a minor in English. He later completed the coursework toward a Master of Arts in Liberal Studies degree (all but thesis) at Rutgers University, concentrating in Creative Arts and Literature.

Hornak-Spoutz also completed undergraduate certificate programs in Legal Studies and Employment Law at Adams State University; Legal Secretarial Studies and Legal Investigation at California State University, Monterey Bay; and Cultural Diversity Studies at Fort Hays State University.

== Career ==
In 2003, Hornak-Spoutz founded the Eric I. Spoutz Gallery in the Fisher Building in Detroit, Michigan, at the age of nineteen. The gallery specialized in Photorealist and Hyperrealist artwork. An early exhibition, Lowell Nesbitt: A Retrospective (2004), was the largest presentation of the artist’s work since his death in 1993.

From 2007 to 2017, Hornak-Spoutz placed works by numerous artists into the permanent collections of major American institutions. These included the Smithsonian American Art Museum; the Smithsonian Institution’s National Museum of American History, Archives of American Art; the Library of Congress; the Board of Governors of the Federal Reserve System; the Detroit Institute of Arts; the Museum of Fine Arts, Boston; the Zimmerli Art Museum at Rutgers University; and a range of other museums, universities, hospitals, and public collections.

Hornak-Spoutz also curated traveling museum exhibitions across the United States, including an exhibition at the Federal Reserve Board of Governors in Washington, D.C., in 2013 for the second inauguration of Barack Obama as President of the United States, and sponsored by the Chair Federal Reserve, Ben Bernanke. Additional venues included the Washington County Museum of Fine Arts, the Kinsey Institute, and the Anton Art Center.

During the City of Detroit bankruptcy, Hornak-Spoutz appeared as a media commentator for outlets including The Detroit News, where he discussed valuations of the Detroit Institute of Arts collection and other municipal artworks amid international debate regarding their potential sale.

In 2013, Hornak-Spoutz opened Gallery 928 at The Westin Cape Coral Resort at Marina Village in Cape Coral, Florida, exhibiting contemporary artists alongside works by Andy Warhol, Joan Miro, and Pablo Picasso. The gallery closed in 2014, after which Hornak-Spoutz relocated to Los Angeles and launched an online dealership specializing in blue chip artwork.

== Personal life ==
Hornak-Spoutz has lived in East Hampton, New York; Palm Beach, Florida; Dallas, Texas; and Los Angeles, California. He later returned to his home state of Michigan and currently resides in Auburn Hills.

In 2012, Hornak-Spoutz married Natasha Gavroski in Beverly Hills, California. The marriage ended in divorce in April 2018. In April 2023, he became engaged during a private proposal in Detroit, Michigan. He was married during the Solar eclipse of April 8, 2024, at a group wedding ceremony titled “Totality of the heart” held in Trenton, Ohio.

== Legal matters ==
Hornak-Spoutz v. Kahn

In October 2024, Hornak-Spoutz filed a civil action against artist Scott Kahn in the Supreme Court of the State of New York, County of Westchester, seeking $7,500,000 USD in damages. The complaint alleged a professional relationship dating to 2011, including exhibitions, museum acquisitions, and a proposed $40,000,000 to $60,000,000 USD retrospective exhibition at Phillips Asia in Hong Kong that was allegedly terminated shortly before opening.

United States v. Spoutz

On February 3, 2016, Hornak-Spoutz was arrested by the Federal Bureau of Investigation pursuant to a criminal complaint filed in the Southern District of New York. He was charged with wire fraud in connection with the sale of forged artworks. He subsequently pleaded guilty on June 3, 2016, before Judge Lewis A. Kaplan to one count of wire fraud. During sentencing proceedings, letters seeking leniency were submitted by John Ellis, Ronnie Landfield, Scott Kahn, and the executive director of the Heidelberg Project. On February 16, 2017, Hornak-Spoutz was sentenced to forty-one months imprisonment at Federal Correctional Institution, Morgantown, followed by three years of supervised release, and was ordered to forfeit $1,450,000 and pay $154,100 in restitution.
