= Ian Hornak =

American painter

Ian John Hornak
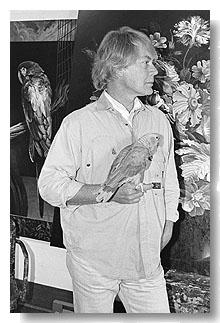
- Hornak in his East Hampton, New York studio, 1997
- Born: John Francis Hornak; January 9, 1944; Philadelphia, Pennsylvania, U.S.
- Died: December 9, 2002 (aged 58); Southampton, New York U.S.
- Education: Wayne State University (BFA), (MFA)
- Occupation: Visual artist
- Relatives: Julius Rosenthal Wolf (domestic partner); Rosemary Hornak (sister); Eric Ian Spoutz (nephew)
- Website: ianhornak.org

Ian Hornak (born John Francis Hornak; January 9, 1944 – December 9, 2002) was an American draughtsman, painter, and printmaker. He was a founding figure of the Hyperrealist and Photorealist movements and is credited with being the first Photorealist artist to incorporate the visual effects of multiple exposure photography into landscape painting. He was also among the first contemporary artists to fully extend pictorial imagery beyond the primary canvas onto its surrounding frame, expanding conventional boundaries between image and object.

== Early life and family ==
Ian Hornak, born John Francis Hornak on January 9, 1944, in Philadelphia, Pennsylvania, was the son of František Hornák (later known as Frank Hornak), a Slovak born immigrant, and Rose Hornak, who was born in Coaldale, Pennsylvania, to Slovak parents. Although Ian Hornak's year of birth is widely cited as 1944, documentation in his papers held by the Smithsonian Institution's Archives of American Art indicates that he was born on January 9, 1943; the discrepancy has been attributed to a later passport error.

Hornak's father was born on January 28, 1909, in Pusté Sady, Galanta, then part of the Kingdom of Hungary within Austria-Hungary, and now located in Slovakia. After immigrating to the United States, he adopted the Americanized name Frank Hornak.

Following Hornak's birth, the family relocated to Brooklyn Heights, New York City, where his mother operated a confectionery business. During Hornak's childhood, the family moved again to Mount Clemens, Michigan, where they purchased and worked a farm. These transitions between urban and rural environments shaped Hornak's early family life and formative experiences.

== Education ==
Ian Hornak attended New Haven High School in Michigan, where he distinguished himself academically and graduated as a member of the National Honor Society. He briefly studied at the University of Michigan-Dearborn before transferring to Wayne State University in Detroit, where he pursued formal training in studio art.

In 1962, while enrolled at Wayne State, Hornak was awarded a two-year General Motors Scholarship, described at the time as one of the highest-paying scholarships offered by the university. The award covered tuition, room and board, books, and additional expenses, and was granted in recognition of his superior academic record and extracurricular achievements. During his undergraduate years, one of Hornak's paintings was selected as one of the ten best works in the university's annual student art exhibition and was acquired for Wayne State University's permanent art collection.

Hornak earned a Bachelor of Fine Arts degree in studio art in 1964, followed by a Master of Fine Arts degree in studio art in 1966, completing his graduate studies at Wayne State University.

== Career and artwork ==
Career

Following the completion of his graduate studies, Hornak taught studio art between 1966 and 1968 at Henry Ford College and Wayne State University, balancing academic instruction with the early formation of his professional practice.

Hornak's entry into the New York art world developed through his association with Lowell Nesbitt, whom he met in Detroit through dealer Gertrude Kasle, founder of the Gertrude Kasle Gallery. Nesbitt, then among the most commercially and institutionally successful artists in New York, provided Hornak with both professional access and informal mentorship. In the summer of 1968, Hornak sublet one of Nesbitt's studios on West 14th Street in Manhattan's Meatpacking District, placing him at the geographic and cultural center of the city's art scene. Through Nesbitt, Hornak was introduced to artists including Willem de Kooning, Lee Krasner, Robert Motherwell, Robert Indiana, Claes Oldenburg, Andy Warhol, and Alex Katz. Many of these figures were not only central to the evolution of postwar American art but also became part of Hornak's personal and professional milieu.

Hornak's earliest New York exhibitions took place at Eleanor Ward’s Stable Gallery, one of the most influential galleries of the postwar era. The Stable Gallery had played a pivotal role in the careers of artists such as Willem de Kooning, Robert Rauschenberg, Jasper Johns, and Andy Warhol, and Hornak's inclusion there situated his work within a lineage of artists who shaped the transition from Abstract expressionism to Pop art.

In 1970, Jackson Pollock’s widow, artist Lee Krasner introduced Hornak to Jason McCoy, assistant director of the Tibor de Nagy Gallery. On Krasner's recommendation, McCoy and gallery founder Tibor de Nagy offered Hornak an exclusive contract and presented his first New York City solo exhibition in 1971. Tibor de Nagy Gallery was widely regarded as one of the most intellectually significant galleries of the period, credited with the discovery and promotion of artists such as Helen Frankenthaler, Grace Hartigan, Jane Freilicher, Fairfield Porter, Larry Rivers, and poets John Ashbery and Frank O’Hara. Hornak's close exposure to these artists and their work contributed to his interest in expanding the conceptual and compositional boundaries of Photorealism beyond mechanical transcription.

Despite a series of critically acclaimed and sold out exhibitions at Tibor de Nagy, Hornak transferred his representation in 1976 to the Fischbach Gallery. This move followed sustained interest from Aladar Marberger, director of Fischbach, who encouraged Hornak to make the change over the objections of Tibor de Nagy. At Fischbach, Hornak joined a stable that included artists such as Alex Katz, Chuck Close, Richard Artschwager, and Malcolm Morley, placing him within a context of painters actively redefining realism and representation. Hornak remained with Fischbach until 1984.

In 1985, Jimmy Ernst recommended Hornak to the Armstrong Gallery in New York City, where he held a single solo exhibition. The following year, Hornak transferred representation to the Katharina Rich Perlow Gallery based on the strength of the gallery's founder having seen a single botanical painting by Hornak at a group exhibition at the Arlene Bujese Gallery in East Hampton, New York. Between 1986 and 2002, he presented nine solo exhibitions with the gallery and remained under its representation until his death. This final phase of his career coincided with the sustained development of his mature work and marked the consolidation of his position within the New York art world.

Title: Hannah Tillich's Mirror: Rembrandt's Three Trees Transformed into The Expulsion From Eden by Hornak, acrylic on canvas, 60 x 120 inches, 1978.

Marcia Sewing, Variation III by Hornak, acrylic on canvas, Museum of Fine Arts, Boston, 1978

Artwork

Hornak's artistic production developed through a sequence of distinct yet interconnected phases, reflecting a sustained engagement with representation, photographic mediation, and classical compositional structure. Across painting, drawing, and printmaking, his work demonstrates a consistent concern with the translation of visual experience into constructed images, integrating photographic sources, symbolic framing devices, and carefully controlled spatial relationships.

Monochromatic figurative paintings 1966–1971

Hornak's earliest mature paintings, produced between 1966 and 1971, consist primarily of monochromatic figurative works that reflect his academic training and emphasis on draftsmanship. These paintings were constructed by drawing highly detailed human figures in pen and ink onto painted grounds, typically limited to restrained tonal ranges. Figures are rendered with anatomical precision and pronounced chiaroscuro, while the surrounding painted fields introduce abstracted atmospheric or architectural elements.

The compositions frequently juxtapose sharply defined figures against expansive, non-naturalistic backgrounds, creating a tension between realism and abstraction. Framing motifs such as portals, windows, or geometric enclosures recur, suggesting conceptual boundaries between interior and exterior space. These works anticipate Hornak's later interest in photographic mediation while maintaining drawing as the primary structural foundation of the image.

Landscape paintings 1970–1985

From approximately 1970 through 1985, landscape became the central focus of Hornak's work. Although often associated with Photorealism due to his reliance on photographic source material, these landscapes diverge from the descriptive neutrality commonly associated with the movement. Hornak used photography not as a means of literal transcription but as a compositional and temporal tool, synthesizing multiple photographic exposures into unified painted images.

In these works, Hornak adapted the logic of multiple exposure photography into painting, layering shifts in light, atmosphere, and cloud formation within carefully organized compositions. Rather than presenting a single fixed moment, the landscapes suggest duration and instability, as if several temporal states coexist within the same pictorial field. This approach introduced a temporal dimension uncommon within early Photorealism and aligned Hornak's practice with longer traditions of landscape painting concerned with the sublime and metaphysical experience.

Visually, the landscapes are characterized by heightened chromatic intensity and dramatic atmospheric effects. Skies frequently dominate the compositions, rendered with saturated color and strong contrasts between illumination and shadow. Trees, water, and terrain appear with precise clarity yet are often silhouetted or positioned against turbulent skies, producing a tension between stillness and implied movement. While grounded in observed environments, the resulting scenes resist precise geographic identification and instead function as psychologically inflected landscapes.

Hornak's landscape paintings reflect an engagement with nineteenth-century German Romanticism, particularly the work of Caspar David Friedrich, evident in the use of silhouetted forms, expansive skies, and contemplative distance. At the same time, Hornak emphasized classical compositional organization, aligning his approach with painters such as Nicolas Poussin and Paul Cézanne. Horizon lines are carefully calibrated, spatial recession is clearly articulated, and compositional rhythms guide visual movement through the image, an approach Hornak likened to musical structure.

Dark interlude paintings 1985

In 1985, Hornak produced a short but distinct group of landscape paintings that mark a transitional moment within his broader landscape practice. These works are characterized by darker tonal ranges, fractured illumination, and heightened atmospheric instability. Storm systems, lightning, and unsettled horizons recur as compositional elements, introducing a more overtly dramatic register than in his earlier landscapes.

While the paintings retain the compositional discipline and structural clarity evident throughout Hornak's work, critics noted a pronounced shift in mood and emphasis. The imagery's turbulent skies, abrupt contrasts of light and shadow, and sense of suspended equilibrium led some commentators to describe the works as carrying an apocalyptic undercurrent, in which natural forces appear intensified and destabilized. Rather than depicting specific events, the paintings evoke a broader atmosphere of disruption and transition.

Formally, these works exhibit a loosening of surface control relative to Hornak's earlier landscapes. Brushwork becomes more expressive, particularly in the handling of clouds and atmospheric effects, while the palette shifts toward cooler blues, purples, and slate grays punctuated by flashes of illumination. Although limited in number, this group of paintings functions as a pivotal passage between Hornak's sustained landscape investigations and his subsequent focus on botanical and still life imagery.

Botanical and still life paintings 1986–2002

Beginning in the mid-1980s and continuing until his death in 2002, Hornak entered a prolonged mature phase centered on botanical and still life painting. While informed by Dutch and Flemish Golden Age traditions, these works do not function as historical pastiche. Instead, Hornak employed the still life genre as a contemporary framework for exploring compositional complexity, symbolic ambiguity, and perceptual intensity.

The botanical paintings are marked by high levels of technical refinement and saturated color. Flowers, foliage, fruit, birds, insects, and other natural elements are rendered with near microscopic clarity, yet arranged in compositions that resist traditional still life stability. Rather than being confined to shallow spatial settings, forms expand outward, interlace, and overlap in dense, architectonic structures that appear to exceed the boundaries of the picture plane.

Hornak frequently juxtaposed species and elements that would not naturally coexist, collapsing distinctions of climate, season, and scale. Tropical and temperate flora appear together, organic growth is set against mineral or atmospheric elements, and states of bloom and decay unfold simultaneously within the same image. Critics noted that this compression of natural cycles imparted a heightened symbolic charge to the works, likening their visual density and latent tension to fin de siècle imagery and, in some interpretations, to end time or apocalyptic painting traditions, in which beauty and abundance coexist with suggestions of transience and instability.

Spatial ambiguity is central to these works. Backgrounds often dissolve into indeterminate landscapes, celestial skies, or void-like fields of color, undermining conventional distinctions between foreground and distance. Color functions as a primary structural element rather than as decorative effect. Working primarily in acrylics, Hornak favored smooth surfaces over visible texture, intensifying chromatic impact while maintaining compositional restraint.

A defining feature of this period is Hornak's development of painted frames. These consisted of flat wooden borders slightly elevated above the plane of the primary support, across which Hornak extended the painted imagery. This approach integrated structural support and pictorial surface into a unified visual field, reinforcing the sense that the composition extends beyond the central image.

Within the context of Hornak's broader practice, the botanical and still life paintings articulate his sustained engagement with beauty as a serious aesthetic and conceptual concern. While visually lush, the works resist purely decorative readings, instead presenting nature as a site of accumulation, excess, and impermanence, consistent with critical interpretations that emphasize their underlying tension and temporal awareness.

Figurative paintings 1974–1994

Between the mid-1970s and mid-1990s, Hornak intermittently returned to figurative painting, producing a smaller but significant body of work. These paintings integrate the academic rigor of his early figure studies with the compositional maturity of his later practice.

Figures are rendered with anatomical precision and restrained emotional expression, often depicted in seated or contemplative poses. Hornak avoided overt narrative or theatrical gesture, favoring stillness and psychological containment. Spatial settings are simplified interiors or ambiguous architectural environments that function as compositional frameworks rather than descriptive spaces.

Although photographic sources continued to inform these works, Hornak moderated the mechanical qualities often associated with Photorealism. Tonal transitions are softened, edges unified, and surfaces controlled to emphasize pictorial cohesion and psychological presence.

Drawings 1966–1994

Drawing remained foundational to Hornak's practice throughout his career. From 1966 to 1972, he produced an extensive series of complex figurative drawings characterized by dense cross-hatching, layered contours, and tightly organized compositions. These works often compress multiple figures into confined pictorial fields, generating a sense of physical and psychological intensity.

Between approximately 1971 and 1984, Hornak developed a large body of landscape drawings emphasizing tonal gradation, atmosphere, and spatial rhythm. Executed primarily in graphite, these drawings explore light and structural organization rather than topographical specificity and often function as autonomous works.

A smaller group of refined figurative drawings produced between 1972 and 1994 reflects a return to clarity and restraint. These later drawings isolate one or two figures against minimal grounds, emphasizing proportion, gesture, and tonal economy.

Printmaking 1962–1966

Hornak's engagement with printmaking occurred primarily during his academic training and represents the earliest sustained exploration of his artistic vocabulary. The majority of his prints were produced during his undergraduate studies at Wayne State University between 1962 and 1964, with a smaller group of larger-format etchings completed during his graduate studies from 1965 to 1966.

The early etchings are characterized by vigorous linearity, dense cross-hatching, and dramatic contrast. Figures are frequently compressed within tightly bounded compositions, suggesting physical constraint and psychological pressure. Mythic imagery and symbolic motifs recur, reflecting Hornak's early engagement with archetypal subject matter.

The later etchings demonstrate increased compositional control and spatial clarity, balancing dense passages of line with open areas of tone. Although Hornak did not pursue printmaking extensively beyond this period, these works establish formal and conceptual concerns that continued to inform his drawings and paintings.

== Artistic influences ==
Hornak frequently cited nineteenth century landscape traditions as foundational to his artistic development, particularly the painters of the Hudson River School. Among these, he identified Martin Johnson Heade and Frederic Edwin Church as major influences, drawn to their integration of natural observation, atmospheric effect, and symbolic intent. Hornak was especially responsive to the Hudson River School's emphasis on landscape as a constructed and meaningful space rather than a purely descriptive record.

In addition to American landscape painting, Hornak acknowledged the influence of German Romanticism, particularly the work of Caspar David Friedrich. Friedrich's treatment of landscape as a vehicle for introspection and metaphysical reflection resonated with Hornak's belief that representational imagery could sustain psychological and symbolic depth. This influence is reflected in Hornak's attention to spatial depth, horizon structure, and the contemplative framing of natural forms.

Hornak also cited European classical and modern painters as central to his understanding of pictorial organization. He frequently referenced Nicolas Poussin and Paul Cézanne for their disciplined approach to composition and spatial construction. Speaking about these influences, Hornak stated, "What I so like about Poussin and Cézanne is their sense of organization. I like the way in which they develop space and shape in architectural continuity – the rhythm across their paintings. When I paint a landscape, I get the greatest pleasure out of composing it. As I paint, I try to work out a visual sonata form or a fugue, with realistic images". This comparison to musical structure underscores Hornak's conception of painting as an internally ordered system governed by rhythm and balance.

Taken together, Hornak's influences reflect a synthesis of Romantic landscape painting, classical European composition, and Renaissance structure. Rather than aligning himself with a single historical movement, he drew selectively from multiple traditions to develop a representational practice grounded in formal organization, symbolic resonance, and sustained engagement with art historical precedent.

== Critical response ==
In response to Hornak's multiple exposure landscape paintings, John Canaday wrote in The New York Times in 1974, "Mr. Hornak is right at the top of the list of romantically descriptive painters today".

As Hornak was nearing the end of the multiple exposure landscape series, Marcia Corbino wrote in the Sarasota Herald Tribune, "Not since the Hudson River School glorified the grandiose panorama of the natural world in meticulous detail has an American artist embraced landscape painting with the artistic totality of Ian Hornak".

In ARTnews magazine, Gerrit Henry wrote about Hornak's floral and still life paintings, "Hornak is a rather self-explanatory if not wholly tautological postmodernism. Perhaps, though, his excesses ring true for the approaching millennium: this is 'end-time' painting that exercises its romantic license to the fullest in its presentation of multiple styles of the last fin de siècle – naturalist, symbolist, allegorical, apocalyptic".

== Personal life ==
Ian Hornak was closely connected to his family throughout his life. He had a younger sister, Rosemary Hornak, who was also a fine artist and later became the sole beneficiary of his estate, and an older brother, Michael Hornak. Hornak maintained a particularly close relationship with his sister Rosemary and with her son, Eric Ian Hornak-Spoutz, who was named after Hornak. Spoutz later became an art dealer and served as Hornak’s studio manager before ultimately acting as executor of his estate.

Hornak was openly bisexual and lived much of his adult life in long term committed partnerships. From 1970 until 1976, his life partner was Julius Rosenthal Wolf. Wolf was a prominent American casting director, producer, and theatrical agent, as well as an art collector and art dealer. He served as vice president of General Amusement Corporation, then the second largest talent management company in the world. Earlier, during the 1950s and 1960s, Wolf had worked as assistant director of Edith Halpert's Downtown Gallery in New York City, where he developed a professional expertise in American modernism and became an early advocate for its artists.

During their partnership, Hornak and Wolf lived on the Upper East Side of Manhattan and at a weekend residence in East Hampton, New York. East Hampton remained a central place in Hornak's life and work, and he continued to reside there until his own death in 2002. Following Wolf's death in 1976, Hornak later formed a long term partnership with Frank Burton, which continued until Burton's death in 1996.

Wolf's longstanding interest in American Modernist and African American art predated his relationship with Hornak and was shaped by his professional experience at the Downtown Gallery. Over time, Hornak introduced Wolf to the contemporary New York art scene and familiarized him with emerging artists and current trends in visual culture. Together, Hornak and Wolf assembled a substantial art collection reflecting both Wolf's historical interests and Hornak's engagement with contemporary art.

Following Wolf's death in 1976, and in accordance with the wishes of both men, John G. Heimann, acting as executor of Wolf's estate, arranged for the bequest of ninety five artworks to the Hood Museum of Art and the Hopkins Center for the Arts at Dartmouth College, Wolf's alma mater. The donated works included original artworks by David Burliuk, Willard Metcalf, Louis Eilshemius, Arthur Dove, John Marin, Philip Evergood, Marc Chagall, Ben Shahn, Pat Steir, Jose Luis Cuevas, Philome Obin, Larry Rivers, Paul Jenkins, Roy Lichtenstein, Robert Motherwell, Ellsworth Kelly, Leonard Baskin, Robert Indiana, Lee Bontecou, Ad Reinhardt, Jack Youngerman, Stuart Davis, Larry Poons, Lowell Nesbitt, Jacob Lawrence, Marisol Escobar, Joe Brainard, and Fairfield Porter.

The bequest also included a small group of intimate paintings and drawings by Hornak himself that he had gifted to Wolf during their relationship. Among these works is a large portrait titled Jay Wolf, which Dartmouth College has frequently used as a visual representation of Wolf. The donation, formally titled The Jay Wolf Bequest of Contemporary Art, was exhibited at the Beaumont May Gallery in the Hopkins Center for the Arts from June 24 to August 28, 1977, and is recognized as the most significant bequest of artwork received by Dartmouth College during the 1970s.

== Death and legacy ==
Ian Hornak suffered an aortic aneurysm on November 17, 2002, while working in his studio in East Hampton, New York. He was transported to Southampton Hospital, where emergency surgery was performed to repair the aorta. Despite medical intervention, Hornak died on December 9, 2002, from complications related to the aneurysm.

Hornak's legacy has been sustained through posthumous exhibitions and institutional recognition. In 2011, a traveling retrospective exhibition titled Transparent Barricades: Ian Hornak, A Retrospective, co sponsored by the Ian Hornak Estate, began touring museums throughout the United States. The exhibition examined Hornak’s career across multiple decades to continued through 2015.

In 2013, Hornak’s work was the subject of a solo exhibition at the Board of Governors of the Federal Reserve System in the Eccles Building in Washington, D.C. The exhibition was on view during the Presidential Inauguration of Barack Obama and took place under the sponsorship of the Ben Bernanke administration, underscoring continued institutional interest in Hornak's work.

== Financial art market ==
Hornak's position within the secondary art market has been shaped largely through private transactions and selective auction appearances, reflecting the controlled circulation of his work following his death. Several notable sales during the late 2010s established benchmark prices for different categories of his paintings.

In 2017, Large Orchid Bouquet (1988) was sold in a private transaction conducted in association with the heir of the Ian Hornak estate to the Jay Van Andel family, co owners of Amway, for US$165,000 ($219,168.11 USD, calculated for inflation in 2025). The sale established the highest price paid for a botanical painting by Hornak and represented a significant increase over the work's original sale. The painting had previously been sold in 1989 by the Katharina Rich Perlow Gallery for US$60,000 ($114,654 USD, calculated for inflation in 2025), which at the time marked the highest price paid for any work by the artist.

In 2018, another private transaction involving the heir of the Hornak estate resulted in the sale of Carnival Evening (1985) to the Jay Van Andel family for US$105,000 ($136,641 USD, calculated for inflation in 2025). This transaction set a record for the highest price paid for a landscape painting by Hornak, further reinforcing demand among prominent private collectors for his mature work.

Hornak's auction record was established in 2019, when Homage to Van Huysum (Baroque Flowerpiece with Minerals, A Monkey, and the Milky Way) (1989) was consigned to Heritage Auctions by the estate of Russell Solomon, founder of Tower Records. The painting sold for US$22,500 ($28,833 USD, calculated for inflation in 2025), setting the highest price achieved by a Hornak painting at public auction.

== Museum and public collections ==
Hornak's personal papers and effects entered into the permanent collection of the Smithsonian Institution's Archives of American Art in 2007, with Federal support from the Smithsonian Collections Care and Preservation Fund, administered by the National Collections Program and the Smithsonian Collections Advisory Committee. Additions were made to the Ian Hornak papers at the Archives of American Art collection from the Hornak family in subsequent years. Artwork by Ian Hornak is owned by the permanent collections of the Smithsonian Institution's National Museum of American Art; the Smithsonian Institution's National Museum of American History; the Library of Congress; the Corcoran Gallery of Art; the Detroit Institute of Arts; the Board of Governors of the Federal Reserve System; the Museum of Fine Arts, Boston; the Albrecht-Kemper Museum of Art; the Allen Memorial Art Museum; the Austin Museum of Art; the Barbara Ann Karmanos Cancer Institute; the Canton Museum of Art; the Children's Hospital of Philadelphia; the Hood Museum of Art at Dartmouth College; the Detroit Historical Museum; the Flint Institute of Arts; the Forest Lawn Museum; Galleria Internazionale; The George Washington University Art Galleries; Guild Hall; the Children's Hospital Boston (Harvard Medical School affiliate); the Kinsey Institute for Research in Sex, Gender and Reproduction; the Long Island Museum of American Art, History, and Carriages; the National Czech & Slovak Museum & Library; the National Hellenic Museum; the Ringling College of Art and Design; the Rockford Art Museum; the Jane Voorhees Zimmerli Art Museum at Rutgers University; the Florida State Capital; St. Mary's University, Texas; The Art Gallery at the University of Maryland; the University of Texas at San Antonio; the Frances Lehman Loeb Art Center at Vassar College; the Washington County Museum of Fine Arts; and Wayne State University. In 2012, portions of Ian Hornak's papers and personal effects pertaining to his life and career as related to Julius Rosenthal Wolf entered the permanent collection of Rauner Special Collections Library of the Baker-Berry Library at Dartmouth College, which was Wolf's alma mater.
