= Rosemary Hornak =

American visual artist

- Born: February 3, 1951 (age 75); Mount Clemens, Michigan, U.S.
- Education: College for Creative Studies
- Occupation: Visual artist Art Collector Philanthropist
- Relatives: Ian Hornak (brother); Eric Ian Spoutz (son)

Rosemary Hornak (born February 3, 1951) is an American visual artist, known for her late twentieth-century contributions to American Folk Art; art collector; philanthropist; the sister of founding Photorealist and Hyperrealist artist, Ian Hornak; and the mother of art dealer and historian, Eric Ian Spoutz

== Early life, education and family ==
Hornak was born in Mount Clemens, Michigan on February 3, 1951, to Frank Hornak, a gentleman farmer, and formerly a member of the United States Coast Guard; and Rose Hornak (née, Vagich), a homemaker, and formerly the owner of a confectionery in Brooklyn Heights, New York. Both of Rosemary Hornak's parents immigrated to the United States from Slovakia as Nazi tensions arose in Europe in the years preceding World War II. Before her emigration, Rose Hornak, who was American born, was educated in Prague.

Rosemary Hornak had two older siblings, Michael Hornak, and Ian Hornak. Ian Hornak later became a prominent visual artist, one of the founders of the Photorealist and Hyperrealist movements, and a member of the New York School. Rosemary Hornak learned to paint as a child by watching and working alongside her brother Ian at the family farm in Michigan. Ian Hornak later recalled during an interview with Patsy Southgate in The East Hampton Star an idyllic childhood with his sister and described her as his "best friend" in both childhood and adulthood. Hornak graduated from College for Creative Studies in Detroit, Michigan with a degree in Advertising Design in 1978.

== Career ==
Following her brother, Ian Hornak's relocation to New York City in 1968, and his subsequent relocation to the artists colony in East Hampton, New York where he purchased a large home and studio, he and his life-partner, Julius Rosenthal Wolf brought Rosemary Hornak out to their homes in New York City and East Hampton where they introduced her to their milieu which included, Andy Warhol, Alex Katz, Lowell Nesbitt, Claes Oldenburg, Fairfield Porter, Lee Krasner, and Willem de Kooning.

Throughout the 1970s and 1980s, Rosemary Hornak exhibited her artwork in group gallery exhibitions primarily in New York, and Michigan. In 1993, she earned her first New York solo exhibition at the historically prominent Clayton Liberatore Gallery where her work captured the attention of leading New York art critic and craft proponent, Rose Slivka. While Hornak had largely exhibited mostly traditionally rendered landscape and still life paintings up until that point, at her brother Ian Hornak's urging, she chose to debut a series of paintings and pastel drawings that were derived from her exposure to Neo-expressionism in New York and had been quietly created between her studio in Detroit and her brother's studio in East Hampton over a period of many years. Perhaps the most distinctive element of those artworks was the support that they were executed upon—-antique American mirror frames. Slivka wrote in The East Hampton Star, "...the artist paints a lush and magic world of omniscient narural forces, flowers, and birds. Her work is somewhat reminiscent of that of her brother, Ian Hornak, but with a looser softer, freer stroke, and a spiritual, otherworldly, devotional focus that is more connected with outsider art with a folk and religious character." Of Hornak's technique, Slivka observed, "Working in a variety of media, including acrylic, oil, pastel, watercolor, and ink, Ms. Hornak creates a world amplified with mysterious knowledge reflected in explosions of color. Her later works are painted on the mirror sections of old Art Nouveau and Moderne-style dressers. She removes the mirroring and paints on the wood backing, including the frames." Of Hornak's subject matter Slivka stated, "The parrot, it's gamut of color and form exaggerated, is a favorite theme. The artist who lives in Michigan, and often visits the East End, has two parrots of her own. She learns about color, she says, from them." Slivka concluded, "In their recognition of spheres of knowledge apart from human understanding, Ms. Hornak's paintings have an innocence, passion, and obsession of the folk artist.... With an educated knowledge of her tools and materials, Ms. Hornak is nevertheless very much a folk artist, dazzled by the sheer excitement, mystery, and color of the world, and a secret knowledge of birds and flowers. Ultimately she tries to render the visual music of an evolving universe. Her work combines authenticity with corn, and an invincible coupling."

Hornak's artwork is owned by the permanent collections of the Detroit Historical Museum, and within the Ian Hornak Papers at the Smithsonian Institution's Archives of American Art.

== Personal life ==
In 1978, Hornak married Carl Spoutz, a Mayflower descendant, and the scion of a commercial real estate development family that was active in the Midwestern and Southwestern United States mostly during the early to middle portion of the twentieth-century. Hornak and Spoutz had one child, Eric Ian Spoutz in 1983, who was his uncle, Ian Hornak's namesake, and later became an art dealer, historian, and executor of his uncle, Ian Hornak's estate. Hornak and Spoutz divorced in 1993.

== Art collection ==
Rosemary Hornak became the sole beneficiary of her brother, Ian Hornak's estate upon his death in 2002, in accordance with his Will. Hornak inherited her brother's real estate holdings in East Hampton, New York; his personal property and effects; his collection of fine art; a collection of his own artwork; and his entire library of intellectual property rights. Her son Eric Ian Spoutz was appointed as executor of his uncle's estate in 2003. In addition to the artwork she inherited from her brother's estate, Hornak amassed a collection of artwork with a focus on American artists active in New York during the second half of the twentieth-century. In addition to her ownership of the largest collection in the world of artworks by Ian Hornak, she is also the owner of the largest collection in the world of artworks by Lowell Nesbitt, to whom she was introduced by her brother in the early 1970s.

== Philanthropy ==
Using both her own personal collection, and many objects from her brother's estate, Hornak has been responsible as majority lender, along with her son as co-curator, of exhibitions at museums and organizations throughout the United States including at Indiana University's Kinsey Institute for Research in Sex, Gender, and Reproduction, the Washington County Museum of Fine Arts, the and the Forest Lawn Museum Museum. In 2013, Hornak loaned a collection of her brother's artwork to Board of Governors of the Federal Reserve System where it was co-curated by her son, and Stephen Bennett Phillips into a major Ian Hornak retrospective placed on display in the Eccles Building on the occasion of Barack Obama's second Presidential Inauguration, with an accompanying monograph written by the co-curators, and published by the Board of Governors of the Federal Reserve Systems. Hornak's collection has been the subject of numerous catalogues and monographs published by museums and American federal government organizations. the Washington County Museum of Fine Arts, the Kinsey Institute, and the Anton Art Center.
