= Andrew Crispo =

American art gallerist and convicted felon (1945–2024)

Andrew John Crispo (April 21, 1945 – February 8, 2024) was an American art dealer and gallery owner based in New York. He later became involved in a number of widely reported legal cases.

== Early life ==
Andrew John Crispo was born in Philadelphia, Pennsylvania, and spent much of his childhood in orphanages and foster homes. Long-form profiles later described his upbringing as unsettled and marked by frequent displacement, with little evidence of sustained parental support. Acquaintances quoted in later reporting suggested that these early circumstances contributed to his pronounced desire for independence, financial security, and social advancement.

Little is documented about Crispo’s formal education. Contemporary accounts generally describe him as largely self-taught, relying on observation, mimicry, and personal relationships rather than structured academic training. By his teenage years, he was living with minimal supervision in Philadelphia and navigating adult social environments at an unusually young age, developing a reputation for social adaptability and resourcefulness.

Several later sources report that during this period Crispo came into contact with Henry McIlhenny, a prominent Philadelphia art patron, philanthropist, and longtime chairman of the board of the Philadelphia Museum of Art. McIlhenny has been described as an early mentor figure who exposed Crispo to modern art and to the social world of collectors and cultural institutions, and who encouraged his ambition to enter the art trade. While accounts vary regarding the depth and duration of the relationship, McIlhenny is consistently cited as one of the earliest influential figures in Crispo’s formative years.

Another early influence identified in contemporaneous reporting was Luigi Darracova, described as Crispo’s astrologist and confidant. In interviews conducted for Vanity Fair, Darracova stated that he had known Crispo since 1965, when he operated a small gallery in Philadelphia. Darracova recalled first encountering him as a young and attentive gallery visitor, already demonstrating an interest in art and an awareness of gallery culture well before establishing himself professionally.

By the early 1960s, Crispo began to distance himself from Philadelphia and the instability of his youth. He relocated to New York City, a move described in later profiles as a deliberate attempt to reinvent himself and escape the constraints of his early life . Those who later reflected on this period characterized Crispo as intent on reshaping his identity and positioning himself within environments that offered access to wealth, culture, and influence.

Together, these early experiences — an institutional childhood, largely self-directed survival, and early exposure to patrons, galleries, and mentors — formed the foundation for Crispo’s later career in the art trade and his ability to navigate elite social and commercial circles despite the absence of traditional credentials.

== Career, and the Andrew Crispo Gallery ==
After relocating to New York City in the 1960s, Andrew Crispo entered the art trade through informal apprenticeships rather than academic or curatorial training. He worked initially as a gofer and assistant for East Side art and antiques dealers, learning the mechanics of the market through observation and personal relationships rather than formal study. By the late 1960s, he had become a regular presence in galleries, auction rooms, and private viewings, positioning himself within the commercial art world through persistence and social fluency.

In 1973, at the age of 28, Crispo opened his own gallery in New York with modest backing from an early collector client. The gallery soon occupied a duplex space spanning two floors at 41 East 57th Street, within the Fuller Building, one of the most important gallery buildings in mid-twentieth-century New York. Contemporary reporting described the space as unusually expansive for a private gallery, with interconnected floors that allowed for large scale exhibitions and private viewing rooms, and later accounts referred to it as a posh, duplex gallery designed to impress high level collectors.

The Fuller Building housed a concentration of leading dealers during this period, and Crispo’s gallery operated alongside those of Pierre Matisse, André Emmerich, Robert Miller, and other prominent midtown dealers, placing it within the core commercial network of postwar American and European art. Within this environment, the Andrew Crispo Gallery developed a reputation not only for private transactions but also for staging ambitious, historically framed exhibitions.

The gallery mounted a number of exhibitions that later appeared in museum, auction, and institutional provenance records, reflecting their lasting scholarly and market relevance. Among the most frequently cited were Pioneers of American Abstraction (1973), an exhibition that examined early twentieth century American modernism and marked Crispo’s emergence as a serious dealer; Ten Americans: Avery, Burchfield, Demuth, Dove, Homer, Hopper, Marin, Prendergast, Sargent, Wyeth (1974), a survey drawing together canonical figures of American art; and Twelve Americans: Masters of Collage (1977), which placed modern and contemporary American artists within a broader art historical lineage. Works shown in these exhibitions later entered major private and institutional collections, and auction houses routinely referenced the exhibitions in provenance listings, underscoring their significance.

Crispo represented or dealt extensively in the work of artists associated with American modernism and postwar art, including Edward Hopper, John Marin, Marsden Hartley, Arthur Dove, Charles Demuth, and Milton Avery among others. Additionally the gallery represented a stable of contemporary artists including, Douglas Abdell, Richard Anuszkiewicz, Jon Carsman, Michael Clark, Robert Courtright, Nancy Genn, Carl Holty, David Ligare, Roberto Matta, Lowell Nesbitt, I. Rice Pereira, Richard Pousette-Dart, Francesco Scavullo, and Charles Seliger.

A notable feature of the Andrew Crispo Gallery was its prolific publication of exhibition catalogues. These publications were often substantial and profusely illustrated, including essays, artist chronologies, bibliographies, and lists of works held in public collections, and they were intended to position the exhibitions within an art historical framework rather than as purely commercial displays. The catalogues remain cited in archival finding aids and market documentation, reflecting their continued utility as reference material.

Crispo’s professional standing rose dramatically through his relationship with Baron Hans Heinrich von Thyssen Bornemisza, the Swiss industrialist and one of the most important art collectors of the twentieth century. The two met during one of Crispo’s early major exhibitions, at which the Baron purchased multiple works, and the relationship developed into Crispo’s most significant client connection. Following the death in 1977 of Thyssen Bornemisza’s longtime European dealer Franco Reppetti, Crispo increasingly acted as the Baron’s principal dealer, participating in large scale acquisitions and resales involving major works and substantial sums with contemporary accounts suggesting a nearly 90 million (USD) expenditure by Bornemisza with the gallery over the course of his relationship with Crispo.

Contemporary accounts portray this period as the height of Crispo’s influence within the market. Before his association with Thyssen Bornemisza, he had been considered a marginal figure within elite collecting circles; afterward, he operated at a level comparable to the most powerful private dealers of the era. By the early 1980s, however, the relationship deteriorated amid disputes over payments, delivery of works, and financial exposure. In June 1984, Thyssen Bornemisza severed formal ties with Crispo’s gallery, a rupture that contemporaries described as a profound professional and personal blow and which coincided with the rapid decline of Crispo’s business.

== Later years and death ==
In 1989, while Crispo was serving his sentence for tax evasion, his home in The Hamptons suffered a catastrophic explosion due to a natural gas leak. In 1991, a court ordered that the Long Island Lighting Company pay him $7.6 million losses to his home and art collection. He went through bankruptcy proceedings in the late 1990s, while attempting to open a new art gallery, and in 2000, he was sentenced to seven years in prison for extortion, after threatening to kidnap the daughter of a lawyer who had worked on the case; he served five of the seven years.

Following that release, Crispo sought to open another gallery in a space he purchased in a Brooklyn building, but could not raise sufficient funds. By the late 2010s, he was facing additional bankruptcy proceedings and an eviction proceeding for the apartment he resided at in the building. His eviction was suspended from 2020 to 2022, due to a freeze on evictions in New York during the COVID-19 pandemic, and he later filed an appeal against the eviction which was unresolved at the time of his death.

For a time, Crispo owned the historic Pineapple Gate House (known formally as Simmons-Edwards House) in Charleston, South Carolina.

From 2016 to 2018, alleged representatives of Crispo engaged in an extensive online dispute over the provenance of an uncatalogued Picasso sketch bearing a supposed Andrew Crispo gallery label. Crispo's alleged representatives, claiming to speak directly for Crispo, vehemently denied ever having the Picasso in their collection and declared the sketch a fraud. In 2020, art dealer Eric Ian Spoutz appeared on film with Federal Bureau of Investigation Special Agent, and New York Times bestselling author, Robert King Wittman, in a documentary produced by Gabriel Horn titled, Picasso’s Christ, with Spoutz admitting that he had in fact forged the Andrew Crispo Gallery label as part of an earlier fraud scheme for which Spoutz was convicted; however, Spoutz stated that the label was previously affixed to another artwork, unrelated to the artwork that was the present subject in question. Hence, while Spoutz’s clarification put to rest the question of Crispo’s involvement in the provenance, the true origin of the artwork in question, as of 2020, remained unknown.

Crispo died at a nursing home in Brooklyn, New York on February 8, 2024, at the age of 78.

== Legal matters ==
Andrew Crispo became a prominent figure in a series of widely publicized legal cases spanning more than fifteen years. His legal history included a federal tax conviction, a sensational state criminal prosecution, association with one of New York’s most notorious homicide cases of the 1980s, later federal convictions involving threats against court personnel during bankruptcy proceedings, and dramatic civil litigation following the destruction of his Southampton home. Collectively, these matters drew sustained media attention and played a central role in shaping Crispo’s public reputation and the trajectory of his professional life.

=== Federal tax evasion conviction: United States v. Andrew Crispo (1985) ===
Andrew Crispo’s first major criminal conviction arose from a federal investigation into the finances of his art gallery during the early 1980s, when the business was handling large volumes of high-value private art sales. Federal authorities concluded that numerous transactions had been structured or recorded in ways that significantly understated taxable income. The case was prosecuted in the United States District Court for the Southern District of New York, where Crispo pleaded guilty to federal tax fraud in November 1985. Contemporary reporting described the tax loss to the government as ranging from approximately $4 million to as much as $10 million (about $11–28 million in 2025). He was sentenced to five years in federal prison and incarcerated from April 1986 until July 1989, serving time at the Manhattan House of Detention and later at a federal facility near Otisville, New York. During this period, Crispo was represented by Roy Cohn and later Stanley Arkin.

=== Manhattan sexual assault prosecution: People v. Andrew Crispo (1984–1988) ===
While the tax case was unfolding, Crispo faced a highly publicized state prosecution in New York County Supreme Court. In 1984, he was indicted following allegations made by a young man who claimed he had been assaulted during an encounter involving Crispo and others; a pseudonym was used publicly to protect the complainant’s identity. Prosecutors initially charged Crispo with kidnapping, unlawful imprisonment, sodomy, assault, and coercion, stemming from an alleged incident on September 20, 1984, within Crispo’s social and professional orbit. Before trial, Justice Jeffrey M. Atlas dismissed the kidnapping and unlawful-imprisonment counts, narrowing the case to charges of forcible sodomy, second-degree assault, and first-degree coercion. The prosecution was handled by Assistant District Attorney Joel Seidemann, and Crispo was defended by Robert Kasanof, who argued that the encounter was consensual. After a jury trial in 1988, Crispo was acquitted of all remaining charges on October 17, 1988.

=== Rockland County homicide investigation: People v. Bernard LeGeros (1985) ===
In 1985, Crispo became indirectly linked to one of the most notorious homicide cases of the decade: the killing of Eigil Dag Vesti, a Norwegian fashion student studying in New York. Vesti disappeared on February 23, 1985, after socializing with individuals connected to Crispo’s gallery. His body was discovered about a month later in a smokehouse on property owned by Bernard LeGeros, a former gallery employee, in Stony Point, Rockland County. The violent nature of the crime and the circumstances of the discovery drew intense national media coverage. LeGeros was charged with second-degree murder and tried in Rockland County Court. His defense, led by Murray Sprung, argued that LeGeros was psychologically unstable, impaired by drug use, and dominated by Crispo. Although LeGeros implicated Crispo in statements to investigators, Crispo was never charged. He was called to testify at trial but invoked his Fifth Amendment right against self-incrimination. Prosecutors later abandoned a grand jury inquiry into Crispo, citing insufficient corroborated evidence under New York law. On September 26, 1985, LeGeros was convicted and sentenced by Judge Robert Meehan to 25 years to life in prison.

=== Federal extortion and obstruction conviction: United States v. Crispo (2000) ===
Crispo returned to federal court in connection with disputes arising from the administration of his bankruptcy estate. By the late 1990s, his finances were under court supervision, and a bankruptcy trustee and associated law firm controlled reimbursements for his living expenses. The case arose from a dispute over a reimbursement check of approximately $2,366 (about $4,000 in 2025). In May 1999, Crispo made statements to a paralegal at the trustee’s law firm indicating that he had photographs of the young daughter of an attorney involved in the bankruptcy matter, knew where the child played, and intended to kidnap her. The attorney referenced was Sandy Mayerson. Crispo was arrested on May 24, 1999, and tried in the United States District Court for the Southern District of New York. In 2000, a jury convicted him of attempted extortion under the Hobbs Act and attempted obstruction of justice. He also pleaded guilty to possession of crack cocaine. The trial court sentenced him to concurrent prison terms, including 85 months on the extortion and obstruction counts. The Second Circuit largely affirmed the convictions.

=== Tax and bankruptcy litigation involving Andrew Crispo Gallery, Inc. (1994–1996) ===
Following Crispo’s criminal tax conviction, his gallery became the subject of extensive civil tax litigation. In Andrew Crispo Gallery, Inc. v. Commissioner of Internal Revenue, federal courts examined disputes arising from the IRS’s seizure of gallery assets and the tax treatment of proceeds from their sale. The Second Circuit described how seized artworks were sold through Sotheby’s and applied toward outstanding tax liabilities. The gallery challenged the assessments, but decisions issued in 1994 and 1996 rejected those arguments and documented the financial collapse of the business. The disputed tax liabilities were in the multi-million-dollar range.

=== Civil litigation over Southampton house explosion: Crispo v. Long Island Lighting Company (1989–1991) ===
In July 1989, Crispo’s Southampton, New York summer home was destroyed by a powerful explosion that leveled the structure while no one was inside. The blast, which occurred on July 22, 1989, prompted an investigation into possible causes, including a natural gas leak, and was widely reported due to the scale of the destruction and Crispo’s public profile. Crispo and related plaintiffs sued Long Island Lighting Company, alleging failures in gas service or infrastructure. The case reached the Appellate Division of the Supreme Court of New York, First Department, which in 1990 issued a published decision addressing venue and allowing the case to proceed in New York County. Later reporting described the resolution as involving a substantial, multi-million-dollar recovery, although published decisions focus primarily on procedural issues rather than the precise terms.
