= Katharina Rich Perlow Gallery =

Art gallery in Manhattan, New York

Coordinates: 40.77934°N 73.95963°W

- Established: 1985
- Location: 40 East 84th Street; New York, New York 10028; United States
- Director: Katharina Rich Perlow

The Katharina Rich Perlow Gallery is an art gallery in New York City that was involved in the New York art market of the 1980s and 1990s.

The gallery was founded by Katharina Rich Perlow on New York's Upper East Side in 1985, moved to SoHo in 1988, and relocated to the Fuller Building in 1999. Throughout its history, the gallery mounted solo exhibitions for many American artists including Milton Avery, Sally Michel Avery, Robert Goodnough, John Ferren, Ian Hornak, and Irving Kriesberg, among others. Frequently included in group exhibitions were artworks by Jackson Pollock, Alfonso Ossorio, Milton Resnick and Helen Frankenthaler.

Today the company continues to be operated by Katharina Rich Perlow, although no longer curates exhibitions and is operated as a private fine art brokerage, located at 40 East 84th Street, New York, New York 10028.
