= Irving Kriesberg =

American painter, sculptor, educator, author, and filmmaker

- Kriesberg in his studio c. 1997
- Born: March 13, 1919; Chicago
- Died: November 11, 2009 (aged 90); New York City
- Known for: American Figurative Expressionism

Irving Kriesberg (March 13, 1919 – November 11, 2009) was an American painter, sculptor, educator, author, and filmmaker, whose work combined elements of Abstract Expressionism with representational human, animal, and humanoid forms. Because Kriesberg blended formalist elements with figurative forms he is often considered to be a Figurative Expressionist.

== Early life and education ==
Irving Kriesberg was born March 13, 1919, in Chicago, Illinois. His parents were Bessie and Max Kriesberg. Kriesberg had three brothers, Lee (born in 1915), Martin (born in 1917), and Louis (born in 1926).

As a child, Kriesberg filled sketchbooks with images of animals inspired by visits to Chicago's Field Museum of Natural History with his brother Martin. He graduated from Von Steuben High School in 1937 and studied at the School of the Art Institute of Chicago, where he received his BFA in 1941. His teachers at the School of the Art Institute included the Russian-American avant-garde painter, Boris Anisfeld.

== Career ==
Shortly after graduation from the School of the Art Institute of Chicago, Kriesberg traveled to Mexico City, where he lived and worked from 1941 until 1944. He studied graphic arts at the Escuela Nacional de Artes Plasticas, Mexico City and exhibited with Taller de Gráfica Popular. In 1945, Kriesberg moved to New York City and got a job animating signs in Times Square with Artkraft Strauss.

Kriesberg befriended the Cubist sculptor, Jacques Lipchitz, who introduced Kriesberg's work to Curt Valentin. Valentin, a German-Jewish art dealer, ran an eponymous art gallery on 32 east 57th Street in Manhattan, which was known for exhibiting the work of established modern artists including Pablo Picasso, Alexander Calder, Max Beckmann, and Henry Moore. Valentin exhibited Kriesberg's work as part of a group exhibition in 1953 alongside Reg Butler, Bruno Cassina, Jan Cox, and Alton Pickens. Kriesberg had his first solo exhibition at the Curt Valentin Gallery in 1955. Lipchitz wrote the introductory text for the exhibition catalogue.

Kriesberg had his first major museum show in 1952, when several of his paintings were selected by Dorothy Miller, curator of the Museum of Modern Art, for the landmark group exhibition, 15 Americans.15 Americans also included Jackson Pollock, Clyfford Still, Mark Rothko, Williams Baziotes, Edward Corbett, Edwin Dickinson, Herbert Ferber, Joseph Glasco, Herbert Katzman, Frederick Kiesler, Richard Lippold, Herman Rose, Bradley Walker Tomlin, and Thomas Wilfred. In 1961, Kriesberg had a solo exhibition at the Jewish Museum. The exhibition was a 15 year career retrospective for Kriesberg, featuring works from 1945 through 1960, as well as the debut screening of Kriesberg's 1954 animated film, Pastoral. The exhibition at the Jewish Museum ran concurrent with a solo exhibition at Graham Gallery. Allan Kaprow wrote the essay for the Graham Gallery show catalogue, stating that "Irving Kriesberg has pushed the boundaries of his art farther than most artists. He has increased the possibilities for us all."

In 1965, Kriesberg received a Fulbright Fellowship to travel to India. He traveled the countryside and made a significant body of paintings on canvas and paper in Simla. In 1966, Kriesberg presented this work in a 1966 solo exhibition at the Kumar Gallery in New Delhi.

Kriesberg taught at several academic institutions including: Parsons School of Design, New York City (1955 - 1961), Pratt Institute, NY (1961 - 1972), Yale University (1962 - 1969), City University of New York (1969 - 1972), State University, NY (1972 - 1976), and Columbia University (1977 - 1978).

== Artwork ==
In addition to painting, printmaking and, sculpture, Kriesberg was involved with cinematography. He created two avant-garde animations Pastoral (1954, 20 minutes, 16mm film with musical score by Douglas Townsend) and Out of Into (1972, 17 min, 16 mm film with an electric score by Bülent Arel). He received his M.A. in film from New York University in 1972.

Out of Into premiered at the Solomon R. Guggenheim museum during the exhibition 10 Independents. The exhibition was the museum's first artist initiated and organized exhibition. Kriesberg was an exhibiting artist, as well as the curator of the exhibition which also featured, Romare Bearden, Robert Beauchamp, Mary Frank, Red Grooms, Lester Johnson, Joseph Kurhajec, Maryan (Maryan S. Maryan), Peter Schumann, and H.C. Westermann.

Kriesberg also created several works of public art, including a banner for the 1989 Passover Peace Coalition rally and a 40-foot banner called Peace Dove, which was an integral visual element of the June 12th Rally for nuclear disarmament in 1982.

== Selected solo exhibitions ==
Kriesberg canvas featured in Tashilha

- 1946 The Art Institute of Chicago (First public exhibition; 2 person show)
- 1954: St. Louis Art Museum, The Detroit Institute of Arts
- 1955: Curt Valentin Gallery, NYC
- 1961: Graham Gallery, NYC
- 1961: The Jewish Museum, NYC
- 1966: Kumar Gallery, Delhi, India
- 1967: Yale University, New Haven, CT
- 1978, 80, 82: Terry Dintenfass, Inc., NYC
- 1979: Fairweather–Hardin Gallery, Chicago, IL
- 1980, 81: Brandeis University, Waltham, MA
- 1980: Everson Museum of Art, Syracuse, NY; Galerie Elizabeth, Chicago, IL
- 1981: Fiedler Gallery, Washington, D.C.
- 1981, 83: Jack Gallery, NYC
- 1982: Washington University in St. Louis; Zenith Gallery, Pittsburgh, PA
- 1985, 87: Graham Modern Gallery, NYC
- 1990: Scheele Gallery, Cleveland, OH
- 1992, 94: Katherina Rich Perlow Gallery, NYC
- 1996, 2005: Peter Findlay Gallery, NYC
- 2005, 08: Lori Bookstein Fine Art, NYC
- 2012: Longview Museum of Fine Art, Longview, Texas
- 2018: Galerie Grand Siècle, Taipei City, Taiwan

== Selected group exhibitions ==
- 1946: The Art Institute of Chicago
- 1951: New Talent Exhibition: Di Spirito; Kriesberg; Mintz, Museum of Modern Art
- 1952: 15 Americans, Museum of Modern Art
- 1953: The Detroit Institute of Arts
- 1953: Curt Valentin Gallery, New York City
- 1954: St. Louis Art Museum, St. Louis, MO
- 1968: Directions I: Options, Milwaukee Art Center, Milwaukee, WI
- 1969: Human Concern/Personal Torment, (Curated by Robert Doty) The Whitney Museum of American Art, New York, NY
- 1972: Ten Independents, Solomon R. Guggenheim Museum, New York City
- 1979: Artists 100 Years: Alumni of The School of the Art Institute of Chicago, IL, (Curated by Katharine Kuh ) Art Institute of Chicago, Chicago, IL
- 1982: Peaceable Kingdom: Animal Art from the Permanent Collection, Weatherspoon Art Museum, Greensboro, NC
- 1984: Emotional Impact: New York School Figurative Expressionism (curated by April Kingsley) Traveled to: Anchorage Historical and Fine Arts Museum, Anchorage, AK, December 1, 1984 – January 12, 1985; Museum of Art, Inc., Ft. Lauderdale, FL, February 1–April 1, 1985; University Gallery, University of Florida, Gainesville, FL, September 1–September 29, 1985 Oklahoma Museum of Art, Oklahoma City, OK, January 19–March 2, 1986; Beaumont Art Center, Beaumont, TX, March 28–May 11, 1986; Laguna Gloria Art Museum, Austin, TX, May 23–July 6, 1986
- 1987: The Interior Self: Three Generations of Expressionist Painters View the Human Image, Montclair Art Museum, Montclair, N.J.
- 2016: Curators at Work VI, Muscarelle Museum of Art, Williamsburg, VA.
- 2020: Off the Wall, Anita Shapolsky Gallery, New York, NY.
- 2021: Imagografías de diversidad: el entre-medio de la cultura, Museo Mural Diego Rivera, Mexico City, Mexico.

== Awards ==
Kriesberg received a Ford Foundation grant in 1965, the John Simon Guggenheim Foundation Memorial Award in 1976, a Fulbright Fellowship from 1965-1966, a National Endowment for the Arts Award in 1981, and a Lee Krasner Award from the Pollock-Krasner Foundation for a lifetime of achievement in 2002.

In 1992, he was elected into the National Academy of Design as an Associate member, and became a full Academician in 1994.

== Museum collections ==
Kriesberg's paintings are held in the permanent collection of over 74 American art museums including, the Museum of Modern Art, the Whitney Museum of American Art, the Corcoran Gallery, the Brooklyn Museum, the Detroit Institute of Art, the Eli and Edythe Broad Art Museum, the National Gallery, the Butler Institute of American Art, the Birmingham Museum of Art, The Jewish Museum, the University of Michigan Museum of Art, the Dayton Art Institute, the Allentown Art Museum, the Boca Raton Museum of Art, the Rose Art Museum, the Kemper Museum of Contemporary Art, the Scottsdale MoCA, the Longview Museum of Fine Arts and the Crocker Art Museum.

== Books written by Irving Kriesberg ==
- Looking at pictures, a guide to intelligent appreciation (Chicago: Center for the Study of Liberal Education for Adults, 1955)
- Art: The Visual Experience (New York: Pitman Publishing Corporation, 1964)
- Working with color: a manual for painters (New York: Prentice Hall, 1986) ISBN 0-442-01303-5
