= March Avery =

American painter

- Born: October 12, 1932 (age 94); New York City, New York, U.S.
- Education: Barnard College
- Known for: Paintings
- Spouse: Philip Cavanaugh
- Children: 1
- Parent(s): Milton Avery and Sally Michel Avery

March Avery (/ˈeɪvəri/; born October 12, 1932) is an American painter.

== Life ==
The daughter of Milton and Sally Michel Avery, March was trained by her father. She grew up around other famous artists such as Mark Rothko, Adolf Gottlieb, Barnett Newman, Byron Browne, and Marsden Hartley. She attended the Little Red School House in New York. She graduated from Barnard College and married Philip Cavanaugh, with whom she has a son named Sean. Her work has been shown at the Brooklyn Museum, Brooklyn, New York; Pennsylvania Academy of the Fine Arts, Philadelphia; New Britain Museum of American Art, Connecticut; and the Chrysler Museum of Art, Norfolk, Virginia. Her work can be found in the collection of the National Gallery of Art in Washington, DC.

== Publication ==
In 2024, London-based publisher Black Dog Press released March Avery: A Life in Color, the first comprehensive monograph of the artist's work featuring around 200 images and texts written by Johanna Fateman, Lynne Tillman, and John Yau.

== Bibliography ==
- 'Artists' Estates Reputations in Trust'. Ed. by Magda Salvesen and Diane Cousineau. (New Jersey: Rutgers University Press, 2005), 150–151.
