= Douglas Abdell =

American sculptor (born 1947)

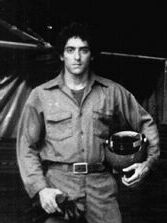
- Douglas Abdell in 1980.
- Born: March 16, 1947 (age 79); Boston, Massachusetts
- Education: Syracuse University
- Known for: Sculpting
- Movement: Bronze Sculpture

Douglas Abdell (born 1947) is an American sculptor, living and working in Málaga, Spain.

== Early life and education ==
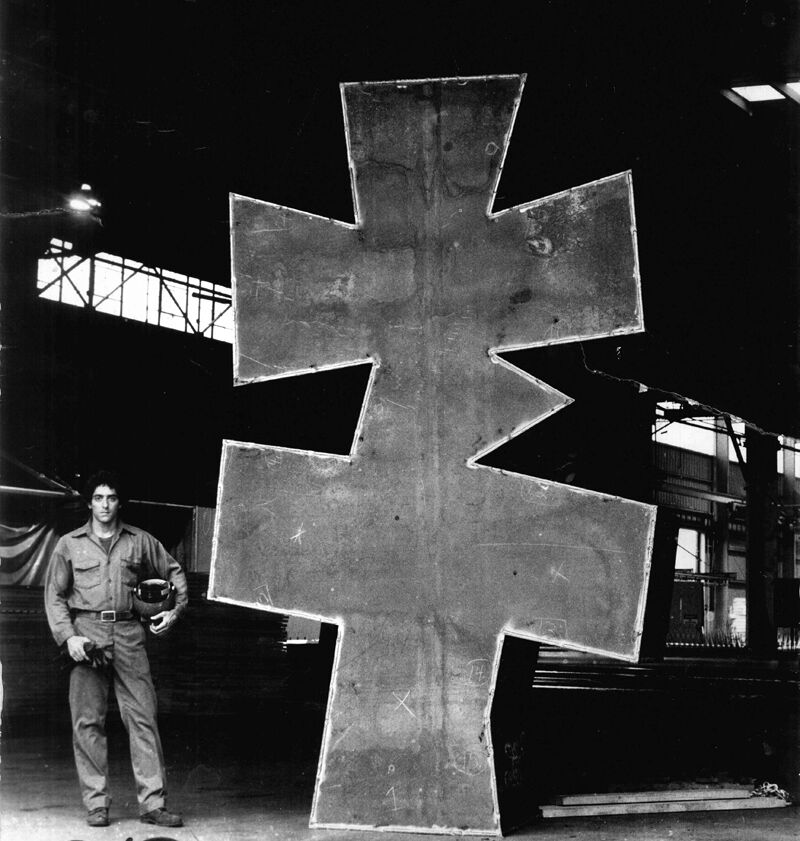
Douglas Abdell in Boston (Massachusetts, 1980) with welded steel sculpture under construction "Qaeau Aekyad #2"

Abdell was born in Boston, Massachusetts in 1947, to parents of Lebanese and Italian origin. In 1970 he graduated from Syracuse University with a bachelor of Fine Arts in sculpture.

== Career ==
Abdell is predominately a sculptor and work with cast and welded bronze, welded steel, and carved stone. In the early eighties he had a period of painting with oil, acrylics and mixed media collage works. In the last 30 years his work has been devoted to political and social themes related to the Mediterranean Countries and their history more specifically Phoenician and Arabic with their specific symbols and languages. The materials of these works are cast bronze, carved stone and etchings. He is currently living and working in Malaga, Spain.

=== Selected exhibitions ===
==== Individual exhibitions ====
- 1971 – Graham Gallery, New York City.
- 1972 – Graham Gallery, New York City.
- 1977 – Andrew Crispo Gallery, New York City.
- 1979 – Andrew Crispo Gallery, New York City.
- 1979 – Park Avenue, New York City, New York.
- 1981 – Amerika Haus Berlin, West Germany.
- 1981 – "Berlín Phoenaes", Mike Steiner Studio Galerie, Berlin, Germany.
- 1981 – Dartmouth College Museum & Galleries Beaumont-May Gallery, Hopkins Center for the Arts, Hanover, New Hampshire.
- 1982 – Andrew Crispo Gallery, New York City.
- 1983 – Gallozzi-La Placa Gallery, New York City.
- 1983 – "Douglas Abdell: New York City Tables", Zero One Gallery, Los Angeles.
- 1985 – Spoleto Festival USA, Charleston, South Carolina.
- 1991 – "La Quarta Guerra Punica", Galleria Massimo Riposati, Roma, Italy.
- 1991 – "La Quarta Guerra Punica", Galleria Agorá, Palermo, Sicilia, Italy.
- 1995 – "La unió dels Estats Fenicis", Pati Llimona, Barcelona, Spain.
- 1996 – "La unió deIs Estats Fenicis" Casal de Vespella de Gaiá Catalunya, Pati Llimona, Barcelona, Spain.
- 1996 – "Abdell, Unión de Los Estados Fenicios" Museo Pablo Gargallo, Zaragoza, Spain.
- 2005 – "Abdell, El retorno del Fenicio" Museo de Adra, Centro de Arte, Adra, Almería, Spain.
- 2017 – "Abdell, El retorno del Fenicio" Museo de Chiclana, Chiclana de la Frontera, Cádiz, Spain.
- 2018 – "Abdell, El retorno del Fenicio" Museum of Cádiz, Cádiz, Spain.
- 2019 – "Abdell, El retorno del Fenicio" Antonio Gala Foundation, Córdoba, Spain.
- 2021 – "Douglas Abdell: Reconstructed Trap House" Ab/Anbar Gallery at Cromwell Place, London.
- 2022 – "Artissima" art fair, session "Back to the Future", Torino, Italia.
- 2022 – "Douglas Abdell: Yads, Phoenaes, Aekyads 1971-1981" - MAMCO, Musée d'Art Moderne et Contemporain, Genève, Switzerland.
- 2024 – "Douglas Abdell: Intervalism and Other Mathematics" Ab/Anbar Gallery, London, United Kingdom.

==== Collective exhibitions ====
- 1978 – "Painting & Sculpture Today" - Contemporary Art Society of the Indianapolis Museum of Art, Newfields, Indianapolis, Indiana.
- 1980 – "Douglas Abdell and Mia Westerlund: Sculpture and Drawings" - Storm King Art Center, Mountainville, New York.
- 1981 – Marisa del Re Gallery, New York City, New York.
- 1983 – "La Scuola di Atene" - XVII Rassegna Internazionale d'Arte di Acireale curated by Achille Bonito Oliva. Acireale and Rome, Italy.
- 1984 – "Written Imagery Unleashed in the 20th Century" - Fine Arts Museum of Long Island, New York, United States.
- 1986 – "Erratici Percorsi" - XIX Rassegna Internazionale d'Arte di Acireale. Palazzo di Città, Acireale, Sicilia, Italia.
- 1987 – "Erratici Percorsi" - XIX Rassegna Internazionale d'Arte di Acireale. Castello Colonna, Genazzano, Roma.
- 1989 – "Artoon: L'influenza del fumetto nelle arti visive del XX secolo" - Palazzo Civiltà del Lavoro, Rome, Italy.
- 1990 – "Art=Money?" - The Gallery, New York City.
- 1991 – "Art=Money?" - Hokin Gallery Miami & Palm Beach, Florida - Ayzenberg Gallery Los Angeles, California.
- 1992 – "Art=Money?" - Massimo Riposati Gallery, Rome, Italy.
- 2020 – "Writing by Drawing. When language seeks its other" - Contemporary Art Center, Geneva, Switzerland.
- 2021 – "Artissima" art fair, Torino, Italia.
- 2021 – "Dimensional: 3D Works from the Figge Collection", Figge Art Museum, Davenport, Iowa.
- 2022 – 3rd Geneva Biennale-Sculpture Garden, Geneva, Switzerland.
- 2023 – "Uncharted Echoes" - Curated by Bartomeu Mari for Ab-Anbar Gallery, London, United Kingdom.
- 2025 – "In Course of Acquisition" - MAMCO Geneva, Museum of Modern and Contemporary Art x artgenève, Palexpo, Geneva, Switzerland.
- 2025 – "HAFLA: A Celebration of Middle Eastern Art" - Sotheby's, London, United Kingdom.
- 2026 – "Art Dubai" special edition art fair, Dubai, United Arab Emirates.

=== Works in museums and public collections ===
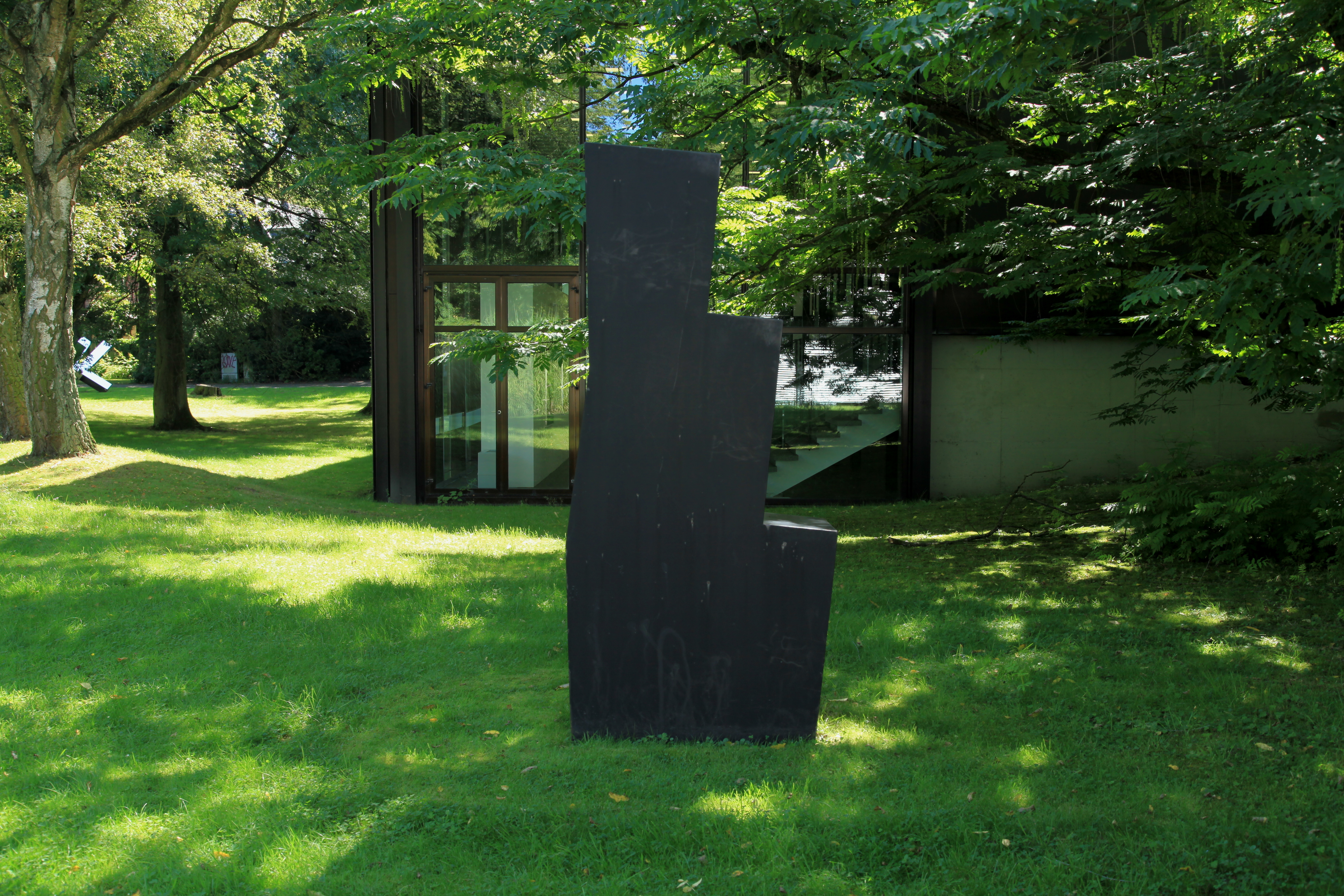
Qurefe Aekyad (1981), in sculpturepark Quadrat Bottrop Moderne Galerie, Germany

- Corcoran Gallery of Art, Washington, D.C.
- H. H. Thyssen-Bornemisza Collection, Lugano, Switzerland.
- Ulrich Museum of Art, Wichita State University, Wichita, Kansas.
- Storm King Art Center, Mountainville, New York.
- Kansas State University, Manhattan, Kansas.
- Fogg Art Museum, Harvard University, Cambridge, Massachusetts.
- Brooklyn Museum, New York City, New York.
- Hood Museum of Art, Dartmouth.
- Mc Nay Art Institute, San Antonio, Texas.
- Wichita Art Museum, Wichita, Kansas.
- University of Notre Dame, Snite Museum of Art, Notre Dame, Indiana.
- Figge Art Museum, Davenport, Iowa.
- John Jay Park, East 76th Street & York Avenue, New York City, New York.
- Ruth and Marvin Sackner Archives, Miami, Florida.
- Tabor College, Hillsboro, Kansas.
- Brandeis University, Rose Art Museum, Waltham, Massachusetts.
- Gibbes Museum of Art, Charleston, South Carolina.
- Quadrat Museum, Bottrop, West Germany.
- Mississippi Museum of Art, Jackson, Mississippi.
- Spencer Museum of Art, University of Kansas, Lawrence, Kansas.
- Stanford University, Stanford California.
- Centre national des arts plastiques, Paris, France.
- MAMCO, Museum of Modern and Contemporary Art, Geneva, Switzerland.
- Barjeel Art Foundation, Sharjah, United Arab Emirates.
- Sursock Museum, Beirut, Lebanon.
- Museion (Bolzano), Museum of Modern and Contemporary Art of Bolzano, Italy.

== Bibliography ==
- John Canaday (1972). "Art: The Sculpture of Upper Volta". The New York Times. New York.
- Swartz, Carolyn (1981). Heavy Metal on Park Avenue. (Film of the installation of three sculptures on Park Avenue). New York City.
- Achille Bonito Oliva (1983). La Scuola di Atene: il sistema dell'arte. Firenze.
- Achille Bonito Oliva (1987). Erratici Percorsi. Roma.
- Lidia Reghini Di Pontremoli (1987). Transavanguardia in mostra ad Acireale - Il cielo scolpito da fasci di luce. Acireale.
- Achille Bonito Oliva (1989). Artoon, L'influenza del fumetto nelle arti visive del XX secolo. (Mostra, Palazzo Civiltà del lavoro, Roma, 1989-1990). Roma.
- Achille Bonito Oliva (1991). Arie. Rassegna internazionale di giovani scultori. Roma.
- Achille Bonito Oliva (1991). Abdell: la quarta guerra punica. Roma.
- Lidia Reghini Di Pontremoli (1998). I segni del fenicio. Roma.
