= Julius Rosenthal Wolf =

American casting director (1929–1976)

- Born: 1929; Cincinnati, Ohio, US
- Died: 1976 (aged 46–47); New York City, US
- Education: Dartmouth College
- Occupations: Casting director, producer, theatrical agent, art dealer
- Relatives: Ian Hornak, (life partner); Eric Ian Spoutz, (nephew).

Julius Rosenthal Wolf (1929–1976) was an American casting director, producer, theatrical agent, art collector, art dealer, and the vice president of General Amusement Corporation, then the second largest talent management agency in the world.

== Early life, family, education ==
Wolf was born in Cincinnati, Ohio in 1929 to Flora Therese Rosenthal Wolf and Jack M. Wolf, president of M. H. Shiman and Co. Inc., a jewelry manufacturer in Cincinnati and New York City. He graduated from Walnut Hills High School and later with a major in English from Dartmouth College in 1951 where served as the editor of the Dartmouth Jack-O-Lantern, and the college's yearbook, "The Aegis".

== Career ==
In the autumn of 1951, Wolf moved to New York City. From 1951 to 1962, he worked in publishing, public relations, and advertising. During that time he was also the assistant director of Edith Halpert's Downtown Gallery in New York City where he developed relationships with many American Modernist masters that the gallery represented.

From 1962 to 1968, Wolf served in various capacities with the second largest talent agency in the world, General Artists Corporation, ultimately becoming the agency's vice president. During his time with GAC, he became known as an early champion of African American talent in the film and theater industries.

Moving into the casting business in 1968, he cast actress Susan Sarandon in one of her earliest made-for-television movies, F. Scott Fitzgerald and 'The Last of the Belles' (1974).

Throughout his career, Wolf was also a consultant for the American Broadcasting Company and the Public Broadcasting Service, for which he cast The Adams Chronicles, Hogan's Goat, and June Moon.

== Death ==
Wolf died of a heart attack at his home on Park Avenue in New York City's Upper East Side on June 11, 1976. John G. Heimann, Comptroller of the Currency under United States President Jimmy Carter, served as the executor of Wolf's estate.

== Personal life ==
Wolf was openly homosexual and his life partner from 1970 to 1976 (the time of Wolf's death) was founding photorealist artist, Ian Hornak. Together, Wolf and Hornak lived at their homes in New York City's Upper East Side and at their weekend home in East Hampton, New York where Hornak continued to live until his own death in 2002.

== Art collection ==
Throughout the 1950s and 1960s, Wolf dedicated himself to the collection of American Modernist and African American art, which he had developed a professional knowledge of during his time as assistant director of The Downtown Gallery. After entering into a relationship with Ian Hornak, Hornak introduced Wolf to the contemporary art scene in New York City and educated him on the current trends in contemporary art. Together, Wolf and Hornak assembled a formidable collection of artwork and upon Wolf's death in 1976, per Wolf and Hornak's wishes, John G. Heimann delivered a bequeath of the 95 artwork collection to The Hood Museum of Art and The Hopkins Center for the Arts at Wolf's alma mater Dartmouth College. Among the artists whose works are in the collection are David Burliuk, Willard Metcalf, Louis Eilshemius, Arthur Dove, John Marin, Philip Evergood, Marc Chagall, Ben Shahn, Pat Steir, José Luis Cuevas, Philomé Obin, Larry Rivers, Paul Jenkins, Roy Lichtenstein, Robert Motherwell, Ellsworth Kelly, Leonard Baskin, Robert Indiana, Lee Bontecou, Ad Reinhardt, Jack Youngerman, Stuart Davis, Larry Poons, Lowell Nesbitt, Jacob Lawrence, Marisol, Joe Brainard and Fairfield Porter. The collection also houses a small collection of intimate paintings and drawings by Ian Hornak that Hornak gifted to Wolf including a large portrait of Wolf, titled "Jay Wolf" that Dartmouth College often uses to display Wolf's likeness. The overall collection of artwork which has been dubbed "The Jay Wolf Bequest of Contemporary Art" by the college was exhibited at the Beaumont-May Gallery in The Hopkins Center, Dartmouth College, June 24-August 28, 1977 and is recognized as the most significant bequest of artwork to Dartmouth College during the 1970s.
