= Scott Kahn =

American painter

- Born: February 2, 1946 (age 80); Springfield, Massachusetts, US
- Education: University of Pennsylvania; Rutgers University–New Brunswick
- Occupations: Painter; Printmaker; Sculptor

Scott Kahn (born February 2, 1946) is an American painter, printmaker, draughtsman, and sculptor.

== Early life ==
Scott Kahn was born in Springfield, Massachusetts to Bennett Jordan Kahn, and Anne (née Moss) Kahn. Bennett Kahn was the founding publisher of The Jewish Weekly News, an English-language newspaper for the Jewish community in Western Massachusetts, and Anne Kahn was a homemaker. Bennett Kahn died in 1952 of a heart attack when Scott Kahn was six years old. In 1954, Anne Kahn remarried to Irving Rothchild, the owner of printing company Springfield Offset & Printing Co.

Scott Kahn began kindergarten at a public school in West Springfield, then transferred to a Jewish school in Springfield for approximately a year, before transferring to a public school in West Springfield where he remained until the fourth grade. During his time in school in West Springfield, Kahn received his initial exposure to fine art in art instruction offered at his school. Kahn later recalled his instructor assigning him to draw an imaginary bird which was featured on the class bulletin board for its mastery. When Kahn's mother remarried, the family relocated to the affluent community of Longmeadow, where he attended Converse Street School and remained until beginning junior high school. During that time, he took art classes at the basement of the Springfield Museum. While attending Longmeadow Junior High School, Kahn received lessons in clarinet, violin, and piano.

Kahn began at Longmeadow High School in 1959. During high school, the dynamic of his home life changed, primarily with the relationship with his stepfather, who was unsympathetic to Kahn's creative and social development. Kahn found solace in his neighbor, Cherry Fabe Michelman, an heiress and professor at University of Massachusetts, who encouraged his interest in art, language, and music. In his freshman year, Kahn began art classes at his school as well as extracurricular classes in painting at Baypath Junior College. Later in high school, Kahn and a close friend took adult art classes at the Springfield Museum where he was first exposed to painting from the live female nude model. He also played violin in the high school orchestra, took private piano lessons in downtown Springfield, and attended summer music camp classes at the University of Massachusetts-Amherst where he sang in the chorus and played in the orchestra. Additionally, Kahn took private adult painting classes under a local professional artist in rural Enfield, Connecticut. In his senior year, Kahn was tasked with creating the illustrations for his high school yearbook. He graduated in 1963.

== Education ==
At the encouragement of a maternal uncle who was an alumnus of University of Pennsylvania, Kahn was admitted to the school in 1963. While satisfying the curriculum for Pre-Dentistry, he majored in Fine Arts. In 1967 Kahn was conferred a Bachelor of Arts from University of Pennsylvania College of Arts & Sciences.

Following graduation from University of Pennsylvania, Kahn applied to several graduate fine arts programs and was rejected from each. To fortify his fine arts credentials, Kahn enrolled in Theodoros Stamos’ class at the Art Students League of New York in 1967–1968.

At the conclusion of his class at the Art Students League of New York, Kahn reapplied to graduate fine arts programs and was accepted into multiple. He chose the Master of Fine Arts program at Rutgers University—New Brunswick because of its proximity to New York City. Kahn was conferred a Master of Fine Arts degree from the Mason Gross School of the Arts at Rutgers University—New Brunswick in 1970.

== Career ==
Scott Kahn was under representation for 25 years by the Katharina Rich Perlow Gallery in New York City where he had numerous solo exhibitions. In 2004, a retrospective exhibition of his work was mounted at the Arthur Ross Gallery at the University of Pennsylvania. Kahn has been the recipient of awards from significant organizations including the Pollock-Krasner Foundation in New York City and the Edward Albee Foundation in Montauk, New York.

== Art market ==
On May 25, 2022, a painting by Kahn titled Big House: Homage to America set his world auction record when it sold for $1,439,987 USD at Christie's in Hong Kong surpassing a November 30, 2021 world record for Kahn at Phillips in Hong Kong of US$961,286 for his painting titled Cadman Plaza. Additionally, many paintings by Kahn have sold at auction globally via Bonhams, Christie's, Phillip's, and Sotheby's for in excess of US$500,000. In the gallery retail sector, the Almine Rech Gallery set Kahn's world record with the sale of his painting, The Curtains Parted for US$1,200,000.

== Personal life ==
Kahn had one sibling, Gary Kahn.

In 1975, Edward Albee introduced Kahn to playwright and poet, Frederick Kirwin while Kahn and Kirwin were visiting Albee at the Edward F. Albee Foundation in Montauk, New York. Kahn and Kirwin were married in 2020 in a civil ceremony via Zoom during the COVID-19 pandemic from Kahn's cousin's attic where Kahn and Kirwin then resided in New Rochelle, New York.

== Collections ==
His work is owned by many leading public, corporate and private collections including, the University of Pennsylvania, Dallas Art Museum, Dulles International Airport in Washington D.C., AT&T, Marriott International, J.P. Morgan, MetLife and Philip Morris USA. The Moss-Thorns Gallery of Art at Fort Hays State University owns the largest retrospective collection in the world of limited edition graphic works by Kahn which numbers in excess of sixty objects.
