= Jon Carsman =

American painter

- Born: 1944; Wilkes Barre, Pennsylvania, US
- Died: December 30, 1987 (aged 42–43); New York City
- Education: Wilkes University, New York University
- Known for: Painting, drawing, printmaking

Jon Carsman (1944 – December 30, 1987) was an American painter, draughtsman, and printmaker.

== Early life and education ==
Jon Carsman was born in December 1944 in Wilkes-Barre, Pennsylvania to Jack and Loretta Carsman. By age eight, Carsman's parents approached Niccolo Cortiglia (1893–1982), a local artist and art instructor to provide lessons for their prodigious son. Cortiglia described the young Carsman as having, "golden fingers."

Carsman graduated from Kingston High School. In 1962 he relocated briefly to Detroit, where he attended Wayne State University. He transferred to Wilkes University in 1963, and ultimately earned a Bachelor of Arts degree in Art Education there in 1966. He relocated to New York City and earned a Master of Arts degree in Art Education in 1967 from New York University.

Following his graduation from NYU, Carsman taught in various Harlem schools for the New York City Department of Education.

== Career ==
Following Carsman's graduation from NYU, he was introduced to David Herbert who was a native of Carsman's home region and the American Art director of the Graham Gallery, one of New York's most prestigious galleries. Carsman's work was featured in solo exhibitions and included in group exhibitions at Graham from 1969 to 1974. Later Carsman transferred his representation to the Fischbach Gallery, and finally to the Andrew Crispo Gallery. He also had periodic representation by and solo exhibitions at ACA Galleries, and Hammer Galleries.

== Work ==
At Kingston High School, Carsman received art instruction from local artist, Graydon Mayer who was the chair of the high school's art department. A naturalist painter himself, Mayer allowed Carsman and his other students accompany him on weekends in Wyoming and Susquehanna counties in rural, mountainous Pennsylvania where Carsman received exposure to the topography that later formed the core of the subject matter of his mature work. According to a catalogue for a major posthumous retrospective exhibition of Carsman's work at Wilkes University, "The Carsman family itself had a summer cottage at Harvey's Lake, and the rambling streams and waterfalls along Bowman's Creek, Buttermilk Falls, Hunlock's Creek, and Ricketts Glen were re-formed by his imagination. [Carsman] also found inspiration in the small towns of Edwardsville and Courtdale, uniquely characterized by uphill perspectives frequently [later] found in his [mature] work."

Of his early mature work produced in New York City, the Wilkes University retrospective exhibition catalogue recounts, "From his studio in lower Manhattan [Carsman] completed a series of views of New York City rooftops in the early 1970s, followed by a critically successful exhibition of Harvey's Lake works, then a series of small-town roadways and frame houses in Bucks County and along the Delaware River, later returning to a favorite theme of woodland views. While [Carsman] painted from photographs, his aim was not simply to recreate the scene: “”I want to give you a feel of what it is like to be there when I was.”” Indeed, one commentator found [Carsman’s] work an “interesting synthesis of photographic, art historical and personal resources." These "personal resources" included what has been described as a haunting quality in [Carsman's] work, reminiscent, perhaps, of late-night walks with friends returning home from the Kingston Theater, tranquil summer days with his family at Harvey's Lake, and, in later years, the lush floral surrounds during excursions to the Hamptons, Long Island."

Carsman's final body of work consisted of lush, floral infused paintings, watercolors, and prints. The Wilkes University catalogue described those works and their origins, "A visit around 1980 to Impressionist, Claude Monet's adopted home at Giverny in France inspired [Carsman’s] final major group of paintings. An exhibition of this work traveled to Reading, Pennsylvania, Oklahoma City, and Little Rock, concluding at the Dayton Art Institute in Ohio in September 1984."

== Critical response ==
In a 1973 article about Carsman in The New York Times, John Canaday wrote, "Jon Carsman's paintings…stir a curious double recall of past masters, being remindful at once of Charles Burchfield…. Here are small‐townscapes with anonymous middle‐aged buildings illuminated in the strong lights and lengthy shadows of late sunshine…. But all tonal gradations have been eliminated, so that the scenes become a kind of patchwork, or marquetry, in flat color areas of descriptive shape. …What appears, for a moment, to be a simple reduction from photographic nature is in fact the result of subtle calculation."

== Museum collections ==
In excess of 80 museums in more than 30 states in the United States own Carsman's artwork in their permanent collections, including the National Gallery of Art, Smithsonian American Art Museum; Hirshhorn Museum and Sculpture Garden at the Smithsonian Institution; Metropolitan Museum of Art; Cleveland Museum of Art; Detroit Institute of Arts; Brooklyn Museum; The Newark Museum of Art; Walker Art Center; Huntsville Museum of Art; Akron Art Museum; San Francisco Museum of Modern Art; Phoenix Art Museum; Santa Barbara Museum of Art; Corcoran Gallery of Art; New York University Collection; Baltimore Museum of Art; Denver Art Museum.; Minneapolis Institute of Art; Carnegie Museum of Art.

== Personal life ==
Carsman was married twice, and had one daughter, Daidra Carsman, from his first marriage.

== Death ==
Following a terminal diagnosis, Carsman died by suicide in 1987.
