= George Washington University Art Galleries =

- Location within Washington, D.C.
- Location: Washington, D.C.
- Coordinates: 38.9007°N 77.0463°W
- Type: Art museum
- Public transit access: Foggy Bottom – GWU
- Website: www.gwu.edu/~bradyart

The George Washington University Art Galleries, the Luther W. Brady Art Gallery and the Dimock Gallery, are two university-owned and operated art galleries that showcase the University's permanent art collections, as well as visiting exhibitions. In addition, The George Washington University has myriad galleries showcasing student work throughout its buildings and academic/support facilities. Collections include painting, sculpture, and photographs, ranging from rare historic pieces to Washingtonia and Americana to modern art.

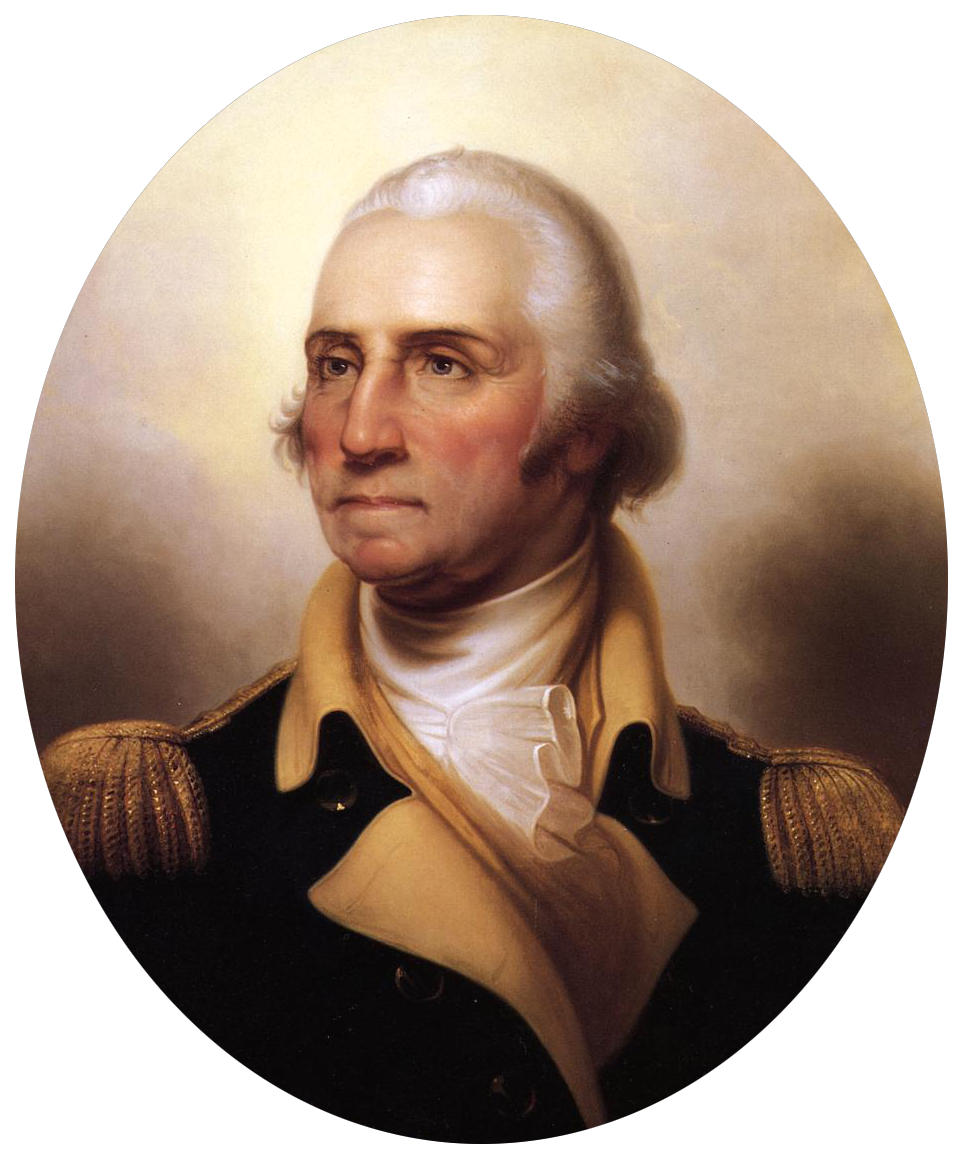
"Portrait of George Washington" (1795–1823), by Rembrandt Peale. Peale is contained in the GWU permanent collection.

The Dimock Gallery was established in 1966 and relocated and renamed for Susan Dimock Catalini in 2001. The Brady Gallery followed in 2002.

== Notable Collections ==
- Henry Bacon, The Boston Boys and General Gage, 1775, Oil on canvas
- Gilbert Stuart, George Washington, 1800, Oil on canvas
- Rembrandt Peale, Porthole Portrait of George Washington, c. 1820, Oil on canvas
