= Sally Michel Avery =

American modernist artist and illustrator (1902-2003)

- Born: Sally Michel; July 27, 1902; Brooklyn, New York, U.S.
- Died: January 9, 2003 (aged 100)
- Education: New York's Arts Students League
- Spouse: Milton Avery (m. 1926; died 1965)
- Children: March Avery

Sally Michel Avery (/ˈeɪvəri/; née Michel; July 27, 1902 – January 9, 2003) was an artist and illustrator who created modernist paintings of abstracted figures, landscapes, and genre scenes capturing personal moments of everyday life. She was the co-creator of the "Avery style", wife and collaborator of artist Milton Avery, and mother of artist March Avery. Throughout their lives, Michel and Avery shared their studio space together, painting side by side, critiquing each other's work, and developing a shared style which includes the use of abstracted subjects, expressionistic color fields, and harmonious but unusual colors juxtapositions. Michel's work is the collections of the Metropolitan Museum of Art, the National Gallery of Art (Corcoran Collection), the Pennsylvania Academy of Fine Arts, the Wadsworth Atheneum, and the Israel Museum, among others.

== Early life ==
Born in Brooklyn, Michel knew from around the time she was five or seven years old that she had the drive and desire to become an artist. She began working immediately as a freelance illustrator after high school creating fashion illustrations for Macy's and was a contributor to the family column Parent and Child in the New York Times Magazine for over twenty years. While working, Michel also took evening classes at New York's Arts Students League.

In 1924 Michel joined her peers in Gloucester, Massachusetts, a relaxing and picturesque locale where she went to focus on developing her artwork outside of illustration. Here, Michel got to know her soon-to-be husband, Milton Avery, who was in awe of her dedication to her art. They married and Avery moved to New York to be with Michel in 1926 where they would eventually live together in the top floor apartment at 294 West 11th Street, Manhattan. Michel served as the primary source of income for their small family from the 1920s-1950s, throughout the Great Depression.

== Career ==
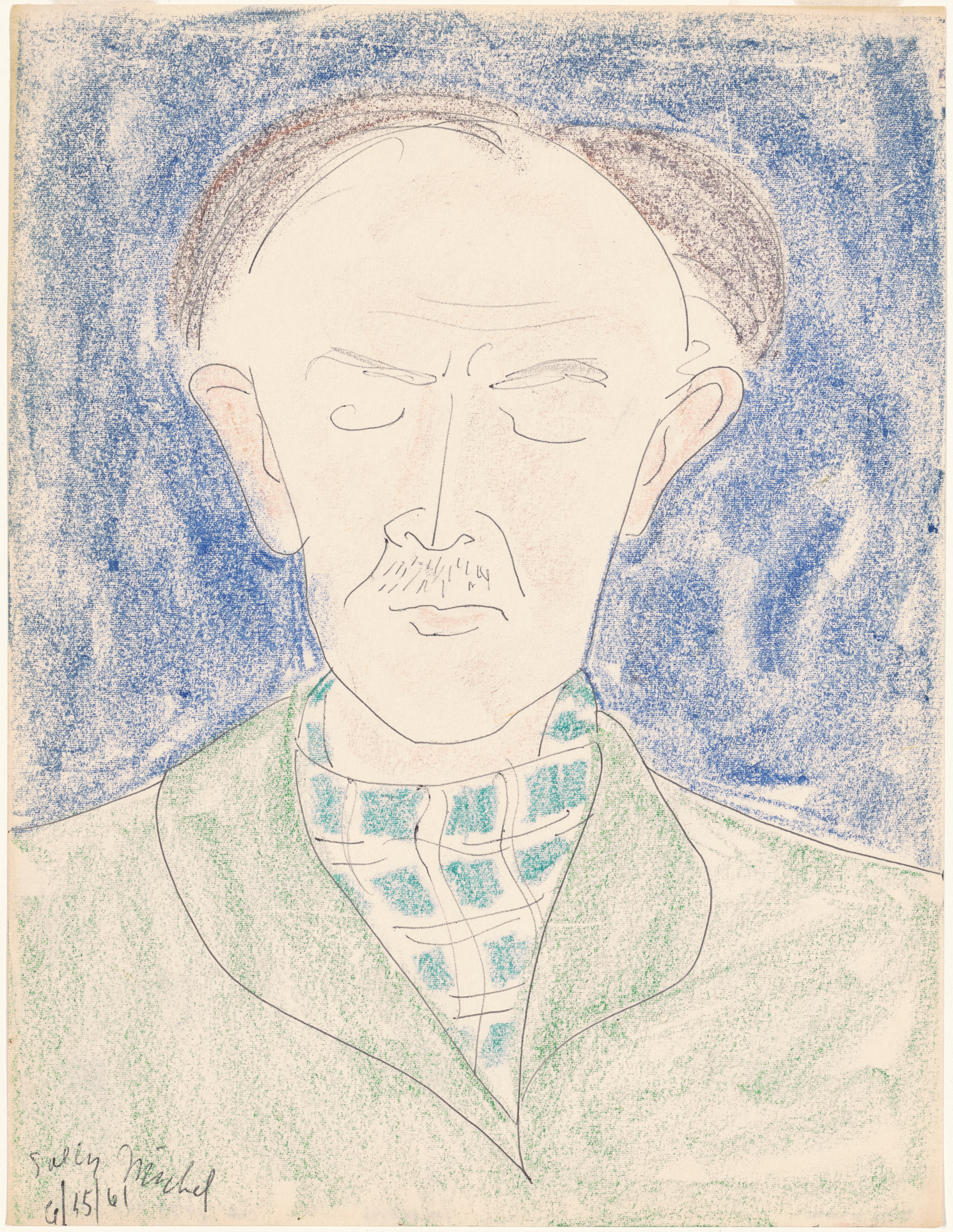
Drawing of Milton Avery by artist Sally Michel, Collection of the National Portrait Gallery

Michel continued to paint in her free time and shared space in the studio alongside her husband, Milton Avery, often working on smaller 18 x 20 inch canvases. The two critiqued one another as they developed what would be known as the Avery style, an artistic reflection on the importance of family and empathy to the hardships of the Great Depression. With Michel's encouragement as Avery's manager, studio mate, and wife, his career took off during the 1950s. Michel and her family chose to travel and paint almost every summer, visiting Massachusetts, Vermont, Florida, Canada, Mexico and Europe.

While Michel was driven to advance her husband's career with curators, collectors, and art dealers, she only showed her own work on rare occasions during her lifetime and often downplayed her own talents. She was considered a colleague, travelled with, and actively participated developing the artistic language of expressionism and figural abstraction through discussions with friends and fellow artists Mark Rothko, Adolph Gottlieb, Barnett Newman, and husband Avery. Michel also visited New York City's galleries each Saturday, acquainting herself and Avery with friends Marsden Hartley, Louis Eilshemius, and Stuart Davis.

== Style and legacy ==
Sally Michel and Milton Avery share a vocabulary of artistic styles that included an interest in the harmony and atmospheric effects of color on abstracted, but familiar subjects.

Michel and Avery were inspired by the American Tonalism movement, American Folk Art of the 1800s, and the art of the avant-garde, especially the "Wild Beast" Fauves Henri Matisse, Raoul Dufy, and Andre Derain. Through mutual respect and personal discussions, The Averys and their style was influential to the development of friends Rothko, Gotlieb, and Newman's styles in Abstract Expressionism.

=== Residencies ===
- Yaddo Colony Fellowship, Saratoga Springs, NY (1955-1956)
- MacDowell Colony Fellowship, Peterborough, NH (1953, 1954,1956)

=== Selected exhibitions ===
- Painting and Sculpture by Wives of Painters and Sculptors, Contemporary Arts Gallery, NY (1933)
- Paul Kessler Gallery, Provincetown, MA (1959)
- Oil Paintings by Sally Michel, Galerie du Jonelle, Palm Springs, CA (1973)
- Waverly Gallery (1981)
- American Masters: Works on Paper from The Corcoran Gallery of Art, Smithsonian Institution Traveling Exhibition Service and The Corcoran Gallery of Art, DC (1986)
- Sally Michel: The Other Avery, University of Iowa Museum of Art, Iowa City, IA (1987-1988)
- American Women Artists: The Twentieth Century, Knoxville Museum of Art, TN (1988 - 1990)
- Seventy-five American Modernists, Corcoran Gallery of Art, DC (1989–90)
- Sally Michel: Mountain Landscapes, The Erpf Catskill Cultural Center, Arkville, NY (1979)
- Sally Michel, Fresno Art Museum, CA, (1990)
- Preserving the Past, Securing the Future: Donations of Art, 1987-1997, National Museum of Women in the Arts, DC. (1997–98)
- Sally Michel: Retrospective, Danforth Museum of Art, Framingham, MA (1999-2000)
- Sally Michel/Milton Avery: A Portrait, Knoedler & Company, NY (2003)
- Sally Michael, D. Wigmore Fine Art (2016)
- Sally Michel Avery: Landscapes and Figures, Anne Loucks Gallery (2018)
- Sally Michel: Idyllic Moments, Childs Gallery (2019)
- Summer with the Averys, Bruce Museum (2019)

=== Selected collections ===
- Metropolitan Museum of Art New York, NY Link to Museum Collection Record -
- National Gallery of Art (Corcoran Collection), Washington, DC Link to Museum Collection Record -
- National Museum of Women in the Arts, Washington, DC
- National Portrait Gallery, Smithsonian Institution, Washington, DC
- Pennsylvania Academy of the Fine Arts, Philadelphia, PA Link to Museum Collection Record -
- Brooklyn Museum, New York, NY
- Chrysler Museum of Art, Norfolk, VA
- Fresno Art Museum, Fresno, CA
- Israel Museum, Jerusalem
- Reading Public Museum, Reading, PA
- Smith College Museum of Art, Northampton, MA
- University of Iowa Stanley Museum of Art, Iowa City, IA
- Wadsworth Atheneum Museum of Art, Hartford, CT
