= General Amusement Corporation =

International talent booking agency

- Company type: Private
- Industry: Talent agency
- Predecessor: Rockwell-O'Keefe Theatrical Agency
- Founded: Early 1930s
- Founders: Thomas G. Rockwell and Francis "Cork" O'Keefe
- Defunct: 1975; 51 years ago
- Fate: Merged into Creative Management Associates in 1968; merged with International Famous Agency in 1975 to form International Creative Management
- Successor: General Artists Corporation
- Key people: Julius Rosenthal Wolf
- Owner: GAC, Inc. (from 1968)

General Amusement Corporation (GAC) was an international talent booking agency dating back to the 1930s. Through a series of acquisitions and mergers, it eventually became one of the agencies that formed International Creative Management in 1975.

== History ==
The company was founded in the early 1930s as a partnership between Thomas G. Rockwell (1901–1958) and Francis "Cork" O'Keefe (1900–1990). It was called the Rockwell-O'Keefe Theatrical Agency. Their clients included Bing Crosby and the newly formed Dorsey Brothers band.

In 1939, when O'Keefe retired, Rockwell reorganized the firm and changed the name to General Amusement Corporation. In the 1940s, GAC's name was changed to General Artists Corporation to avoid confusion with a registered coin-machine company. At that point, the only larger booking firm than GAC was Music Corporation of America (MCA).

Co-founder Rockwell died in 1958. In 1968, GAC merged into Creative Management Associates (with the parent company called "GAC, Inc."). in 1975, it merged with International Famous Agency to form International Creative Management.

== Notable clients ==
- Gordon Anderson
- Glenn Miller
- The Clingers
- Bobby Darin
- Jackie Gleason
- Arthur Godfrey
- Buddy Holly
- Patricia Huston
- Waylon Jennings
- Will Osborne
- Ann Williams

== Notable employees and agents ==
From 1962 to 1968, Julius Rosenthal Wolf served in various capacities with the agency, ultimately becoming the agency's vice president. During his time with GAC, he became known as an early champion of African American talent in the film and theater industries.

Other notable people who worked for GAC over the years included Martin Baum, Sid Bernstein, Stephen Blauner, Sam Cohn, David De Silva, Sandy Gallin, and Mike Medavoy.
