= Anton Art Center =

Building in Mount Clemens, Michigan

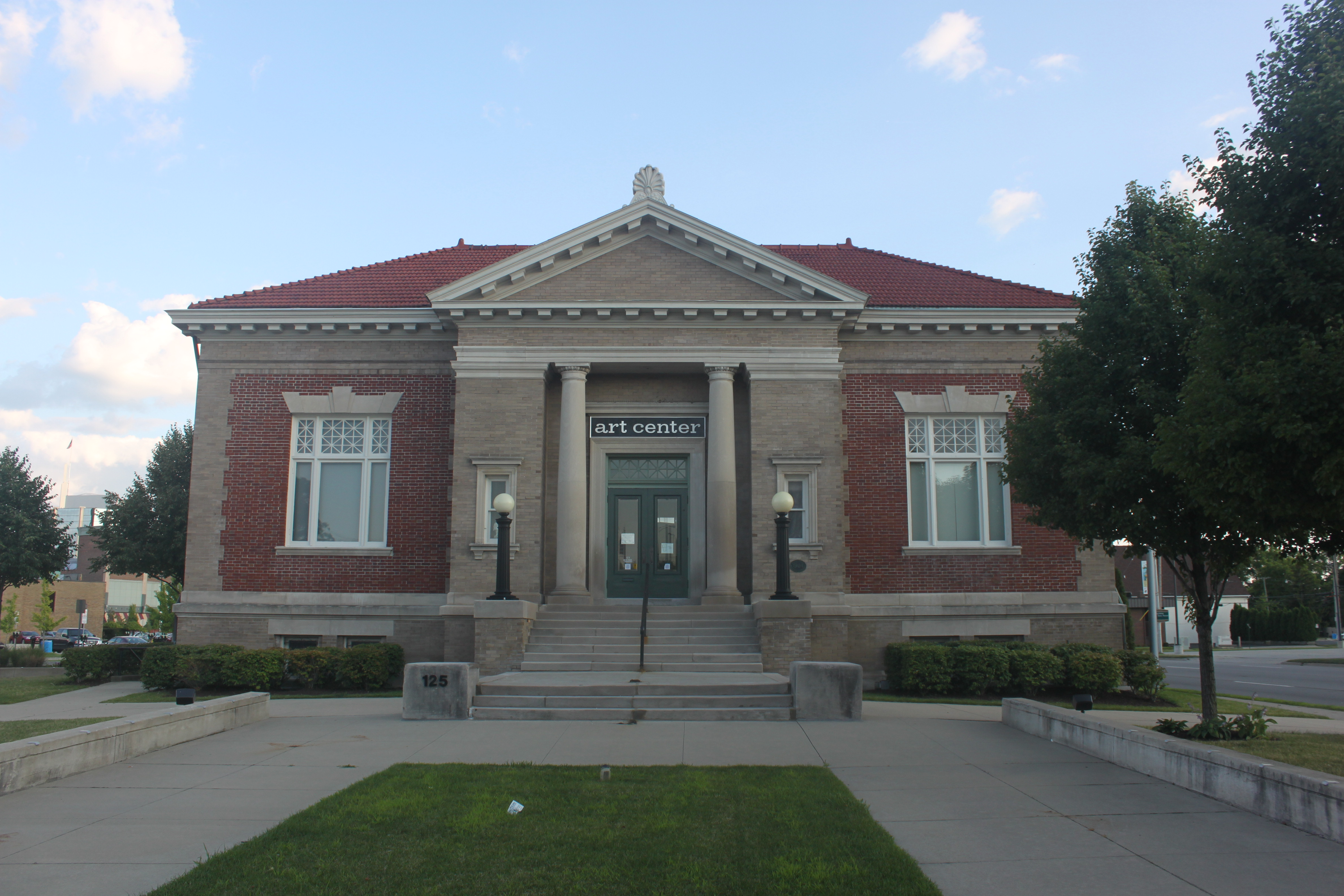
- Established: 1904, 1969
- Location: 125 Macomb Place Mt Clemens, Michigan 48043; United States
- Coordinates: 42.599444°N 82.880278°W
- Director: Phil Gilchrist
- Website: https://www.theartcenter.org
- Mount Clemens Public Library
- U.S. National Register of Historic Places
- Built: 1904
- Architect: Theodore VanDamme
- Architectural style: Neoclassical
- NRHP reference No.: 100007210
- Added to NRHP: December 1, 2021

The Anton Art Center, formerly known as the Carnegie Library, is a Neo-Classical building and Art Center located in Mount Clemens, Michigan, United States. The building was listed on the National Register of Historic Places in 2021.

== History ==
The structure was designed by Theodore VanDamme and was erected in 1904. It was the first library in Macomb County to be financed by industrialist and philanthropist, Andrew Carnegie who contributed $17,000 to its construction and one of 1,681 such structures to be financed by Carnegie in the United States. Although the building typically would have been an adequate size to accommodate the population the size of that of the town of Mount Clemens, because of large tourist industry as a result of the mineral baths that were located in the community, the building was ultimately not large enough to effectively serve its purpose.

In 1969, the Library was moved to a new structure and the original building began use for a not for profit organization known as The Art Center. The structure was listed on the State of Michigan Register of Historic places in 1978. In 2005, The Gebran and Suzanne Anton Foundation of Grosse Pointe, Michigan donated funds to construct an addition to the original structure. The facility was renamed the Anton Art Center.

== Activities and exhibitions ==
The Anton Art Center has been used for exhibitions of local, national and international artists. Art related classes are also offered to the community at the facility. As a result of a collaboration with the Detroit Institute of Arts, artwork from the museum's collection is occasionally loaned to the Anton Art Center for display. Most notably a painting by Vincent van Gogh was displayed at the Art Center in the 1990s.

== Building description ==
The Anton Art Center is a Neoclassical structure built with of variegated red-orange brick, sitting on a raised basement. The façade is symmetrical, dominated by a projecting central portico of buff brick, with Doric columns surmounted by an enclosed pediment. A stone staircase leads to the central entrance. The case buff colored brick is used to clad the basement story, as well as to create a decorative frieze at the top and quoins at the building corners. A heavy cornice with block modillions runs across the top of the façade, wrapping around the sides. The central portico is flanked by tripartite wood windows with limestone sills and splayed limestone lintels with articulated keystones. A 2006 addition is connected to the rear of the 1904 building.

== See also ==
- National Register of Historic Places listings in Macomb County, Michigan
