= Lowell Blair Nesbitt =

American painter

Lowell Nesbitt
- Born: Lowell Blair Nesbitt; October 4, 1933; Baltimore, Maryland, U.S.
- Died: July 8, 1993 (aged 59); New York, New York
- Education: Tyler School of Art, Temple University, Royal College of Art, London
- Known for: Painting, Drawing, Printmaking, Sculpting
- Movement: Realism, Photorealsim

Lowell Blair Nesbitt (October 4, 1933 – July 8, 1993) was an American painter, draughtsman, printmaker, stained glass artist, and sculptor. He served as the official artist for NASA during the Apollo 9 and Apollo 13 space missions. In 1976, the United States Navy commissioned him to create a monumental mural for the administration building on Treasure Island in San Francisco, described at the time as the largest mural in the United States. In 1980, the United States Postal Service issued four postage stamps depicting his paintings.

== Early life and education ==
Lowell Blair Nesbitt was born in Towson, Maryland, to Frank E. Nesbitt and Mildred C. Nesbitt (née Carback). He spent his early years in the Stoneleigh Historic District of Towson, where his family home was located at 708 Stoneleigh Road.

He completed his secondary education at Towson High School in 1951 and subsequently earned a Bachelor of Fine Arts degree from the Tyler School of Art and Architecture at Temple University in Philadelphia, Pennsylvania, in 1955. He continued his formal training through advanced study in stained glass and printmaking at the Royal College of Art in London, England, where he held a fellowship from 1955 to 1956.

Nesbitt enlisted in the United States Army in 1956 and served until 1958. Upon returning to civilian life, he resided in Washington, D.C., where he was employed as a night watchman at The Phillips Collection. In 1963, he relocated permanently to New York City to pursue a full time career as a visual artist.

== Career ==
In 1958 the Baltimore Museum of Art hosted the first solo museum exhibit that Nesbitt was to have in his lengthy career, but it was in 1964 with his debut at the Corcoran Gallery of Art (Museum) in Washington, D.C. that Nesbitt received greater recognition. The array of botanical works most likely would not have been created had it had not been for the beckoning of fellow artist Robert Indiana, who, in 1962, after viewing some of Lowell Nesbitt's abstract paintings drawings and prints, suggested that he attempt to make a conversion from the abstraction which Nesbitt’s career had been focused on pre-1962, to the style of realism.

Nesbitt was often classified as a Photorealist artist, though he fought inclusion with this group of artists throughout his career. Nesbitt established himself as an artist who could employ both diversity of technique and subject matter while creating paintings, drawings and prints using studio interiors, articles of clothing, piles of shoes, x-ray figures (Nesbitt was the first highly recognized artist to use this subject matter since the artists of the New Zealand region unknowingly painted "x-ray style" figures at the early portion of the last millennium), caverns, ruins, landscapes, flowers, groupings of fruits and vegetables, and electronic components (he is credited for being the first artist to use computer parts as subject matter for his artwork). He also used his pet dogs in addition to birds, reptiles, various mammals and the Neoclassical facades of SoHo's 19th century cast-iron buildings and several of Manhattan's major bridges, in addition to a number of series in which he incorporated numerous Victorian staircases, and other interior scenes as subject matter for his artwork. His last series in the 1980s, titled the “impossible series” was a grouping of surrealistic landscapes paintings and drawings.

To honor Nesbitt's contributions to the art world, in 1980, the United States Postal Service issued four stamps based on his floral paintings. He also served as the official artist for the NASA space flights of Apollo 9 and Apollo 13. Nesbitt was found dead in his New York studio in 1993 at the age of 59. Police stated he died of natural causes.

== Homes and studios ==
Lowell Nesbitt was widely known for creating highly distinctive homes and studios that functioned as extensions of his artistic practice. Both his New York City studio building and his later country residence in Carmel, New York, were extensively documented in the New York Times and Architectural Digest reflecting his interest in large scale space, architecture, horticulture, and experimental living environments.

New York City studio building

In the mid 1970s, Nesbitt undertook a major renovation of an 1858 cast iron building in the Meatpacking District of Manhattan’s West Village, converting a former police stable and earlier slaughterhouse into a combined studio, residence, and exhibition space. The building had previously housed coach making operations, and its industrial history remained evident in features such as cattle ramps between floors.

Working with architects Edward S. Knowles and John Immitt and interior designer Mara Palmer, Nesbitt raised the roof of the three story structure, added a fourth floor sunroom, and installed a large central skylight. The renovation took approximately fourteen months and resulted in roughly 12,500 square feet of space. The skylight, constructed by greenhouse specialists Lord and Burnham in collaboration with JAMCO Construction, measured approximately 27 by 27 feet and rose more than fifty feet above the ground floor, making it one of the largest skylights in New York City at the time.

At the center of the building was an indoor swimming pool installed at ground level and surrounded by large scale paintings. Due to city regulations, the pool was limited to a maximum depth of four feet and restricted to personal use. All major mechanical systems were newly installed and largely left exposed, reinforcing the building’s industrial character. Materials from the former stable, including metal stall railings, were recycled as roof deck railings or repurposed as furniture.

The scale of the structure directly supported Nesbitt’s artistic production. He worked on paintings measuring up to thirty five feet in length and often produced works in series that required long, uninterrupted walls for viewing. The building also functioned as an informal gallery space, where Nesbitt occasionally exhibited the work of out of town artists in addition to his own. The interior was densely landscaped with plants and supported by a small staff, reflecting his desire to combine urban living with elements of a natural environment.

Within the broader context of artist led adaptive reuse in Lower Manhattan during the 1960s through early 1980s, Nesbitt’s West Village studio stood out for its scale and degree of integration. Whereas many artists of the period occupied single floor lofts, Nesbitt converted an entire multi story industrial building into a unified working environment encompassing studio space, installation and display walls, storage, exhibition areas, and residential quarters. Architectural features such as the oversized skylight, vertically open interior, and exceptionally long walls were designed specifically to accommodate monumental painting. In this respect, the building anticipated a later pattern among prominent contemporary artists who established expansive urban live work compounds tailored to large scale production and display.

Carmel, New York residence

By the early 1980s, Nesbitt began spending increasing time outside the city and commissioned a second major residence in Carmel, New York, approximately two hours north of Manhattan. The house, named Stoneleigh after the community near Baltimore where he was raised, was situated on twenty eight acres of wooded land overlooking a ravine near the White Pond Reservoir.

Designed by architect Preston Phillips, the Carmel house was conceived as a solar powered retreat emphasizing energy efficiency, compact living, and integration with the natural landscape. Nesbitt instructed that the house be largely energy self sufficient, a decision shaped by the remote site and limited access for conventional fuel delivery. The structure incorporated passive solar systems including a large south facing greenhouse and a Trombe wall, both designed to collect, store, and redistribute heat throughout the house.

The greenhouse also served as a growing environment for tropical plants that Nesbitt photographed and used as source material for his paintings. Heat collected during the day was stored in a rock bed beneath the greenhouse floor and circulated as needed, allowing stable temperatures even in winter. The house achieved partial energy self sufficiency, supplemented by wood burning fireplaces and limited electrical backup.

Stoneleigh was built largely from materials found on site, including stone from the surrounding woods, and cascaded down the hillside on three levels. Interior spaces followed an open plan with minimal partitions, integrating plant life, ponds, and natural rock formations throughout the house. Despite its modest footprint of approximately 1,500 square feet, the use of cathedral ceilings, pocket doors, and cantilevered walkways created a sense of openness. Adjacent to the house was a pyramid shaped studio building that was designed in a similar spirit of energy self sufficiency.

The Carmel residence marked a shift toward a more secluded and environmentally focused lifestyle. While Nesbitt had previously entertained large gatherings in New York City, the country house was intended for solitude and small groups. At the time of its completion, it remained a part time residence, with plans for additional studio space and further renewable energy systems.

== Robert Mapplethorpe scandal ==
In 1989, Lowell Nesbitt became publicly associated with the national controversy surrounding the exhibition Robert Mapplethorpe: The Perfect Moment after the Corcoran Gallery of Art in Washington, D.C., canceled its scheduled presentation amid political pressure and growing debate over public arts funding and obscenity. The decision drew widespread criticism from artists, curators, and museum professionals and led to an organized boycott that disrupted the Corcoran’s exhibition schedule and public standing.

Nesbitt’s involvement was reported prominently in September 1989, when he withdrew the Corcoran from his estate plans in protest of the cancellation. According to The Washington Post, Nesbitt had intended to leave the museum property, artworks, and intellectual property rights valued at more than one million dollars (approximately $2.5 million USD in 2025), a bequest he rescinded following the Corcoran’s actions. Nesbitt stated that his decision was not based on personal allegiance to Mapplethorpe but on what he viewed as a fundamental breach of the museum’s responsibility to defend artistic freedom.

When the Corcoran later issued a public statement expressing regret for having “inadvertently offended” members of the arts community and affirming its support for freedom of artistic expression, Nesbitt responded cautiously. He acknowledged the statement but declined to reinstate the bequest, indicating that the institution’s commitment would need to be demonstrated through future actions rather than declarations. Subsequent reporting noted that Nesbitt’s withdrawal of the bequest was among several tangible consequences of the controversy, which also included resignations, canceled exhibitions, and sustained protests.

Contemporary newspaper coverage situated the Corcoran controversy within a broader national climate of escalating scrutiny of contemporary art. The Mapplethorpe exhibition became a focal point in debates over the National Endowment for the Arts, as members of Congress sought to impose restrictions on funding for work deemed obscene, raising concerns about political interference in cultural institutions.

The implications of the controversy extended beyond Washington. In 1990, the Contemporary Arts Center in Cincinnati and its director were indicted on obscenity charges for exhibiting Mapplethorpe’s photographs, a trial that ended in acquittal and was widely interpreted as a significant affirmation of artistic freedom for museums and curators nationwide. The case reinforced the Mapplethorpe exhibition’s role as a defining episode in late twentieth century debates over freedom of expression in the visual arts.

Within Nesbitt’s biography, the Mapplethorpe scandal stands out as a rare instance of direct public advocacy. By using a planned bequest as leverage, he aligned himself with artists and institutions resisting censorship and underscored the ethical and financial stakes involved when museums yield to external political pressure. Contemporary reporting treated Nesbitt’s action as emblematic of the broader response from the art community, illustrating how disputes over a single exhibition reverberated through questions of institutional independence, donor influence, and the limits of artistic freedom in publicly funded spaces.

== Museum and government collections ==
Lowell Nesbitt’s artwork is owned by hundreds of public collections worldwide. Those collections include, American Embassy art program; The Art Institute of Chicago, Illinois; David Geffen Hall, Lincoln Center, New York, New York; Baltimore Museum of Art, Maryland; Butler Institute of American Art, Youngstown, Ohio; Castle Gandolfo, Rome, Collection of the Vatican Museums; Cleveland Museum of Art, Ohio; Corcoran Gallery of Art, Washington, D.C. (transferred to the National Gallery of Art, Washington D.C.); Dallas Museum of Art, Dallas, Texas; Detroit Institute of Arts, Detroit, Michigan; Ulrich Museum, Wichita State University, Kansas; United States Environmental Protection Agency, Washington, D.C.; Federal Reserve Bank, Baltimore, Maryland; Federal Reserve Bank of Richmond, Virginia; Harvard Art Museums, Harvard University, Cambridge, Mass; Modern Art Museum of Fort Worth, Texas; Goucher College, Baltimore, Maryland; High Museum of Art, Atlanta, Georgia; Hirshhorn Museum and Sculpture Garden, Smithsonian Institution, Washington, D.C.; Hunt Institute for Botanical Documentation, Canegie-Mellon University, Pittsburgh, Pennsylvania; International Monetary Fund, Washington, D.C.; Israel Museum, Jerusalem; John and Mable Ringling Museum of Art, Sarasota, Florida; Museum of Contemporary Art San Diego, La Jolla, California; Library of Congress, Washington, D.C.; Orlando Museum of Art, Florida; Massachusetts Institute of Technology, Boston; Memorial Art Gallery, University of Rochester, New York; Miami-Dade Public Library System, Miami, Florida; Milwaukee Art Museum, Wisconsin; Morris Museum of Art, Morristown, New Jersey; Museum of Modern Art, New York; National Aeronautics and Space Administration, Washington, D.C.; National Gallery of Art, Washington D.C.; American Art Museum, The Smithsonian Institution, Washington, D.C.; Te Papa, Wellington, New Zealand; New York City Center, New York; Oberlin College, Ohio; Oklahoma City Museum of Art, Tulsa; Parrish Art Museum, Southampton, New York; Ludwig Forum für Internationale Kunst, Germany; Philadelphia Museum of Art, Pennsylvania; The Phillips Collection, Washington, D.C.; Centre national des arts plastiques, Paris, France; Renwick Gallery, Smithsonian Institution, Washington D.C.; Saginaw Art Museum, Saginaw, Michigan; San Antonio Museum of Art, Texas; SEB Group, Goteborg, Sweden; Temple University, Philadelphia, Pennsylvania; Thyssen-Bornemisza Museum; Tucson Museum of Art, Arizona; Twelfth Naval District, Treasure Island Museum, San Francisco, CA; United States Department of the Interior, Washington, D.C.; University of Maryland, College Park, Maryland; University of North Texas, Denton, Texas; University of Virginia, Charlottesville; Washington and Lee University, Lexington, Virginia; Worcester Art Museum, Worcester, Massachusetts; and Yale University Art Gallery, Yale University, New Haven, CT.

== Solo exhibitions ==
His solo exhibitions were held in the following galleries (partial listing)—

- Baltimore Museum of Art, Baltimore, MD, 1958
- Corcoran Gallery of Art: Washington D.C., 1964
- Baltimore Museum of Art, Baltimore, MD, 1969
- The Corcoran Gallery of Art, Washington, D.C., 1973
- Museo de Bellas Artes, San Juan, PR, 1974
- The Corcoran Gallery of Art, Washington, D.C., 1975
- Memorial Art Gallery, University of Rochester, NY, 1975
- Hayden, Massachusetts Institute of Technology, Cambridge, MA, 1976
- Navy and Marine Corps Museum, Treasure Island, San Francisco, CA, 1976
- Edwin A. Ulrich Museum of Art, Wichita KS, 1977
- Kent State University, Kent, OH, 1978
- Selby Botanical Gardens, Museum of Botany and the Arts, Sarasota, FL, 1979
- Marion Koogler Mcnay Art Institute, San Antonio, TX, 1980
- The Aldrich Museum of Contemporary Art, Ridgefield, CT, 1980
- Butler Institute of American Art, Youngstown, OH, 1982
- Atlantic Center for the Art, New Smyrna Beach, FL, 1983
- Burpee Art Museum, Rockford, IL, 1983
- Morris Museum of Arts and Sciences, Morristown, NJ, 1983
- Oklahoma Art Center, Oklahoma City, OK, 1983
- Washington and Lee University, Lexington, VA, 1983
- Institute of Contemporary Art, University of Penn., 1983
- Oklahoma Art Center, Oklahoma City, OK, 1984
- Tyler Gallery, Tyler School of Art, Temple University, Philadelphia, PA, 1986
- Tyler Gallery, Tyler School of Art, Temple University, Philadelphia, PA, 1989
- Center for Cultural Arts, Gadsden, AL, 1989

== Selected books and catalogues ==
- Flowers Facades and IBM Machines, Howard Wise Gallery, New York, New York, September/October 1965. Text by Henry Martin.
- Art 1965, New York Worlds Fair, New York, New York, 1965. Text by Brian O’Doherty, statement by artist.
- Interior Spaces, Howard Wise Gallery, New York, New York, 1966. Text by Bill Wilson.
- The Big Drawing, Graham Gallery, New York, New York, April/May 1969. Text by Barbara Kulicke.
- Aspects of New Realism, Milwaukee Art Center, June/August 1969. Contemporary Arts Museum, Houston, September/October 1969; Akron Art Institute, November/December 1969. Text by John Lloyd Taylor.
- The New Painting, Praeger, New York 1969. Text by Kultermann, Udo.
- Lowell Nesbitt, Pyramid Gallery, Washington D.C.
- Lowell Nesbitt, Gallery Ostergren, Malmo, Sweden, January/February 1972. Text by Anders Bergh.
- Lowell Nesbitt, Gallery Fabian Carlson, Goteborg, Sweden, March/April 1972. Text by Anders Bergh.
- Lowell Nesbitt, Gimpel and Hanover Gallery, Zurich, Switzerland, May/June 1972. Text by Udo Kultermann.
- Lowell Nesbitt, Gallery Aronovitsch, Stockholm, Sweden, November 1972. Text by Anders Bergh.
- Radical Realism, Praeger, New York, 1972. Text by Udo Kultermann.
- Hyperrealiste Americain, Galerie Des Quatre Movements, Paris, France 1972.
- Botanical Art and Illustration 1972-1973, The Hunt Institute for Botanical Documentation, Carnegie Mellon University, Pittsburgh, Pennsylvania 1972.
- The Flowers Series 1964-1973, The Corcoran Gallery [Museum] of Art, Washington D.C., April/May 1973. Text by Henry T. Hopkins. Introduction by Roy Slade.
- Hyperrealisme, Paris, France, 1973. Text by Isy Brachot.
- Le Fleurs du Mal, Walton Galleries, San Francisco, California, June 1974. Text by John Pereault.
- Lowell Nesbitt, Museo de Bellas Artes de Puerto Rico, October 1974. Text by Roy Slade.
- Painting and Sculpture Today 1974, Contemporary Art Society of the Indianapolis Museum of Art, Indiana 1974.
- Imagist Realism, Art Museum of the Palm Beach and the Norton Museum of Art, Palm Beach, Florida, December 1974/January 1975. Text by Richard Martin.
- Tokyo International Biennale, "New Image in Painting," Tokyo, Japan 1974.
- The Present Situation of American Art. Text by John Perrault.
- Super Realism: A Critical Anthology, E.P. Dutton & Company, New York 1975. Text by Gregory Babcock.
- Lowell Nesbitt: An Autobiography, ACG, New York, New York, January 1976. Text by Andrew Crispo.
- American 1976: Bicentennial Exhibition, United States Department of the Interior, Washington D.C. 1976.
- Artists Cookbook, Museum of Modern Art, New York, New York, December 1977.
- Modedr med Kunstnere I Weekendavisen, Denmark 1977.
- Lowell Nesbitt: Still Lifes, Andrew Crispo Gallery, New York, New York, March 1978. Text by Andrew Crispo.
- Lowell Nesbitt, Art Contact, Miami, Florida 1978.
- Sneakers, Workman Publishing Company, New York, New York 1978. Text by Samuel Americus Walker.
- Lowell Nesbitt Flowers, 1964–1979, Andrew Crispo Gallery, New York, New York 1979. Text by Andrew Crispo.
- The Bicycle, Museum Boymans-van Beuningen, Rotterdam, Belgium 1977.
- Lowell Nesbitt: A Selection of Paintings and Drawings Since 1963. The Aldrich Museum of Contemporary Art, Ridgefield, Connecticut 1980. Text by Noel Frackman.
- Nesbitt’s Nesbitt’s, Marion Koogler Mcnay Art Institute, San Antonio, Texas 1980.
- New York Gallery Showcase, Oklahoma Art Center, Oklahoma City, 1981.
- Lowell Nesbitt, General Electric Gallery, General Electric Corporate Headquarters, Fairfield, Connecticut.
- Lowell Nesbitt - Works 1964-1971. Onnasch Gallery, Berlin, Germany 1982.
- Lowell Nesbitt, Butler Institute of American Art, Youngstown, Ohio 1982.
- Lowell Nesbitt: An American Realist 1962-1983, Oklahoma Art Center, Oklahoma City 1983. Text by Noel Frackman.
- Reflections: New Conceptions of Nature, Hillwood Art Gallery, May/July 1984.
- Art Collection of the American Embassy Vienna, Austria 1984.
- Art Collection of the American Embassy Brussels, Belgium 1985.
- American Realism: 20th Century Drawings and Watercolor, San Francisco Museum of Modern Art, November/September 1987.

== References and sources ==
- Lowell Nesbitt Repository, Archives of American Art, Smithsonian Institution, Washington, D.C.
- Smith, Roberta (July 10, 1993). "Lowell Nesbitt, a Realist Painter Of Flowers, Is Found Dead at 59". The New York Times.
- Rasky, Susan F. (December 20, 1989). "Corcoran Head Talks About Her Quitting". The New York Times.
- Gamarekian, Barbara (September 20, 1989). "Artists Divided On Corcoran Apology". The New York Times.
- Gamarekian, Barbara (September 18, 1989). "'Tragedy of Errors' Engulfs the Corcoran". The New York Times.
- , “Style; On the Day After, Some Eves to Remember,” New York Times, Enid Nemy, January 1, 1983
- Caldwell, John (November 22, 1981). "Art; Earth Sculpture Inspired by Indian Ceremonies". The New York Times.
- “ART A 'Disturbing' Show of Works by Nesbitt,” New York Times, John Caldwell, November 16, 198-0
- “The Kennedys (Well, Some of Them) Boost a Benefit,” New York Times, Anne-Marie Schiro, June 8, 1978
- “Home Beat; Tale of a Quilt Nesbitt at Bloomie's,” New York Times, Jane Geniesse, June 1, 1978
- “Art: Lowell Nesbitt Tends His Garden,” New York Times, Vivien Raynor, March 24, 1978
- “The Art World Turns to Original Prints as Tax Shelters; Other Uses Involved 'Form of Deferral' Little Cash Down Flood Called Possible Opinions Vary,” New York Times, Grace Glueck, February 5, 1978
- “Studio in a Stable; Studio in a Stable: A Pool and a Trapeze,” New York Times, Joan Kron, May 19, 1977
- “Drawings by Nesbitt, a Retrospective,” New York Times, Hilton Kramer, November 6, 1971
- “Lowell Nesbitt's Photographic Approach; Artist Pays Homage to Jack Mitchell,” New York Times, Hilton Kramer, March 14, 1970
- Johnson, Ken (December 30, 2002). "Ian Hornak, 58, Whose Paintings Were Known for Hyper-Real Look". The New York Times.
- Ian Hornak Repository, Archives of American Art, Smithsonian Institution, Washington, D.C.
- , “Lowell Nesbitt,” Washington Post, July 10, 1993
- “Corcoran Cut From Painter's Will; Lowell Nesbitt's Mapplethorpe Protest,” Washington Post, Judd Tully, September 6, 1989
- “Into the Depths: Exploring the Grottoes and Flora of Lowell Nesbitt,” Washington Post, Meryle Secrest, March 22, 1975
- “Lowell Nesbitt's Flowers At the Corcoran Ball,” Washington Post, April 8, 1973
- “Ex-D.C. Artist Specializes in Photo-Like Studio Paintings,” Washington Post, Paul Richard Washington, October 1, 1967
- , "Lowell Nesbitt (1933-1993): A Comprehensive Retrospective," Absolute Arts, September, 12th, 2003
