= Sue Mengers =

American talent agent (1932–2011)

- Born: Susi Mengers; September 2, 1932; Hamburg, Germany
- Died: October 15, 2011 (aged 79); Beverly Hills, California, U.S.
- Citizenship: American
- Occupation: Talent agent
- Spouse: Jean-Claude Tramont (m. 1973–1996; his death)

Susi Mengers (September 2, 1932 – October 15, 2011) was a talent agent for many filmmakers and actors of the New Hollywood generation of the 1960s, 1970s and early 1980s.

== Early life ==
Mengers was born to a Jewish family in Hamburg, Germany, the daughter of George and Ruth Mengers (née Levy). Several years of birth have been published, and while she was living, reporters stated "she won't say just when" she was born. In 1938, she arrived at age five in New York with her parents on the ship S.S. Koenigstein from Antwerp. Neither of her parents spoke English at the time. Settling in Utica, New York, her father became a traveling salesman. After her father's suicide in a Times Square hotel, she relocated to the Bronx with her mother, who took a job as a bookkeeper.

== Career ==
At 17, Mengers answered an MCA ad for "receptionist, theatrical agency" and entered the talent agency business in 1955 as a receptionist. She also worked for a while as a secretary for freelance theatrical agency Baum & Newborn. Eventually, she was hired as a secretary at the William Morris Agency, a powerhouse in the emerging television industry, where she remained until 1963, when a former Baum & Newborn colleague, Tom Korman, formed his own agency and hired her as a talent agent.

I was a little pisher, a little nothing making $135 a week as a secretary for the William Morris Agency in New York. Well, I looked around and I admired the Morris office and their executives, and I thought: “Gee, what they do isn’t that hard, you know.” And I like the way they live, and I like those expense accounts, and I like the cars. And I used to stay late at the office, just like “All About Eve,” and I suddenly thought: “That beats typing.”

Mengers's first big addition to her books was actress Julie Harris, who was primarily a stage performer. To Mengers' surprise, Harris wanted to appear on an episode of Bonanza. Mengers contacted the producer, who commissioned a specially written episode for Harris. Mengers represented Anthony Perkins, who had not worked in the United States since Psycho (1960). She contacted producer Ray Stark and obtained for Perkins a role in director René Clément's film Is Paris Burning? (1966).

In the late 1960s, Mengers was hired by Creative Management Associates (CMA), a boutique agency owned by Freddie Fields. CMA's clients included Paul Newman, Steve McQueen and Robert Redford. On December 30, 1974, Fields sold the agency to Marvin Josephson's International Famous Agency (IFA); the two companies merged to become International Creative Management (ICM). Mengers represented Candice Bergen, Peter Bogdanovich, Michael Caine, Dyan Cannon, Cher, Joan Collins, Brian De Palma, Faye Dunaway, Bob Fosse, Gene Hackman, Sidney Lumet, Ali MacGraw, Steve McQueen, Mike Nichols, Nick Nolte, Tatum O'Neal, Ryan O'Neal, Burt Reynolds, Cybill Shepherd, Barbra Streisand, Gore Vidal, and Tuesday Weld, among others. Mengers ceased to be Streisand's agent, she told the Los Angeles Times, after a disagreement over Yentl (1983), which gained Oscar nominations but was not a big box-office hit.

On 1 August 1986, she retired from International Creative Management (ICM) when her contract expired and returned to the William Morris Agency for a brief period from 1988-90.

Shortly after the Manson family Tate–LaBianca murders, Mengers reportedly reassured Streisand: "Don't worry, honey, stars aren't being murdered. Only featured players."

== Personal life ==
On May 5, 1973, Mengers married Belgian writer-director Jean-Claude Tramont at a chapel in Big Sur. Barbra Streisand was her maid of honor, and Comte Bruno d'Oncieu was Tramont's best man. Tramont died on December 27, 1996, aged 66, from cancer.

In 1988, after retiring from the talent agency business, for nearly 20 years, Mengers held A-List Hollywood evening salons of 8-12 people that included Jennifer Aniston, Warren Beatty, Annette Bening, Mel Brooks, Graydon Carter, Neil Diamond, Angie Dickinson, Barry Diller, Michael Douglas, Maureen Dowd, Robert Downey Jr., Nora Ephron, Jimmy Fallon, Tina Fey, William Friedkin, David Geffen, Tom Hooper, Anjelica Huston, Elton John, Diane Keaton, Sherry Lansing, Fran Lebowitz, Bryan Lourd, Kelly Lynch, Ali MacGraw, Bill Maher, Princess Margaret, Lorne Michaels, Bette Midler, Jack Nicholson, Ryan Phillippe, Sidney Poitier, Frank Rich, Tim Robbins, Julia Roberts, David Semel, Joanna Shimkus, Martin Short, Alessandra Stanley, Sting, Barbra Streisand, Trudie Styler, Gore Vidal, Billy Wilder and Richard D. Zanuck. Some of the aforementioned people attended smaller lunch gatherings that were for women only.

Mengers's parties in her agenting days included Lauren Hutton, Mike Nichols and Paul Schrader.

Mengers introduced Barry Diller to his future wife Diane von Fürstenberg.

She would never be found without a joint in her hand.

== Death ==
Mengers died on Saturday, October 15, 2011, from pneumonia, "after a number of small strokes, and a lifetime of illnesses" at her home in Beverly Hills, California, "surrounded by three of her close friends, Ali MacGraw, Joanna Poitier, and Boaty Boatwright", at age 79. Vanity Fair editor Graydon Carter posted a written tribute the following morning.

== Legacy ==
- In the film The Last of Sheila (1973), the character played by actress Dyan Cannon is reportedly based on Mengers.
- Mengers expressed disapproval when she thought the character Shelley Winters portrayed in the Blake Edwards' film S.O.B. (1981), was based on her. She publicly stated that "An Alp should fall on their house."
- Elizabeth Taylor reportedly based her own character in the television movie These Old Broads (2001) on Mengers.
- In Barbara Walters's memoir Audition (2008), she describes Mengers as "a legend in the business. Smart, tough, and funny, she is also brutally honest."
- Mengers inspired the one-woman play I'll Eat You Last: A Chat with Sue Mengers, written by John Logan, which opened on Broadway on April 24, 2013, starring Bette Midler.
- The character of Susie Myerson in the Amazon Prime Video original series The Marvelous Mrs. Maisel (2017) was inspired by Mengers.
- Jennifer Lawrence was attached to produce and star as Mengers in a biopic directed by Paolo Sorrentino for Apple Studios in 2021.
- Mengers was portrayed by Mimi Gianopulos in the 2022 series The Offer, about the making of The Godfather.
