= Movie packaging =

Filmmaking activity

In film industry terminology, movie packaging or film packaging is a type of product bundling in which a top-level talent agency starts up a film or television project using writers, directors and/or actors it represents, before giving other agencies a chance to submit their clients for the project. For this service, the talent agency negotiates a packaging fee. Packaging is frequently done by the "big four" talent agencies Creative Artists Agency (CAA), Endeavor, United Talent Agency, and ICM Partners (now merged with CAA).

In 2019, the Writers Guild of America (WGA) sued several large talent agencies over the practice, arguing that they created conflicts of interest between the agents and those they represented. As a result, packaging practices were prohibited on all new WGA-covered projects after June 30, 2022.

== History ==
Talent agent Charles K. Feldman has been credited with coming up with the first Hollywood "package deal". In June 1942, Feldman signed Marlene Dietrich, Randolph Scott, and John Wayne, and presented them, along with the script and director, as a package to Universal Pictures for the film Pittsburgh.

Freddie Fields and David Begelman have also been credited with pioneering the movie "package" at their agency Creative Management Associates in the early 1970s. It has also been claimed that Michael Ovitz of CAA was the first to package movies, in the late 1970s.

== Business model ==
Packaging can be much more lucrative for agencies than the usual 10% fee. Instead, the packaging agency receives the equivalent of 5% of what the studio or network pays the production company; 5% of half (i.e., 2.5%) of any profit the production company earns; and 15% of adjusted gross (syndication revenue minus costs the network does not pay). In 1989, The New York Times reported that a major talent agency could earn between $21,000 and $100,000 for each episode of a network show.

The Writers Guild of America West (WGA West) estimated that 87% of TV shows were packaged during the 2016–2017 season.

== Criticism ==
Packaging as a practice has been criticized by several writers, directors, and actors as inherently causing a major conflict of interest between an agency and its clients. In 2019, David Simon published a letter detailing how packaging incentivized his agents to work against his best interests on the deal for the television show Homicide: Life on the Street. Simon's letter eventually led to a breakdown between the Writers Guild of America (WGA, the labor union representing screenwriters in the US) and the Association of Talent Agents (ATA, the group representing the major agencies), when the sides were unable to negotiate a "Code Of Conduct" agreement that addressed the concerns of packaging, resulting in the mass firing of talent agents by all WGA members on April 15, 2019.

== Lawsuit ==
On April 17, 2019, the two WGA groups, Writers Guild of America East and WGA West, sued the "big four" agencies, claiming that packaging fees are an "egregious conflict of interest" that "constitute unlawful kickbacks" from studios to the agencies.

The lawsuit was filed in Los Angeles Superior Court against the four dominant Hollywood talent agencies: Endeavor, CAA, United Talent Agency and ICM Partners. Approximately 95 percent of WGA members voted "in favor of a code of conduct that would cease packaging fees."
