= Guy McElwaine =

Hollywood agent, producer, and studio head (1936-2008)

- Born: June 29, 1936
- Died: April 2, 2008 (aged 71)
- Occupations: Talent agent, Film producer, Studio head
- Spouses: Pamela Austin (m. 1965; div. 1967) Leigh Taylor-Young (m. 1978; div. 1984)

Guy McElwaine (June 29, 1936 – April 2, 2008) was a Hollywood agent, producer, and studio head.

McElwaine played Minor League Baseball as a teenager, pitching in the C league in 1955 and leaving the game to join Metro-Goldwyn-Mayer's publicity department. He left MGM in 1959 to join the marketing and public relations agency Rogers & Cowan.

In 1964, he set up his own PR firm. He became an agent at Creative Management Associates (CMA) in 1969. While at CMA, he became vice president of worldwide production at Warner Bros., but left after 18 months to rejoin CMA. McElwaine was a founding partner of International Creative Management when CMA merged with International Famous Agency in 1975. He was the first agent of Steven Spielberg.

He left ICM to join Columbia Pictures in 1981 and became head of production in October 1983, replacing Frank Price and lasting until April 1986.

The first film that started production under his reign at Columbia Studios was The New Kids. Columbia's production increased during his reign, with 14 films started in 1984 compared to 9 in 1983, but none of the 14 were hits when they were released. The biggest hit produced under his tenure was The Karate Kid Part II with a gross of $115 million on a negative cost of $14 million. He greenlit Ishtar, produced by Warren Beatty for whom McElwaine had acted as publicist in the past. The budget doubled from an initial $27.5 million to $55 million, and he was fired after production wrapped. He was fired by Columbia Pictures and succeeded by David Puttnam.

He rejoined ICM in 1988 and in 2002 became president of Morgan Creek Entertainment until his death from pancreatic cancer.

McElwaine married six times, including two actresses: Pamela Austin and Leigh Taylor-Young. He was also involved with Lana Wood, who revealed in her 2021 memoir that she terminated a pregnancy by him in 1963.
