= Richard Shepherd (producer) =

American film producer

Dick Shepherd
- Born: Richard Allen Silberman; June 4, 1927; Kansas City, Missouri, U.S.
- Died: January 14, 2014 (aged 86); Los Angeles, California, U.S.
- Occupation: Film producer
- Spouses: Judith Mayer Goetz (m. 1954; div. 1978) Patricia Shepherd (m. 1979)
- Children: 4, including Scott

Richard Shepherd (born Richard Allen Silberman; June 4, 1927 – January 14, 2014) was an American film producer.

== Biography ==
They pay ballplayers a lot of money for hitting .333; I'd pay anybody a lot of money if they could be right 33.3 percent of the time in this business.

— Dick Shepherd, on the film industry

Born Richard Allen Silberman in 1927 in Kansas City, Missouri, he attended Stanford University and studied journalism. After graduating, he worked for talent agent Lew Wasserman at MCA, selling syndicated TV shows. In the early 1950s, Jews were somewhat ostracized where he worked, and he changed his name to Shepherd, according to his son Scott. During his employment with MCA, Shepherd enlisted in the United States Army, writing stories for the Stars and Stripes newspaper in post-World War II Germany.

After leaving MCA, he formed Jurow-Shepherd Productions with Martin Jurow. Their first picture together was The Hanging Tree starring Gary Cooper and Maria Schell which they followed with The Fugitive Kind, an adaptation of Tennessee Williams's Orpheus Descending, starring Marlon Brando and Anna Magnani.

They signed a six-picture deal with Paramount Pictures where they made films including an adaptation of Truman Capote's Breakfast at Tiffany’s. When Paramount Pictures wanted to replace the signature song "Moon River," both Shepherd and Jurow exclaimed "Over our dead bodies!" The song later won the Academy Award for Best Original Song.

He became an agent again in the 1960s, becoming one of the first partners at Creative Management Associates. He would go on to head production at Warner Bros. in 1970 and MGM in 1976 and later founded his own agency, the Artists Agency, where he would work into his 70s.

=== Personal life and death ===
Shepherd was married from 1954 to 1978 to Judith Mayer Goetz, daughter of film producer William Goetz and granddaughter of Louis B. Mayer. They had three children, Scott, Tony, and Victoria. In 1979, Shepherd married Patricia and had a son, Christopher, by her.

Shepherd died at his home in Los Angeles at the age of 86, from kidney failure.

== Filmography ==
He was a producer in all films unless otherwise noted.

=== Film ===
Year	Film	Credit	Notes
1959	The Hanging Tree		
1960	The Fugitive Kind		
1961	Love in a Goldfish Bowl		
1961	Breakfast at Tiffany's		
1976	Robin and Marian	Executive producer	
1976	Alex & the Gypsy		
1983	The Hunger		
1985	Volunteers		Final film as a producer

Production manager

Year	Film	Role
1974	The Towering Inferno	Production supervisor: Warner Bros.

Miscellaneous crew

Year	Film	Role
1998	The Man in the Iron Mask	Production assistant

=== Television ===
As writer

Year	Title	Notes
1988	What Price Victory	Television film
