= Marvin Josephson =

American talent agent and executive (1927–2022)

- Born: March 6, 1927; Atlantic City, New Jersey, U.S.
- Died: May 17, 2022 (aged 95); New York City, U.S.
- Education: Cornell University (BA, 1949); New York University (law degree, 1952)
- Occupations: Talent agent, executive
- Employer: CBS News legal department (1952–1955)
- Organization(s): Marvin Josephson Associates; International Famous Agency; International Creative Management
- Spouses: Ingrid Bergh (m. 1950; div. 1970) Tina Chen (m. 1973)
- Children: 5

Marvin Josephson (March 6, 1927 – May 17, 2022) was an American talent agent and founder of International Creative Management, later renamed ICM Partners.

== Early life and education ==
Josephson was born and raised in Atlantic City, New Jersey, and attended Atlantic City High School. He was of Jewish descent. Josephson graduated from Cornell University in 1949, where he was managing editor of The Cornell Daily Sun and a member of the Quill and Dagger society. He graduated from the New York University School of Law in 1952.

== Career ==
Josphson started his career in the legal department of CBS News. In 1955, he started his own talent agency, at first representing television journalists like Chet Huntley (and later, Barbara Walters). His first notable entertainment client was Bob Keeshan.

In 1968, he purchased the Ashley-Famous talent agency from Steve Ross of Kinney National Company, renaming it International Famous Agency (IFA). In 1971, Josephson added the clients and assets of Jerry Perenchio's Chartwell Artists to IFA; adding the literary assets of Robin Dalton that same year. Under Josephson, IFA became the world's first publicly traded talent agency.

In 1975, Josephson merged IFA with Freddie Fields' Creative Management Associates to form International Creative Management. In 1992, Josephson passed control of ICM onto Jeff Berg, Sam Cohn, and Jim Wiatt, though Josephson maintained a leadership role and continued to represent personal clients. In 2005, the company was sold to a private investor, Suhail Rizvi."

== Personal life ==
Josephson had three daughters and a son with his first wife, Ingrid Bergh, including ICM talent agent Nancy Josephson; they later divorced. In 1973, he married Tina Chen; they had one daughter, YiLing Chen-Josephson.

== Death ==
Josephson died on May 17, 2022 from complications of pneumonia in New York City, at age 95.
