= Frank Konigsberg =

American lawyer, TV producer, and agent

- Born: March 10, 1933
- Died: November 12, 2016 (aged 83)
- Education: Yale University; Yale Law School
- Occupations: Lawyer, television producer, agent
- Spouse: Susanne Konigsberg

Frank Konigsberg (March 10, 1933 – November 12, 2016) was an American lawyer, television producer and agent. He became the second largest shareholder of ICM Partners, and he subsequently served as the president of Telepictures. He was nominated for an Emmy nine times.

== Early life ==
Frank Konigsberg was born on March 10, 1933. He graduated from Yale University and Yale Law School.

== Career ==
Konigsberg started his career as a lawyer for CBS. He later worked for the International Famous Agency. He was Bing Crosby's agent. In 1975, he joined ICM Partners and became its second largest shareholder after Marvin Josephson. Meanwhile, he also founded Konigsberg Co., merged it with Telepictures Corporation in 1983, oversaw its production unit, Telepictures Productions, using the assets of the old Konigsberg Company, and subsequently served as the president of Telepictures until its merger with Lorimar in 1986.

With producer Larry Sanitsky, which Konigsberg met while working at Telepictures, he co-founded Konigsberg Sanitsky, a television production company in 1986. Konigsberg and Sanitsky were founders in the independent distribution firm, ACI in 1989, which was sold to Pearson Television in 1995. The company briefly turned out its only television series, Angel Falls in 1993. Sanitsky briefly left to join CBS in 1994 and reformed The Konigsberg Company, but after he briefly left CBS in 1995, The Konigsberg/Sanitsky Company was reestablished until 1998 in conjunction with the standalone Konigsberg Company. In the early 2000s, he formed a short venture with Drew Smith, Konigsberg-Smith Productions, the partnership was later dissolved in the 2000s.

Konisberg worked as a producer on Breaking Away, Rituals, The Tommyknockers, Gene Kelly: An American in Pasadena, Bing Crosby: His Life and Legend, Charles and Diana: Unhappily Ever After, Jesus, William & Kate, Ellis Island, Ben Hur and Titanic. He received nine Emmy Award nominations for his work on The Guyana Tragedy, The Last Don, The Oldest Living Confederate Widow Tells All and Children of the Dust.

== Personal life and death ==
Konigsberg had a wife, Susanne. He died on November 12, 2016.
