= A Man Called Horse =

A Man Called Horse may refer to:

- "A Man Called Horse" (short story), 1950 by Dorothy M. Johnson
- A Man Called Horse (film), a 1970 American-Mexican Western film based on the short story
