= The Return of a Man Called Horse =

1976 film by Irvin Kershner

- Theatrical release poster
- Directed by: Irvin Kershner
- Written by: Jack DeWitt
- Based on: Characters by Dorothy M. Johnson
- Produced by: Terry Morse Jr.
- Starring: Richard Harris; Gale Sondergaard; Geoffrey Lewis
- Cinematography: Owen Roizman
- Edited by: Michael Kahn
- Music by: Laurence Rosenthal
- Production companies: Estudios Churubusco Azteca; Sandy Howard Productions
- Distributed by: United Artists (United States); Estudios Churubusco Azteca (Mexico)
- Release date: June 28, 1976
- Running time: 129 minutes
- Countries: United States; Mexico
- Language: English
- Budget: $4 million

The Return of a Man Called Horse is a 1976 Western film directed by Irvin Kershner and written by Jack DeWitt. It is a sequel to the 1970 film A Man Called Horse, in turn based on Dorothy M. Johnson's short story of the same name, with Richard Harris reprises his role as Horse, a British aristocrat who has become a member of a tribe of Lakota Sioux. Other cast members include Gale Sondergaard, Geoffrey Lewis, and William Lucking.

Like its predecessor, the film is a Mexican-American co-production, shot primarily on-location in Mexico. Like its predecessor, the film was largely a critical and financial success, but was criticized by some for rehashing earlier plot elements. It was followed by a sequel in 1983, Triumphs of a Man Called Horse.

== Plot ==
Trappers with government support force the Yellow Hands Sioux off their sacred land. The Indians retreat, but await supernatural punishment to descend on their usurpers. John Morgan, 8th Earl of Kildare, who had lived with the tribe for years and is known as Horse, leaves his English fiancée and estate and returns to America, where he discovers the Yellow Hand people have been largely massacred or put into slavery by the unscrupulous white traders and their Indian cohorts.

He finds the tribe dispirited, because of the actions of the trappers, and he begins to devise a strategy to overpower the trappers' stronghold, convincing the Indians to take direct action. Soon, even the Indian women and boys are assigned tasks to aid the assault, to regain their ancestral land.

== Cast ==
- Richard Harris as John Morgan / Shunkawakan
- Gale Sondergaard as Elk Woman
- Geoffrey Lewis as Zenas
- Bill Lucking as Tom Gryce
- Jorge Luke as Running Bull
- Jorge Russek as Blacksmith
- Claudio Brook as Chemin De Fer
- Enrique Lucero as Raven
- Regino Herrera as Lame Wolf
- Pedro Damián as Standing Bear
- Humberto López as Thin Dog
- Alberto Mariscal as Red Cloud
- Eugenia Dolores as Brown Dove
- Patricia Reyes Spíndola as Gray Thorn
- Ana De Sade as Moon Star

== Filming ==
Much of the film was shot in 1975 in Sonora, Mexico, with additional scenes filmed in Custer State Park in South Dakota and the United Kingdom.

== Reception ==
The film received mixed reviews on its release. Roger Ebert, while not highly critical of the film, noted that the film attempted to take itself too seriously and paid unnecessary attention to detail. According to Ebert: "The film reveals its basic white-chauvinist bias, but it certainly seems to take itself seriously. It's of average length, but paced like an epic. There are four main movements in the plot: Return, Reconciliation, Revenge and Rebirth. If this seems a little thin for a two-hour movie, believe me, it is, even with all that portentous music trying to make it seem momentous".

Ebert also criticized the repetition in the film from the original A Man Called Horse. Ebert commented that "what gets me is that initiation rite, which is repeated in this film in such grim and bloody detail you'd think people didn't have enough of it the last time. First Morgan has his pectoral muscles pierced with knife blades. Then eagle's talons are drawn through the wounds and tied to leather thongs. Then he hangs by the thongs until sufficiently purified. You'd think one ceremony like that would do the trick, without any booster shots".

Producer Sandy Howard later said the film was "too gratutious. Kershner cast it with Jews and made too much of a play on graphic violence... I didn't like what I saw. But the critics were generous."

== DVD ==
The Return of a Man Called Horse was released to DVD by MGM Home Video on April 1, 2003, as a Region 1 widescreen DVD.
