= Sam Cohn =

American talent agent (1929–2009)

- Cohn in 1984
- Born: Samuel Charles Cohn; May 11, 1929; Altoona, Pennsylvania
- Died: May 6, 2009 (aged 79); New York City
- Occupation: Talent agent
- Years active: 1956–2009
- Spouse: Jane Gelfman
- Children: 2

Samuel Charles Cohn (May 11, 1929 – May 6, 2009) was an American talent agent at International Creative Management, a firm he helped create, in the borough of Manhattan in New York City.

Cohn has been described as one of the most powerful agents in the 1970s and 1980s, and had an extensive client list that included top stars in theater and film. Some of his most well-known clients included Paul Newman, Woody Allen, Meryl Streep, Sigourney Weaver, Liza Minnelli, Whoopi Goldberg, Cher, Dianne Wiest, Jackie Gleason, Dame Maggie Smith, Robert Altman, and E.L. Doctorow. Time magazine called Cohn "the first superagent of the modern age".

== Early life ==
Cohn was born to a Jewish family in Altoona, Pennsylvania. His father, grandfather and uncle operated a company called Independent Oil Company of Pennsylvania that marketed refined petroleum products, and was later sold to Standard Oil of New York.

Cohn attended the Culver Military Academy in Indiana, and earned a bachelor's degree in English and German literature from Princeton University. He enrolled in Yale Law School, but put his legal studies on hold to join the Army, where he served for two years. He was stationed in Japan at the end of the Korean War and became a private first class. He completed his law degree in 1956.

== Career ==
He worked his way up through the television industry with stints as a television producer, as a lawyer at CBS, and as a lawyer and business executive at Goodson-Todman, producer of game shows including The Price Is Right. He was also a lawyer for a small agency, General Artists Corporation, which, through a series of acquisitions and mergers, evolved first into a larger agency called Creative Management Associates (founded by Freddie Fields and David Begelman), and then, in 1974, into ICM.

A lengthy 1982 profile by Mark Singer in The New Yorker (reprinted in a later book by Singer) described Cohn's career and personality in detail. Cohn was known for lunching at New York's Russian Tea Room almost every day, his habit of eating paper, and his strong preference for New York over Los Angeles, which is unusual among major motion picture agents. Cohn was also famously difficult to reach on the phone. His obituaries in the two leading entertainment industry trade newspapers both mentioned that he was "the most difficult man in the business to get on the phone"; and, in his New Yorker profile, Singer repeated an industry joke that Cohn's tombstone would read, "Here lies Sam Cohn. He'll get back to you."

The character Arnold Moss, a paper-eating talent agent based on Cohn, was created by Nora Ephron and portrayed by Dan Aykroyd in Ephron's 1992 film This Is My Life.

Cohn's client list and influence waned in later years; and, in 1999, he left his position as the head of ICM's New York office. He remained a member of ICM's board of directors until 2005 and continued to work at ICM until retiring in early 2009. The Variety article reporting his retirement noted: "Hanging onto his trademark ways to the very end, Cohn did not return a call from Daily Variety for comment."

Cohn died in May 2009 in Manhattan after a short illness; he was 79.

== Personal life ==
Cohn was married three times, including to Jane Gelfman at the time of his death. He had a daughter, Marya, a son, Peter, and four grandchildren. Cohn also dated actress and client Dianne Wiest for three years in the mid-1980s.
