= Stageworks Media, LLC. =

- Founded: 2013
- Founder: Michael Barra
- Country of origin: United States
- Headquarters location: New York City
- Official website: www.stageworksmedia.com

Stageworks Media, LLC. is a New York City-based theatrical production company that specializes in partnering with content owners to adapt their library as well as original material for the stage. Stageworks is the producing arm and partner of Playscripts, Inc. Stageworks has partnered with leading companies in the industry, such as CBS, Universal Music Group, and ICM Partners, among others.
