= Sandy Howard =

American film producer and television producer

Sandy Howard (August 1, 1927 – May 16, 2008) was an American film producer and television producer.

== Biography ==
A native of the Bronx, New York City, Howard wrote short stories for publication in magazines like Liberty, and worked as a publicist for Broadway shows until he became a director for the Howdy Doody show at the age of nineteen; he later produced the Captain Kangaroo show.

He cooperated with Ray Heatherton creating the TV show The Merry Mailman in the early 1950s. He was producer of The Barry Gray Radio Show (1951–1958).

=== Film producer ===
In the 1960s, Howard moved to Hollywood to pursue a career in film. Among his film productions are A Man Called Horse (1970) and Man in the Wilderness (1971).

After an explosion on the Greek set of Sky Riders (1976), which he was producing for 20th Century Fox, a Greek electrician died and 11 others were injured and Howard was arrested for manslaughter and detained for several weeks. He was unable to leave the country for five months and a $250,000 out-of-court settlement was made, - which one Variety article called a "bribe" - so the crew member responsible would not be imprisoned by the military regime.

While stuck in Greece, he claimed he made unfavourable deals to make films such as The Return of a Man Called Horse (1976) and The Island of Dr Moreau (1977). He contributed as writer on Vice Squad (1982).

In December 1984, he and his company filed for bankruptcy claiming that he was owed millions of dollars from foreign distributors despite the recent success of Angel (1984) and having four films ready to be released.

In 1986, he had signed a film deal with Spectrafilm via his Howard International Film Group to produce and distribute three films, and also serve as a co-financing agreement on these films that were part of the Spectrafilm pact, and the move gave them a consistent theatrical distribution distributor for the first time since 1984, and the first title was PrettyKill, which Spectrafilm had domestic theatrical distribution rights, while Lorimar-Telepictures would have other world rights to the title. In 1987, TV producer Fries Entertainment received a deal in which they would acquire three rights to Sandy Howard's productions overseas, on behalf of Spectrafilm and Sandy Howard Productions. That year, Sandy Howard had teamed up with Australian film and video company Taimac SBS to co-produce four theatrical films that was set for release in 1988, and the first project planned in the SBS/Sandy Howard co-production agreement was Truk Lagoon, which was slated for a $7.2 million budget, but the film was never materialized.

=== Death ===
He developed Alzheimers and spent the last ten years of his life as a resident at the Motion Picture & Television Fund Hospital in Woodland Hills, in the Alzheimer's and dementia care facility, Harry's Haven. He died in 2008.

== Select credits ==
- The Howdy Doody Show (1947–59) (TV series) - director
- Night Court USA (1958) (TV series) - producer, director, writer, creator
- Tarzan and the Trappers (1958) - director
- Police Station (1959) (TV series) - producer, director, writer
- Congressional Investigator (1959) (TV series) - director
- 'Harrigan and Son (1960-61) (TV series) - producer
- Mack & Myer for Hire (1963-64) (TV series) - producer
- Diary of a Bachelor (1964) - producer, director
- City of Fear (1965) - producer
- Gamera the Invincible (1966) - director of US sequences
- Jack of Diamonds (1967) - producer, writer
- One Step to Hell (1968) - producer, director, writer
- A Man Called Horse (1970) - producer
- Man in the Wilderness (1971) - producer
- The Neptune Factor (1973) - producer
- Together Brothers (1974) - executive producer
- The Devil's Rain (1975) - executive producer
- Embryo (1976) - executive producer
- Sky Riders (1976) - executive producer
- Captain Kangaroo (1976) (TV series) - producer
- The Island of Dr Moreau (1977) - executive producer
- Echoes of a Summer (1976) - producer
- The Return of a Man Called Horse (1976) - executive producer
- Circle of Iron (1978) - producer
- Meteor (1979) - executive producer
- Jaguar Lives! (1979) - producer
- City on Fire (1979) - executive producer
- Savage Harvest (1981) - producer
- Vice Squad (1982) - executive producer
- Hambone and Hillie (1983) - producer
- Deadly Force (1983) - producer
- Triumphs of a Man Called Horse (1983) - executive producer
- Angel (1984) - executive producer
- What Waits Below (1984) - producer
- Avenging Angel (1985) - producer
- The Boys Next Door (1985) - producer
- KGB: The Secret War (1985) - producer
- Hollywood Vice Squad (1986) - producer, writer
- Nightstick (1987) - executive producer
- Kidnapped (1987) - producer
- Street Justice (1987) - executive producer
- Blue Monkey (1987) - executive producer
- Dark Tower (1989) - producer (uncredited)

== Awards ==
- The Bronze Wrangler from the 1971 Western Heritage Awards, for A Man Called Horse (shared with director Elliot Silverstein, writer Jack DeWitt, and actors Judith Anderson, Jean Gascon, Corinna Tsopei and Richard Harris).
