= The Hanging Tree (film) =

1959 film by Delmer Daves

- Directed by: Delmer Daves
- Screenplay by: Wendell Mayes; Halsted Welles
- Based on: The Hanging Tree; 1957 novelette by Dorothy M. Johnson
- Produced by: Martin Jurow; Richard Shepherd
- Starring: Gary Cooper; Maria Schell; Karl Malden
- Cinematography: Ted D. McCord
- Edited by: Owen Marks
- Music by: Jerry Livingston (title song); Max Steiner
- Color process: Technicolor
- Production company: Baroda Productions
- Distributed by: Warner Bros. Pictures
- Release date: February 11, 1959
- Running time: 107 minutes
- Country: United States
- Language: English
- Box office: $2.2 million (est. US/ Canada rentals)

The Hanging Tree is a 1959 American Western film directed by Delmer Daves, based on the novelette The Hanging Tree, written by Dorothy M. Johnson in 1957. The film stars Gary Cooper, Maria Schell, Karl Malden and George C. Scott, and it is set in the gold fields of Montana during the gold rush of the 1860s and 1870s. The story follows a doctor who saves a criminal from a lynch mob, then earns the enmity of several prospectors while trying to protect a young woman whom he has nursed back to health after she was injured in a coach robbery. Karl Malden assumed directing duties for several days when Daves fell ill, and the film represented the first cinematic appearance for George C. Scott.

== Plot ==
Joseph Frail (Gary Cooper)—doctor, gambler, gunslinger—rides into the small town of Skull Creek, Montana, with miners in a gold rush, looking to set up a doctor's office. He passes by the "hanging tree," an old oak with a thick branch over which has been slung a rope with a frayed end, presumably a former noose.

He rescues and treats Rune (Ben Piazza), a young man who was shot by Frenchy (Karl Malden) while trying to steal gold from a sluice. As Rune has no money to pay for his care, Frail forces Rune into temporary servitude with the threat of revealing he is the thief.

A stagecoach is robbed and overturned, killing the driver and a male passenger. A search party is formed, and Frenchy finds the sole survivor, Swiss immigrant Elizabeth Mahler (Maria Schell), daughter of the male passenger.

Crippled by burns, blindness and dehydration, Elizabeth is moved into a house next to the doctor's house to recover. The placement causes much chagrin among the town's righteous women, who believe that Elizabeth may be paying for her medical care through illicit behavior.

Frenchy sneaks in under the guise of trying to strike a business deal with Elizabeth, but instead tries to kiss her. Frail witnesses the aggression and chases Frenchy back to town. Frail beats him up and threatens to kill him. Meanwhile, a faith healer named Dr. Grubb (George C. Scott) sees Frail's medical practice as a threat.

Elizabeth eventually regains her sight and makes romantic overtures toward Frail. He rejects her. She leaves in a huff, determined to strike it rich as a prospector so that she can pay off Frail and get out from under his control.

She teams with Rune and Frenchy, who plan to buy a claim and set up a sluice. To get money, she pawns a family heirloom necklace. It is worthless, but Frail secretly tells the storekeeper to loan her however much money she needs.

She finds out and asks Frail why he did not respond to her affection. He reveals that his wife had an affair with his own brother. He found them together, both dead, an apparent murder-suicide. In a rage, he burned down his house with their bodies in it. He tells Elizabeth he is "not allowed to forget."

Elizabeth, Frenchy and Rune strike it rich on their claim, finding a "glory hole" of gold under a large tree stump. They ride into town, tossing a few pieces of gold to the townsfolk. Frenchy, overwhelmed by his sudden importance in the town, uses some of the gold to buy whiskey for everyone. The gaiety quickly turns into a riot of the lawless town members led by Dr. Grubb. While the lawful citizens of the town are engaged in fighting fires set by Grubb, Frenchy takes advantage of the commotion to make advances on Elizabeth. Her lack of interest sparks a brutal physical assault as he attempts to rape her. Frail again catches Frenchy just in time. Frenchy pulls his pistol and shoots, but misses. Frail kills Frenchy.

Seeing his opportunity to remove his "competition", Grubb incites the mob to lynch Frail. They carry him to the hanging tree, tie his hands, and stand him up in a wagon bed, the rope around his neck. Rune and Elizabeth rush in carrying their gold and the deed to their claim. Elizabeth offers everything to the townsfolk if they will let Frail live. As the mob turns on itself in the struggle to grab the gold and the deed, the lynch party disperses.

Elizabeth now feels she has repaid Frail in full. Rune slips the noose off, and Elizabeth turns to walk away. Frail calls out her name. She turns back, and steps to the end of the wagon. He kneels down, cups her chin with both hands, and they touch their heads together acknowledging their love.

== Cast ==
- Gary Cooper as Doc Frail
- Karl Malden as "Frenchy" Plante
- Maria Schell as Elizabeth Mahler
- George C. Scott as Grubb
- Karl Swenson as Tom Flaunce
- Ben Piazza as Rune
- Virginia Gregg as Edna Flaunce
- John Dierkes as Society Red
- King Donovan as Wonder

== Production ==
The film was the first one for Cooper's Baroda Productions company. It was the first film produced by former talent agents Martin Jurow and Richard Shepherd.

Wendell Mayes said "it was the only western that I think that I've ever seen that was a woman's film rather than a man's film—Maria Schell playing the blind heroine was marvelous."

Principal photography was shot on location in the Oak Creek Wildlife Area in the mountains west of Yakima, Washington. The scenes during the opening credits and title, where Gary Cooper rides alongside the river on horseback with a pack horse in tow, were filmed about mid-June in 1958, just northeast of Goose Prairie, Washington, along the north bank of the Bumping River. The fictional small gold mining town of Skull Creek was a temporary film set constructed along the south side of Little Rattlesnake Creek by its confluence with Rattlesnake Creek, just southwest of Nile, Washington.

The cinematography by Ted McCord made use of full-aperture photography and reduction printing to improve the grain quality of the film. This process involves widening the aperture of the camera to capture a larger image, then reducing the image back to standard size in post-production. While this achieves the greatest effect jumping from larger formats like 65-mm film, McCord used 35-mm film and extended to aperture to the sprocket holes on the film. When shooting a subject from 100 feet (30.5 m), this extended the width of the shot from 42 to 48 feet (from 12.8 to 14.6 m).

== Soundtrack ==
Marty Robbins performed the title song that was nominated for best song at the 32nd Annual Academy Awards and the 1960 Golden Laurel Award for Best Song. The lyrics contain a short reference to the film's story. It was released on the reissue of the album Gunfighter Ballads and Trail Songs (1959) by Robbins. A known cover-version is by Frankie Laine who performed this song at the 32nd Academy Awards.

The film's score was composed by Max Steiner.

- The Hanging Tree
- Lyrics by Mack David
  - Music by Jerry Livingston
  - Vocal by Marty Robbins

== Reception ==
The film was received well by audiences and critics at its 1959 debut. Film Bulletin drew a parallel between the "glory hole" of gold Elizabeth and Rune discover and the profits of the film.

In The New York Times, critic Bosley Crowther wrote:

Delmer Daves has directed the gold camp action for a great deal of clatter and bang, and it all looks rambunctious and authentic on the vividly colored screen. Indeed, what with one thing and another, the story is absorbing to the end. It keeps you wondering and wishing—finally wishing it were a little better, that's all.

== See also ==
- List of American films of 1959
