= Man in the Wilderness =

1971 film

- Theatrical release poster
- Directed by: Richard C. Sarafian
- Written by: Jack DeWitt
- Produced by: Sandy Howard
- Starring: Richard Harris; John Huston
- Cinematography: Gerry Fisher
- Edited by: Geoffrey Foot
- Music by: Johnny Harris
- Production companies: Limbridge; Wilderness Films
- Distributed by: Warner Bros.
- Release date: November 24, 1971
- Running time: 104 minutes
- Country: United States
- Language: English
- Budget: <$2 million

Man in the Wilderness is a 1971 American revisionist Western film about a scout for a group of mountain men who are traversing the Northwestern United States during the 1820s. Scout Zachary Bass is mauled by a bear and left to die by his companions. He survives and recuperates sufficiently to track his former comrades, forcing a confrontation over his abandonment. The story is loosely based on the life of Hugh Glass. It stars Richard Harris as Zachary Bass and John Huston as Captain Filmore Henry.

The expedition in the movie is notable for bringing a large boat with it, borne on wheels.

== Plot ==
In 1820, an expedition led by Captain Filmore Henry has completed two years of fur trapping in the unexplored Northwest territory. They are determined to reach the Missouri River before winter so they can sail south and trade their goods. Lowrie, a young trapper, hunts a deer and Zachary Bass follows after it until he is mauled by a brown bear. Too afraid to intervene, Lowrie sends for Henry and his men, who eventually kill the bear.

Zachary's flesh wounds are examined by the expedition's doctor, Ferris, who believes he will not survive the journey. Henry orders Lowrie and Fogarty, another trapper, to have Zachary buried even if he is not dead by morning and have Lowrie deliver a eulogy. Both men remain at Zachary's side as the expedition departs. By the next morning, both men leave Zachary, who is still conscious, for dead as the Arikara natives approach. The natives approach him and leave without incident, as Zachary drifts in and out of consciousness. He first remembers his days as a student, and his then-pregnant wife Grace, who urges him to believe God is in him and all living things.

Within hours, Lowrie and Fogarty return to Henry's expedition and report they had left Zachary for dead. Henry decides not to return for him, believing Zachary would want the expedition to continue. Meanwhile, Zachary, though injured, scavenges for food by consuming berries and raw bison meat. He builds himself a leg crutch and salvages wire, a knife, and a spear blade to help him to kindle a fire. He traps a rabbit and uses its fur as an armpit cushion. Within days, Zachary regains his strength, and he traps and skins a cougar for its coat.

As the winter approaches, Zachary hides as a native couple approaches, and he watches as the woman gives birth. This rekindles memories of Grace, who had died in childbirth bearing an infant son. Fogarty, who is on the night watch, believes he sees Zachary and shoots him, but it turns out he had killed Lowrie. The next morning, the expedition arrive at a frozen river and are forced to carry the boat for the duration of the journey.

One morning, the natives head towards Henry's expedition, and a gunfight ensues. Zachary pushes forward to help the expedition until the native chief stops the fighting when he recognizes Zachary. The chief blesses Zachary and returns his spear to him. Zachary returns to the expedition and approaches Henry, who returns his rifle to him. Henry fears he will be shot, but Zachary decides to return to his son. He leaves, and the expedition follows after him.

== Cast ==
- Richard Harris as Zachary Bass
- John Huston as Captain Filmore Henry
- Henry Wilcoxon as Indian Chief
- Prunella Ransome as Grace Bass
- Percy Herbert as Fogarty
- Dennis Waterman as Lowrie
- Norman Rossington as Ferris
- James Doohan as Benoit
- Bryan Marshall as Potts
- Ben Carruthers as Longbow
- John Bindon as Coulter
- Robert Russell as Smith
- Sheila Raynor as Grace's Mother
- Judith Furse as Nurse

== Production ==
Man in the Wilderness is based loosely on the 1818–20 Missouri Expedition and Captain Filmore Henry is likely a fictionalized Major Andrew Henry of the Rocky Mountain Fur Company. It was based on an original script by Jack DeWitt and bought by producer Sandy Howard. In December 1970, Howard announced that the film would star Richard Harris, who had made A Man Called Horse for Howard. Elliot Silverstein directed Horse but clashed with Harris so Richard Sarafian was brought in to direct this film. Howard said he was "convinced" that Sarafian "is going to be one of the most important directors in America very soon."

Filming began on January 25, 1971. It ended June 1971. The film was shot near Covaleda, Province of Soria, Spain, with the terrain looking more like the Adirondack wilderness and less like the Absaroka Range country of the Yellowstone River. Not technically a "Spaghetti Western", Man was filmed in the rugged highlands where David Lean had shot some of the scenes for Doctor Zhivago in 1964. John Huston joined the production a few days after quitting as director of the film The Last Run due to on-set fights with George C. Scott.

The bear who attacks Harris' character Zachary Bass was called Peg. The attack sequence was filmed using a dummy. "This movie is Genesis to me," said Harris. "It's my apocalypse. It's a very special and very personal statement about a man struggling for personal identity, looking for God and discovering Him in the wilderness, in leaves and trees. It's all the things that the young people, and we, are missing today." Harris only had nine lines of dialogue.

== Themes ==
Though survival and revenge are the main themes, Christianity and religion play a significant role in the evolution of the main character, who is shown through flashbacks to be at odds with religion and God in general due to his lonely and abusive childhood involving indoctrination into Christianity.

== Release ==
The film was released theatrically in the United States on November 24, 1971, including New York City, New York, and Los Angeles, California.

The film was the first feature to be shown in years at the newly refurbished Princess Theatre (renamed the Klondike Theatre, at the time) in Edmonton, Alberta, Canada, on December 25, 1971.

== See also ==
- List of American films of 1971
- Lord Grizzly, a 1954 biographical novel by Frederick Manfred, about the Hugh Glass story
- Survival film, about the film genre, with a list of related films
- The Revenant (2015), also about Hugh Glass
- The Song of Hugh Glass, an epic poem from 1915, part of A Cycle of the West, written by John Neihardt, who is most famous for his book Black Elk Speaks.
