= MCA Inc. =

American media and entertainment conglomerate

- Final logo, used from 1972 to 1996
- Type: Subsidiary
- Traded as: NYSE: MCA
- Industry: Entertainment
- Founded: 1924; 102 years ago (as Music Corporation of America); November 10, 1958; 68 years ago (as MCA Inc.)
- Founders: Jules Stein; William R. Goodheart, Jr.
- Defunct: December 9, 1996; 29 years ago
- Fate: Acquired by Seagram and later reincorporated as Universal Studios Inc.
- Successors: Universal Studios; Seagram
- Headquarters: Chicago, Illinois, United States
- Parent: Matsushita Electric Industrial Co., Ltd. (1990–1995); Seagram (1995–1996)
- Divisions: Universal Pictures; Universal Television; MCA Records
- Subsidiaries: Decca Records; Spencer Gifts

MCA Inc., originally an initialism for Music Corporation of America, was an American media conglomerate that operated from 1924 to December 6, 1996. Originally a talent agency with artists in the music business as clients, the company became a major force in the film industry and later expanded into television production. MCA published music, booked acts, ran the MCA Records music label, represented film, television and radio stars, and eventually produced and sold television programs to the three major television networks, especially NBC.

MCA was the legal predecessor of Vivendi Universal and its successor NBCUniversal. Its other legal successor is Universal Music Group Holding Corp, a holding company owned by Universal Music Group (which absorbed PolyGram).

== History ==
=== Early years ===
MCA was formed in 1924 by Jules Stein and William R. Goodheart Jr. as Music Corporation of America, a music booking agency based in Chicago, Illinois. MCA helped pioneer modern practices of touring bands and name acts. Early on, MCA booked such prominent artists as King Oliver and Jelly Roll Morton for clubs and speakeasies run by legendary notorious Chicago mobsters such as Al Capone and others.

Lew Wasserman joined MCA in 1936 at the age of 23 and rose through the ranks of MCA for more than four decades, with Sonny Werblin as his right-hand man. Wasserman helped create MCA's radio show, Kay Kyser's Kollege of Musical Knowledge, which debuted on NBC Radio that same year. Following that success, Stein installed Wasserman in New York City in 1937, but Wasserman convinced him that Hollywood was the best place for the company's growth.

=== "The Rules of the Road" ===
The company was guided by a codification of Stein's pet policies known as "The Rules of The Road". The Rules were passed down from the Prohibition era, Chicago–area MCA (referenced in books like Citizen Cohn and The King and Queen of Hollywood) to the 1940s Los Angeles–area firm, which focused on representing movie actors.

The Rules were next passed to the 1950s generation of MCA talent agents, including Jerry Perenchio, who later owned and headed a number of businesses including Univision from 1992 to 2007. Perenchio was well known for his version of the Rules (up to twenty rules), which varied from year to year and had some internal contradictions (In 2006, Perenchio pointed out that while there was a "no nepotism" rule, he was aware his son was on the company's board of directors at the time).

=== Move to Hollywood: "The Octopus" ===
In 1939, based on Wasserman's recommendation, MCA's headquarters moved from Chicago to Beverly Hills, California, creating a movie division. The company began to acquire talent agencies, representing established actors such as James Stewart, Henry Fonda, Bette Davis, Jane Wyman and Ronald Reagan, whom Wasserman became very close with personally. In later decades, Wasserman became a guiding force in Reagan's political ambition by helping Reagan to win the presidency of the Screen Actors Guild (SAG), then election as Governor of California in 1966, and finally President of the United States in 1980.

By the end of the 1930s, MCA had become the largest talent agency in the world, with over 700 clients, including movie stars, recording artists, Broadway actors, radio stars, and directors. The company's aggressive acquisition of clientele in all entertainment sectors earned MCA the nickname of "The Octopus". The company's activities led U.S. Department of Justice agents to investigate not only whether MCA was a monopoly breaking antitrust laws, but also its suspected connections to underworld criminal activities. This investigation continued for the next few decades.

=== Revue Productions and the early days of television ===
In 1948, Jules Stein moved up as MCA's first chairman, giving Lew Wasserman charge of day-to-day operations of the company as president. That year, Stein and Wasserman decided to get into a new medium that would soon change the entertainment industry: television. Although many motion picture studios would not touch this new medium, thinking it was just a fad and would fade away, MCA decided to embrace it. First, however, the company needed to get a waiver from the Screen Actors Guild, which ruled at the time that talent agencies such as MCA were prohibited from producing TV shows or films. Thanks to the newly elected SAG president, Ronald Reagan (an MCA client), MCA was granted a waiver to start producing TV shows.

After the waiver was granted, the company formed MCA Television Limited for syndication. In 1950, Revue Productions, once a live concert promotion division that produced "Stage Door Canteen" live events for the USO during World War II, was re-launched as MCA's television production subsidiary. By 1956, Revue became the top supplier of television for all broadcast networks, spanning three decades of television programs such as Armour Theater, General Electric Theater, The Jane Wyman Show, Leave It to Beaver, Wagon Train, and many others. Prior to 1958, all Revue's shows were filmed at the old Republic Pictures studio lot in Studio City, California.

In February 1958, MCA acquired Paramount Pictures' pre-1950 sound feature film library for $10 million, through a newly created MCA subsidiary, EMKA, Ltd.

In December 1958, MCA bought the 423-acre (1.71 km^{2}) Universal Studios lot from Universal Pictures for $11,250,000 and renamed it, as well as the actual television unit, Revue Studios. As part of the deal, MCA leased the studios back to Universal for $2 million a year, plus unlimited access to MCA's clients such as Jimmy Stewart, Rock Hudson, Doris Day and Alfred Hitchcock to make films for Universal.

Stein, who by this time was the sole owner of MCA, decided to take the company public by giving 51% of his ownership of MCA to his employees, which included a 20% stake for Wasserman. The company went public on the New York Stock Exchange and was incorporated as MCA Inc. on November 10, 1958. A couple of years later, Alfred Hitchcock gave MCA his rights to Psycho and his television anthology in exchange for 150,000 shares, making him the third largest investor in MCA, and his own boss at Universal.

=== Takeovers of Universal Pictures and Decca Records ===
On June 18, 1962, Decca Records shareholders agreed to MCA's buyout offer after the record label had entered into talks about a merger that April. Decca at the time owned Coral Records and Brunswick Records, and an 89% stake in Universal-International.

On July 13, 1962, the United States Department of Justice filed suit against MCA, charging that its acquisition of Decca's controlling interest in Universal violated antitrust laws. To retain Universal, MCA would have to close its talent agency, which represented most of the industry's biggest names (a select few handled by Wasserman personally). In reality, MCA's talent agency arm became defunct the day the DOJ filed the suit; dissolving it that October was a mere formality.

MCA's now-former agents quickly formed new agencies, many of which are woven into the corporate fabric of today's talent management; Jerry Perenchio's Chartwell Artists represented Elizabeth Taylor and Muhammad Ali. Former MCA agents Freddie Fields and David Begelman formed Creative Management Associates, another important new agency.

By the end of 1962, MCA assumed full ownership of Universal.

In 1964, MCA entered the music publishing business when it acquired Lou Levy's Leeds Music, and formed Universal City Studios the same year in effort to merge under one umbrella both Universal Pictures and its Revue Studios division, which was later reincorporated as Universal Television in 1966.

On July 15, 1964, MCA established the Studio Tour, which provided guests a behind-the-scenes glimpse of film and television production at Universal Studios. This established a footprint of what is now known as Universal Studios Hollywood theme park. Over the next few decades, similar parks were built and expanded under MCA for Universal Orlando Resort in Orlando, Florida and Universal Studios Japan in Osaka.

In 1966, MCA formed Uni Records in Hollywood, California, and in 1967, MCA bought New York–based Kapp Records. That same year MCA also acquired guitar maker Danelectro and mall retailer Spencer Gifts.

=== Further expansion ===
In 1967, the MCA Records label was established outside the United States and Canada to issue releases by the MCA group of labels. Decca, Kapp, and Uni were merged into MCA Records at Universal City, California in 1971; the three labels maintained their identities for a short time but were soon retired in favor of the MCA label. The first MCA Records release in the US was former Uni artist Elton John's "Crocodile Rock" in 1972. In 1973, the final Decca pop label release, "Drift Away", a No. 5 pop hit by Dobie Gray, was issued.

MCA had two failed mergers in 1969. Initially, it planned a merger with Westinghouse Electric Corporation but that collapsed in April, and in July, they announced a proposed merger with the Firestone Tire and Rubber Company, but this too was called off in September.

In 1973, Stein stepped down from the company he founded and Wasserman took over as chairman and chief executive officer, while Sidney Sheinberg was appointed president and chief operating officer of MCA. Other executives within MCA were Lawrence R. Barnett, who ran the agency's live acts division during its glory agency years in the 1950s and 1960s, and Ned Tanen, head of Universal Pictures. Tanen was behind Universal hits such as Animal House, and John Hughes's Sixteen Candles and The Breakfast Club.

MCA issued soundtrack albums for most films released by Universal Pictures.

In 1975, the company entered the book publishing business with the acquisition of G. P. Putnam's Sons. In 1979, it acquired ABC Records along with its subsidiaries Paramount Records, Impulse! Records, and Dot Records. ABC had acquired the Paramount and Dot labels when it purchased Gulf+Western's record labels in 1974, then the parent company of Paramount Pictures.

From 1983 to 1989, Irving Azoff was chairman of MCA Records and is credited for turning around the fortunes of the label.

The Chess Records catalog was acquired from the remnants of Sugarhill in 1985. Motown Records was bought in 1988 (and sold to PolyGram in 1993). GRP Records (which became for some years MCA's jazz music label and thus began managing the company's jazz catalogue) and Geffen Records (which served as another mainstream music subsidiary) were acquired in 1990.

MCA also acquired other assets outside of the music industry. It became a shareholder in USA Network in 1981, eventually owning 50% of the network (the other half was owned by Paramount). In 1982, its publishing division, G. P. Putnam's Sons, bought Grosset & Dunlap from Filmways. In 1984, MCA bought Walter Lantz Productions and its characters, including Woody Woodpecker. In 1985, MCA bought toy and video game company LJN. It also bought a TV station in New York City, WWOR-TV (renamed from WOR-TV), in 1987, from RKO General subsidiary of GenCorp, which was in the midst of a licensing scandal.

In 1982, MCA decided to start out its video game unit, MCA Video Games, led by technicians of the MCA DiscoVision unit.

In 1983, MCA Videogames, the video game division of MCA itself and video game developer/publisher Atari Inc. entered into a partnership to start out Studio Games, a joint venture that would develop video games based on MCA's film and television properties, most notably from then-sister Universal Pictures, and decided that they would give them access to all motion picture and television properties coming from the unit.

In 1990, MCA hired Hanna-Barbera executive Jeff Segal to start out its MCA Family Entertainment arm (aka Universal Family Entertainment) and had Universal Cartoon Studios as its subsidiary.

=== Sale to Matsushita and Seagram ===
On November 26, 1990, Japanese multinational conglomerate Matsushita Electric Industrial Co., Ltd. agreed to acquire MCA for US$6.59 billion. MCA was forced to sell WWOR-TV in 1991 to Pinelands, Inc. because of the Federal Communications Commission (FCC) rules that foreign companies could not own over 25% of a U.S. TV station.

In 1995, Seagram acquired 80% of MCA from Matsushita. On November 26, 1996, MCA announced that it would acquire television syndication company Multimedia Entertainment from Gannett, who acquired its parent company in 1995, for $40 million.

=== Later years ===
On December 9, 1996, the new owners dropped the MCA name; the company became Universal Studios Inc. MCA's music division, MCA Music Entertainment Group, was renamed Universal Music Group. MCA Records continued as a label of Universal Music Group. The following year, G. P. Putnam's Sons was sold to the Penguin Group subsidiary of Pearson PLC.

After MCA Records was folded into Geffen Records in 2003, Interscope Capitol Labels Group and Universal Music Enterprises manage MCA's rock, pop, and urban back catalogues (including those from ABC Records and Famous Music Group) in conjunction with Geffen – UME and Geffen have re-released various albums from MCA in the years since, as well as several compilations. Its country music label MCA Records Nashville is still in operation, and is one of the only businesses using the MCA trademark as of 2016, along with MCA Records France (imprint of Universal Music France). MCA's jazz catalogue is managed by Verve Records (through the Impulse! and GRP imprints, depending on whether the recording was acquired from ABC or not), while its classical music catalogue is managed by Deutsche Grammophon. MCA's musical theatre catalogue is managed by Decca Records on its Decca Broadway imprint.

On April 25, 2025, Universal Music Group Nashville was rebranded as MCA, comprising Capitol Records Nashville, EMI Records Nashville, Mercury Nashville, MCA Nashville, and Lucille Records.

== See also ==
- LaserDisc
- MCA Records
- MCA Whitney Recording Studio
- NBCUniversal
- Seagram
- Vivendi
