= The Hanging Tree (Johnson novel) =

Novella

- Author: Dorothy M. Johnson
- Language: English
- Genre: American Western
- Published: 1957 (Ballantine Books)
- Publication place: United States of America

The Hanging Tree is a 1957 novella written by Dorothy M. Johnson. It follows the arrival of Doctor Joseph Frail to a small gold rush town in Montana, 1873. Elizabeth, the sole survivor of a carriage robbery falls under his care. When the town strikes big on gold, a mob forms and seeks to lynch Frail. Elizabeth leverages her gold in exchange for his life.

== Publication history ==
Johnson's literary agent, Elizabeth Otis, of McIntosh & Otis literary agent in New York, initially urged Johnson to divide the novel into a serialized magazine series, however Johnson believed that "a writer is not an author until he has produced a book." Collier's rebuffed a serial offer, stating that "there just isn't sufficient physical action and taut enough emotional suspense to break this up into parts." Eventually, Johnson and Otis cut the word count down from over 63,000 to just 39,000 words, at which point Ballantine Books agreed to publish The Hanging Tree.

== Film Adaptation ==
Before the end of summer of 1957, Martin Jurow purchased the rights to the novella to turn it into an American Western Production. The Hanging Tree was directed by Delmer Daves, starring Gary Cooper, Maria Schell, George C. Scott and Karl Malden, which was released by Warner Bros.
