= Triumphs of a Man Called Horse =

1983 film

- Theatrical release poster
- Directed by: John Hough
- Screenplay by: Ken Blackwell; Carlos Aured
- Story by: Jack DeWitt
- Based on: Characters by Dorothy M. Johnson; Jack DeWitt
- Produced by: Derek Gibson
- Starring: Richard Harris; Michael Beck
- Cinematography: John Alcott; John Cabrera
- Edited by: Roy Watts
- Music by: Georges Garvarentz
- Production companies: Estudios Churubusco; Hesperia Films; Sandy Howard Productions
- Distributed by: Jensen Farley Pictures (United States); Estudios Churubusco (Mexico); Astral Films (Canada)
- Release date: 1983
- Running time: 86 minutes
- Countries: United States; Mexico; Canada; Spain
- Language: English

Triumphs of a Man Called Horse is a 1983 Western film directed by John Hough and written by Ken Blackwell and Carlos Aured. It is the second and final sequel to A Man Called Horse (1970), following The Return of a Man Called Horse (1976). Richard Harris reprises his role as the titular character, starring with Michael Beck, Ana De Sade, Vaughn Armstrong, Anne Seymour, and Buck Taylor.

Released theatrically by Jensen Farley Pictures, it received generally negative reviews, with critics negatively comparing it to its predecessors.

== Plot ==
Now in his 60s, Man Called Horse is the chief of the Sioux and is much hated by white men because "many's a white man's died from the tricks he taught the Sioux". The government calls Horse to peace talks, but a mysterious person-in-hiding with a rifle assassinates Horse and his bodyguard after the meeting.

His son Koda, who was raised among the Sioux, but was sent away to attend school in the East, returns to deal both with white settlers encroaching on the Sioux lands and with his own people, who want to go to war. Koda also meets an attractive young woman named Red Wing who happens to be a Crow, the traditional enemy of the Sioux. In the end, it is revealed that Horse was murdered by a phony preacher who wanted to start a war so he could get the Sioux's land. Koda and Red Wing have a traditional showdown with the preacher and his henchmen, with Koda and Red Wing victorious. At the end, Koda sees the triumphant spirit of his father in full chief regalia.

== Cast ==
- Richard Harris as Shunkawakan / John Morgan
- Michael Beck as Koda
- Ana De Sade as Red Wing
- Vaughn Armstrong as Captain Cummings
- Anne Seymour as Elk Woman
- Buck Taylor as Sgt. Bridges
- Lautaro Murúa as Perkins
- Simón Andreu as Grance
- Roger Cudney as Durand
- Jerry Gatlin as Winslow
- John Davis Chandler as Mason
- Miguel Ángel Fuentes as Big Bear
- Sebastian Ligarde as Mullins
- Erika Carlsson as Essie
- Anaís de Melo as Dorothy

== Production ==
An international co-production film between The United States, Mexico, Spain and Canada. Richard Harris' first choice to direct was Sam Peckinpah, with whom he had previously worked with on Major Dundee (1965). Due to Peckinpah's infamously erratic behavior, he was replaced by John Hough. This was the veteran director's first and only Western.

Like its two predecessors, Triumphs was shot primarily in Sonora and Chihuahua, Mexico, with additional photography taking place in Spain and second unit photography in Red Lodge, Montana.

== Reception ==
TV Guide gave the film one star: "This rip-off sequel to A Man Called Horse (1970) and The Return of a Man Called Horse (1976) cashes in on the popularity of its predecessors. Richard Harris appears briefly as the "Man Called Horse", an aging Englishman who has headed a Sioux tribe for 30 years...The film is anything but a triumph".
