= Jack DeWitt (writer) =

American screenwriter

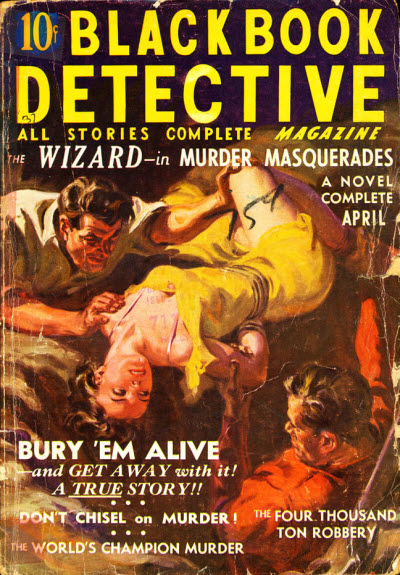
DeWitt's "Bury ’Em Alive" was the cover story in the April 1937 issue of Black Book Detective.

Jack DeWitt (1900–1981) was an American screenwriter.

He wrote a number of films for producer Sandy Howard.

== Select filmography ==
- International Lady (1942)
- Beyond the Blue Horizon (1942)
- Don Ricardo Returns (1946)
- Bells of San Fernando (1947)
- Louisiana (1947)
- The Return of Rin Tin Tin (1947)
- Louisiana (1947)
- Rocky (1948)
- Bomba, the Jungle Boy (1949)
- Canadian Pacific (1949)
- The Lost Volcano (1950)
- The Highwayman (1951)
- Boston Blackie (1951–53) (TV series) – various episodes
- Dick Turpin's Ride (1952)
- Fargo (1952)
- Big Town (1952) (TV series) – story for 13 episodes
- Battles of Chief Pontiac (1952)
- Son of Belle Starr (1953)
- Gun Belt (1953)
- Khyber Patrol(1954)
- Sitting Bull (1954)
- The Bamboo Prison (1954)
- Women's Prison (1955)
- Cell 2455, Death Row (1954)
- Cheyenne (TV series) -episode "The Last Train West" (1956)
- Crossroads (1956) (TV series) – episode "The Rabbi Davis Story"
- The Beast of Hollow Mountain (1956)
- Rumble on the Docks (1956)
- Portland Exposé (1957)
- Oregon Passage (1957)
- The Gray Ghost (1957–58) – TV series – writer and story supervisor various episodes
- Wolf Larsen (1958)
- The Purple Gang (1959)
- Bronco – episode "Montana Passage" (1960)
- Five Guns to Tombstone (1960)
- Jack of Diamonds (1967)
- One Step to Hell (1968)
- A Man Called Horse (1970)
- Man in the Wilderness (1971)
- The Neptune Factor (1973)
- Together Brothers (1974)
- Sky Riders (1976)
- The Return of a Man Called Horse (1976)
- Triumphs of a Man Called Horse (1983) – story

=== Unmade ===
- The Al Capone Story (1957)
- The Coastwatchers (1959)
