= Jack of Diamonds (1967 film) =

1967 film by Don Taylor

- Original film poster by Robert McGinness
- Directed by: Don Taylor
- Written by: Jack DeWitt; Sandy Howard additional dialogue Robert L. Joseph
- Based on: a story by Sandy Howard
- Produced by: Sandy Howard; Helmut Jedele executive Lutz Hengst
- Starring: George Hamilton; Joseph Cotten; Marie Laforêt; Maurice Evans; Carroll Baker; Zsa Zsa Gabor; Lilli Palmer; Wolfgang Preiss; Karl Lieffen
- Cinematography: Ernst Wild
- Edited by: Hannes Nikel
- Music by: Peter Thomas
- Production companies: Sandy Howard Productions; Bavaria
- Distributed by: Metro-Goldwyn-Mayer
- Release dates: October 25, 1967 (Los Angeles); November 10, 1967 (New York)
- Running time: 108 minutes
- Countries: United States; West Germany
- Language: English
- Budget: $1.3 million

Jack of Diamonds is a 1967 crime drama film directed by Don Taylor filmed in West Germany and released by Metro-Goldwyn-Mayer. It stars George Hamilton in the lead role as an international cat burglar and jewel thief.

== Plot ==
Jeff Hill, a master thief known as the Jack of Diamonds, skillfully uses his acrobatic ability and cleverness to perform a series of jewel heists that target glamorous film stars such as Zsa Zsa Gabor, Carroll Baker and Lilli Palmer. While executing a heist on a luxury liner, Jeff encounters and wrestles with an unknown competitor in the dark who is attempting to steal the jewels that Jeff is pursuing. Jeff abseils down the side of the ship to a waiting boat, and his rival soon follows, a beautiful woman named Olga who boards her own escape boat.

Jeff visits with his mentor, the Ace of Diamonds, who advises him to quit while he is ahead. Jeff meets Olga, at first not realizing that it was she with whom he fought aboard the ship, and she introduces him to her father Nicolai, an old friend of the Ace of Diamonds. Nicolai persuades Jeff to team with Olga to rob a heavily guarded vault containing a priceless diamond necklace. Jeff first surreptitiously enters the police station to access the code for the vault door. Nicolai, Olga, Jeff and the Ace plan the robbery meticulously, studying accurate models of the building and outlining the actual dimensions of the guarded area with tape on the floor of Jeff's mansion.

On the night of the heist, Jeff gains access to the vault despite the presence of many police officers nearby. He swaps the jewel necklace for an exact copy but just as he is about to leave the vault, he inadvertently trips an alarm. The police spring into action and pursue Jeff and Olga, but Ace emerges at the top of the building intentionally in full view of the police searchlights so that he may be captured while Jeff and Olga slip away in the darkness with the jewels still safely stashed.

Jeff approaches Interpol inspector Wilhelm Von Schenk with a proposition to free Ace and avoid prison time for himself. He reveals that he has replaced many of the world's most famous jewels with identical copies, and the victims are not even aware that they now possess fakes. He offers to secretly return all of the stolen jewels and end his career as a thief if Von Schenk, who wishes to avoid the repercussions that will ensue if the fakes are discovered, will allow Jeff and the Ace to go free.

The stolen jewels are secretly restored with the same cunning techniques used to steal them. Jeff, now penniless, must leave his spacious mansion and his glamorous life as an international thief. However, Nicolai reveals that he has withheld one genuine diamond that he presents as a gift for Jeff and Olga.

== Cast ==
- George Hamilton as Jeff Hill
- Joseph Cotten as Ace
- Marie Laforêt as Olga Vodkine
- Maurice Evans as Nicolai
- Wolfgang Preiss as Wilhelm Von Schenk
- Alexander Hegarth as Brugger
- Karl Lieffen as Helmut
- Charlie Hickman as Lieutenant Gilder
- Zsa Zsa Gabor as Herself
- Carroll Baker as Herself
- Lilli Palmer as Herself

== Production ==
The film is based on a story by producer Sandy Howard, who said before production that the film "may be reminiscent of other films, but we feel, even though we have no releasing deal as yet, that it will be different in style and its budget—$1.3 million—makes it an honest and safe bet."

The film was originally to be directed by Herschel Daugherty, who was replaced by Don Taylor. Oscar Homolka was intended to play Nicolai but was replaced by Maurice Evans.

== Reception ==
In a contemporary review for The New York Times, critic Bosley Crowther wrote: "Unless you have a particularly urgent reason for wanting to watch George Hamilton modeling a dazzling assortment of the most beautifully cut men's clothes, including a black skin-tight jump-suit of the sort every well-dressed cat-burglar should wear, you may safely skip 'Jack of Diamonds' ... It is strictly low-grade "Topkapi," done up in expensive high-style."

Reviewer Kevin Thomas of the Los Angeles Times called the film "a peculiarly depressing little picture" and wrote: "Such a plot is so formula by now that it should either be kidded or used to make some larger point. Throughout, you can't help remembering all these stars have been seen in much worthier circumstances and that who they are off the screen is so much more interesting than what they're doing on it."

Roger Ebert wrote: "Jack of Diamonds is a harmless exercise in how not to make a suspense adventure. I can't think of any reason to go and see it, unless you're a George Hamilton fan. He's pleasant enough, I guess."

== See also ==
- List of American films of 1967
