= Sky Riders =

- Directed by: Douglas Hickox
- Written by: Jack DeWitt; Stanley Mann; Garry Michael White
- Screenplay by: Jack DeWitt; Greg MacGillivray
- Produced by: Terry Morse Jr. Sandy Howard
- Starring: James Coburn; Susannah York; Robert Culp
- Cinematography: Jim Freeman; Greg MacGillivray; Ousama Rawi
- Edited by: Malcolm Cooke
- Music by: Lalo Schifrin
- Production company: 20th Century Fox
- Distributed by: 20th Century Fox
- Release date: March 26, 1976
- Running time: 91 min
- Country: United States
- Language: English
- Box office: $4.9 million (worldwide)

Sky Riders (also known as Assault on the Forbidden Fortress) is a 1976 American action film directed by Douglas Hickox and starring James Coburn, Susannah York and Robert Culp.

The rescue sequences were filmed in Meteora in Greece where the finale of the later James Bond film For Your Eyes Only was also set later in 1981.

On January 17, 2012 the film was released on DVD through Shout! Factory as part of a double feature with The Last Hard Men.

== Plot ==
In Greece, the wife and children of American businessman Jonas Bracken are kidnapped by a radical group, the World Activist Revolutionary Army, who demand a ransom of $5 million for their safe return. Bracken raises the ransom money from selling off parts of his business empire, but the kidnappers then make further demands, requiring Bracken to use the money to purchase arms and ammunition for them. Inspector Nikolidis of the Greek police is put in charge of case. Jim McCabe, a smuggler who is Ellen Bracken's ex-husband and father to their son, reads about the kidnapping in the newspapers and meets with Bracken.

Police trace a radio signal used by the kidnappers and close in on the location, only to discover it is a decoy. A booby-trap detonates, killing several officers including Nikolidis's nephew. Nikolidis and McCabe agree that the kidnappers must be stopped, perhaps by any means. The kidnappers send a photograph of Ellen and the children as proof that they are still alive and, without the police knowing, McCabe uses a contact to trace their location based on a painted fresco in the background of the photo. He discovers that they are being held in a remote cliff-top monastery.

McCabe finds a hang glider flying circus and hires them to take part in a rescue mission. When Nikolidis discovers that McCabe has gone to free Bracken's family, the police decide to launch their own rescue plan and move in. McCabe's team use their hang gliders to infiltrate the monastery and free the hostages, but are discovered as they are leaving. While a gun battle ensues between the kidnappers and the police at the monastery, McCabe's team and the hostages are pursued and eventually escape on their hang gliders. The head kidnapper chases them in a helicopter, which McCabe forces to crash land. The head kidnapper then commits suicide rather than be captured and Bracken is reunited with his family.

== Cast ==
- James Coburn as Jim McCabe
- Susannah York as Ellen Bracken
- Robert Culp as Jonas Bracken
- Charles Aznavour as Insp. Nikolidis
- Harry Andrews as Auerbach
- John Beck as Ben
- Zouzou as Female terrorist
- Kenneth Griffith as Wasserman
- Werner Pochath as Terrorist #1
- Anthony Antypas as Dimitri
- Telis Zotos as Bracken's secretary
- Nikos Tsachiridis as Gatekeeper
- Ernie F. Orsatti as Joe
- Barbara Trentham as Della
- Henry Brown as Martin

== Production ==
Coburn's casting was announced in May 1975. The film was part of a slate of productions from Sandy Howard.

The movie was shot in Greece under the title of Hostages.

After an explosion on the set of Sky Riders in which a Greek electrician died, producer Terry Morse Jr. was arrested and producer Sandy Howard was detained for several weeks. A $250,000 out-of-court settlement was made, which one Variety article called a "bribe" so the crew member responsible would not be imprisoned.

== Reception ==
The film was a failure at the box office in the US but did better internationally.

Howard hired Jack Hill to write a sequel. He later said "I pitched them my idea, which they thought was good, and I wrote the script. Well, it turned out that the movie was a big flop and no one could understand why. I knew why, it was because they had the theory that it should be wall to wall action and there is nothing more boring." Hill then wrote City on Fire and Death Ship for Howard.

In 2025, The Hollywood Reporter listed Sky Riders as having the best stunts of 1976.
