= Freddie Fields =

American theatrical agent and film producer (1923–2007)

- Born: Fred Feldman; July 12, 1923; Ferndale, New York, U.S.
- Died: December 11, 2007 (aged 84); Beverly Hills, California, U.S.
- Occupations: Producer, agent
- Spouses: Edith Fellows (m. 1946; div. 1955) Polly Bergen (m. 1957; div. 1975) Cherie Latimer (m. 1976; div. 1977) Corinna Tsopei (m. 1981)
- Children: 4, including Kathy Fields

Freddie Fields (July 12, 1923 – December 11, 2007), born Fred Feldman, was an American theatrical agent and film producer.

== Biography ==
Fields was born to a Jewish family, the brother of band leader Shep Fields.

Field's obituary in Variety magazine described his early career:

After a stint in the Coast Guard, he joined the Abbe Greshler agency in 1943; there he worked with Dean Martin and Jerry Lewis. He was wooed away by MCA in 1946, bringing Lewis and Martin with him, and rose through the ranks to become head of its TV department. He packaged such vaudevillian and radio talents as Phil Silvers, George Burns and Gracie Allen and Jackie Gleason for television.

In 1960, Fields and fellow former MCA agent David Begelman founded the international talent agency Creative Management Associates (CMA). At CMA, Fields and Begelman pioneered the movie "package", where the talent agency put their stars, directors and writers together on a single project.

CMA developed numerous agents, including Sue Mengers, Mike Medavoy, Sam Cohn, and Jeff Berg (who became president in 1979). CMA was instrumental in the development of such stars as Woody Allen, Robert Redford, Peter Sellers, Steve McQueen and later Steven Spielberg, George Lucas, Burt Bacharach, Neil Young, and Jack Carter, and into the 1980s promoted the likes of Richard Gere and Mel Gibson. While at CMA, he was involved with numerous blockbuster films, including Butch Cassidy and the Sundance Kid, American Graffiti, and Star Wars. Fields played a key role in the merger of CMA with the International Famous Agency to form International Creative Management (ICM).

Starting in 1969, Fields was a partner in the First Artists Company with Paul Newman, Steve McQueen, Dustin Hoffman, Sidney Poitier, and Barbra Streisand. While First Artists only lasted for about ten years, it was unique in that it owned the films it produced, such as The Getaway (1972).

In 1978, a New York Magazine article alleged that Fields and Begelman had embezzled money from Judy Garland when Begelman was her agent.

Fields later served as president of MGM and United Artists.

== Personal life ==
Fields was married four times. He was survived by his wife, former Miss Universe 1964, Corinna Tsopei, and by two adopted children by his former wife, actress Polly Bergen. He also was married to actress Edith Fellows, who died June 26, 2011. Kathy Fields is their child.

== Filmography ==
He was a producer in all films unless otherwise noted.

=== Film ===
Year	Film	Credit	Notes
1976	Lipstick		
1977	Handle with Care		
1977	Looking for Mr. Goodbar		
1980	American Gigolo	Executive producer	
1980	Wholly Moses!		
1981	Escape to Victory		
1982	The Year of Living Dangerously	Executive producer	Uncredited
1985	Fever Pitch		
1986	Poltergeist II: The Other Side	Executive producer	
1986	American Anthem	Executive producer	
1986	Crimes of the Heart		
1989	Millennium	Executive producer	
1989	Glory		Final film as a producer

Miscellaneous crew

Year	Film	Role
1982	The Year of Living Dangerously	Presenter

=== Television ===
Year	Title	Credit	Notes
1962	The Judy Garland Show	Executive producer	Television special
1989	Glory	Executive producer	Television special
1996	The Montel Williams Show	Executive producer	
