= The Neptune Factor =

1973 film by Daniel Petrie

- Directed by: Daniel Petrie
- Written by: Jack DeWitt
- Produced by: Sandy Howard (as Sanford Howard)
- Starring: Ben Gazzara; Yvette Mimieux; Walter Pidgeon; Ernest Borgnine
- Cinematography: Harry Makin
- Edited by: Stan Cole
- Music by: Lalo Schifrin
- Distributed by: 20th Century Fox
- Release date: August 3, 1973
- Running time: 98 minutes
- Countries: Canada; United States
- Language: English
- Budget: $2.5 million
- Box office: $2,750,000 (US/ Canada)

The Neptune Factor, also known as The Neptune Disaster, is a 1973 science fiction film directed by Daniel Petrie, featuring underwater cinematography by Paul Herbermann. The film's special effects utilized underwater photography of miniatures with actual marine life.

== Plot ==
Marine scientists prepare to leave their underwater ocean lab after an extended stay performing oceanographic research. An underwater earthquake interrupts their plans. Dr. Andrews enlists experimental sub captain Adrien Blake to survey the damage and rescue the oceanauts. He brings along chief diver "Mack" MacKay and Dr. Leah Jansen, fiancée of one of the scientists.

Blake finds the lab has been ripped from its moorings and has tumbled down an unexplored, deep sea trench, presumably intact. With the lab's reserve air supply dwindling, the team descends into the unexplored trench and finds an incredible ecosystem populated with monstrously oversized fish.

After surviving encounters with unfriendly denizens, they find the lab partially intact, the surviving scientists breathing from scuba tanks and fending off giant, hungry eels. Diver Moulton sacrifices his life distracting the eels in order to enable the others to be rescued. The submarine returns to the surface with the two rescued scientists.

== Cast ==
- Ben Gazzara as Commander Adrian Blake
- Yvette Mimieux as Dr. Leah Jansen
- Walter Pidgeon as Dr. Samuel Andrews
- Ernest Borgnine as chief diver Don MacKay
- Donnelly Rhodes as diver Bob Cousins
- Chris Wiggins as Captain Williams
- Michael J. Reynolds as Dr. Hal Hamilton
- Mark Walker as diver Dave Moulton
- Leslie Carlson as Brigs, Triton Radioman
- Stuart Gillard as diver Phil Bradley
- David Yorston as diver Stephens

== Production ==
Sandy Howard, a film producer from the United States, brought the idea of The Neptune Factor to David Perlmutter and Harold Greenberg, who chose to produce the film. Howard wanted the film to be made in the United States, but Greenberg was able to have the film shot in Canada. The film was based on an original story by writer Jack DeWitt. Gazzara and Borgnine's casting was announced in August 1972. The movie has a subtitle of "An Underwater Odyssey".

The film was shot from 25 September to 16 December 1972, on a budget of $2,500,000 (equivalent to $18,744,292 in 2025). The Canadian Film Development Corporation contributed $200,000 to the film's budget under the demand that Daniel Petrie be the director.

The nature of the Oceanlab underwater facility bears a resemblance to real-world projects of the 1960s such as the ConShelf Two project of Jacques Cousteau, NASA's NEEMO, and the US Navy SEALAB.

== Release ==
The film was released on 26 June 1973, in Ottawa. The film premiered in Florida in May 1973 and grossed $203,000 in its first four days.

== Reception ==
TV Guide gave the film one out of 5 stars, stating that while its underwater photography was well done, the film was predictable, the characters stereotypes and the story lacking. The New York Times enjoyed the "nutty" photography and "what may be filmdom's most confidently unconvincing Southern accent" courtesy of Ben Gazzara. In The Magazine of Fantasy & Science Fiction, Baird Searles lumped the film with The Poseidon Adventure and called the writing, cinematography, editing, and music "execrable".

== See also ==
- List of American films of 1973
- List of underwater science fiction works
- Sealab 2020, a 1972 animated series about a futuristic underwater research base

== Works cited ==
- Spencer, Michael (2003). Hollywood North: Creating the Canadian Motion Picture Industry. Cantos International Publishing. ISBN 289594007X.
- Turner, D. John, ed. (1987). Canadian Feature Film Index: 1913-1985. Canadian Film Institute. ISBN 0660533642.
