= Robin Dalton =

Australian literary agent, film producer, and memoirist (1920–2022)

Robin Dalton AM
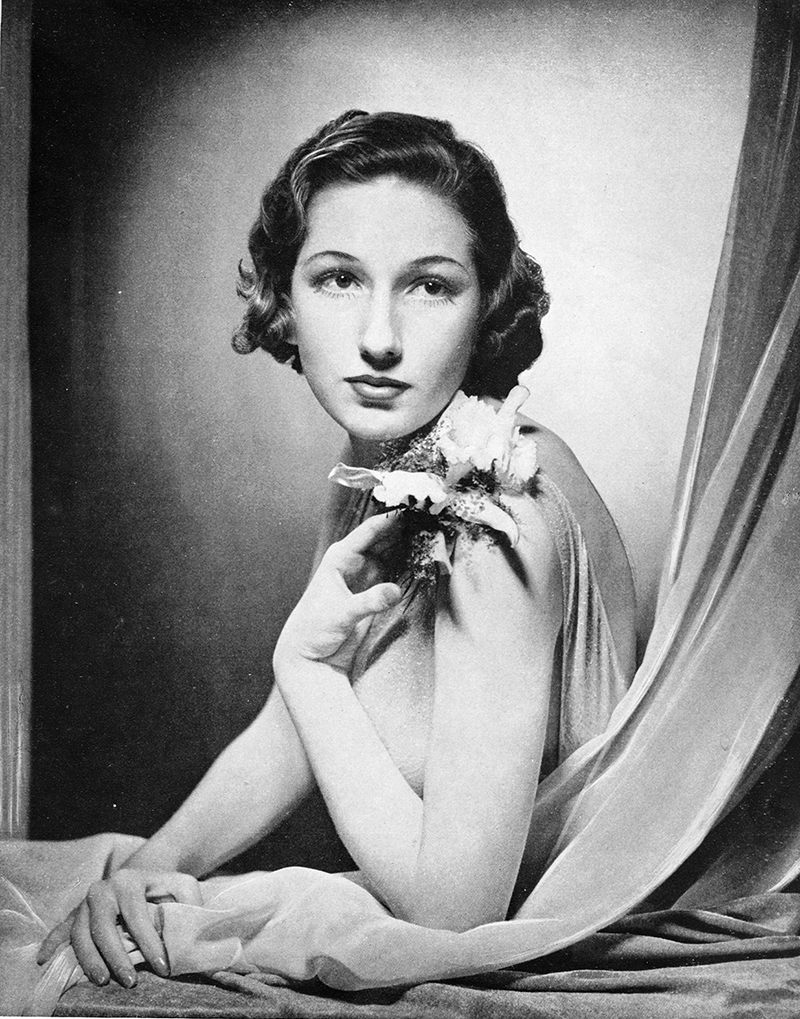
- Robin Dalton (née Eakin) in The Home magazine, September 1938. Photo: Noel Rubie
- Born: Robin Ann Eakin; 22 December 1920; Sydney, Australia
- Died: 8 July 2022 (aged 101); England
- Occupations: Literary agent, film producer
- Spouses: John Spencer (m. 1940; div. 1940) Emmet Dalton (m. 1953, died) William Fairchild (m. 1992; died 2000)
- Children: 2

Robin Ann Dalton AM (née Eakin; 22 December 1920 – 8 July 2022) was an Australian literary agent, film producer, and memoirist who lived in London for most of her adult life. She was also a journalist, television performer, and intelligence agent.

== Life and career ==
Robin Ann Eakin was born in 1920 in Sydney, an only child, and grew up in Kings Cross, New South Wales. Her father was a doctor whose clientele included elements of the Sydney underworld as well as more respectable members of society. She was frequently in the social pages of Sydney newspapers in her late teens. A 1940 marriage to a barrister named John Spencer did not last more than a few months, as he divorced her on the grounds of adultery.

In 1946, she flew to London. While in Australia she had met David Mountbatten, 3rd Marquess of Milford Haven, Prince Philip's cousin and best man at his wedding to Princess Elizabeth, and in London their affair continued, but they were prevented from marrying by her status as a divorcee, although he married divorcee Romaine Simpson in 1950. She entered high society and met numerous international celebrities, which led to her doing espionage work for the Thai Government.

She then met an Irish doctor named Emmet Dalton, whom she married in 1953. They had two children, Lisa and Seamus, but Emmet died suddenly at age 33 during heart surgery. In 1963 she started a life with William Fairchild, who became her third husband in 1992 and died in 2000.

Robin Dalton became a literary agent, acting for writers such as Joan Collins, Margaret Drabble, Arthur Miller, Iris Murdoch, Edna O'Brien, Sonia Orwell, John Osborne, Ruth Prawer Jhabvala, Bernice Rubens, David Storey, Ben Travers, Arnold Wesker and Tennessee Williams; and film makers such as Laurence Olivier, Louis Malle and Peter Weir. She sold her agency, Robin Dalton Associates, to American businessman Marvin Josephson's International Famous Agency, in 1971.

She produced such films as Emma's War (1987), Madame Sousatzka (1988), Country Life (1994) and Oscar and Lucinda (1997).

== Honours ==
She was appointed a Member of the Order of Australia (AM) in 2013, "for significant service to the film industry as a producer, literary agent and author, and as a mentor to emerging actors and writers".

== Bibliography ==
=== Memoirs ===
- Aunts Up the Cross (1965)
- An Incidental Memoir (1998)
- One Leg Over (2017)

=== Fiction ===
- My Relations (written at age 8, published in 2015, aged 94)
