= PLBY Group =

American global media and lifestyle company

PLBY Group, Inc.
- Formerly: Playboy Enterprises, Inc.
- Type: Public
- Traded as: Nasdaq: PLBY
- Industry: Lifestyle; Mass media; Wellness
- Founded: 1953; 73 years ago, in Chicago, Illinois, U.S.
- Founder: Hugh Hefner
- Headquarters: Chicago, Illinois, U.S. (1953–2012); Los Angeles, California, U.S. (2012–present)
- Area served: Global
- Key people: Suhail Rizvi (chairman); Ben Kohn (president and CEO)
- Products: Playboy; Playboy TV (1982–2011); Playboy Online; Centerfold.com
- Revenue: ▲$147.7 million (2020)
- Operating income: ▲$13.61 million (2020)
- Net income: ▼ −$5.27 million (2020)
- Total assets: ▼$412.13 million (2020)
- Total equity: ▼$83.02 million (2020)
- Number of employees: 211 (2020)
- Subsidiaries: Playboy Enterprises; Lovers; Centerfold.com
- Website: playboyenterprises.com

PLBY Group, Inc. is an American global media and lifestyle company founded by Hugh Hefner as Playboy Enterprises, Inc. to oversee the Playboy magazine and related assets. It is currently headquartered in Los Angeles, California.

The company is focused on four primary business lines: Sexual Wellness, Style & Apparel, Gaming and Lifestyle, and Beauty & Grooming. Today, PLBY Group, together with its subsidiaries, engages in the development and distribution of content, products and high-profile events that embody both "eroticism and fine art", and apparel retailing. It is in the top twenty most licensed brands globally.

== History ==
Playboy was founded in 1953 by Hugh Hefner. The company first went public on the New York Stock Exchange in 1973.

Sales of Playboy magazine peaked in 1972 at over 7 million copies. By 2015, the circulation had fallen to 800,000. The company completed its shift to consumer products in 2020 with the shuttering of the magazine division, and is now known to generate more than $3 billion in consumer spending annually across 180 countries.

Playboy Enterprises, Inc. made its initial public offering on November 3, 1971, at $23.50.

Playboy ran forty Playboy Club properties from 1960 to 1986 and operated casinos in England from the mid-1960s to 1981, when they lost their operating license. Playboy also operated a casino in Nassau, Bahamas, from 1978 to 1982. From 1981 to 1984, the company was a partner in the Playboy Hotel and Casino in Atlantic City, New Jersey. Playboy Enterprises was denied a permanent New Jersey gaming license and was forced to sell out to its partner, which changed the name of the hotel/casino to the Atlantis Hotel and Casino. The company returned to the nightlife business with the Playboy Club at the Palms Casino Resort in Las Vegas, which opened in 2006 and closed in 2012. Other Playboy Clubs opened in Cancun, Macau, and London in 2010 and 2011. Meanwhile, the company said it would open at least three Playboy stores in each of the next three years.

In 1959, the company formed Alta Loma Entertainment (formerly Playboy Productions from 1959 to 1988, and Alta Loma Productions from 1988 to 1999), to produce movies and television shows. The first project was Playboy's Penthouse, a television show on WBKB-TV, which was followed by Playboy After Dark, a television series that ran for two seasons, and the format was revived as After Hours in 1989.

In 1982, Playboy Enterprises founded Playboy Home Video (later Playboy Home Entertainment). At first, the Playboy Premiere titles were distributed by MGM/UA Home Video, with others going to CBS/Fox Video, but the label changed hands to other distributors since 1985.

The Age reported in October 2008 that, for the first-time ever, Hugh Hefner was selling tickets to his celebrity-filled parties to offset his cash-flow problems due to setbacks Playboy Enterprises had suffered, including decreasing Playboy circulation, decreasing stock value, and ventures that have yet to turn a profit. Christie Hefner released a memo to employees about her efforts to streamline the company's operations, including eliminating its DVD division and laying off staff.

In March 2011, founder Hugh Hefner succeeded in a bid to take Playboy Enterprises private after 40 years as a publicly traded company. He partnered with private equity firm Rizvi Traverse.

Playboy Enterprises closed its former headquarters in the top office floors of 680 N. Lake Shore Drive in Chicago, Illinois, in April 2012. In January 2013, the company said it employed 165.

In 2018, less than a year after Hugh Hefner's death, his estate sold its remaining Playboy shares of 33%, worth $35 million, to Icon Acquisition Holdings LP. The money was split between Hefner's widow and his four children.

In March 2020, CEO Ben Kohn announced that the Spring issue of the magazine would be the last to be printed, and the publication would be online-only going forward.

In October 2020, Playboy Enterprises announced a reverse merger with Mountain Crest Acquisition Corp, a special purpose acquisition company (SPAC). On February 11, 2021, PLBY Group, Inc. completed its merger and began trading on the Nasdaq stock market under the PLBY ticker. PLBY Group, Inc. and its subsidiaries, including Playboy Enterprises, is headed by Ben Kohn, chief executive officer, president and director. In 2025, Playboy announced it was moving its headquarters to Miami Beach, Florida and opening a new club there.

=== Segments ===
The company has three reportable segments: Licensing, which includes licensing of Playboy brands to third parties; Direct-to-Consumer, including sales of third-party products through its owned-and-operated e-commerce platforms; and Digital Subscriptions and Content, including the sale of subscriptions to Playboy programming and trademark licensing for online gaming products.

As of the 2020 re-organization the business had four main market categories:

- Sexual Wellness, comprising own-branded lingerie and sexual amenities including CBD products. This segment contributed over 40% to revenue in 2020.
- Style & Apparel, comprising licensed fashion sales globally, especially in China, where it is the leading men's fashion brand with over 3500 stores. This segment contributed around 52% of revenue in 2020.
- Beauty & Grooming, comprising skincare, beauty and grooming products. This segment contributed around 2% to revenue in 2020.

The company's Playboy Foundation provides grants to non-profit groups involved in fighting censorship and researching human sexuality.

The company licenses the Playboy name, the Rabbit Head design and other images, trademarks, and artwork to "appear on a wide range of consumer products including apparel, accessories, footwear, lingerie, jewelry, fragrances and home fashions." Its licensed products generate "more than $3 billion in global sales in more than 180 countries." The company's trademarks and copyrights are critical to the success and potential growth of its business as "Playboy is one of the most recognized, celebrated and popular consumer brands in the world." In 2019, Playboy ranked number 21 among the Top 150 Global Licensors by License Global magazine. As of 2013, the licensing accounts for about 65% of revenue.

PB Lifestyle Ltd. is promoted by Mumbai-based entrepreneurs. Following their interests in media and entertainment, PB Lifestyle Ltd. has signed the master and exclusive franchise/licensee agreement with Playboy Enterprises USA (for ten years) for the use of the Playboy brand in India for various businesses. PB Lifestyle representatives have also stated that the company will adapt the Playboy brand to suit India's decency standards and will not allow content/material that is deemed "lascivious or appealing to prurient interests".

Playboy first entered the Chinese market in a 1988 licensing deal with Hong Kong–based Chaifa Group. By the early 1990s, Licenses were divided into subcategories of products and sold to mainland manufacturers. The company claimed roughly 650 stores by 2003. This had grown to 3,100 by 2015. The company has attempted to open a club in Shanghai, once in 2004, and again in 2017. In May 2015, Playboy signed a 10-year licensing agreement with Handong United to manufacture and distribute fashion apparel.

== Subsidiaries ==
In December 2019, Playboy Enterprises acquired the online retailer Yandy for an undisclosed sum. In February 2021, PLBY announced the acquisition of the sexual wellness retailer Lovers for $25m in cash. In June 2021, PLBY Group acquired Australian-based lingerie chain Honey Birdette for US$333 million in cash and stock. In October 2021 PLBY Group acquired Dream, a social content platform that provides creators with tools to interact directly with their fans. This acquisition was used to support the launch of Playboys creator community Centerfold.com that went live on December 20, 2021.
