= Louisiana (1947 film) =

1947 film

- Theatrical release poster
- Directed by: Phil Karlson
- Written by: Jack DeWitt; Steve Healey; Scott Darling; Vick Knight
- Produced by: Lindsley Parsons
- Starring: Jimmie Davis; Margaret Lindsay; John Gallaudet
- Cinematography: William A. Sickner
- Edited by: Ace Herman
- Music by: Edward J. Kay
- Production company: Monogram Pictures
- Distributed by: Monogram Pictures
- Release date: November 15, 1947
- Running time: 85 minutes
- Country: United States
- Language: English

Louisiana is a 1947 American drama film directed by Phil Karlson and starring Jimmie Davis, Margaret Lindsay and John Gallaudet. Davis, a singer and Governor of Louisiana, came to Karlson, wanting to be in movies and Monogram Pictures agreed to finance one based on his life. Karlson says the film helped Davis get re-elected.

== Plot ==
The music-loving fourteen-year-old son of a Louisiana sharecropper determines to get a good education. He goes on to enjoy success as a gospel singer and culminates his rise by being elected Governor.

== Cast ==
- Jimmie Davis as Jimmie Davis
- Margaret Lindsay as Alvern Adams
- John Gallaudet as Charlie Mitchell
- Freddie Stewart as Freddie Stewart
- Dottye Brown as Laura
- Ralph Reed as Jimmie Davis as a Boy
- Russell Hicks as Fred Astor
- Lee 'Lasses' White as Old Timer
- John Harmon as Steve
- Tristram Coffin as Tomlins
- Eddy Waller as Mr. Davis
- Mary Field as Mrs. Davis
- Joseph Crehan as Neilson
- Charles Lane as McCormack
