= Creative Management Associates =

International talent booking agency

- Type: Private
- Industry: Talent agency
- Founded: 1960; 66 years ago
- Founders: Freddie Fields and David Begelman
- Defunct: 1975; 51 years ago
- Fate: Merged with International Famous Agency to form International Creative Management
- Key people: Richard Shepherd

Creative Management Associates (CMA) was an American talent agency. Co-founded by Freddie Fields and David Begelman, CMA was instrumental in the development of movie stars, prominent directors, and popular musicians.

CMA is credited with pioneering the movie "package", where the talent agency put their stars, directors, and writers together on a single project. The agency was deeply involved with numerous blockbuster films, including Butch Cassidy and the Sundance Kid, American Graffiti, and Star Wars.

CMA was one of two agencies that formed International Creative Management in 1975.

== History ==
CMA was founded as a boutique agency in 1960 by Fields and Begelman. (Both Begelman and Fields had previously worked at the Music Corporation of America.) One of CMA's first partners was producer Richard Shepherd. Harvey Orkin, who won an Emmy award as a writer for The Phil Silvers Show, headed a creative services department and represented, at various times, Peter Burton, Peter Sellers and Patricia Neal. While representing CMA clients in London, Orkin regularly appeared on Not So Much a Programme, More a Way of Life and co-wrote the Lionel Bart musical Twang!.

In 1968, CMA absorbed fellow talent agency General Artists Corporation (GAC) (with the parent company called "GAC, Inc.").

Begelman left CMA in 1973 to take over the floundering Columbia Pictures, along with Orkin, who died in 1975.

On December 30, 1974, Fields sold the agency to Marvin Josephson's International Famous Agency (IFA); the two companies merged to become International Creative Management (ICM).

== Notable clients ==
CMA was instrumental in the development of such stars as Judy Garland, Henry Fonda, Marilyn Monroe, Robert Redford, Paul Newman, Steve McQueen, Peter Sellers, Dennis Hopper, Peter Fonda, Natalie Wood, Faye Dunaway, James Coburn, Al Pacino, Jack Carter, Liza Minnelli, Gregory Peck, Jackie Gleason, Fred Astaire, Woody Allen, and Barbra Streisand; producers and directors like Irwin Winkler, Steven Spielberg, and George Lucas; and popular musicians like Burt Bacharach and Neil Young.

== Notable employees and agents ==
CMA developed numerous agents, including Alan Ladd Jr., Sue Mengers, Guy McElwaine, David Geffen, Mike Medavoy, Michael Gruskoff, and Sam Cohn.

Medavoy became vice president of CMA's motion picture department in 1967, working with Spielberg and Francis Ford Coppola, among others. He left for International Famous Agency in 1970.
