= Association of Talent Agents =

US trade association of talent agencies

- Abbreviation: ATA
- Formation: 1937; 89 years ago
- Type: Non-profit trade association
- Location: Santa Monica, California, United States
- Members: 117 (2025)
- Executive Director: Karen Stuart
- Funding: Member fees
- Website: agentassociation.com

The Association of Talent Agents (ATA) is an American non-profit trade association representing talent agencies in the United States entertainment industry. ATA agencies represent the vast majority of artists working in the field, including actors, directors, writers, and other artists in film, stage, television, radio, commercial, literary work, and other entertainment enterprises.

== History ==
Established in 1937, ATA is a Los Angeles-based nonprofit trade association of over 100 talent agencies located primarily in the New York and Los Angeles areas. Today, over 100 agencies that serve the various branches of the entertainment industry are members of the Association of Talent Agents.

Originally known as the Artists' Managers Guild, the ATA was founded in the aftermath of National Labor Relations Board v Jones & Laughlin Steel Corporation, a US labor law case in which the Supreme Court upheld the National Labor Relations Act of 1935. This landmark piece of New Deal legislation, also known as the Wagner Act, guaranteed the right of private sector employees to unionize and bargain collectively, thus leading to the establishment of many of the unions and guilds that represent professionals working in the entertainment industry such as the Screen Actors Guild, Directors Guild of America, and Writers Guild of America.

In 2020 ATA closed its physical offices and currently operates out of a PO Box in Santa Monica (3019 Ocean Park Blvd, #344 Santa Monica, CA 90405) due to financial constraints.
