= Manu Tupou =

Fijian actor and director (1935–2004)

- Born: January 5, 1935; Lomaloma, Lau, Fiji
- Died: June 5, 2004 (aged 69); Los Angeles, California, United States
- Occupations: Actor, writer, director, teacher

Manu Tupou (January 5, 1935 – June 5, 2004) was an American-based Fijian actor, writer, director, and teacher.

== Early life ==
Manu Tupou was born on Lomaloma, Lau, Fiji Islands.

== Education ==
Tupou trained as an actor for 15 years in New York under Lee Strasberg, Stella Adler, Uta Hagen, Harold Clurman, and Sanford Meisner. He was an Honors graduate of the American Academy of Dramatic Arts New York and a senior life member of the Actors Studio in both New York and Hollywood. He received bachelor's degrees from the University of Hawaiʻi and the University of London.

Tupou studied at the Actors Studio at Carnegie Hall.

On a summer vacation, Tupou went to an audition on the advice of his girlfriend where he met director George Roy Hill but declined an offer as he was starting school soon. His first film, Hawaii, was released in 1966.

== Filmography ==
=== Stage ===
- Indians (1969): Sitting Bull
- Othello (1971): Othello
- Iphigenia at Aulis (1971): Agamemnon
- Captain Brassbound's Conversion (1972): Sidi El Assif
- Annie Get Your Gun (1977): Sitting Bull
- The Old Glory (1977): Assawamset/Ferryman
- Black Elk Speaks (1981): Black Elk

=== Film ===
- Hawaii (1966) - Narrator/Prince Keoki
- The Extraordinary Seaman (1969) - Seaman 1/C Lightfoot Star
- A Man Called Horse (1970) - Chief Yellowhand
- The Castaway Cowboy (1974) - Kimo
- Hurricane (1979) - Samolo
- Circuitry Man (1990) - Mahi
- Love Affair (1994) - Rau
- Payback (1999) - Pawnbroker
- Chief Zabu (2016) - Chief Henri Zabu
  - Posthumous release; shot in 1986 but not released until 2016

=== Television ===
- Hawaii Five-O (1971-1979) - Eddie Chu / Cappy Pahoa / Nahashi / Abraham Meleha / Tasi
- Barney Miller (1979) - Philip Azari
- Fantasy Island (1980) - Prester John
- Vega$ (1980) - Luke Kichi
- Magnum, P.I. (1981) - Charlie
- Voyagers! (1982) - Oxen
- Hill Street Blues (1986) - Jaggawala
- The A-Team (1986) - Chief Sikahama
- Batman: The Animated Series (1993) - Ubu (voice)
