= A Man Called Horse (short story) =

1968 short story by Dorothy M. Johnson

- First edition including story
- Author: Dorothy M. Johnson
- Language: English
- Genre: Short story
- Publisher: Ballantine Books
- Publication date: 1953 (collection)
- Publication place: United States
- Media type: Print (Paperback)
- ISBN: 0-8032-7585-4 (collection called Indian Country)
- OCLC: 32970185
- Dewey Decimal: 813/.54 20
- LC Class: PS3519.O233 I53 1995

A Man Called Horse by Dorothy M. Johnson was originally published as a short story in Collier's magazine, January 7, 1950, and was reprinted in 1953 as a short story in her book Indian Country. It was later made into a Wagon Train episode in 1958 and into a film in 1970 with Richard Harris in the lead role as John Morgan and Manu Tupou as Yellow Hand.

== Plot summary ==
The protagonist is a Boston aristocrat who is captured by a Native American tribe. Initially enslaved, he later comes to respect his captors' culture and gains their respect. He joins the tribe by showing his bravery and, later, gets back his dignity by marrying his owner's daughter, killing rival Indians and taking their horses. Taking the native name "Horse" (he was treated as a horse), he becomes a respected member of the tribe.
