= A Man Called Horse (film) =

1970 Western film by Elliot Silverstein

- Theatrical release poster design by Tom Jung
- Directed by: Elliot Silverstein
- Written by: Jack DeWitt
- Based on: "A Man Called Horse" by Dorothy M. Johnson
- Produced by: Sandy Howard
- Starring: Richard Harris; Judith Anderson; Jean Gascon; Manu Tupou; Corinna Tsopei; Dub Taylor; James Gammon
- Cinematography: Robert B. Hauser
- Edited by: Philip W. Anderson; Gene Fowler Jr.
- Music by: Leonard Rosenman
- Production companies: Cinema Center Films; Sandy Howard Productions
- Distributed by: National General Pictures (United States); Estudios Churubusco (Mexico)
- Release dates: March 1970 (Italy); April 24, 1970 (USA)
- Running time: 114 minutes
- Countries: United States; Mexico
- Languages: English; Sioux
- Budget: $5 million
- Box office: $6 million (US/Canada rentals) $44 million (worldwide by 1976)

A Man Called Horse is a 1970 Western film directed by Elliot Silverstein, produced by Sandy Howard, and written by Jack DeWitt. It is based on a short story of the same name by the Western writer Dorothy M. Johnson, first published in 1950 in Collier's magazine and again in 1968 in Johnson's book Indian Country. The basic story was used in a 1958 episode of the television series Wagon Train, also titled "A Man Called Horse". The film stars Richard Harris as the titular character, alongside Judith Anderson, Jean Gascon, Manu Tupou, Corinna Tsopei, Dub Taylor, and James Gammon.

Partially spoken in Sioux, the film tells the story of an English aristocrat who is captured by the Sioux people. The film was a Mexican-American co-production filmed on location in Arizona and the Mexican states of Durango and Sonora. It received generally positive critical reviews, and was a financial success, spawning two sequels; The Return of a Man Called Horse (1976) and Triumphs of a Man Called Horse (1983).

== Plot ==
English aristocrat John Morgan is captured, enslaved, and treated like an animal by a Native American tribe. He comes to respect his captors' culture and gain their respect. He is aided in understanding the Sioux by another captive, Batise, the tribe's half-breed fool, who had tried to escape and was hamstrung behind both knees.

Determining that his only chance of freedom is to gain the respect of the tribe, he overcomes his repugnance and kills two warriors from the neighboring enemy Shoshone tribe, which allows him to claim warrior status. After his victory, he proposes marriage to one of the women with the horses taken in battle as bride-price and undergoes painful initiation rites, taking the native name "Shunkawakan" (or "Horse") as his Sioux name.

When the chieftain of the Sioux takes a vow never to retreat in battle, in order to regain his own honor, Morgan's changing perspective is shown, as he turns angrily on the uncomprehending Batise, telling him, "Five years you've lived here, and you've learned nothing about these people – all his death is to you is a means of escape". After successfully helping to fend off an attack by the enemy tribe, he becomes a respected member of the tribe and ultimately their leader.

== Cast ==
- Richard Harris as John Morgan / Shunkawakan
- Dame Judith Anderson as Buffalo Cow Head
- Jean Gascon as Batise
- Manu Tupou as Yellow Hand
- Corinna Tsopei as Running Deer
- Dub Taylor as Joe
- James Gammon as Ed
- William Jordan as Bent
- Eddie Little Sky as Black Eagle
- Lina Marín as Thorn Rose
- Tamara Garina as Elk Woman
- Manuel Padilla Jr. as Leaping Buck
- Iron Eyes Cody as Medicine Man
- Sonny Skyhawk (Sonny Roubideaux) as Yellow Hand

== Production ==
Sandy Howard read the story in Japan while recovering from an illness. He bought the rights for $250 and tried to set it up as a movie. Howard claims Richard Harris was the fifth actor he offered the lead role to - Robert Redford being the first.

Filming took place in Mexico. For the crucial Native American initiation ceremony (Vow to the Sun), wherein actor Richard Harris is hung on pins in his chest, make-up artist John Chambers created a prosthetic chest.

Harris and Silverstein reportedly clashed during filming. Howard claimed Silverstein was "a disastrous choice" as director. "He was a rat and a bad director," said the producer. "He turned in a movie that had such great potential but it was a dud." According to Howard, he and Jerry Henshaw of Cinema Center Films had to recut the movie. Howard claims Silverstein added $2 million and one year of delay to the film.

== Release ==
The film was initially released in Italy where it played to large audiences in Rome and Naples. It opened in the United States on April 24, 1970 in 150 theaters in 40 cities in North and South Dakota and Minnesota. It expanded on April 29 to other states, including New York, California, Missouri, Michigan, Washington and North and South Carolina and grossed $297,842 in its first 11 days from 25 of the theaters.

== Reception ==
The film has received generally positive critical reviews. On the review aggregator website Rotten Tomatoes, 87% of 15 critics' reviews are positive, with an average rating of 6.9/10.

== Sequels ==
Two sequels to the original film were made, both with Harris reprising his role:

- The Return of a Man Called Horse (1976)
- Triumphs of a Man Called Horse (1983)

== Representation of cultures ==
The film purportedly shared the perspectives of white settlers and Native Americans. It was the first American Western to attempt to portray the Sioux as the protagonists and eulogize their culture, but fell short with Native American audiences because it still had leading white actors as the main characters in order for the film to appeal to white audiences.

However, many people criticized the film harshly. Author Vine Deloria, Jr. (Standing Rock Dakota) said: "As we learned from movies like A Man Called Horse, the more 'accurate' and 'authentic' a film is said to be, the more extravagant it is likely to be in at least some aspects of its misrepresentation of Indians." Folksinger and Indigenous rights activist Buffy Sainte-Marie said: "Even the so-called authentic movies like A Man Called Horse—that's the whitest of movies I've ever seen."

== Home media ==
A Man Called Horse was released to DVD by Paramount Home Entertainment on April 29, 2003, as a Region 1 widescreen DVD and on May 31, 2011, as a Blu-ray disc.

== See also ==
- Dances with Wolves
- List of American films of 1970
- Okipa – The Mandan ritual the movie is based on

== Notes ==
- Callan, Michael Feeney (1990). Richard Harris : a sporting life. London: Sidgwick & Jackson.
