= Suhail Rizvi =

Indian-American businessman

Suhail R. Rizvi
- Born: 1965 (age 60–61); India
- Education: Wharton School of the University of Pennsylvania (B.S.)
- Occupation: Venture Capitalist
- Employer: Chief Investment Officer at Rizvi Traverse Management LLC
- Spouse: Patti Blanchard Rizvi

Suhail R. Rizvi (born 1965) is an Indian-American businessman and co-founder and Chief Investment Officer of Rizvi Traverse Management LLC. He has a Bachelor of Science in economics from the Wharton School of the University of Pennsylvania, and sits on the Wharton Undergraduate Executive Board. A venture capitalist, his investments include Twitter, Facebook, Flipboard and Square. Due to his large stake in Twitter, both personally and for other investors, he was the subject of media scrutiny at the time of Twitter's IPO; he is notoriously private.

Along with social media, Rizvi has invested in telecommunications and entertainment. In April 2007, Rizvi Traverse acquired an equity ownership stake in Summit Entertainment, the studio behind the successful “Twilight” series. In January 2012, Lions Gate announced that it had acquired Summit Entertainment for $412.5 million. In 2005, his firm acquired controlling interest in International Creative Management, but sold its stake. After management problems with the Hollywood talent agency, Rizvi Traverse Management exchanged its equity, "for a combination of cash, preferred non-voting shares and an ongoing interest in certain assets of the company." The firm also helped Hugh Hefner buy back Playboy Enterprises in 2011. In November 2015, the company announced the acquisition of 3D cinema technology firm RealD for $551 million. His father Syied Humayoun Raza Rizvi, who died in July 2016, was a professor of psychology at Ellsworth Community College in Iowa Falls, Iowa.

His brother, Ashraf, is a hedge fund manager.
