= Ashley-Famous =

Talent agency

- Company type: Private
- Industry: Talent agency
- Predecessor: Ted Ashley and Associates; Ashley-Steiner Agency; Ashley-Steiner-Famous Artists
- Founded: 1945; 81 years ago in New York City, U.S.
- Founder: Ted Ashley
- Defunct: 1975; 51 years ago
- Fate: Merged with Creative Management Associates in 1975 to form International Creative Management
- Successor: International Famous Agency
- Key people: Ira L. Steiner (1950–1964)
- Owner: Ted Ashley (1945–1967); Steve Ross (1967–1969); Marvin Josephson (1969–1975)

Ashley-Famous was a talent agency started in 1945 by talent agent Ted Ashley. The agency was responsible for many hit television shows and had several famous clients. It changed names and ownership a few times, eventually becoming one of the agencies that in 1975 formed International Creative Management.

== Overview ==
Ted Ashley was known to be a skilled talent agent who would lead top clients away from other agencies and bring them to his establishment.

One of Ashley-Famous's claims to fame was its ability to market and sell hit television series, many of which ended up being staples of popular culture and/or cult classics. It is said that Ashley was responsible for putting over 100 television shows on the air during his time at this agency. These shows were of all different genres, including science fiction, spy fiction and parodies, and game shows. Examples include Candid Camera, Juvenile Jury, The Danny Kaye Show, Mission: Impossible, Get Smart, The Carol Burnett Show, Medic, Star Trek, Dr. Kildare, The Defenders, Tarzan, Name That Tune, The Twilight Zone and The Doris Day Show.

Under Ashley, the agency represented clients from the entire spectrum of the entertainment industry, including musicians, playwrights, and actors and actresses from both the big and small screens. Some of its more famous musical clients included Perry Como, Trini Lopez, Janis Joplin, The Doors, and Iron Butterfly. In the film industry, it represented Burt Lancaster, Rex Harrison, Yul Brynner, and Ingrid Bergman. Arthur Miller was one of the playwrights the agency represented, as well as Yukio Mishima.

As owner of the agency, Ashley would have made circa 10% on each production.

== History ==
=== Ted Ashley era ===
Ted Ashley had been working at the William Morris Agency (where he started off as a talent agent at the age of 20) when in 1945 he decided to break off and start his own talent agency at the age of 23. It started out in New York City as Ted Ashley and Associates.

In 1950, Ashley was joined by William Morris agent Ira L. Steiner and the agency was renamed the Ashley-Steiner Agency.

In 1962, Ashley-Steiner purchased the Famous Artists Agency from Charles K. Feldman and renamed the merged entity Ashley-Steiner-Famous Artists.

In 1964, Ira Steiner resigned to form his own film production company; Ashley's agency was renamed Ashley-Famous.

In 1966, Ashley-Famous signed a deal with Artie Ripp and his two co-principals to act as the exclusive booker for the majority of Kama Sutra Records' artists and all its writers and producers.

In November 1967, Ted Ashley sold Ashley-Famous to Steve Ross, an entrepreneur in charge of Kinney National Company, in exchange for $12,750,000 in Kinney stock because of personal reasons that involved not wanting to be an agent anymore. In an interview, Ashley said, "There’s something undermining to one’s sense of one’s self about that whole relationship" (referencing the agent and client partnership).

Ashley suggested to Ross that he buy out the cash-strapped film company Warner Bros.-Seven Arts; the sale was completed in 1969. As a result of the sale, Warner Bros.-Seven Arts Inc. was rebranded as Warner Bros. Inc., and Ashley was named CEO.

=== Marvin Josephson era ===
The agency was sold again, to Marvin Josephson, in 1969, because of conflicts of interest that violated anti-trust laws (which prohibited a company from owning both a production studio and a talent agency); it separated from Warner Bros. and became known as International Famous Agency (IFA). Under Josephson, IFA became the first publicly traded talent agency.

In 1971, IFA acquired Jerry Perenchio's Chartwell Artists agency, which represented such stars as Richard Burton, Elizabeth Taylor, Jane Fonda, Marlon Brando, Henry Mancini, Elton John, Glen Campbell, Johnny Mathis, Donovan, José Feliciano, Sérgio Mendes, Rod Taylor, and Michael Landon.

IFA also acquired the British talent agency Robin Dalton Associates in 1971.

In 1975, Josephson merged IFA with Creative Management Associates to form International Creative Management.

== Notable agents ==
Agents who worked for the firm over the years included Kay B. Barrett, David Geffen, Frank Konigsberg, Mike Medavoy, Marvin Minoff, David De Silva, and Martin Baum.
