= David Begelman =

American film producer

- Born: August 26, 1921; New York City, U.S.
- Died: August 7, 1995 (aged 73); Los Angeles, California, U.S.
- Body discovered: August 7, 1995
- Education: New York University
- Occupations: producer, film executive
- Spouses: Ester Begelman (died) Lee Reynolds (div. 1975) Gladyce Largever (m. 1975; died 1986) Annabelle Weston (m. 1990)
- Children: 1

David Begelman (August 26, 1921 – August 7, 1995) was an American film producer, film executive and talent agent who was involved in a studio embezzlement scandal in the 1970s.

== Life and career ==
Begelman was born to a Jewish family in New York City. His father was a Manhattan tailor.

Begelman was in the United States Army Air Forces during World War II. He then became a student at New York University. Following college, he worked in the insurance business.

He worked at the Music Corporation of America (MCA Inc.) for more than 11 years, starting in the mid-1950s, eventually becoming vice president. He left in 1960 to co-found the talent agency Creative Management Associates (CMA) with fellow MCA agent Freddie Fields. Their clients included Judy Garland, Barbra Streisand, Liza Minnelli, Woody Allen, Gregory Peck, Paul Newman, Steve McQueen, Jackie Gleason and Fred Astaire. At CMA, Fields and Begelman pioneered the movie "package", where the talent agency put their stars, directors and writers together on a single project.

Begelman left CMA in 1973 to take over the floundering Columbia Pictures. Begelman used his package method at Columbia, dramatically changing the company's image by producing such hits as Shampoo (1975), Funny Lady (1975) and Close Encounters of the Third Kind (1977).

== Columbia Pictures embezzlement scandal ==
In February 1977, actor Cliff Robertson received a 1099 form from the IRS indicating he had received $10,000 from Columbia Pictures during 1976. He had never received the money, and discovered that his signature on the cashed check had been forged. Robertson's report started a criminal investigation. The Los Angeles Police Department (LAPD) and the Federal Bureau of Investigation (FBI) verified that the $10,000 check was a forgery, and it was tracked to Begelman. He was ultimately fined and sentenced to community service and a public service, anti-drug documentary for the forgeries.

Columbia Pictures suspended Begelman on a paid vacation and announced its own investigation. The studio discovered that Begelman had embezzled an additional $65,000 through other forged checks. However, the studio board of directors wanted to keep the matter out of the press. The Begelman scandal led to a rift between Columbia executives. Columbia Pictures CEO Alan Hirschfield was ousted from the studio in 1978 following his refusal to reinstate Begelman on moral grounds. Following a brief reinstatement, Begelman was quietly fired. The studio released a statement saying he had suffered emotional problems.

Despite the pressure to remain quiet, Robertson and his wife Dina Merrill spoke to the press. David McClintick broke the story in The Wall Street Journal in 1978, later turning it into a best-selling book, Indecent Exposure (1982). Robertson later claimed he had been blacklisted during the 1980s for coming forward about the Begelman affair, and had few roles during this period.

Kirk Douglas, in his autobiography The Ragman's Son (1988), wrote of the scandal:

This is the town where Cliff Robertson exposed David Begelman as a forger and a thief, with the net result that Begelman got a standing ovation at a Hollywood restaurant, while Robertson was blacklisted for four years. On the bad days, you think of what Tallulah Bankhead said: "Who do I have to fuck to get out of this business?"

A writer for New West magazine, working on this story, queried Begelman's claimed alma mater, Yale University, listed in his Who's Who entry. Yale responded that Begelman had never attended that university. The New West article said that "although Begelman was indicted for forgery and grand theft, the Hollywood types were more outraged that he had listed Yale in Who's Who. Apparently they figured that everybody steals money. It was the fact that he lied about Yale that drove them crazy."

== Judy Garland management ==
In the wake of the allegations about embezzling from Columbia Pictures, Jeanie Kasindorf, writing for New York Magazine and New West magazine in January 1978, reported that Begelman had also stolen money from Judy Garland when he was her agent in the early 1960s. Her reporting was based on files and canceled checks supplied by Garland's estranged husband Sid Luft, alleging that Begelman and a partner, agent Freddie Fields, had embezzled many thousands of dollars from the singer.

Building on and substantially expanding that reporting, a 1993 book by Coyne Steven Sanders, Rainbow's End: The Judy Garland Show (Morrow 1990), about the history of Judy Garland's CBS Television series The Judy Garland Show (1963–1964), devoted a chapter to possible embezzlement of Garland's funds by Begelman. Garland's estranged husband at the time, Sid Luft, hired an attorney to audit her income from the time Begelman began representing her with fellow agent Freddie Fields. It was discovered that several hundred thousand dollars were missing, much of it written in checks to "Cash" and endorsed by Begelman at various casinos in Las Vegas. Other entries in her accounts showed large sums paid for "protection" with no authorization, all approved by Begelman, though Garland had no personal security. In addition, a 1963 Cadillac convertible, given to Garland as partial payment for appearances on Jack Paar's television program, was titled to Begelman. Garland never knew the car was part of her compensation for her appearance.

In addition, Begelman told Garland a photo existed of her, partially nude, having her stomach pumped in a hospital emergency room after a drug overdose in London, and that blackmailers were demanding $50,000 to turn over the picture and all negatives. As she was in negotiations with CBS at the time for her new television series, Garland paid rather than face the adverse publicity and potentially damaging the deal's prospects. Luft's attorney eventually determined that the check went to a holding company with a business address in New York City owned by Begelman, and was further traced to a personal account of Begelman.

Rather than confront Begelman at a time when he was playing such a pivotal role in her show business re-emergence, Garland decided to eat the financial losses based upon the promise of millions coming from the deal with CBS. However, once her show was cancelled, she and Luft sued Begelman for the hundreds of thousands he had allegedly stolen as well as $1 million in punitive damages. Due to her dire financial situation at the time, Garland was forced to settle the suit for royalties owed her by Capitol Records that Begelman and Fields, as her agents, had collected but were holding because of the lawsuit.

== Sherwood Productions / Gladden Entertainment ==
In January 1980, Begelman returned to the production world and became COO and president of Metro-Goldwyn-Mayer signing a four-year contract worth $1.9 million. In 1981, MGM acquired United Artists and in October, Begelman was appointed as chairman and CEO of UA but with the exception of Fame, Clash of the Titans, and Poltergeist, he was unable to repeat his success at Columbia and was dismissed in 1982. After leaving MGM/UA, Begelman was offered a position to run a production company, Sherwood Productions, by backer Bruce McNall. Under Sherwood, Begelman backed WarGames (which was released by MGM), Mr. Mom, The Adventures of Buckaroo Banzai Across the 8th Dimension, and Blame It on Rio. According to the makers of Buckaroo Banzai, Begelman continued to engage in fraud: he reportedly inflated the budget figures to investors, but produced the films for much less and pocketed the difference.

When investor Nelson Bunker Hunt pulled out of Sherwood in 1984, Begelman took the slack and founded Gladden Entertainment (named after Gladyce, his wife) with the remaining assets and repartnering with McNall. There, he greenlit Mannequin, Weekend at Bernie's, The Fabulous Baker Boys, Short Time and Mannequin Two: On the Move. Short Time and Mannequin Two did poorly. In 1986, the company revealed that they filed a lawsuit against The Cannon Group, Inc. and Cannon Screen Entertainment, stemming from a decision for the previous agreement with Thorn EMI Screen Entertainment for removing two films from the slate, but the suit was settled on August 12, 1986. In 1988, McNall sold 40% of his ownership to foreign investors. At the 1993 Cannes Film Festival, Begelman revealed that the company had a distribution deal with MGM, Live Entertainment and Rank Film Distributors for 10-film and $150-million. However, Credit Lyonnais had placed a lien on Gladden's assets as the bank was owed $90 million. A petition was filed by Hollywood's three major talent guilds in U.S. Bankruptcy Court in Los Angeles to liquidate the company for failure to pay actors, directors and writers residuals in the amount of $4.1 million. Begelman left Gladden Entertainment to form Gladden Productions. However, he was unable to secure financing for the new production company (Ironically, MGM now owns the rights to the Sherwood/Gladden films as a result of their purchase of the Epic library from PolyGram in 1998; PolyGram had acquired the library from Credit Lyonnais two years prior).

== Personal life and death ==
Begelman was married four times. His first wife was Ester Begelman, a sister of a friend; she died of breast cancer after seven years of marriage. His second wife was Lee Reynolds; they had one daughter, Leslie Begelman Belskie, before divorcing. In 1975, he married Gladyce Largever, former wife of New York real estate developer Lewis Rudin; she died in 1986 of cancer. After his wife's death, he lived with actress Sandra Grant Bennett until 1990 when he married Annabelle Weston.

Begelman became depressed over his Gladden Entertainment bankruptcy and failure to find funding for Gladden Productions. Begelman was found shot dead in a room at the Century Plaza Hotel in Los Angeles on August 7, 1995, at the age of 73. His death was ruled a suicide; he was interred at Hillside Memorial Park Cemetery in Culver City. At his death he was married to his fourth wife and was survived by his daughter, a sister and a brother.

== Bibliography ==
- David McClintick, Indecent Exposure: A True Story of Hollywood and Wall Street (New York: William Morrow and Company, 1982)
- Coyne Steven Sanders, Rainbow's End: The Judy Garland Show (1993)
- McNall, Bruce; D'Antonio, Michael (July 9, 2003). Fun While It Lasted: My Rise and Fall In the Land of Fame and Fortune (1st ed.). New York City: Hyperion. ISBN 978-0-7868-6864-3.
