= Talent agent =

Person representing entertainment and sports professionals

A talent agent, or booking agent, is a person who finds work for actors, authors, broadcast journalists, film directors, musicians, models, professional athletes, screenwriters, writers, dancers, and other professionals in various entertainment or sports businesses. In addition, an agent defends, supports and promotes the interest of their clients.

Having an agent is not required, but does help the artist get jobs (concerts, tours, movie scripts, appearances, signings, sport teams, etc.). In many cases, casting directors or other businesses go to talent agencies to find the artists for whom they are looking. The agent is paid a percentage of the star's earnings. Various regulations govern different types of agents. The legal jurisdiction in which the agent conducts business and artist's unions set the rules. There are also professional associations of talent agencies.

Talent agents (artist managers) are considered gatekeepers to their client's careers. They have the ability to reshape and reconstruct their client's image. They are dealmakers and assist their clients by orchestrating deals within the entertainment and event industries, more specifically the Hollywood entertainment industry.

In California, because talent agencies are working with lucrative contracts, the agencies must be licensed under special sections of the California Labor Code, which defines an agent as a "person or corporation who engages in the occupation of procuring, offering, promising, or attempting to procure employment for an artist or artists."

== History ==
Since the decline in viewership in theaters from the 1950s to 1960s, a monumental shift occurred in how studios produced films and reduced the cost of exclusive and expensive actors. After the shift, actors and actresses were working for the studios but were not owned by one major studio entity, so they were able to work with other studios. This shift has meant that agents were now seen as a necessity instead of an option. Agents became third parties who negotiated between studios and clients, making the need for the agents' services an imperative for each party.

In the 1980s, new agencies were established to compete with the "Big five." In 1991, Bauer-Benedek merged with Leading Artists Agency to form what became United Talent Agency. These agencies were Traid Artists and InterTalent. Traid Artist would eventually be sold to William Morris Agency in 1992, and InterTalent would diminish when its partners dispersed between UTA and ICM in the same year.

As of 2022, the top three Hollywood talent agencies are William Morris Endeavor (WME), Creative Artists Agency (CAA), and United Talent Agency (UTA). Except for ICM Partners, each agency has its own affiliated production company, which may hire the agency's clients. In 1989, the three major agencies were William Morris, ICM, and CAA. During the 2000s, the majors were known as the "big five." or "top five". In 2009, Endeavor Talent Agency and William Morris merged. Later, CAA and ICM merged in 2022.

== Job description ==
An agent has two sets of clients: the "talent" (actors, models, voice-over artists, bands, musicians, stand-up comedians, dancers etc.) and the "buyer". The buyer can be a casting director, advertising agency, production company, photographer, or direct client if the client has an "in-house" production staff. Agents promote talent to the buyers, submitting talent who have the appropriate age, race, sex, look, talent, etc. that the buyer is seeking for his/her project. Usually, an agent submits the actor's head shot or the model's composite card or portfolio to the buyer. After the buyer has made choices, the agent then arranges an audition (or, for models, a "go-see" or open call). After the buyer has met the talent, the buyer will contact the agent to see if any of the talent will be hired. The agent will coordinate the details of wardrobe, directions, etc., as well as negotiate the contract or pay.

The agent's job is to get the talent to audition; the talent is the only person who can get the job. For their work, agents take a 10 to 20% commission of the gross, depending on whether the job is union (such as SAG-AFTRA) or not. Union jobs are paid per negotiated guidelines, but in non-union jobs, the pay is sometimes delayed.

A well-established agent will have networks upon networks of contacts. Also, agents have access to professional casting services. Many of these casting resources are not available to the general public.

Although most of the successful agents are private individuals unknown to the public, some are celebrities in their own right. Notable current and former talent agents include Michael Ovitz, Ronald Meyer, David Begelman, Ari Emanuel, Freddie Fields, Johnny Hyde, Irving Paul Lazar, Sue Mengers and Lew Wasserman.

== Differences between agents and managers ==
The difference between the roles of agents and managers has become smaller and more blurred. A frequent definition of the role of a talent manager is to "oversee the day-to-day business affairs of an artist; advise and counsel talent concerning professional matters, long-term plans and personal decisions which may affect their career." Considerable overlap exists as talent agents may opt to fill exactly the same roles for their clients out of a financial interest in developing the careers of their talent and currying their favor.

Various state laws and labor guild rules govern the roles reserved to agents, as well as specifying certain special rights, privileges, and prohibitions. In the state of California, the labor code requires licensing of talent agencies and includes regulations such as criminal background checks, maintaining separate operating accounts and client trust accounts, and limiting total commissions to 25 percent, among other regulations. In contrast, management companies are described as "often unregulated." Agents also have certain privileged powers in situations of verbal agreement and can legally agree to a binding employment offer on behalf of their client.

A prominent difference between agents and managers under California state law is that licensed talent agents and employment agents are the only entities legally allowed to seek work on behalf of their clients. This legal distinction has enabled artists such as the Deftones, Pamela Anderson, Nia Vardalos, Freddie Prinze Jr., and others to break contracts with their managers and avoid commissions owed according to those contracts by proving "unlicensed procurement" in court. Because enforcement against talent managers procuring work is largely carried out through civil litigation and not criminal penalties, managers directly seek out work in defiance of state laws, as clients out of self-interest will seldom object to them doing so, and cases alleging illegal procurement are infrequent.

The Writer's Guild, Screen Actor's Guild, and Director's Guild, among labor guilds, strike agency franchise agreements that specify certain regulations and privileges reserved solely for agents, including setting maximum commissions at ten percent of a talent's gross earnings. Managers do not face the same restrictions.

== Types of talent agents ==
=== Music agent ===
In the music world, booking agents are different from talent managers. Booking agents are the people who actually book concerts for the artists they represent. These agents make all of the arrangements with the promoters of the shows. The booking agent presents the promoter or producer of the concert with a performance agreement, which stipulates the artist's requirements. Items may include lighting, sound, meals, hotel accommodations, and transportation. For concert buyers, they work to find the artist who will fit their needs and available budget.

Many of the major booking agencies refuse to represent clients who are not already signed to a major record label and have national distribution of their music. Because of this, artists on independent record labels often seek representation with an independent booking agency.

Bars and nightclubs that specialize in presenting live music on a regular basis often employ an individual to assemble the schedule of events. This individual is the venue's buyer and should not be confused with the booking agent, who presents a roster of available acts to the buyer. Booking agents may also have contacts known as promoters. These are individuals who agree to produce an event (concert, show, etc.) by providing a location, sound system, and assembling a staff and other necessities. Producing a show in this manner at a location rented out for a single evening is called "four-walling," as the process entails renting a venue and receiving no additional services or technical equipment other than the space itself. This has often been the only available option for underground musicians lacking enough popular appeal to gain access to more conventional performance venues (see: Punk rock, but is also used among the genre of raves and various DJ-related events).

The cost factor of having a booking agent must be weighed against what the agent can do for clients and buyers alike. Some agents represent several different types of artists, while others represent artists in one main area/genre.

Some music agencies deal exclusively with cover bands, listing exclusive and non-exclusive artists on their rosters. In addition, some agencies will also work with a third-party company to build specific bands using their own database of vetted musicians, while other cover band agencies work with session musicians that provide a 'flexible' line-up for each act.

Booking agents are also used for the cruise ship industry, where several different categories of entertainers are needed. These can include individual musicians to be part of the ship's orchestra, small bands and ensembles, as well as variety entertainers such as singers, instrumentalists, magicians, comedians and acrobats. Artists looking to work on cruise ships will sign an employment contract with the cruise line and a separate commission contract with the booking agent. The agent will usually be based in the country of origin for the artist.

=== Music manager ===
A music manager (or band manager) handles many career issues for bands, singers, record producers, and DJs. An artist manager is hired by a musician or band to help with determining decisions related to career moves, bookings, promotions, business deals, recording contracts, etc. The role of music managers is extensive and may include similar duties to that of a press agent, promoter, booking agent, business manager (who is sometimes a certified public accountant), tour promoter, tour manager, and sometimes even a personal assistant. responsibilities of a business manager are often divided among many individuals who manage various aspects of a musical career. With an unsigned act, music managers must assume multiple roles: booking agent, graphic designer, publicist, promoter, and accountant. As an artist's career develops, responsibilities grow. A music or artist manager becomes important to managing the many different pieces that make up a career in music. The manager can assist singers, songwriters, and instrumentalists in molding a career, finding music producers, and developing relationships with record companies, publishers, agents, and the music-loving public. The duties of an active music manager will focus on developing a reputation for the musician and building a fan base, which may include mastering and launching a demo CD, developing and releasing press kits, planning promotional activities, and booking shows. A music manager will gain access to a recording studio, photographers, and promotions. They will see that CD labels, posters, and promotional materials appropriately represent the band or artist and that press kits are released in a timely manner to appropriate media. Launching a CD with complementary venues and dates is also a music manager's responsibility.

=== Talent buyer ===
A talent buyer is a person who identifies and books talent for venues and events in addition to managing the budget for an entertainment performance, determining whether or not the list of performers will sell, as well as deciding if more vigorous promotion is necessary to increase attendance. A talent buyer employed or contracted by a venue might focus on finding artists, while talent buyers working for production companies try to find venues as well as artists.

Some will also map scaling for facilities, build compensation offers for artists, ensure that all performances are settled accurately and work to build and identify festivals. Talent buyers are like traffic control at the venue center, working with managers, agents, and/or artists directly in addition to venue staff to bring event from concept in the mind of an artist to in-person reality.

=== Youth & young adult agent ===
Youth agents are a specialization or subset of theatrical and commercial agents that represent children, teenagers, and young adults. In addition to representation, youth agents must navigate the additional requirements surrounding minors, including legal, educational, parental, and family dynamics. In the U.S., all states have child labor laws that apply to the entertainment industry. In California, the center of the entertainment industry, there are specific industry regulations and laws to protect minors working in entertainment that include: limited working hours and a requirement to set aside a portion of earnings into a trust.

== See also ==
- Entertainment law
- Music law
- Sports law
- Talent buyer
