= Dorothy M. Johnson =

American novelist

- Born: December 19, 1905; McGregor, Iowa, United States
- Died: November 11, 1984 (aged 78); Missoula, Montana, United States
- Occupation: Writer
- Writing career
- Language: English
- Subject: Western fiction
- Notable works: The Hanging Tree; The Man Who Shot Liberty Valance; A Man Called Horse

Dorothy Marie Johnson (December 19, 1905 – November 11, 1984) was an American writer best known for her Western fiction.

== Biography ==
=== Early life ===
Dorothy Marie Johnson was born in McGregor, Iowa, the only daughter of Lester Eugene Johnson and Mary Louisa Barlow. Soon after her birth, the family moved to Montana.

While she was a student at Whitefish High School, she began to write professionally, working as a newspaper stringer for The Daily Inter Lake in Kalispell, Montana. She studied English in college before a brief marriage that ended in divorce.

=== Professional life ===
Her writing career seemed to take off in 1930, when she sold her first short story to The Saturday Evening Post for $400. Johnson did not sell another story, though, for 11 years, until in 1941, four stories narrated by a recurring character, "Beulah Bunny", sold to The Saturday Evening Post for $2,100. Her writing was temporarily sidetracked by World War II, when she went to work for the Air Warden Service. After the war, she produced some of her better-known Western stories. Three of these were made into notable films, namely A Man Called Horse (1970) starring Richard Harris, The Man Who Shot Liberty Valance (1962) starring John Wayne and James Stewart, and The Hanging Tree (1959) starring Gary Cooper.

From 1956 to 1960, Johnson taught creative writing at the University of Montana, from which she had graduated in 1928. Before and during her tenure, she wrote numerous articles and fictional stories for many different magazines. These were often based on interviews with Western old-timers, Native Americans, and characters she met during her tenure as secretary and researcher for the Montana Historical Society. She was also secretary/manager of the Montana Press Association in the 1950s.

== Honors ==
In 1957, the Western Writers of America gave her its highest award, the Spur Award, for "Lost Sister", a short story in The Hanging Tree collection, that deals with the reintegration into white settler society of Cynthia Ann Parker, who had been kidnapped by Comanche as a child. In 1959, she was made an honorary member of the Blackfoot Tribe. In 1976, she was awarded the Levi Strauss Golden Saddleman Award for bringing dignity and honor to the history and legends of the West. In 2005, a 30-minute documentary film was made of her life by Sue Hart of Montana State University in Billings. The four-year effort was written and co-produced by Hart, along with producer Gene Bodeur, director Bill Bilverstone and film director Lansing Dreamer. Margot Kidder lent her voice to the effort. It was titled Gravel in her Gut and Spit in her Eye, and shown on PBS in November 2005.

Johnson was inducted in 2013 to the Montana Cowboy Hall Of Fame and Western Heritage Center for the "Legacy Award" for her "notable contributions to the history and culture of Montana".

== Death ==
Johnson always prided herself on her self-sufficiency after a failed marriage early in life. She stated that her epitaph should read "Paid in Full." Her grave in the cemetery in Whitefish, Montana, reads simply "PAID". She died on November 11, 1984, aged 78.

== Bibliography ==
=== Novels ===
- Buffalo Woman (1977)
- All the Buffalo Returning (1979)

=== Juvenile novels ===
- Farewell to Troy (1964)
- Witch Princess (1967)

=== Short stories ===
- "A Man Called Horse" (1950)
- "The Man Who Shot Liberty Valance" (1953)
- "The Day the Sun Came Out" (1955)
- "The Elk Tooth Dress" (1958)

=== Short-story collections ===
- Beulah Bunny Tells All (U.S. edition, 1942); Miss Bunny Intervenes (UK edition, 1948)
- Indian Country (later published as A Man Called Horse) (1953)
- The Hanging Tree (1957)
- Flame on the Frontier: Short Stories of Pioneer Woman (1967)
- The Man Who Knew the Buckskin Kid (1976)

=== Nonfiction ===
- The Private Secretary by John Robert Gregg (1943); ghost written by Johnson
- Famous Lawmen of the Old West (1963)
- Ancient Greek Dress (1964)
- Greece: Wonderland of the Past and Present (1964)
- Some Went West (1965)
- Artists of Carmel: 15 Profiles (1968)
- Warrior for a Lost Nation (1969)
- All About Riding: Learn to Ride—and Ride Well (1969)
- Western Badmen (1970)
- The Bloody Bozeman: The Perilous Trail to Montana's Gold (1971)
- Montana (States of the Nation series) (1971)
- The Bedside Book of Bastards (1973); with R. T. Turner
- When You and I Were Young, Whitefish (1982)

== Print references ==
- Alter, Judy. Dorothy Johnson. BSU Western Writers Series, #44. Boise State University, 1980.
- Kich, Martin. Western American Novelists. Volume 1: Walter Van Tilburg Clark, Dan Cushman, H.L. Davis, Vardis Fisher, A.B. Guthrie, Jr., William Humphrey and Dorothy M. Johnson. New York; London: Garland, 1995.
- Smith, Steve. The Years and the Wind and the Rain: A Biography of Dorothy M. Johnson. Steve Smith. Missoula, Montana: Pictorial Histories Publishing Company, 1984.
