= Talent agency =

Company that represents professionals in various industries

A talent agency is a company that represents actors, authors, musicians, models, athletes, writers, dancers, and other professionals in various industries. Talent agencies specialize, either by creating departments within the agency or developing entire agencies that primarily or wholly represent one specialty. For example, there are modeling agencies, commercial talent agencies, literary agencies, voice-over agencies, broadcast journalist agencies, sports agencies, music agencies and many more.

== History ==
Since the decline in viewership in theaters from the 1950s to 1960s, a monumental shift occurred in how studios produced films and reduced the cost of exclusive and expensive actors. After the shift, actors and actresses were working for the studios but were not owned by one major studio entity, so they were able to work with other studios. This shift has meant that agents were now seen as a necessity instead of an option. Agents became third parties who negotiated between studios and clients, making the need for the agents' services an imperative for each party.

In the 1980s, new agencies were established to compete with the "Big five". In 1991, Bauer-Benedek merged with Leading Artists Agency to form what became United Talent Agency. These agencies were Traid Artists and InterTalent. Traid Artist would eventually be sold to William Morris Agency in 1992, and InterTalent would diminish when its partners dispersed between UTA and ICM in the same year.

As of 2022, the top three Hollywood talent agencies are William Morris Endeavor (WME), Creative Artists Agency (CAA), and United Talent Agency (UTA). Except for ICM Partners, each agency has its own affiliated production company, which may hire the agency's clients. In 1989, the three major agencies were William Morris, ICM, and CAA. During the 2000s, the majors were known as the "big five." or "top five". In 2009, Endeavor Talent Agency and William Morris merged. Later, CAA and ICM merged in 2022.

== Types of talent agencies ==
=== Broadcast journalistic agencies ===
Some talent agencies specialize in the representation of television news broadcast journalists and television news magazine hosts. The journalists and hosts represented by these agents primarily work at television stations in local markets or at networks. There are many job titles for broadcast news journalists, such as anchors, reporters, weathercasters, sportscasters, correspondents and hosts.

=== Music agencies ===
In the music world, booking agents are different from talent managers. Booking agents are the people who actually book concerts for the artists they represent. These agents make all of the arrangements with the promoters of the shows. The booking agent presents the promoter or producer of the concert with a performance agreement, which stipulates the artist's requirements. Items may include lighting, sound, meals, hotel accommodations, and transportation. For concert buyers, they work to find the artist who will fit their needs and available budget.

Many of the major booking agencies refuse to represent clients who are not already signed to a major record label and have national distribution of their music. Because of this, artists on independent record labels often seek representation with an independent booking agency.
