= ICM Partners =

Talent and literacy agency

International Creative Management Partners
- Company type: Private
- Industry: Talent and literary agency
- Founded: 1975; 51 years ago in Century City, Los Angeles, California, US
- Founder: Marvin Josephson
- Defunct: 2022
- Fate: Acquired by Creative Artists Agency
- Headquarters: Constellation Place; Century City, Los Angeles, California, US
- Area served: Represented clients in the fields of film, television, music, publishing, live performance, branded content, and new media
- Website: www.icmpartners.com

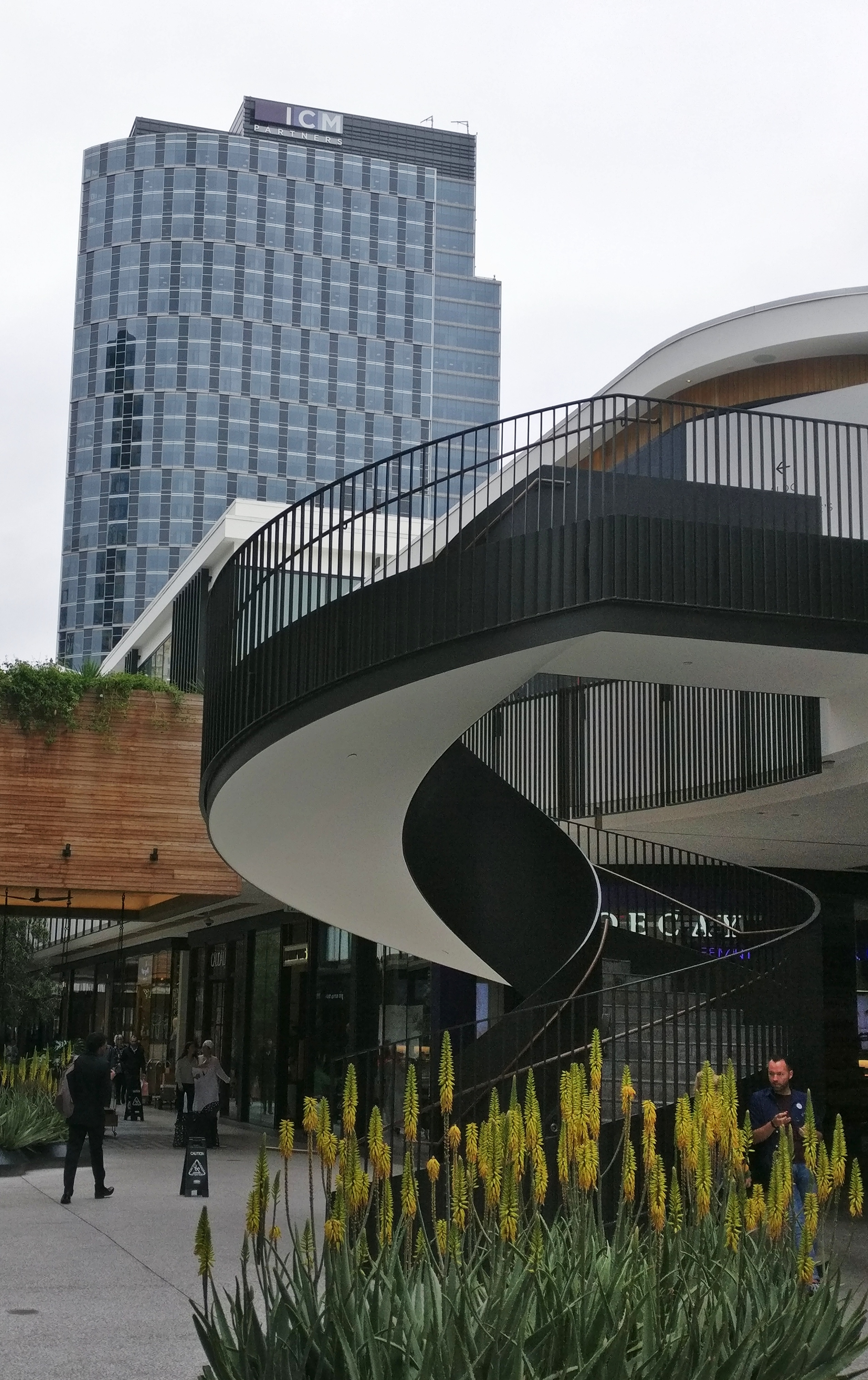
Constellation Place, the headquarters of the agency, overlooking Westfield Century City.

ICM Partners was a talent and literary agency with offices in Los Angeles, New York City, Washington, D.C., and London. The company represented clients in the fields of motion pictures, television, music, publishing, live performance, branded entertainment and new media. Its corporate headquarters were in Constellation Place in Century City, Los Angeles. In 2022, ICM became part of Creative Artists Agency.

== History ==
=== Formation and growth ===
International Creative Management was formed in 1975 through the merger of Marvin Josephson's International Famous Agency and Freddie Fields' Creative Management Associates (CMA). ICM's first president was Freddie Fields, although he did not last long in the role. Other important figures in the merger were Sam Cohn and Guy McElwaine of CMA.

In 1985, ICM acquired London-based talent agency Duncan Heath Associates, which in 1991 merged with ICM London, with Heath became chairman of the merged company.

In 1992, Josephson relinquished direct control of ICM to a triumvirate composed of Jeff Berg, Sam Cohn, and Jim Wiatt. Despite this transfer of leadership, Josephson retained a significant role within the agency, maintaining an active leadership position and continuing to manage his personal client roster.

In 2005, the company raised a financing round of $75 million from Rizvi Traverse.

In 2006, ICM acquired the literary agency Broder Webb Chervin Silbermann.

=== ICM Partners ===
In 2012, the agency completed a management buyout and formed a partnership with the new name, ICM Partners.

In March 2018, ICM acquired the Just For Laughs comedy festival, as part of a partnership with the Canadian entertainer Howie Mandel. A 51% majority was later sold to Bell Media and Groupe CH to maintain a primarily-Canadian ownership. In June that year, ICM formed a partnership with esports-focused talent agency Evolved.

In December 2019, ICM Partners sold a one-third equity stake in the company to Crestview Partners, with the expressed goal to grow the company within the representation business with an emphasis on International growth.

In March 2020, ICM partnered with Primary Talent International, a London-based music touring agency with over 700 touring clients. In August, they bought a significant minority interest in Albatros, a literary agency based in Stockholm and moved partner Pete Stone to Sweden to run ICM Europe. In October, the agency purchased Stellar Group, the largest football/soccer agency in the world and rebranded it ICM Stellar Sports. (Stellar Group CEO Jonathan Barnett was listed as the No. 1 sports agent in the world by Forbes magazine in 2019.)

In July 2021, ICM Partners and ICM Stellar Sports purchased one of the leading NFL representation agencies, Select Sports Group, a Texas based company headed by Jeff Nalley and Erik Burkhardt.

=== Acquisition by Creative Artists Agency ===
In September 2021, it was announced that ICM would be acquired by Creative Artists Agency (CAA). The deal closed in June 2022 at a value of $750 million. Following the acquisition, 105 positions from ICM were set to be eliminated, with about 425 staffers and agents joining CAA.

== Departments ==
=== Television and movies ===
ICM Partners' television and motion picture departments represented film actors, actresses, directors and writers. The departments also featured a division dedicated to production professionals such as cinematographers, editors, second unit directors, composers, production designers, costume designers and visual effects supervisors. The television department also represented on-air and creative talent.

=== Publishing ===
ICM Partners represented writers and editors including Patricia Cornwell, Thomas Friedman, Anna Quindlen, E.L. Doctorow, Walter Isaacson, Carl Hiaasen, Tom Bissell, Anthony Swofford, Chris Cleave, Candace Bushnell, John Feinstein, Ann Patchett, Carol Higgins Clark, and Steve Martin. In addition, the agency represents the estates of Theodor Geisel (Dr. Seuss), Arthur Miller, E.B. White, and Tennessee Williams, among others.

=== Music, comedy, and lectures ===
ICM Partners' concert and live appearances department represented artists in music and comedy as well as lecturers. ICM Partners acquired New York City speakers agency Royce Carlton, Inc. in 2017. From the acquisition until late 2019, the lecture division still went by the Royce Carlton name. On October 16, 2019, the division rebranded to ICM Speakers and relocated to the Washington, D.C., office. ICM Speakers' division services included the management and representation of professional public speakers. A few notable clients included author Mitch Albom, author Jon Meacham, TV host Karamo Brown, and activist Nadia Murad.

=== Branded entertainment ===
ICM Partners' global branded entertainment division's services ranged from celebrity endorsements, product placement, and music tour sponsorship to brand integration, such as the creation and packaging of original branded films and television shows. The agency's celebrity endorsements department serviced all ICM Partners' film and television talent for on-camera, print and voiceover commercial work as well as for paid media campaigns.
