= Kinney National Company =

Former American media conglomerate

Kinney Services Inc.
- Formerly: Kinney Service Corporation (1961–1966); Kinney National Service Inc. (1966–1971); Kinney Services Inc. (1971–1972)
- Type: Public
- Traded as: NYSE: KSR (1962–1966) NYSE: KNS (1966–1972)
- Industry: Mass media; Service industries (parking services, cleaning services)
- Predecessor: Kinney Parking System (1945–1961); National Cleaning Contractors Inc. (1886–1966)
- Founded: December 26, 1961; 64 years ago (as Kinney Service Co.); August 12, 1966 (as Kinney National Service)
- Founder: Steve Ross; William V. Frankel
- Defunct: August 12, 1966; 60 years ago (merger with National Cleaning); February 10, 1972; 54 years ago (renamed to Warner Communications)
- Fate: Merger and incorporation as Kinney National Service Inc.; reincorporation as Warner Communications Inc. in 1972
- Successor: Warner Communications
- Headquarters: 10 Rockefeller Plaza, New York City, New York, United States
- Key people: Steve Ross (CEO and President); William V. Frankel (Chairman); Edward Rosenthal (Vice Chairman); Caesar Kimmel (Vice-President)
- Divisions: Warner Bros. Inc.; National Periodical Publications; Panavision Inc.; Kinney Record Group International; Television Communications Corporation
- Subsidiaries: National Kinney Corporation (50% ownership); Hackensack Trust Company (99% ownership)

Kinney Services Inc. (originally Kinney National Service, Inc.) was an American media conglomerate and holding company located in New York City. It was formed through the merger of Kinney Parking Company (founded December 1961) and National Cleaning Contractors, Inc (established 1886). Kinney Services oversaw numerous service companies including funeral homes, parking facilities, and maintenance firms. By the late 1960s, Kinney National pivoted to entertainment after several media acquisitions, most notably Warner Bros.–Seven Arts. In 1971, Kinney National separated its non-media divisions to National Kinney Corporation (a separate company) and reincorporated as Warner Communications.

== Background and development ==
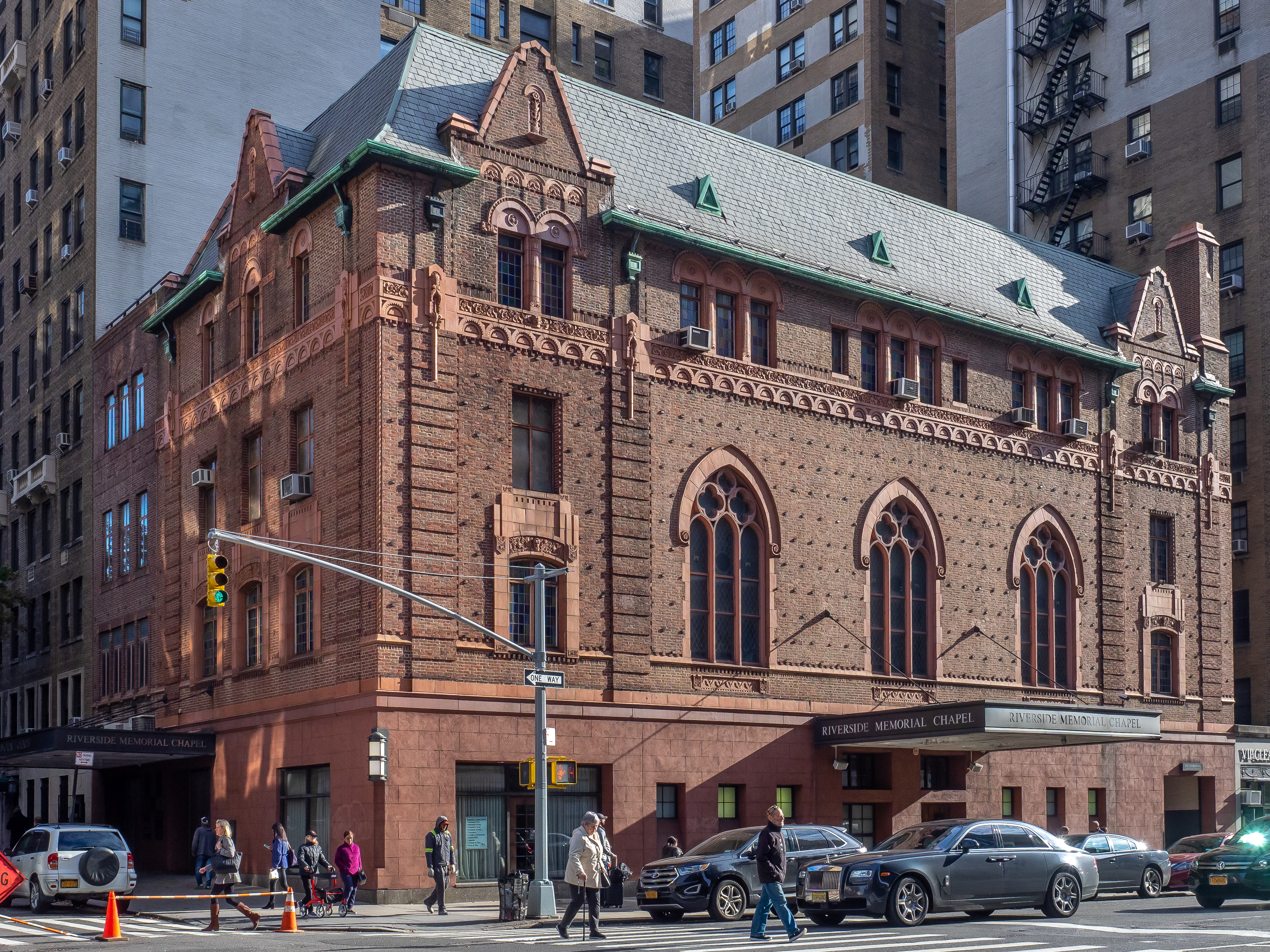
The main Riverside Chapel (pictured in 2019)

=== Riverside Memorial Chapels ===
The Riverside Memorial Chapels are an American-Jewish funeral chain with eight locations in New York and Florida. The company was founded in 1897 as Meyer's Livery Stable by Louis Meyer and his son-in-law, Charles Rosenthal. The company moved around Manhattan, starting in the Lower East Side, then in East Harlem, and the Upper West Side in 1926, where its three-story Neo-French-Renaissance style facility was constructed. By 1933, Meyer's & Company separated into Riverside Memorial Chapel, Inc and Park West Memorial Chapel. Charles Rosenthal passed management of his company to his sons, Edward and Morton Rosenthal. The brothers oversaw the expansion of Riverside through acquiring the Frank E Campbell funeral home, Universal Funeral Chapel, Inc., and Echevarria Sons Corporation. Sister Riverside Chapel locations were opened in South Florida and Upstate New York leading Riverside Memorial to become the then-largest funeral service group in the United States.

=== Kinney Parking Systems ===
Kinney Parking System (renamed Kinney System Inc.) was one of the largest parking operators in the Northeastern United States While little information surrounds the company's origins, Connie Bruck's 1995 Biography, Steve Ross and the Creation of Time Warner provides details about its early history along with its founder, Manny Kimmel. Kinney Parking was incorporated in 1945 and was granted leases to two of Newark's biggest parking lots in 1948. Sigmund Dornbusch was its president until his death in 1956. The company was majority owned by Manny and his son, Caesar Kimmel, who served as President of Kinney Parking from 1956 to 1961. Manny Kimmel engaged in racketeering during the Prohibition Era and was rumored to have worked with criminals like Abner Zwillman. The FBI kept information on Manny until the 1960s and documents described him as having engaged in gambling and horse-racing.

=== Steve Ross and Abbey Rent-A-Car ===
Steve Ross was born and raised in Brooklyn and worked as a clothing salesman until the mid-1960s. He met and married Carol Rosenthal (daughter of Edward Rosenthal) in 1954 and joined the main Riverside Chapel as a funeral director by 1956 following growing resentment towards his job. In 1958, Edward and Steve were approached by Abe Silverstein (not to be confused with Abe Silverstein) about starting a rental car company. Steve previously suggesting renting out Riverside's limousines at nighttime for extra income. The car rental, Abbey Rent-A-Car, enjoyed unsuccessful operations and by 1959, Edward suggested closing the company. Abe and Steve contacted Caesar Kimmel, President of Kinney Parking, and the three decided to rebrand Abbey as Kinney Rent-A-Car in June 1960.

It was co-owned by Riverside Memorial and Kinney Parking. Abe Silverstein was its president and CEO. Abe and Steve convinced Caesar to allow those renting from Kinney Renting to get free parking at Kinney Parking locations. Steven Ross was believed to have been the sole founder of Kinney Rent-A-Car until 2013, when Abe Silverstein's biography, When Two Cents was Money, revealed that while Steve was heavily involved with the company, he never had a formal role in it and was not responsible for its successes. In 1961, Edward, Steve, Caesar, and Abe concluded that Kinney Parking and Kinney Renting would better perform as one company, leading to a merger.

== Kinney Services' merger with National Cleaning ==
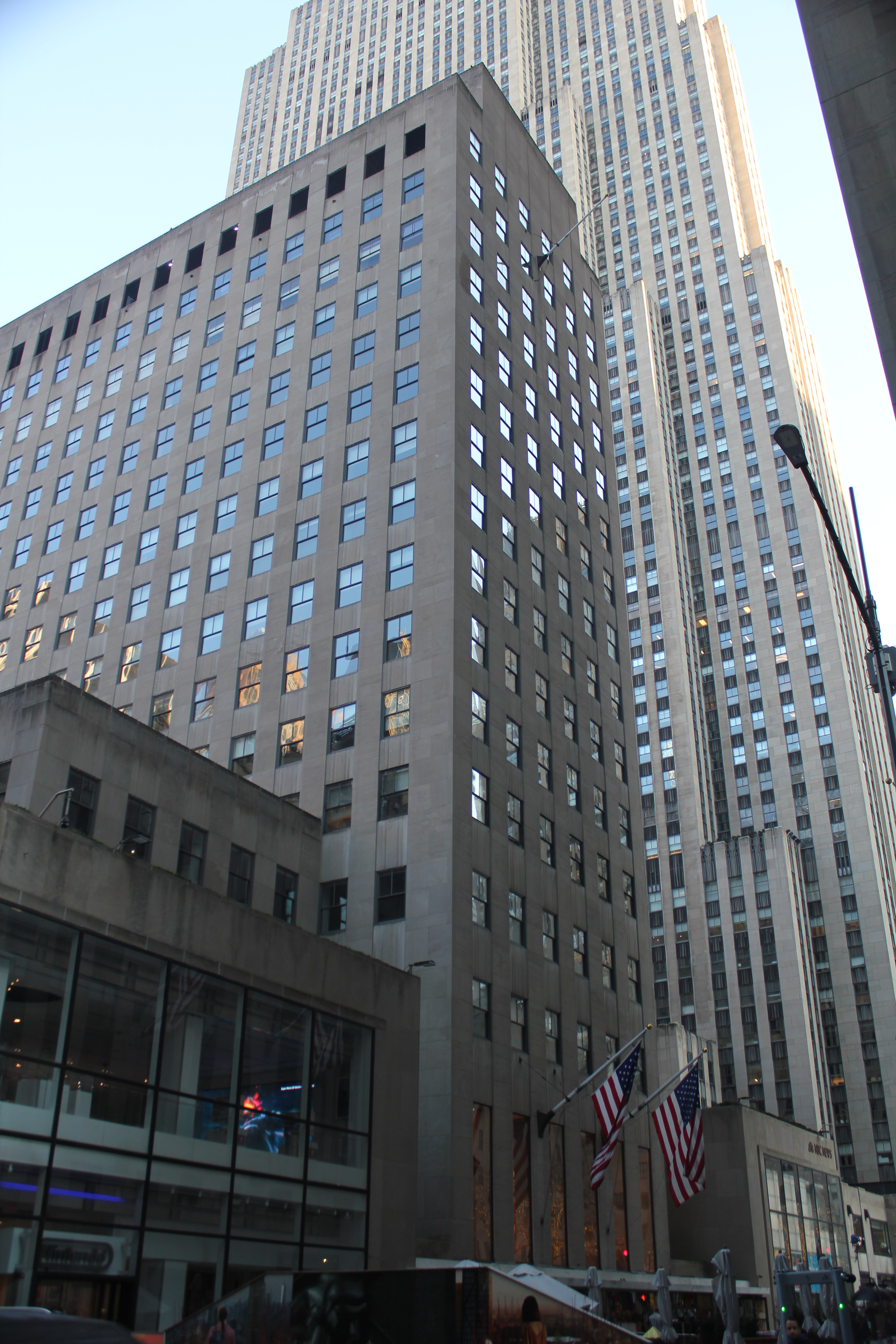
10 Rockefeller Plaza (pictured in March 2022), which served as the headquarters of Kinney National Service

=== Kinney Service Corporation ===
The merger between Kinney Parking and Kinney Renting was changed to a four-way merger after Edward Rosenthal brought in his family businesses, Riverside Memorial Chapel and City Service Cleaning Contractors. The merger lasted several months and was completed on December 26, 1961. The resulting company, Kinney Service Corporation, was founded as a private company and its executives included Steven Ross (President and CEO), Edward Rosenthal (Chairman), and Caesar Kimmel & Morton Rosenthal (Vice-presidents). Majority of the company's executive management came from Riverside. In April 1962, Kinney Services was planning the first public offering of its shares. It later went public on the American Stock Exchange under the ticker symbol of (KSR). Kinney Services reported revenues exceeding $17 million and was valued at $12.5 Million.

In November 1962, Kinney Services chose 10 Rockefeller Plaza as its corporate headquarters. Kinney Services purchased two car rental companies in Long Island. Kinney Services bought two printing companies and expanded its holdings in the cleaning industry in 1963 by acquiring Terminal Cleaning Contractors, Inc. In 1964, Kinney Services acquired Walter B Cook, Inc (A funeral chain with eight locations in New York) for $70 Million. Kinney Services merged with National Cleaning Contractors, Inc in 1966 for a $25 million deal. Following the merger, executives from National Cleaning joined Kinney Services and the combined company, Kinney National Service Inc., began trading under (KNS) on the New York Stock Exchange.

=== National Cleaning Contractors ===
National Cleaning Contractors was established in New York City during 1886 as National Window Cleaning & House Renovating Co. Its founders were Max Sweig and Louis Frankel. Louis' father, Aaron Frankel, was an immigrant from the Russian Empire. Max Sweig immigrated to America from Austria-Hungary (now Austria) and was the company's vice-president and one of its directors. The company started out a window shop and was renamed to National Window Cleaning & House Co. By 1926, Louis Frankel's son, William V. Frankel joined the company and during the 1930s, it was renamed to National House Cleaning Contractors. Max Sweig died in 1937 and his son, Morton Sweig, joined the company. William V. Frankel was President of National Cleaning until 1966.

== Pivot to entertainment ==
=== Service industry and media acquisitions ===
Kinney Service Corporation took its new name on August 12, 1966, as Kinney National Service, Inc., after completing its merger with National Cleaning Contractors Inc. William V. Frankel joined Kinney as its Chairman, while Edward stepped down to become Vice-Chairman.

Kinney National Service (National was removed from the company name in February 1971) engaged in a string of high-profile media acquisitions along with a multitude of service-related acquisitions:

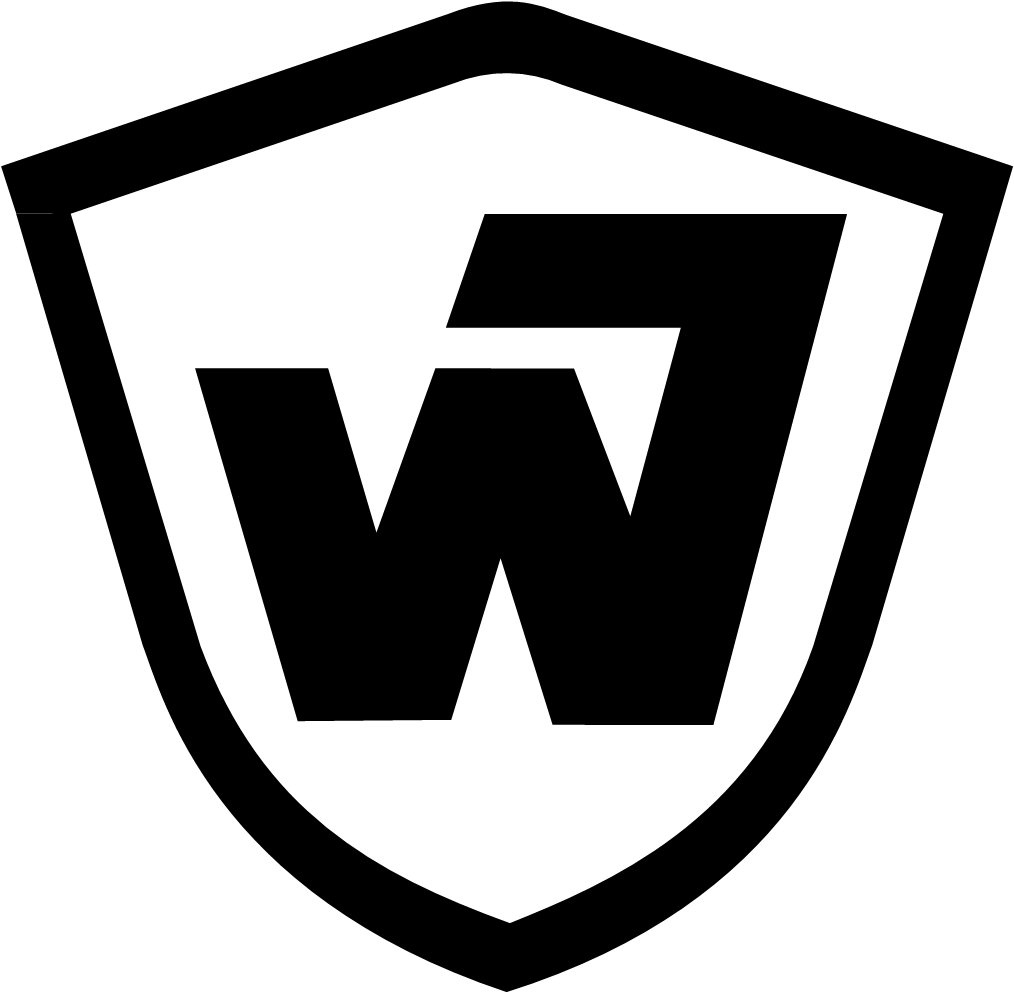
Warner Bros.–Seven Arts, the biggest acquisition done by Kinney National

- In 1967, Kinney National acquired Star Circle Wall Systems, Inc., and Hudson Painting and Decorating.
- In the same year, Kinney also acquired Circle Floor Co., Inc. (managed by Paul Milstein and Seymour Milstein). The Milsteins would join Kinney as executives. Kinney acquired multiple service companies in 1967. These included Schatz Painting Company, Circle Acoustics Corporation, the Star Carpentry Companies, and Wachtel Plumbing Company.
- On July 21, 1967, Kinney National expanded by acquiring National Periodical Publications (predecessor to DC Comics) which owned the Mad magazine of E. C. Publications, Inc. The acquisition was completed on August 25 of the same year for $30 Million.
- On November 13, 1967, Kinney National bought Hollywood talent agency Ashley-Famous for $12 Million. Ted Ashley (the founder of Ashley-Famous) suggested to Ross that he buy out the cash-strapped film company Warner Bros.–Seven Arts, which had purchased Atlantic Records that same month.
- In February 1968, Kinney acquired Panavision, Inc.
- In late 1968, Kinney National announced its interest in acquiring the Hackensack Trust Company for $23 million.
- On January 28, 1969, it was announced that Kinney National would acquire Warner Bros.–Seven Arts, Ltd. The acquisition was completed on July 4, 1969, for a $400 million deal. On April 20, Ashley-Famous was sold because of existing antitrust laws prohibiting a company from owning both a production studio and a talent agency. After bidding war with the Commonwealth United Entertainment in late spring of 1969, Kinney National acquired Warner Bros.–Seven Arts, Ltd. In August, Ted Ashley became chief of the film company. On December 16, Warner Bros.–Seven Arts Inc. was rebranded as Warner Bros. Inc. Beginning with the unexpected success of the concert documentary Woodstock (1970), Warner Bros. started scoring box office hits again and became a major studio.
- Kinney National acquired 99% of Hackensack Trust Bank between January and February 1969. Following this acquisition, Charles A. Agemian was elected a Director of Kinney National (a position he retained with Warner Communications).
- In May 1970, Kinney National acquired Coronet Communications Inc., publisher of Coronet and the Paperback Library.
- In 1970, Kinney National bought Jac Holzman's Elektra Records and Nonesuch Records. In the same year, Kinney National signed a lease to the 75 Rockefeller Plaza (known as the Esso Building during development). Kinney moved to the building in 1973 after it became Warner Communications.
- Kinney System Inc. acquired Katz Parking in 1970 and its president, Daniel Katz, became CEO of Kinney System. Caesar Kimmel transferred complete control of Kinney System to Daniel by 1972. Daniel would oversee Kinney System until committing suicide in 1987. Lewis Katz succeeded Daniel as president and would continue overseeing it until the 1990s.
- In February 1971, Kinney National changed its name to Kinney Services Inc.
- In June 1971, Kinney Services sold all its funeral businesses to Service Corporation International for $30 million.
- On November 22, 1971, Kinney Services also bought Television Communications Corporation (which was renamed as Warner Cable in 1973), including its recording studio operations of 1,210,500 common shares. Warner Cable would go on to become Time Warner Cable and was later acquired by Charter Communications and rebranded as Spectrum.

== Spinoff and reorganization ==
Logo of Warner Communications

Kinney Services announced plans in June 1971 to separate into two distinct companies: one focused on media and entertainment, and the other towards the service industry. On August 7, 1971, Kinney Services' non-entertainment assets (with exception to Hackensack Bank) were spun off as a separate company named National Kinney Corporation. On December 13, 1971, Kinney Services' directors suggested renaming the company after Warner Bros. and it would reincorporate as Warner Communications Inc. on February 10, 1972, and traded on the New York Stock Exchange as WCI. Steve Ross was WCI's sole CEO, President, and Chairman. William V. Frankel previously held the position of chairman until his death on July 1, 1972.

Morton Rosenthal, Caesar Kimmel, Edward Rosenthal, and Charles A. Agemian each retired from Warner Communications between 1976 and 1984. Warner Communications enjoyed stability until its decline with Atari and fended off a merger attempt by News Corporation in 1984.

In 1990, Warner and Time Inc. merged to form Time Warner (now Skydance). Steve Ross died of prostate cancer on December 21, 1992, and his positions as CEO and chairman were passed to Gerald Levin, his chosen successor.

== Former assets ==
=== Sold to Sandgate Corporation ===
In its early years of business, Kinney Services treated Kinney Rent-A-Car as its flagship division or "crown jewel", but the rental division began to lag behind its sister divisions and was eventually sold to Sandgate Corporation for $11 Million on October 1, 1968. It's likely Kinney also sold its two Long Island car leasing firms, to Sandgate as well.

- Kinney Rent-A-Car

=== Sold to Service Corporation International ===
Kinney Services sold its funeral companies to SCI for $30 million in June 1971, officially ending its involvement in the deathcare industry. Edward and Morton Rosenthal remained as executives at Kinney (renamed Warner Communications), marking the end of the Riverside being a family business. The funeral homes sold included:

- Riverside Memorial Chapel, Inc (Currently operates 8 Riverside Chapels in New York and Florida, down from a peak of 10 in 1962)
- Frank E Campbell (Acquired by Riverside in 1948)
- Universal Funeral Chapel, Inc. (Acquired by Riverside in 1955)
- Walter B Cook Inc
- Echearria Sons Corporation

=== Divested for anti-trust ===
After the acquisition of Warner Bros.-Seven Arts, Kinney National divested Ashley-Famous as anti-trust laws at the time prohibited a company from owning both a film studio and a talent agency.

- Ashley-Famous was sold on April 20, 1969, to Marvin Josephson. Its founder, Ted Ashley, stayed with Kinney National and served as the chairman of Warner Bros. from 1969 to 1980. It was Ashley who personally suggested to Steve Ross that Kinney acquire Warner Bros. Ashley-Famous was renamed International Famous Agency (IFA) and became the first publicly traded talent agency.

=== Spun off to National Kinney Corporation ===
In September 1971, Kinney Services, which had already begun offloading its non-media divisions, separated all its service businesses to National Kinney Corporation (with exception to Hackensack Trust Company). Only Caesar Kimmel, Edward Rosenthal, Morton Rosenthal, and William V. Frankel remained with Kinney Services while every other executive stemming from Kinney's service sector joined National Kinney. The businesses spun off included:

- Kinney System Inc
- Cleaning Companies
  - National Cleaning Contractors, Inc.
  - Terminal Cleaning Contractors, Inc.
  - City Service Cleaning Contractors
- Circle Floor Co., Inc.
- Star Centry Corporation
- Star Circle Wall Systems, Inc

== Works cited ==
- Bruck, Connie (April 1, 1995). Master of the Game: Steve Ross and the Creation of Time Warner (1st ed.). PENGUIN PUTNAM. ISBN 9780140244540.
- Silverstein, Abe (December 3, 2013). When Two Cents was Money. iUniverse. ISBN 9781491716076.
