= Philip L. Milstein =

American real estate developer (born 1949)

- Born: August 5, 1949 (age 76)
- Education: Columbia College (BA); New York University Stern School of Business (MBA)
- Occupations: Real estate developer, banker
- Known for: Former chairman of Emigrant Savings Bank
- Spouse: Cheryl S. Glicker
- Children: Meredith Milstein; Joshua Milstein; Toby Milstein; Larry Milstein
- Parent(s): Seymour Milstein; Vivian Leiner
- Family: Constance Milstein (sister); Paul Milstein (uncle); Howard Milstein (cousin)

Philip L. Milstein (born August 5, 1949) is an American real estate developer, banker, and philanthropist.

== Early life and education ==
Milstein is the eldest son of billionaire real estate developer Seymour Milstein and Vivian Leiner. He graduated with a B.A. from Columbia College in 1971 and received his MBA from New York University in 1974.

== Career ==
From 1987 to 2003, Milstein served in various capacities as the vice chairman, president and CEO, and co-chairman of Emigrant Savings Bank, owned by his family. The extended Milstein family, however, was involved in a series of high-profile lawsuits over the division of their $5 billion fortune as well as succession issues that eventually tore the family apart. In 2003, his family sold its stake of the bank to his uncle, Paul Milstein, and cousin, Howard Milstein.

Joined by his sister, Connie Milstein, and his niece, Abigail Elbaum, he founded Ogden Cap Properties to manage their share of the family holdings that include several luxury apartment buildings in New York City, notably 1 Lincoln Plaza, as well as The Jefferson, a historic luxury hotel in Washington, D.C. Milstein currently serves as a principal in the company.

== Philanthropy ==
Milstein is known for his philanthropic activities. He donated $20 million to fund the construction of the new Medical and Graduate Education Building at the Columbia University Vagelos College of Physicians and Surgeons, designed by Diller Scofidio + Renfro. He and his wife also donated $25 million to Barnard College to fund The Cheryl and Philip Milstein Center for Teaching and Learning.

He donated to help with the renovation of the Butler Library of Columbia University, which named the undergraduate library in his honor. He served as a trustee of Columbia University as well as the chairman and president of 92nd Street Y.

He currently serves as a vice chairman of the Lincoln Center and on the board of NewYork–Presbyterian Hospital.

== Personal life ==
He is married to Cheryl Sue Glicker, a graduate of Barnard College and Benjamin N. Cardozo School of Law, who currently serves as the chairwoman of the board of trustees of Barnard College. The couple has four children, two of whom are described as activist philanthropists by The New York Times.

The Milstein family's net worth is estimated at $3.1 billion by Forbes magazine in 2015, listing them as the 90th richest family in the United States.
