= Edward Rosenthal =

American businessman (1903–1991)

- Born: Edward Rosenthal; July 7, 1903
- Died: May 23, 1991 (aged 87); White Plains, New York, US
- Education: B.A. University of Pennsylvania
- Children: 4
- Family: Steve Ross (son-in-law)

Edward Rosenthal (July 7, 1903 – May 23, 1991) was an American businessman who served as the former vice chairman of Warner Communications, and president/owner of the Jewish funeral home chain Riverside Memorial Chapel.

== Biography ==
Rosenthal was born on July 7, 1903, to a Jewish family. He had two siblings: Miriam Rosenthal Passerman and Morton Rosenthal. In 1924, he graduated with a B.A. from the Wharton School at the University of Pennsylvania. After school he took over his family's funeral home business founded by his grandfather, Louis Meyers, in 1897. In 1933, he divided the company into two brands, the Riverside Memorial Chapel and Parkwest Chapels and expanded to Miami, Florida (1935); Brooklyn (1938); the Bronx (1940); and Westchester County, New York (1950). He expanded further via acquisitions acquiring the Frank E. Campbell Funeral Chapel (1948), the Universal Funeral Chapel (1955); and the Walter B. Cooke Chapel (1957) to become the largest funeral company in the United States.

The company diversified after he brought his son-in-law Steve Ross (who married his daughter Carol in 1953) into the business. They established a separate company that would lease out their vehicles in the evenings when they were not needed for funerals and then opened a rental company, Abbey Rent a Car. They later merged the funeral home and Abbey with a parking lot operator, the Kinney Parking Company, which was then owned by underworld crime figures Manny Kimmel and Abner Zwillman; and added City Service Cleaning Contractors, Inc,, an office cleaning business jointly owned by Rosenthal and a cousin. In 1958, Rosenthal ceded control to his son-in-law. The resulting holding company, Kinney Service Corporation, was taken public in 1962 with a market valuation of $12.5 million. Rosenthal served as vice chairman of Kinney National from 1962 until 1966. In 1964, Kinney National purchased wood flooring manufacturer Circle Floor from Seymour and Paul Milstein for $15 million. In 1966, Kinney expanded into the entertainment business by purchasing the Ashley-Famous talent agency and then in 1969, Kinney paid $400 million for the ailing Warner Bros.-Seven Arts film studio and record business. In 1971, the funeral business was purchased by Service Corporation International. A year later, after spinning off its remaining non-entertainment assets, Kinney National Services renamed itself Warner Communications with Rosenthal serving as vice chairman of Warner Communications from 1972 until 1983.

During World War II, he served with the Seabees in Okinawa. Rosenthal was a founder of the Fairview-Greenburgh Day Care and Community Center.

== Personal life and death ==
Rosenthal was married to Bea "Doris" Rosenthal; they had four children: Peter, Ellen, Patricia and Carol. His first wife Beatrice Malawista Rosenthal died in childbirth with their child Carol in 1935. He died on May 23, 1991, aged 87, of leukemia, at his home in White Plains, New York. His son-in-law Steve went on to become a businessman.
