= National Kinney Corporation =

Real estate development company

Andal Corporation
- Formerly: National Kinney Corporation
- Industry: Real estate
- Predecessor: Kinney Services
- Founded: August 7, 1971; 55 years ago
- Founder: Kinney Services, Inc.
- Defunct: 1999; 27 years ago
- Fate: Dissolution
- Headquarters: New York City, United States
- Parent: Warner Communications (1972–1978)

National Kinney Corporation was a parking, property management services, and real estate development company based in New York City. It was established on August 7, 1971 after Kinney Services separated its service holdings from its entertainment holdings.

== History ==
National Kinney expanded from parking and building services into real estate development by purchasing the Uris Buildings Corporation, but the timing was bad as the NY real estate market collapsed in the 1973–75 recession and the main Uris Building asset was soon lost to foreclosure.

In March 1974, Societe de Gestion Immobiliere et Mobiliere S.A., a French holding company, announced that they were interested to buy National Kinney Corporation from Warner Communications for $8 million in cash. However, the deal between two companies was terminated on June 22 of that same year. Four years later, on December 28, National Kinney was spun out from Warner Communications as an independent company. The corporation was acquired by Morton Sweig and Paul Milstein, a former president of National Kinney.

In 1979, after some protracted negotiations, National Kinney attempted to purchase The Aladdin hotel and casino in Las Vegas in a joint venture with Johnny Carson, planning to rename it after the star. However, Carson's wife Joanna gossiped about the deal, and subsequent trading in National Kinney stock led to insider trading charges against third parties by the SEC and the disgorgement of profits.

In 1982, National Kinney sold its National States Electric division to an undisclosed buyer, and then agreed to sell its parking subsidiary, Kinney System Inc., to that division's chairman Daniel Katz and a group of investors. In 1983, National Kinney subsequently renamed itself to Andal Corporation and sold its remaining majority interest in Kinney System parking. In 1997, Kinney System was acquired by Central Parking Corporation. Andal invested in the declining Steve's Ice Cream and merged in Swensen's before selling them off. The company went private in 1998 and was delisted from the New York Stock Exchange. Its history since 1999 is not widely known, but it's likely been reduced to a shell corporation.

== See also ==
- Kinney National Company
- Kinney Parking Company
- Warner Bros.-Seven Arts
- Warner Communications
