= Morton Sweig =

American businessman (1915–2011)

Morton Arthur Sweig (February 13, 1915 – January 8, 2011) was an American businessman and industry leader in janitorial and maintenance services.

His father, Max Sweig, was vice president of National House Cleaning Contractors, Inc. (founded as National Window Cleaning and House Renovating Co. in 1886 by Max Sweig, Aaron Frankel and Louis Frankel) until his death on December 1, 1937. He headed National Cleaning Contractors, which later merged with Kinney Services Corporation to form Kinney National Services, Inc.

After Kinney/National merged, Kinney founded its subsidiary, National Kinney Corporation, in September 1971 and was incorporated as Warner Communications Inc. on February 10, 1972.

Sweig's political activism landed him on the master list of Nixon political opponents.

Sweig later headed National Kinney Corporation for three years.

== Personal life ==
Sweig died on January 8, 2011; services were held at Riverside Memorial Chapel.
