= Charles A. Agemian =

Armenian-American banker (1909–1996)

- Born: July 22, 1909; Aleppo, Ottoman Syria
- Died: March 30, 1996 (aged 86); Neptune City, New Jersey, United States
- Education: University of Pennsylvania; Columbia Business School
- Occupation: Banker
- Known for: CEO of Garden State National Bank
- Spouse: Mary Agemian
- Children: Sandra Borg; Mary Louise Heath

Charles A. Agemian (July 22, 1909 – March 30, 1996) was an Armenian-American banker who took early retirement from Chase Manhattan Bank, where he was executive vice president of operations, to become chairman and chief executive officer of the Hackensack Trust Co., which later was renamed Garden State National Bank.

== Early life and education ==
Agemian was born in Aleppo, Syria and immigrated to the United States at the age of fourteen. After receiving his B.A. from the Wharton School of the University of Pennsylvania, Agemian graduated from Columbia Business School with an MBA.

== Career ==
Agemian began his banking career in 1927 as a messenger for the Bank of Manhattan Co. After rising through the ranks in operations, Agemian was named vice president and deputy controller when the Bank of Manhattan Co. and Chase National Bank merged in 1955 to become Chase Manhattan Bank. A year later, he became vice president and controller, and, in 1959, controller general. Agemian is known to have had a good relationship with John J. McCloy, the Chairman of Chase Manhattan. In July 1963, he was named executive vice president of operations of Chase Manhattan Bank, a position he held until his retirement in December 1969. On Jan. 1, 1970, he became chairman and chief executive officer of Hackensack Trust Co. at the urging of Steve Ross, then chairman of Kinney Services Inc., which was the bank's majority shareholder. Kinney National Company later merged with Warner Bros. to become Warner Communications.

Shortly after taking over, Agemian changed the bank's name to Garden State National Bank, and, a year later, merged it with North Jersey National Bank of Hudson County. Because of the Federal Bank Holding Company Act of 1956, Warner was forced to divest its stake in the Garden State National Bank. After an initial divestiture attempt was derailed by a dissident board member, William A. Conway, who claimed that it allowed Warner Communications to exit at a profit at the expense of certain minority shareholders, Garden State ultimately merged in 1980 with Fidelity Union Bancorporation of Newark (which later became part of Wachovia). This transaction required Agemian's resignation from the Warner Communications board so he could continue as chairman and chief executive officer of Garden State. Agemian retired from Garden State in 1981 but remained active as a faculty member at the Stonier Graduate School of Banking and Pace University.

== Personal life ==
A resident of Spring Lake, New Jersey, Agemian died on March 30, 1996, at the age of 86. He was married to Mary Agemian. They had two children: Sandra Borg and Mary Louise Heath.
