= William A. Conway (banker) =

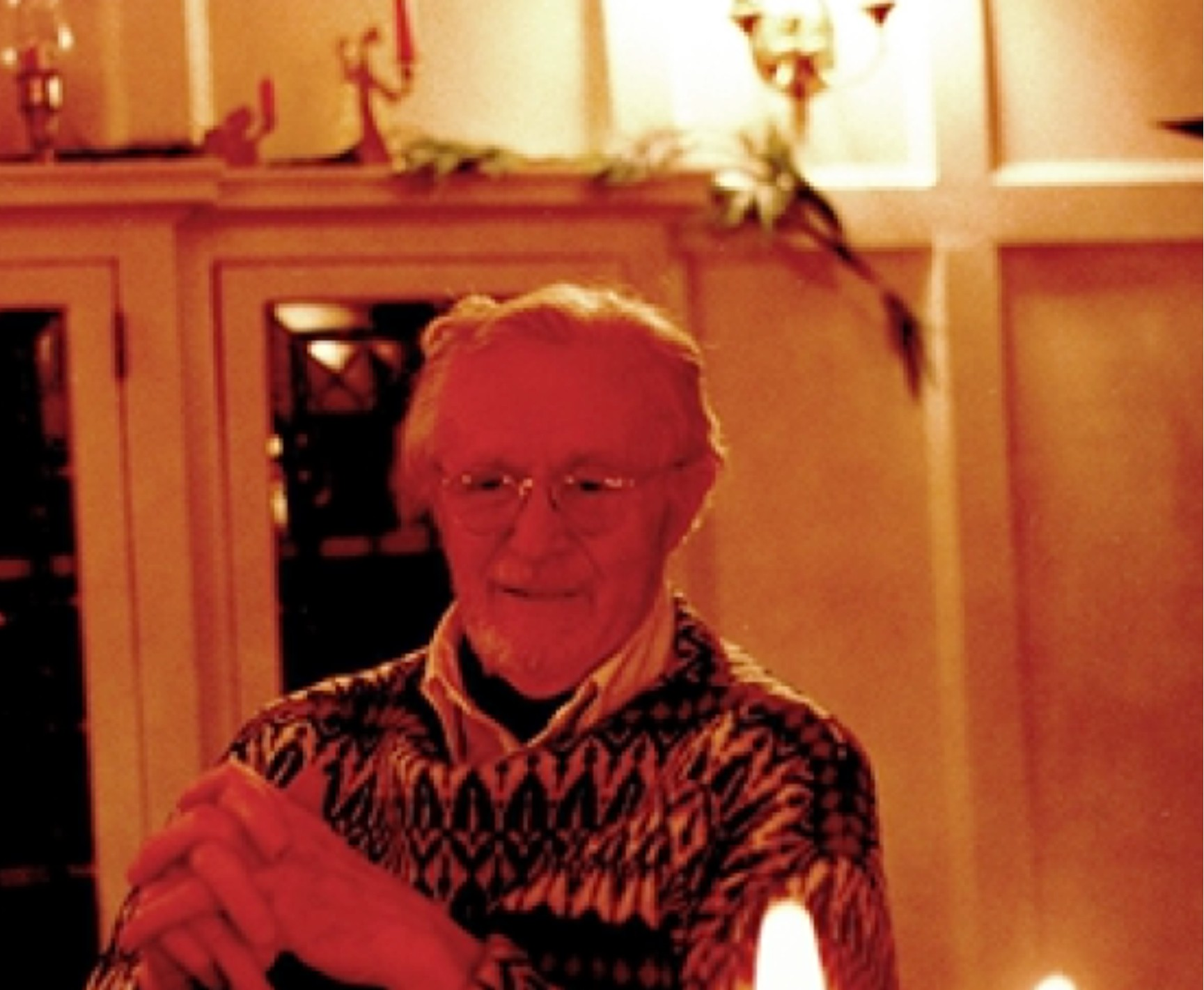
William A. Conway

William A. Conway (April 16, 1910 – March 31, 2006) was a Wall Street messenger boy who rose to CEO of Garden State National Bank ("Garden State"), but he is best remembered for his efforts working as an activist shareholder of behalf of minority stockholders of Garden State during the late 1970s. As a dissident member of the board, his independent efforts to block a merger he viewed as unfair to certain minority shareholders is often compared to the shareholder rights efforts undertaken in recent years by certain hedge funds.

Conway was born in Newark, but resided for much of his life in Chatham, New Jersey and Summit, New Jersey.

Conway attended the Pingry School in Elizabeth, New Jersey but did not graduate due to a bout with rheumatic fever that sidelined him for several months.

Though Conway never finished high school, he started work as an errand boy on Wall Street and later began what turned out to be an illustrious banking career. Moving on to the Hudson County National Bank in Jersey City, New Jersey, Conway rose from an entry-level clerk position, ultimately becoming president of the bank, leading it through a period of technological change and mergers.

In the case of the 1978 proposed merger between Garden State and National State Bank of Elizabeth, Garden State's majority investor, Warner Communications, would have received a larger percentage of cash than the minority shareholders.

Originally supported by Warner Communications CEO Steve Ross (Time Warner CEO) and by Garden State's CEO, Charles A. Agemian, who was also on the board of Warner Communications, the transaction was ultimately defeated after Conway waged an independent effort via the Office of the Comptroller of the Currency which ultimately blocked the merger by placing conditions on the merger application that Agemian viewed as unrealistic.

Following that failed transaction, Conway staged a successful proxy fight for a seat on the board of directors of Garden State. Garden State ultimately merged in 1980 with Fidelity Union Bancorporation of Newark (which later became part of Wachovia).

He died on March 31, 2006, aged 95.
