= Krulewitch =

Krulewitch is a surname. Notable people with the surname include:

- Melvin Krulewitch (1895–1978), American military officer and lawyer
- Samuel Krulewitch (1871–1937), American politician
