= Ted Ashley =

American film studio executive (1922–2002)

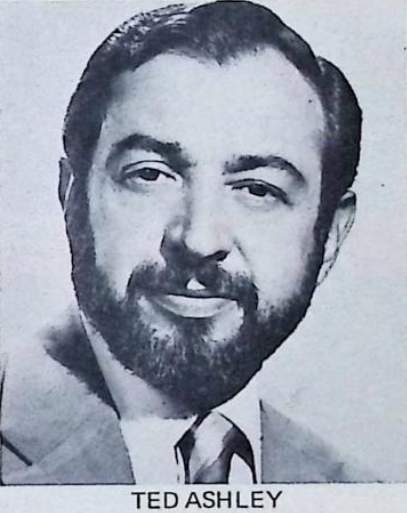
- Publicity photo of Ted Ashley
- Born: Theodore Assofsky; August 3, 1922; Brooklyn, New York City, U.S.
- Died: August 24, 2002 (aged 80); New York City, U.S.
- Occupations: Talent agent, Media executive
- Years active: 1936–1988
- Known for: Founder of Ashley-Famous; Chairman of Warner Bros.
- Spouses: Connie Sitomar (m. 1945, divorced) Joyce Easton (m. 1978, divorced) Page Cuddy (m. 1987; death 2002)
- Children: 4
- Family: Nat Lefkowitz (uncle)

Ted Ashley (August 3, 1922 – August 24, 2002) was a talent agent and media executive. Founder of the Ashley-Famous talent agency, he was later chairman of the Warner Bros. film studio from 1969 to 1980.

== Biography ==
Ashley was born to a poor Jewish family in Brooklyn in 1922 as Theodore Assofsky. He graduated from Franklin K. Lane High School. At the age of 14, he went to work at the William Morris Agency where his uncle, Nat Lefkowitz, worked as a general manager (Lefkowitz would later rise to become president and then co-chairman of the William Morris Agency). At the age of 20, he became an agent for the agency and changed his name to "Ashley" as it sounded dignified and English. In 1945, despite the ire of his uncle, he started his own talent agency, Ted Ashley and Associates.

In 1950, he was joined by William Morris agent Ira L. Steiner and the agency was renamed the Ashley-Steiner Agency. In 1962, he purchased the Famous Artists Agency from Charles K. Feldman and renamed the agency Ashley-Steiner-Famous Artists. In 1964, Steiner resigned to form his own film production company and the agency was renamed Ashley-Famous. In 1967, the agency was sold to Kinney National Company in exchange for $12,750,000 in Kinney stock. Ashley made the sale for personal reasons, indicating that he did not want to be an agent anymore. In an interview, Ashley said, “There's something undermining to one's sense of one's self about that whole relationship” (referencing the agent and client partnership).

In 1969, Kinney head Steve Ross acquired the cash-strapped film company Warner Bros.-Seven Arts at Ashley's suggestion. The purchase was made and Ashley was appointed CEO of the movie studio where he served until 1981. Beginning with the unexpected success of the concert documentary Woodstock (1970), the company started scoring box office hits again, reestablishing Warner Bros. as a major studio. He then became vice chairman of Warner Communications until his retirement in 1988.

== Personal life and death ==
Ashley was married three times. In 1945, he married 18-year-old Constance Sitomar. She later worked at the Metropolitan Museum of Art in New York. His second wife was Joyce Easton (born 1930), a character actress on television shows such as Days of Our Lives; they married in 1978 after a lengthy relationship. She had occasionally represented Ashley when he was absent from Warner Bros board meetings, without herself being employed by Warner. Together, Easton and Ashley participated in Erhard Seminars Training around 1975. He married his third wife, Page Cuddy, in 1987. He had two biological daughters: Fran Curtis Dubin and Diane Ashley; and two adopted daughters, Kim Balin and Banhi Sinclair, whom he and his third wife adopted after the death of actress Ina Balin.

Ashley was good friends with Bruce Lee.

He died aged 80 in New York of leukemia, after a long illness.
