= Garden State National Bank =

Former American commercial bank

- Type: Private company
- Industry: Financial services
- Predecessor: The Hackensack Bank and North Jersey National Bank of Hudson County
- Founded: 1889
- Defunct: 1980
- Fate: Acquired
- Successor: Fidelity Union Bancorporation of Newark which later became Wachovia
- Headquarters: New Jersey, United States
- Area served: New Jersey suburbs of New York City
- Key people: Charles A. Agemian
- Products: Banking services, investment banking
- Owner: Warner Communications

Garden State National Bank ("Garden State") was an American mid-size commercial bank located in northern New Jersey that enjoyed success in the increasingly wealthy New Jersey suburbs of New York City during the 1970s.

The significant media coverage it received during that period was more due to the various M&A transactions considered by its colorful CEO, Charles A. Agemian and by its majority investor, Warner Communications. It was ultimately subsumed into Fidelity Union Bancorporation of Newark (which later became part of Wachovia) in 1980.

== History ==
Garden State began business in 1889 under the name The Hackensack Bank (a state bank) and became a national bank in 1901. It subsequently merged into the Hackensack Trust Company (a state bank) . It was again converted into a national bank in 1966. The name of the bank was changed from the Hackensack Trust Company, N.A. to Garden State National Bank in 1970. Garden State and the North Jersey National Bank were consolidated in 1971. In December 1975, Garden State acquired the four offices of the Hardyston National Bank of Hamburg, in Sussex County, New Jersey, and in August 1977, acquired three offices of Shore National Bank, in Ocean County, New Jersey. At the time of its acquisition by Fidelity Union Bancorporation of Newark, Garden State's offices were located at 10 Forest Avenue in Paramus, New Jersey.

Agemian was named chairman and chief executive officer of Hackensack Trust Corp. on January 1, 1970, at the urging of Steve Ross (Time Warner CEO), then chairman of Kinney Services Inc., which was the bank's majority shareholder. Kinney National Company later merged with Warner Bros. to become Warner Communications.

Shortly after taking over, Mr. Agemian changed the bank's name to Garden State National Bank, and, a year later, merged with North Jersey National Bank of Hudson County. Because of the Federal Bank Holding Corporation Act, Warner was forced to divest its stake in the Garden State National Bank. After an initial divestiture attempt was derailed by a dissident board member, William A. Conway, who claimed that it allowed Warner Communications to exit at a profit at the expense of certain minority shareholders, Garden State ultimately merged in 1980 with Fidelity Union Bancorporation of Newark. This transaction required Mr. Agemian's resignation from the Warner Communications board so he could continue as chairman and chief executive officer of Garden State.

The remnants of Garden State National Bank have changed hands through a series of mergers that began in 1984. Fidelity Union Bancorporation merged with First National Bank of New Jersey, and the combined company became known as First Fidelity Bank the next year. That company would later merge with First Union, which in turn was acquired by Wachovia, which was sold to Wells Fargo after the 2008 financial crisis.
