= Howard Milstein =

American banker and businessman (born 1951)

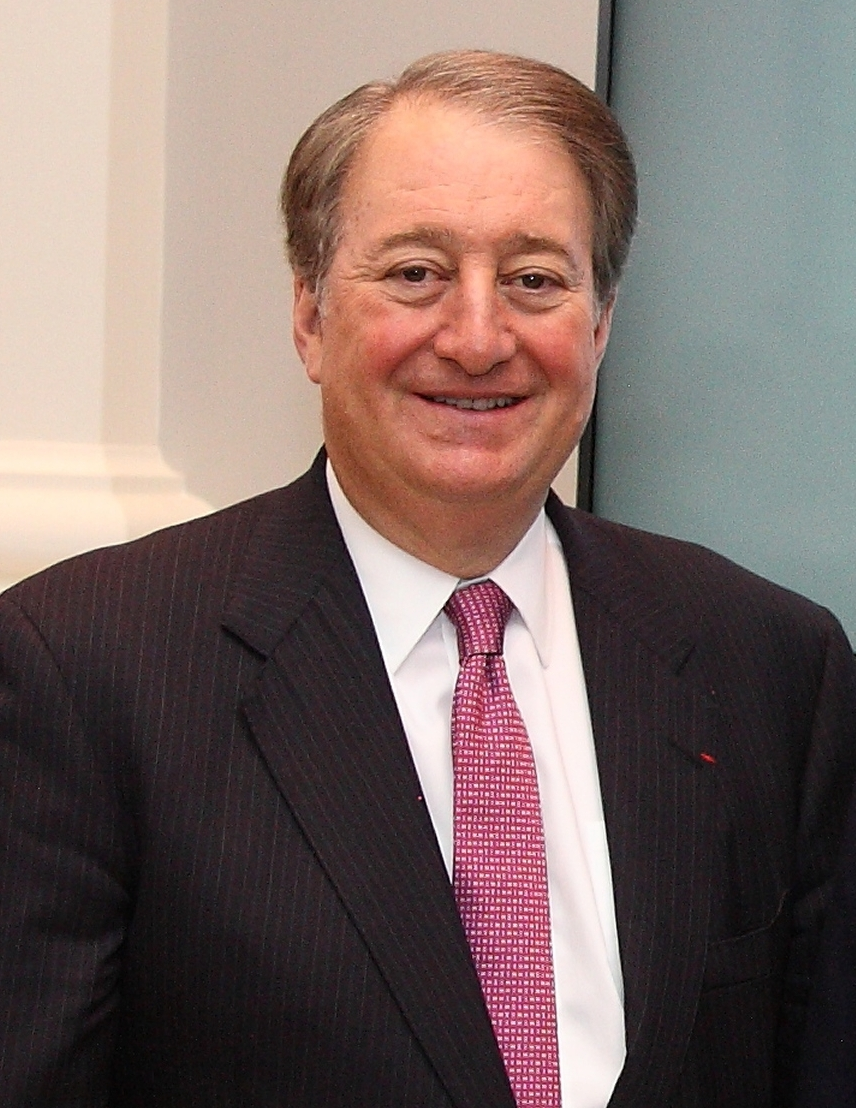
- Milstein in 2015
- Born: 15 May 1951 (age 75)
- Education: Cornell University (BA); Harvard University (JD, MBA)
- Occupations: Banker, real estate developer
- Spouse: Abby Sniderman (m. 1976)
- Children: 1
- Parent(s): Irma Cameron Milstein; Paul Milstein
- Family: Seymour Milstein (uncle); Philip L. Milstein (cousin)

Howard Philip Milstein (born 1950 or 1951) is an American businessman. Milstein is chairman, president and chief executive officer of New York Private Bank & Trust and its operating bank, Emigrant Bank. He served as chairman of the New York State Thruway Authority until November 2014 and led the procurement process for the replacement of the Tappan Zee Bridge. He is chairman of Milstein Properties.

== Early life and education ==
Milstein is the son of Irma Milstein and Paul Milstein, a real estate developer. He graduated from Cornell University with a B.A. in economics in 1973 and from Harvard University with a JD/MBA in 1977. He is a member of the New York State Bar.

== Career ==
Milstein started his career at the investment bank Warburg Paribas Becker. In 2003, Milstein co-founded the merchant bank FreidbergMilstein. Since 2004, he has run Emigrant Bank, and he serves as chairman, president, and chief executive officer of the bank's holding company, New York Private Bank & Trust. In 2016, a Brooklyn jury found Emigrant Bank to have targeted minorities with predatory mortgages with rates of up to 18 percent. While these loans are now illegal, Milstein testified at trial that the lending was a community service because it provided capital for people who could otherwise not afford it. Between 2004 and 2009, the amount of delinquent loans at the bank had doubled from around 25% to 50%, with the highest commissions paid to employees who brought in subprime loans.

He is chairman of Sarasota Private Bank & Trust and Cleveland Private Bank & Trust, both with majority ownership by Milstein and his family along with local co-founders. Milstein is chairman of Milstein Properties, a builder and investor active in both residential and commercial development primarily in New York City.

Milstein and his brother, Edward, worked with their father on numerous building projects in Manhattan. In the late 1980s, the Milstein family acquired Douglas Elliman-Gibbons & Ives real estate brokerage, and Milstein served as its chairman for ten years until the business was sold. In 1986, Milstein started Liberty Cable as an alternative telecommunications supplier for the Milford Plaza Hotel. In 2018, Milstein launched a technology campus in midtown for technology companies.

In 2007, Milstein acquired, through Emigrant Bank, a full partnership interest in Nicklaus Companies, LLC, becoming executive chairman of the company, working with professional golfer Jack Nicklaus. The business was primarily centered in golf course design, golf equipment, and licensing for clothing and other items. In 2018, Milstein formed 8AM Golf, the holding company for Nicklaus Companies, which operates various global golfing brands, including Golf Magazine and Golf.com. On September 20, 2023, 8AM Golf announced a new golf-themed venture in collaboration with Tiger Woods and Justin Timberlake to open a sports bar in Manhattan, New York.

== Civic ==
In November 2010, Milstein was selected by Andrew Cuomo to be on the incoming New York governor's transition team as a member of the Committee on Economic Development & Labor. In June 2011, the New York State Senate unanimously confirmed Milstein as chair of the New York State Thruway Authority.

== Philanthropy ==
In 2005, Milstein led Emigrant Bank in depositing $1,000 to bank customers whose homes were directly impacted by Hurricane Katrina. After Superstorm Sandy in 2012, Milstein and the bank donated $2.3 million in total to more than 2,000 New York Police and firefighter first responders.

In 2012, Milstein and his wife, Abby, vice chairman of the New York Public Library, committed to donate $8 million to the New York Public Library.

In 2017, Milstein announced a $20 million donation to Cornell University. Milstein runs the Howard & Abby Milstein Foundation. He serves as chairman of the American Skin Association, and sits on the boards of the Nicklaus Children's Health Care Foundation, and the National September 11 Memorial Foundation. He is the former chairman of the New York Blood Center.

== Personal life ==
He is married to Abby Sniderman Milstein, chair of the Board of Trustees of the New York Public Library. They have one son, Michael, born in 1989. Michael is co-chief executive officer of Emigrant Bank, co-President of Emigrant Bank and Milstein Properties, and serves as co-chair of 8AM Golf. In 2017, Howard and Michael Milstein contributed $20 million for the Milstein Program in Technology and Humanity, a collaboration between the College of Arts & Sciences at Cornell University and Cornell Tech.
