= Sarah Maslin Nir =

American journalist (born 1983)

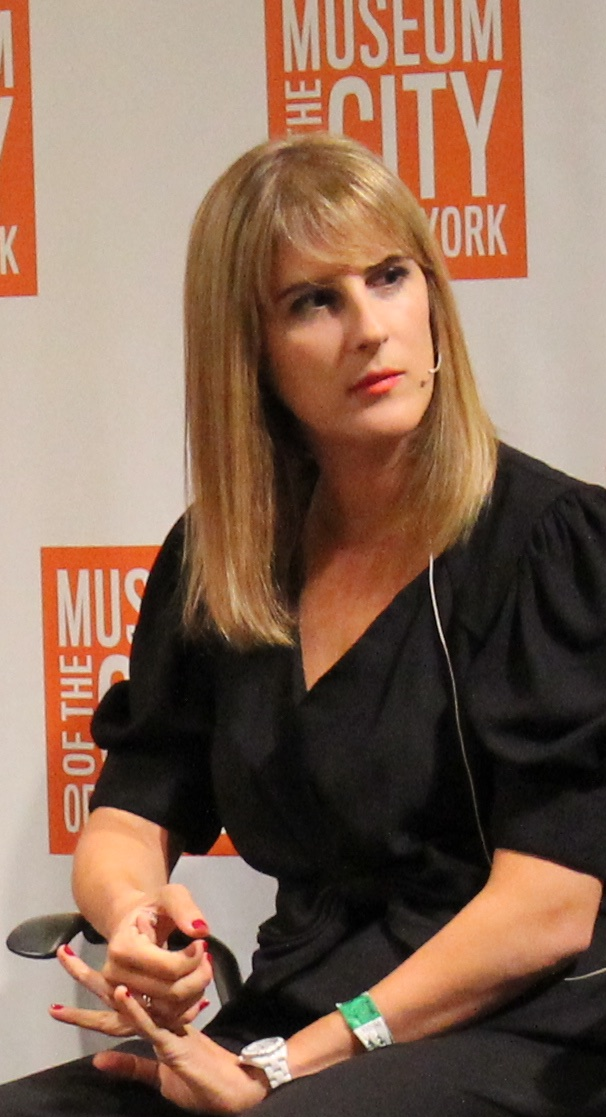
- Sarah Maslin Nir at "Living City, Living Wage" discussion in 2015
- Born: March 23, 1983 (age 43); Manhattan, New York City, United States
- Education: Political science and philosophy
- Alma mater: Columbia University, Columbia School of Journalism
- Occupation: Journalist
- Years active: 2010-present
- Employer: The New York Times
- Known for: Reporting on nail salon labor conditions (Unvarnished)
- Notable work: Unvarnished; Horse Crazy: The Story of a Woman and a World in Love with an Animal
- Parent(s): Yehuda Nir; Bonnie Maslin
- Awards: New York Newswomen's Club Award for In-Depth Reporting (2015); Pulitzer Prize finalist for Local Reporting (2016)

Sarah Maslin Nir (born March 23, 1983) is an American journalist, best known for her New York Times report on the working conditions of nail salon workers, for which she was a finalist for the 2016 Pulitzer Prize for Local Reporting. The story generated both extensive regulatory changes and extensive criticism.

== Early life and education ==
The daughter of psychiatrist Yehuda Nir and psychologist Bonnie Maslin, Nir was born and grew up in Manhattan, attending Brearley School. Nir graduated from Columbia University in 2008, majoring in political science and philosophy. As an undergraduate, she was the Style Editor of the Columbia Daily Spectator. She is also a graduate of the Columbia School of Journalism (2009). Before attending journalism school, Nir lived in London and worked as a freelancer for several U.S. and international publications.

== Career ==
Nir initially freelanced for the Times, contributing to 11 sections of the paper. She covered New York City's nightlife for the Times from 2010 until the end of 2011, as the paper's "Nocturnalist" columnist, once attending 25 parties in five days. She became a trainee reporter in 2011 and worked as a rewrite reporter for late-night news, during which time she camped out overnight at Zuccotti Park with the Occupy Wall Street protesters, and later reported on the dismantling of the camp. She was promoted to staff reporter covering Queens for the Metro section in May, 2013. In February, 2015, she became a general assignment reporter focusing on Manhattan.

In May 2015, Nir's "Unvarnished" exposé on the working conditions of manicurists in New York City and elsewhere and the health hazards to which they are exposed attracted wide attention, resulting in emergency workplace enforcement actions by New York governor Andrew Cuomo.

In August 2020, Nir published Horse Crazy which explores why so many people—including herself—are obsessed with horses.

== Controversies ==
In February 2013, in an article on post-Hurricane Sandy recovery efforts in heavily Irish-American Breezy Point, Queens, Nir wrote about the community's lack of diversity and allegations of prejudice. These allegations were criticized by Niall O'Dowd and other Irish-American community leaders, who stated that the assertions amounted to a "clichéd stereotyping" of the neighborhood by Nir.

In July 2015, Unvarnished's claims of widespread "astonishingly low" wages were challenged by former New York Times reporter Richard Bernstein, in the New York Review of Books. Bernstein, whose wife owns two nail salons, asserted that such wages were inconsistent with his personal experience, and were not evidenced by ads in the Chinese-language papers cited by the story. NYT editorial staff subsequently published a rebuttal, refuting Bernstein's criticisms with examples of several published ads and criticizing his response as industry advocacy. The independent NYT Public Editor also reported that she had previously corresponded with Bernstein and looked into his complaints, and expressed her belief that the story's reporting was sound. In August 2015, several nail salons temporarily shut in protest against the new law requiring salons to purchase wage bonds as security for any unpaid wages.

In September and October 2015, hundreds of nail salon owners and workers protested at the NYT offices several times, in response to the story and the ensuing New York State crackdown. (A fifth protest was also held a year later after at the "NYT" offices in response to a new rule instituted by Governor Cuomo in response to the article requiring all nail salons in New York State to have ventilation systems, the first such rule in the country.)

In October 2015, Reason published a three part re-reporting of the story by Jim Epstein, charging that the series was filled with misquotes and factual errors with respect to both its claims of illegally low wages and of health hazards. Epstein also argued that the NYT had mistranslated the ads cited in its rebuttal of Bernstein, and that those ads actually validated Bernstein's argument. In November 2015, the NYT public editor concluded that the exposé's "findings, and the language used to express them, should have been dialed back — in some instances substantially" and recommended that "The Times write further follow-up stories, including some that re-examine its original findings and that take on the criticism from salon owners and others — not defensively but with an open mind."

In November 2015, a follow-on nail salons story by Nir charged that state legislator Ron Kim had reversed his position on nail salon reforms after receiving an influx of campaign contributions from nail salon owners. Shortly afterward, Reason and Crain's New York Business published stories refuting those allegations.

In December 2015, the Columbia Journalism Review investigated the effects of Nir's Unvarnished series on nail salon workers and owners, concluding that many nail salon workers were empowered and saw working conditions improved as a result of attention and legal reforms spurred by the reporting. The article praised Nir's exposure of exploitation and racism within the nail salon industry, but also acknowledged criticisms of her reporting, finding that "At times, though, Nir does seem to overstate the case against salon owners."

== Awards and recognition ==
In September 2015, Nir was recognized with the New York Newswomen's Club award for in-depth reporting.

In November 2015, The Forward named Nir one of the 2015 Forward 50.

Nir was a finalist for the 2016 Pulitzer Prize in Local Reporting for Unvarnished.
