= Riverside Memorial Chapel =

American Jewish funeral home chain

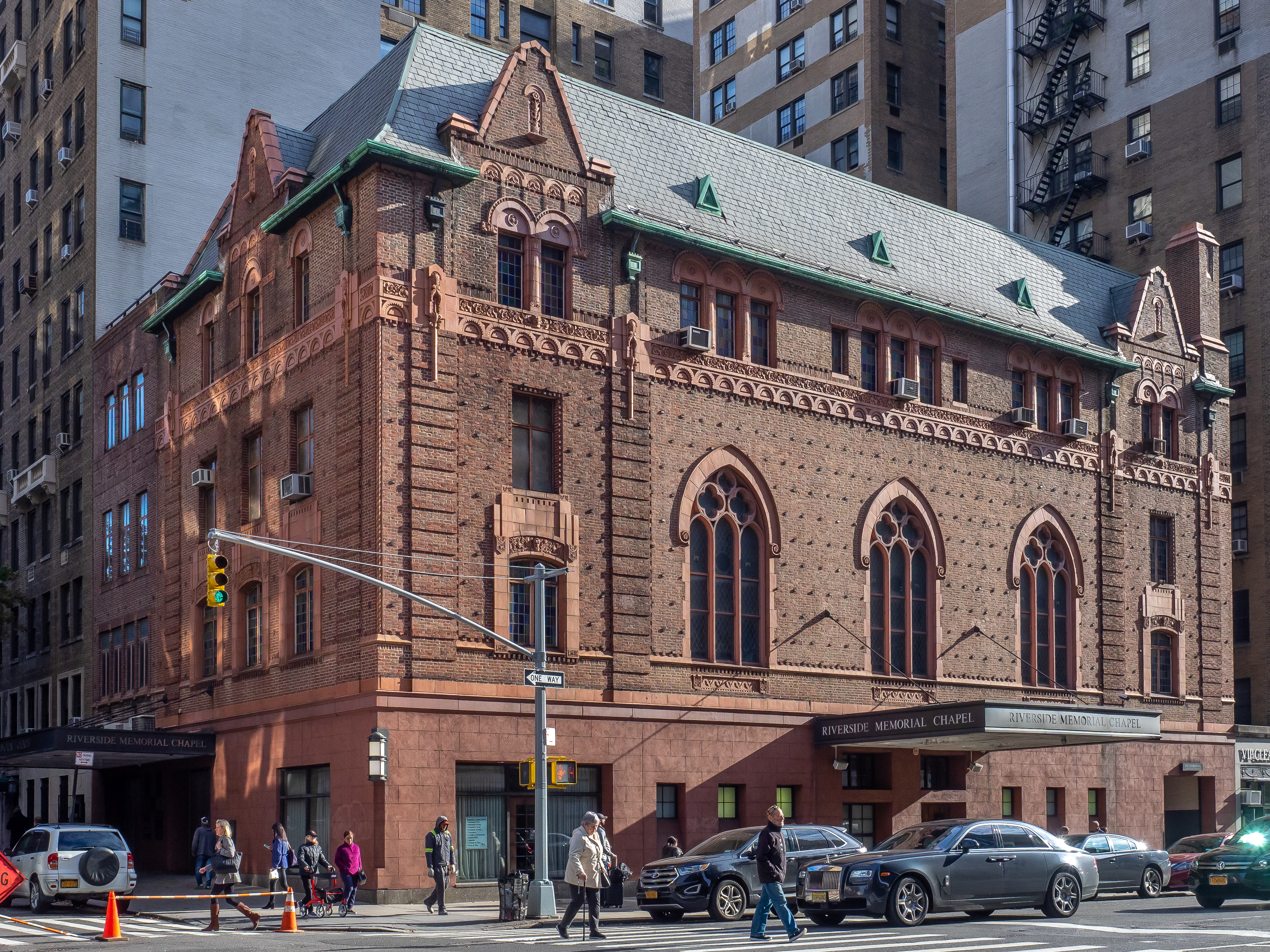
- Main facility in 2019
- Formerly: Meyers Livery Stable (1897–1905); Meyers Undertakers (1905–1916); Meyers & Company (1916–1933)
- Type: Subsidiary
- Founded: 1897; 129 years ago
- Founder: Louis Meyers
- Headquarters: Manhattan, New York, New York, United States
- Parent: Service Corporation International (1971–present)

The Riverside Memorial Chapel is an American Jewish funeral home chain with their main facility at 180 West 76th Street on the Upper West Side of Manhattan, New York City. The company has been owned by Service Corporation International since 1971.

== History ==
Riverside Memorial Chapel was founded as Meyers Livery Stable in 1897 by Louis Meyers on Norfolk Street on the Lower East Side of Manhattan.

In 1905, the business was relocated to 54 East 109th Street and the name was changed to Meyers Undertakers. In 1916, the business was relocated to 228 Lenox Avenue (at 122nd Street) in Harlem and the name changed to Meyers & Company. In 1926, they moved to 180 West 76th Street and Amsterdam Avenue on the Upper West Side and built a large four story chapel. In 1933, they divided into two separate companies, Riverside Memorial Chapel and Parkwest Chapels. The funeral company was headed by Charles Rosenthal. They expanded thereafter to Miami, Florida (1935); Brooklyn (1938); the Bronx (1940); and Westchester County, New York (1950). The company, then owned by the founder's grandson, Edward Rosenthal, expanded via acquisitions acquiring the Frank E. Campbell Funeral Chapel (1948), the Universal Funeral Chapel (1955); and the Walter B. Cooke Chapel (1957) to become the largest funeral company in the United States. In 1958, Rosenthal retired and ceded control to his son-in-law Steve Ross.

In 1961, the company was merged with the Kinney Parking Company (then, renamed as Kinney Service Corporation) and taken public. In June 1971, Riverside Memorial Chapel was purchased by Service Corporation International.

== Notable funerals and memorial services ==
- Alvin Achenbaum
- Joey Adams
- Bert Berns
- J. Sidney Bernstein
- Meyer Bloomfield
- Grace Borgenicht Brandt
- Julie Braun-Vogelstein
- Paula Danziger
- David Deutsch (ad executive)
- Simon Federbusch
- Arnold Fine
- Sidney Frank
- Louis D. Gibbs
- Madeline Lee Gilford
- Gilbert Gottfried
- Lazarus Joseph (1891–1966), NY State Senator and New York City Comptroller.
- Al Kelly
- Alan King
- Emanuel Lasker
- Nat Lefkowitz
- Al Lewis
- Malvina Longfellow
- Lewis Merenstein
- Vivian Nathan
- Yehuda Nir
- Marni Nixon
- Maurice Paprin
- Henry G. Plitt
- Leopold Prince
- Joan Rivers
- Richard C. Ross
- Eric Siday
- Eduard Steuermann
- Morton Sweig
- Jerome Toobin
- Sol Ullman
- Abe Vigoda
- Morris D. Waldman
- Hannah Weinstein
- Dr. Ruth Westheimer
