= Yehuda Nir =

American psychiatrist (1930–2014)

- Born: Juliusz Gruenfeld; March 31, 1930; Lwów, Second Polish Republic (present-day Lviv, Ukraine)
- Died: July 19, 2014 (aged 84); Manhattan, New York City
- Resting place: Mount Olives, Jerusalem
- Citizenship: Poland; United States
- Occupations: Psychiatrist; Author
- Years active: 1959-2014
- Employer: Memorial Sloan Kettering Cancer Center (1979-1986)
- Known for: Holocaust survivor; "The Lost Childhood"
- Notable work: "The Lost Childhood" (1989; Scholastic 2002); "Not Quite Paradise: Making Marriage Work"; "Loving Men for ALl the Right Reasons"
- Spouse: Bonnie Maslin
- Children: 4: Sarah Maslin Nir (daughter); David (son); Daniel (son); Aaron (son)

Yehuda Nir (March 31, 1930 – July 19, 2014) was a Polish-born American Holocaust survivor, psychiatrist and author of The Lost Childhood. Nir posed as a Roman Catholic and learned Latin to escape Nazi persecution in Poland during World War II. Nir's ordeal led him to a career as a psychiatrist, specializing in the treatment of post-traumatic stress disorder and severely ill children. He immigrated to the United States in 1959 to complete medical residencies in New York City and Philadelphia. He served as the chief of child psychiatry of Memorial Sloan Kettering Cancer Center from 1979 until 1986.

Nir was born Juliusz Gruenfeld in Lwów, Poland, (present-day Lviv, Ukraine) on March 31, 1930. He later changed his name to "Nir" after World War II since "Gruenfeld" has German origins. Nir means 'plowed fields' in Hebrew.

Nir released a memoir of his experience during the Holocaust, The Lost Childhood, in 1989. A second edition was reprinted by Scholastic Press in 2002. The Lost Childhood is now used as part of the high school curriculum throughout the United States. He also published four self-help books focusing on relationships, including Not Quite Paradise: Making Marriage Work and Loving Men for All the Right Reasons.

Yehuda Nir died at his home in Manhattan, New York City, on July 19, 2014, at the age of 84. His funeral was held at Riverside Memorial Chapel on the Upper West Side, with burial on the Mount of Olives in Jerusalem. He was survived by his wife Bonnie Maslin and their children: daughter Sarah, a reporter for The New York Times; and son David, the political director of Daily Kos; and two sons from a previous marriage: private investor Daniel and fashion executive Aaron.
