= Leopold Prince =

American politician

Leopold Prince (June 2, 1880 – August 17, 1951) was a German-born Jewish-American lawyer, politician, judge, and amateur conductor from New York.

== Life ==
Prince was born on June 2, 1880, in Konitz, Prussia, Germany, the son of Heyman Prince and Sophia Jordan. He immigrated to America when he was eleven.

Prince attended New York City public schools, the City College of New York, and the New York University School of Law, graduating from the latter school with an LL.B. in 1900. He was admitted to the bar shortly afterwards and began practicing law.

Prince was a member of the Tammany Hall General Committee. In 1904, he was elected to the New York State Assembly as a Democrat, representing the New York County 32nd District. He served in the Assembly in 1905. He lost the re-election to the Assembly that year to Republican Samuel Krulewitch. In 1906, he was elected back to the Assembly in the New York County 26th District with nominations from the Democratic Party and the Independence League over Republican Solomon Strauss. He served again in the Assembly in 1907.

In 1907, Prince was elected Justice of the Municipal Court. He was re-elected to that office until 1937, when he became an official referee of the court and worked on the Small Claims Part. As Justice, he helped bring about an amendment to Municipal Court law that abolished seizure of tenants' furniture in dispossess cases. When he first became Justice at the age of 27, he was one of the youngest people to ever hold that office.

Prince began playing the violin in an orchestra in City College. In 1927, he and his son Daniel, an amateur violinist, began to play together in their home. They were soon joined by another part-time violinist and a cellist. By 1931, the orchestra had 75 members, was known as the Symphonic Ensemble, and gave its first major concert at Wadleigh High School. The orchestra, which later grew to a 110-piece group, then began concert series in Central Park in the summer and in the Museum of Natural History in the winter. Fiorello La Guardia, who often attended its performances and was instrumental in having friends make annual contributions to support it, gave the orchestra the name the City Amateur Symphony Orchestra. Prince later became its conductor, spent 20,000 dollars of his own money to support the group, and in April 1951 was given a distinguished service medal from the Music Lovers League for his contribution to the city's musical life. His last session as conductor was only two weeks before his death.

Prince was elected executive vice-president of the Austrian Chamber of Commerce of the United States of America when it was founded in 1946. He was a member of the Free Sons of Israel, the Knights of Pythias, the Fraternal Order of Eagles, the New York City Bar Association, and the New York County Lawyers' Association. He was a trustee of Beth David Hospital. In 1907, he married Hedwig Prince. They had one son, Daniel.

Prince died from a cerebral hemorrhage at Mary Hitchcock Memorial Hospital in Hanover, New Hampshire, on August 17, 1951. He was on vacation in nearby Enfield at the time. His funeral was at Riverside Memorial Chapel. He was buried in Ferncliff Cemetery in Hartsdale.

New York State Assembly
Preceded by Julius Brosen	New York State Assembly; New York County, 32nd District; 1905	Succeeded by Samuel Krulewitch
Preceded by Roger J. Brennan	New York State Assembly; New York County, 26th District; 1907	Succeeded by Solomon Strauss
