= New York Private Bank & Trust =

American bank holding company

New York Private Bank & Trust Corporation is a bank holding company headquartered in New York City, United States. Howard Milstein is the chairman, president and CEO. As of early 2007, it had US$17.3 billion in assets and was the 50th largest bank holding company in the United States. As of March 31, 2019 its assets were US$5.716 billion. The company had 1,221 employees in 2019.

== History ==
- 2003 - ESB ACQUISITION CORP. was established as a Bank Holding Company
- 2004 - ESB ACQUISITION CORP. changed to the new name NEW YORK PRIVATE BANK & TRUST CORPORATION
- 2006 - New York Private Bank & Trust Corporation changed from Bank Holding Company to Financial Holding Company - Domestic.
- 2010 - voluntarily relinquished FDIC deposit insurance and changed legal name to New York Private Trust Company

== Subsidiaries ==
Name	Asset size (Q1 2019)
Emigrant Bank	US$5.696 billion
Emigrant Mercantile Bank	US$3.439 million
