= Seymour Milstein =

American real estate developer and philanthropist (1920–2001)

- Born: July 21, 1920; New York City, U.S.
- Died: October 2, 2001 (aged 81); New York City, U.S.
- Education: New York University (BA)
- Occupation: Real estate developer
- Spouse: Vivian Leiner
- Children: 2, including Philip L. Milstein
- Family: Paul Milstein (brother); Howard Milstein (nephew)

Seymour Milstein (July 21, 1920 – October 2, 2001) was an American real estate developer and philanthropist.

== Early life and education ==
Milstein was born to a Jewish family in Manhattan and raised in the Bronx. His father was Morris Milstein, an immigrant from Zhytomyr, Ukraine (in what was then the Russian Empire) who started out as a floor scraper. In 1919, Morris founded the Circle Floor Company, Inc., a wood flooring business. Later in 1945, his father also founded the Mastic Tile Company, a vinyl floor tile manufacturer.

In 1941, Milstein graduated from New York University. Soon after, he began working for his father's Mastic Tile Company, and became its president in 1955. Milstein's brother, Paul Milstein, became president of the Circle Floor Company in 1961. In 1959, Mastic Tile was sold to Ruberoid for $24 million. Circle Floor expanded into floor tiles, acoustical ceilings, and drywall construction and won contracts to install flooring in several New York landmarks including Rockefeller Center, the United Nations Building, and both John F Kennedy Airport and LaGuardia Airport. By 1966, Circle Floor had become the largest subcontractor of floor, wall and ceiling construction in the United States.

== Career ==
In the late 1950s, Milstein and his brother Paul founded Milstein Properties and branched out into real estate. Paul was the aggressive frontman and deal-maker while Seymour was the contemplative financier who preferred to work behind the scenes. This difference is temperament led them to be coined "the diplomat and the barbarian." In 1964, they completed their first large real estate development, the 34-story, 680-unit Dorchester Towers on the Upper West Side. Circle Floor Company was sold to Kinney Parking Company (then run by Steve Ross) in 1964 for $15 million while Paul remained as manager of the unit 1971.

From 1964 to 1973, Seymour Milstein was the chairman of the Bronx-Lebanon Hospital Center.

In 1974, the Milsteins entered the mining and energy sectors, acquiring United Brands, the parent company of Chiquita Bananas, after the suicide of its owner Eli M. Black. In 1981, the Milsteins stripped the New York Biltmore Hotel down to its steel structure and reclad the frame in granite, despite the building's landmark status and concerted protests by preservationists, in order to fashion a new headquarters for Bank of America. In 1986, the Milsteins acquired the Emigrant Savings Bank, which they built into the largest privately owned bank in the country. In 1986, they founded Liberty Cable Co.

In 1989, the Milstein family acquired Douglas Elliman-Gibbons & Ives residential real estate brokerage from Edwin J. Gould and Lawrence O. McGauley. They hired new brokers and expanded its geography from the Upper East Side to the entire city. At the time of purchase Douglas Elliman had 10% of the New York City brokerage market and managed 15,000 apartments. His nephew, Howard Milstein was chairman for ten years and built the brand to a 40% share of the brokerage market and over 50,000 apartments managed. Douglas Elliman was sold to Insignia Financial Group in two transactions for a total sum of $85 million: the management division was sold in 1995 and the brokerage division was sold in 1999. Howard and his father Paul did not inform Seymour about the transaction indicating that they were not required to do so as their side of the family had an aggregate 60% ownership of the partnership (20% by Paul Milstein and 10% with each of Paul's children). This led to a deterioration of the relationship between the two elder brothers, eventually leading to litigation and the unwinding of their long business partnership.

Through various family controlled entities, the Milsteins built or bought residential properties with more than 50,000 apartments, 8,000 hotel rooms and 20,000,000 square feet (1,900,000 m^{2}) of office space.

== Philanthropy ==
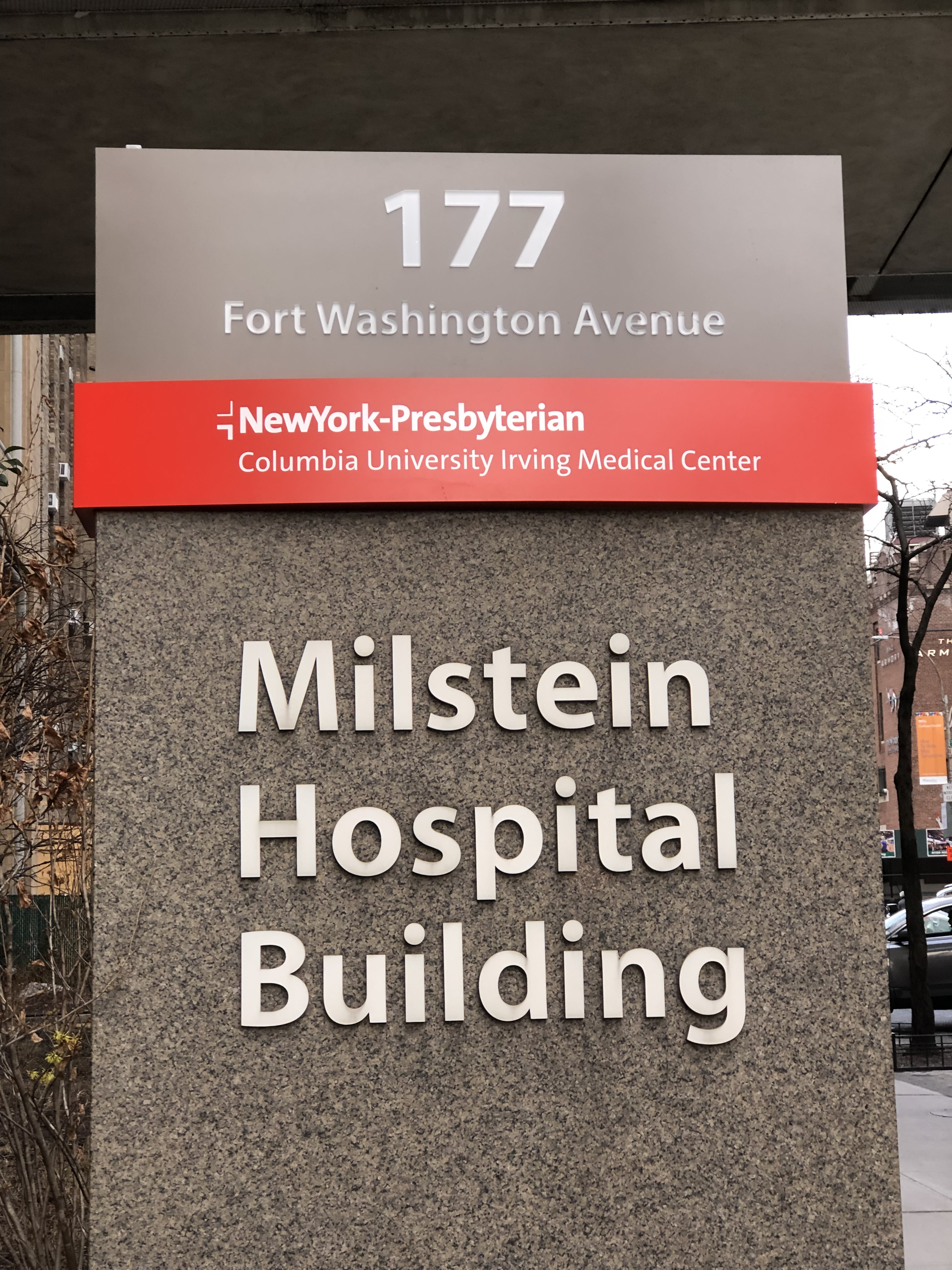

Milstein funded the Vivian and Seymour Milstein Family Heart Center at NewYork–Presbyterian Hospital/Columbia Medical Center. Milstein was on the board of the then Columbia-Presbyterian Hospital and remained through the 1998 merger with New York Hospital.

Seymour Milstein's early insights into the critical importance of interferons led him to Sidney Pestka, one of the scientists at the forefront of interferon research and an active member of the former ISICR (International Society for Interferon and Cytokine Research), now known as the ICIS, International Cytokine & Interferon Society. Milstein's interest in fostering continued investigations in this emerging field, and his family's tradition of support for organizations dedicated to patient care and scientific research, motivated him and his wife Vivian to establish The Milstein Awards in 1988, two years after interferon was first approved for the treatment of hairy cell leukemia.

The Seymour & Vivian Milstein Award for Excellence in Interferon and Cytokine Research, commonly known as The Milstein Award, recognizes individuals who have made exceptional contributions to interferon and cytokine research, either in a basic or applied field. Many of these achievements have led to the advancement of human health. Milstein's son Philip continues to support this award, along with The Milstein Young Investigator Awards, which recognize the work of individuals who have made an impact on interferon and cytokine research early in their careers, and The Milstein Travel Awards, which give those who may not otherwise be able to attend the Annual Meeting of the ICIS an opportunity to share the most current interferon and cytokine knowledge with peers around from the world.

== Personal life and death ==
In 1945, Milstein married Vivian Leiner. They had two children: Constance Milstein, who is married to Saïd Abu-Kaud; and Philip L. Milstein, who is married to Cheryl Sue Glicker.

In 2001, Seymour Milstein died of pneumonia. Upon his death, the remaining partnership agreements between him and his brother were unwound. The ownership structure underlying all the partnerships was set up with Paul and Seymour each with a 20% share; and the six nieces and nephews (the four children of Paul and the two children of Seymour) with 10% each. An acrimonious legal tussle resulted between the two sides of the family with Paul's side claiming majority control since the sum of their interest was 60%.
