= Nat Lefkowitz =

American talent agency executive

- Born: July 24, 1905; Brooklyn, New York, U.S.
- Died: September 4, 1983 (aged 78); Manhattan, New York, U.S.
- Education: B.A. City College of New York; J.D. Brooklyn Law School
- Occupation: Talent agency executive
- Known for: Co-chairman of the William Morris Agency
- Spouse: Sally Feigelman
- Children: 3
- Family: Ted Ashley (nephew)

Nat Lefkowitz (July 24, 1905 – September 4, 1983) was an American talent agency executive who served as co-chairman of the William Morris Agency.

== Biography ==
Lefkowitz was born to a Jewish family in Brooklyn. He attended New York City public schools and was a graduate of City College of New York and the Brooklyn Law School. After school, he worked as an accountant and then went to work for the William Morris Agency in 1927 where he held a number of positions including comptroller, treasurer, executive vice president, president, and the chairmanship in 1976. His brother Julius Lefkowitz ran the outside accounting firm that William Morris agency used. In 1980, he was replaced by his protégé Morris Stoller after an acrimonious power struggle at the agency. He was named as chairman emeritus.

Lefkowitz was active in served as the chairman of the Jewish Theatrical Guild, as an executive with the United Jewish Appeal, the Federation of Jewish Philanthropies, the Actors Fund, the Will Rogers Memorial Hospital, the O'Donnell Memorial Research Laboratories and the National Conference of Christians and Jews.

== Personal life ==
He was married to Sally Feigelman; they had three daughters, Dorothy Lefkowitz Litwin, Rona Lefkowitz Pinkus Forstadt, and Helene Andrea Lefkowitz Nachtigall. He died on September 4, 1983, in Manhattan after complications from heart surgery. Services were held at Riverside Memorial Chapel. His nephew was Ted Ashley, former chairman of the Warner Bros. film studio (1969–1980) and founder of the Ashley-Famous talent agency.
