= The Lost Childhood (Nir book) =

1989 book by Yehuda Nir

- Title page for The Lost Childhood (1989)
- Author: Yehuda Nir
- Genre: Memoir
- Publication date: 1989

The Lost Childhood is a memoir written by Holocaust survivor Yehuda Nir. Born in 1930, Nir was only nine years old when his father was killed by German soldiers in a mass execution of Jewish men from his hometown, Lwow, in 1941. The story is based on the cunning survival of Nir, his mother and his older sister Lala during six years of his life throughout World War II. With the aid of false documents, a family's will to survive, and despite his loss of innocence, his family managed to escape the cruelty of Nazi concentration camps and potential execution. He and his family "hid" in the open, pretending to be people they were not (Poles), practicing a faith that they did not believe in (Catholicism), and working tireless jobs (for German employers in occupied Warsaw), struggling to conceal the pain they felt when their people were murdered before their eyes; and fearful of being identified. Amidst all the turmoil was a boy trying to make sense of his world, his body, and his place as a human being on Earth.

First published in 1989, the book was republished by Scholastic Press in 2002. The Lost Childhood is now utilized as part of the high school curriculum at schools throughout the United States.

== About the author ==
Yehuda Nir was born in 1930 into a well-off Polish Jewish family and died July 19, 2014. In June 1945, he and his family returned to Poland and he went back to school at the age of fifteen, earning his high school diploma at age twenty-one. He went to Vienna, Austria, to study medicine for four years. He graduated from Jerusalem Medical School in 1957. As of 2001, he was an associate professor of psychiatry at Cornell University Medical College. He was married twice, first to Eva (date unknown), and then to Bonnie in 1973. Nir had two sons from his first marriage and a son and one daughter from his second marriage. His children are Daniel Ludwig, born in 1961, and Aaron, born in 1965. Nir was divorced in 1969 and remarried in 1973; his son David was born in 1977 and daughter Sarah in 1983. He also had a private practice in New York City with his second wife, Dr. Bonnie Maslin. Nir worked at a New York college, and was a frequent speaker on his experiences as a Holocaust survivor.

The intention of this book is to convey to young people that if you take charge of your life rather than passively observe it like a couch potato, you might help to create a world where forgiveness is possible. (Page 282, Epilogue)
