= Morris D. Waldman =

Slovakian-born American rabbi and social worker (1879–1963)

Morris David Waldman (May 1, 1879 – September 7, 1963) was a Slovakian-born American rabbi and social worker.

== Life ==
Waldman was born on May 1, 1879, in Bártfa, Hungary, the son of Benjamin Waldman and Esther Schönfeld.

Waldman immigrated to America when he was four. He received a Ph.B. from New York University in 1898. He also went to the Jewish Theological Seminary from 1895 to 1898 and the Columbia University Graduate School of Semitics and Philosophy from 1898 to 1901. He served as rabbi of Temple Anshe Emeth in New Brunswick, New Jersey, after which he began working in social welfare. He spent several years working on Jewish immigration issues with the Industrial Removal Office. He briefly worked as assistant director of the civilian department of the American Red Cross in Washington, D.C., in 1917. In that year, the Federation for the Support of Jewish Philanthropic Societies of New York City was formed partially because of a survey he made of fourteen other cities that made their own federations. In 1919, he became a trustee of the Federation and treasurer of the Jewish Agricultural Society. He helped organize the Federation of Jewish Charities in Boston (for which he became an honorary trustee for life), reorganized the Brooklyn and Detroit federations, and virtually created Detroit's Jewish community from 1924 to 1928 by getting its federation involved in all the major Jewish philanthropic and educational alliances. He helped create the Bureau of Philanthropic Research in 1915, becoming its honorary secretary, and helped found the Committee for the Care of the Jewish Tuberculosis. He was a lecturer in social sciences for Columbia University from 1916 to 1918 and was a faculty member of the Graduate School of Jewish Social Work from 1928 to 1940. He became a member of the Council for the Jewish Agency for Palestine in 1929 and was a deputy member of its Administrative Committee.

Waldman directed the Galveston Movement from 1906 to 1908. He was managing director of the United Hebrew Charities of New York City from 1908 to 1917, vice-president of the New York State Conference of Charities and Corrections in 1912, president of the New York City Conference of Charities in 1915, and president of the National Conference of Jewish Charities in 1927. From 1921 to 1922, he organized relief for Central European Jewish communities and was European director of the Joint Distribution Committee's War Orphans Department and the Medico-Sanitary Department. He was executive secretary of the American Jewish Committee from 1928 to 1945 and its executive vice-president from 1942 to 1945. He introduced a number of innovations in social work across the country, including the District Service Plan in Boston that focused on family units instead of individual family members, a planned parenthood clinic in Detroit, and Jewish education bureaus that were based on community control. He helped found the National Desertion Bureau, serving as its first chairman. He played a critical role in implementing a human rights provision in the United Nations charter. Initially opponent of Jewish nationalism, he was active in the non-Zionists section of the Jewish Agency for Palestine and represented the non-Zionist side in British-Zionist negotiations on Palestine. However, he unsuccessfully attempted to bring the Zionists and non-Zionists to an agreement at the American Jewish Committee and he later favored the establishment of Israel. His autobiography, Not By Power, came out in 1952. His book Sieg Heil, which discussed Hitler's treatment of Jews, came out in 1963.

In 1901, Waldman married Rose Cypres. Their children were Lynn Pearlstein, Pearl Minkin, and Helen Eliezer.

Waldman died in the Hospital for Joint Diseases on September 7, 1963. His funeral was held in Riverside Memorial Chapel.
