= Samuel Krulewitch =

American politician

Samuel Krulewitch (1871–1937) was an American politician.

Affiliated with the Republican Party and jointly nominated by the Municipal Ownership League, Krulewitch was a member of the 129th New York State Legislature, representing a portion of Manhattan on the New York State Assembly, numbered as the 32nd district. Outside of politics, Krulewitch was involved in the real estate business. He died of heart disease on March 12, 1937, in Manhattan.

New York State Assembly
Preceded by Leopold Prince	New York State Assembly; New York County, 32nd District; 1906	Succeeded by Willoughby B. Dobbs
