= Steve Ross (businessman) =

American businessman (1927–1992)

- Born: Steven Jay Rechnitz; April 5, 1927; New York City, U.S.
- Died: December 20, 1992 (aged 65); Los Angeles, California, U.S.
- Occupation: Businessman
- Known for: Founder of Kinney National Company, Warner Communications and Time Warner
- Spouse(s): Carol Rosenthal (divorced); Amanda Burden (divorced); Courtney Sale
- Children: 4

Steven Jay Ross (né Rechnitz; April 5, 1927 – December 20, 1992) was an American businessman and CEO of Time Warner, Warner Communications, and Kinney National Services, Inc. He is also known for helping to popularize soccer in the United States.

== Early life and education ==
Ross was born Steven Jay Rechnitz on April 5, 1927, in Brooklyn, New York City, the son of Jewish immigrants. His father—who lost all his money during the Great Depression—changed the family name to Ross in hope of finding work with fewer struggles. Ross attended Paul Smith's College for two years and then joined the U.S. Navy. After his military service, he went to work at his uncle's store in the Garment District in Manhattan.

== Career ==
In 1953, he married Carol Rosenthal, the daughter of a Manhattan funeral home owner, Edward Rosenthal, who operated the largest funeral company in the United States, Riverside Memorial Chapel, where he accepted employment as a funeral director. After noticing that the limousines used in funeral processions were not being used at night, he convinced his father-in-law to let him establish a separate company that would lease out the vehicles in the evenings. The company was solidly profitable and enabled Ross to obtain bank financing to start a rental company, Abbey Rent a Car.

He later merged Abbey with a parking lot operator, the Kinney Parking Company, which was then owned by underworld crime figures Manny Kimmel and Abner Zwillman, and added an office cleaning business (which was jointly owned by the funeral home and a cousin of his father-in-law). Kinney was taken public in 1962 with a market valuation of $12.5 million. In 1964, Kinney purchased wood flooring manufacturer Circle Floor from Seymour and Paul Milstein for $15 million with Paul remaining as manager of the unit until 1971.

Ross was company president and moved the firm from downtown New York to 10 Rockefeller Plaza. In 1966, Kinney expanded into the entertainment business by purchasing the Ashley-Famous talent agency (founded by Ted Ashley) and then in 1969, Kinney paid $400 million for the ailing Warner Bros.–Seven Arts film studio and television and record business. Three years later, after spinning off its non-entertainment assets, Kinney National Services renamed itself Warner Communications with Ross as co-CEO from 1969 to 1972.

=== Warner Communications/Time Warner ===
In 1971, Warner expanded into the cable television business by purchasing various small cable companies. Ross competed directly with the Big Three television networks that dominated television broadcasting, believing in the potential of narrowcasting whereby separate cable channels were developed to target specific audiences with narrower interests, mirroring the radio station model. This pioneering approach led to the creation of the successful cable TV channels MTV and Nickelodeon which were both later sold at a great profit.

In 1972, Ross was appointed CEO, president and chairman of Warner Communications. He introduced an incentive-based compensation program and delegated responsibility to his middle managers. His support and commitment to his employees, combined with lucrative financial incentives and a hands-off management style, inspired deep loyalty. Many employees saw him as a father figure: "Steve was very much what I wish my father was," Steven Spielberg said. Spielberg dedicated his 1993 film Schindler's List to Ross.

In 1976, Warner Communications purchased Atari, Inc. and had great success with its Atari 2600 consoles. But by 1983, Atari collapsed in the wake of the video games crash that same year, leaving Warner Communications vulnerable to a hostile takeover. Rupert Murdoch tried to buy Warner, but Ross was able to impede him by selling 20 percent of Warner to Chris-Craft Industries (then controlled by Herbert J. Siegel).

In 1979, needing financing to further expand its cable television business, Ross partnered with American Express, convincing its executives on the potential of selling AmEx credit cards direct to Warner cable TV customers. Warner-AmEx Cable was established and Warner received a much needed capital injection. AmEx's cross-sale expectations never materialized and in 1984, Warner bought out American Express's remaining share. The cable TV business eventually became the cornerstone of the company until being spun off in 2009.

In 1989, Warner Communications was merged with Time Inc. in a $14 billion deal creating the largest media and entertainment company at the time. The merger was seen as a perfect fit: Warner's business was 40 percent international while Time's business was 91% percent domestic; Warner had no magazines while Time had 23 titles; Warner had the world's largest record business while Time was not involved in music; and both were big in the capital intensive cable business where economies of scale mattered. Originally advertised as a combination of equals with both Ross and J. Richard Munro of Time Inc. listed as Co-Chief Operating Officers, within a year of the merger, Ross became the sole CEO. By 1990, Time Warner owned Time, People and Sports Illustrated magazines (the three largest advertising draws in American publishing); the Warner Bros. studio in Hollywood; the Warner, Atlantic, Elektra and Asylum record companies; Warner Books; DC Comics; Home Box Office and some of the country's largest cable television systems.

== Visionary ==
Ross moved before many of his competitors to bet heavily on the worldwide potential of cable television, records, videos, and other experiments. Some of his ideas were successful and others failed, but he influenced the development of media and entertainment with his ideas. "If you're not a risk-taker," he once said, "you should get the hell out of business."

Ross's early interest in cable television helped him envision narrowcasting—cable channels created for specific audiences—MTV and Nickelodeon were expressly launched and developed to serve young audiences. Today, these two channels are still successful, and the cable television universe is now filled with hundreds of channels, specializing in many topics.

Other projects that Ross supported were not as successful as MTV and Nickelodeon, but certainly left a mark in television and helped shape the TV we are enjoying today. One important project was QUBE. Qube was launched in 1977 in Columbus, Ohio and was Ross' vision of how television could become interactive. Although this trial was not successful, it was an important step for what became known as advanced television. In some ways, the Qube project failed because it was ahead of its time. QUBE led to further attempts by Warner to integrate more services to cable television. Prominent among these was the Full Service Network that was launched in 1994 in Orlando, Florida. Ross also supported Atari from 1977 to 1983, taking the first widely successful video game console to millions of homes around the world. For several years, Atari was a lucrative business for Warner Communications, but in 1983 it collapsed. Although many of Ross' overly ambitious projects failed, some of these failures shaped future success in the video game and cable industries.

== Soccer ==
Known for promoting and popularizing soccer in the United States, Ross was amongst the group of people who founded the New York Cosmos in 1971. Backed by his employer Warner Communications, the club brought soccer superstars Pelé and Franz Beckenbauer, as well as other prominent players such as Carlos Alberto, Vladislav Bogićević, Johan Neeskens, and Giorgio Chinaglia.

Ross was introduced to the sport during the late 1960s by one of his business executives Nesuhi Ertegun from Atlantic Records, the record company co-founded by Nesuhi's brother and also soccer enthusiast Ahmet Ertegun. The two brothers worked for Ross in the early 1970s after Atlantic got bought in 1967 by Warner Bros.-Seven Arts that in turn got bought by Ross's Kinney National Company two years later. When Nesuhi Ertegun had a business opportunity that would require leaving the company, Ross offered anything in an attempt to keep him. Ertegun expressed a desire to have a soccer club created and Ross, a fan of sports in general, obliged. Following the 1970 FIFA World Cup in Mexico that the Erteguns used to further establish contacts in the soccer world by throwing lavish parties, one of which was attended by Pelé, the brothers came back to New York and held Ross to his promise. In turn, Ross and longtime associate Jay Emmett reached out to eight other top executives and convinced them to contribute $35,000 each towards establishing a new soccer franchise that would compete in the struggling North American Soccer League.

=== Founding the New York Cosmos ===
The New York Cosmos was created in early 1971 with Englishman Clive Toye as its first general manager and 37-year-old Gordon Bradley as the player and eventually, coach. Playing out their debut season with a small fanbase, the Cosmos were a semi-professional operation, but most importantly, Ross was interested to see the team perform well. Scared of losing money, the ten original investors sold their stake in the franchise to newly created Warner Communications (the company where Ross was CEO and chairman) for $1. With the sale, Ross added the franchise to the vast media empire he was in charge of running.

=== Bringing Pelé to America ===
Following the first few seasons in obscurity, Ross decided that signing a big marquee name was the way forward to achieving greater prominence and ultimately securing the league's long-term dream—a network television deal.

The idea of bringing Pelé to America had actually been around for a while as NASL commissioner Phil Woosnam and eventual Cosmos GM Clive Toye discussed it as far back as 1970 and even made an approach to the player in spring 1971, one month after the Cosmos had been formed. However, in 1975 with Ross willing to spend the big money, conditions were finally there to make the dream transfer happen. He sent Emmett, Toye, Cosmos vice-president Raphael de la Sierra, and Nesuhi Ertegun to Brazil where they met with 34-year-old Pelé at a seaside resort and played soccer with him on the beach. Since by this time Real Madrid and Juventus also started sniffing around Pelé in an attempt to bring him to Europe for the first time, the Cosmos delegation used the possibility of making soccer big in a country new to the sport as their main lure and by the end of the day, the Brazilian agreed in principle to come to New York. The actual negotiation with Warner Communications lawyer Norman Samnick, who was deployed to Brazil by Ross, turned out to be a little more difficult: Ross was willing to risk $2 million for three years of play while Pelé demanded $5 million for two years. In the end, the deal agreed was a complex five-part contract worth around $4.5 million in total that included $1 million for three years of play, $1 million for ten years of marketing rights, $1 million for a fourteen-year PR contract, and another $1 million for a music contract. Warner Communications money thus managed to lure arguably then still the biggest name in soccer out of retirement. In addition to huge amounts of money, due to Pelé's special status in Brazil as the country's national treasure, getting him to leave his homeland for the first time in his career involved a lot of politics as well, especially when the Brazilian president demanded that Pelé play another year in Brazil for the "good of his people". Ross called on his political connections in an attempt to soften the Brazilian government's position and eventually managed to get to the US Secretary of State Henry Kissinger, who personally called his Brazilian counterpart telling him that Pelé's move to New York would be a huge step forward in the US–Brazil relations.

=== More big names arrive in New York ===
Since the Cosmos failed to make the playoffs in Pelé's debut season, for the next season, Ross decided to complement his superstar with more prominent names from overseas, the biggest of which was 29-year-old temperamental Italian striker Giorgio Chinaglia from S.S. Lazio. The striker became an undeniable goal-scoring hit on the pitch with 19 goals in 19 league appearances that season, but his style of play as well as his egotistical and arrogant manner also got him many detractors both within and outside of the club. However, he endeared himself to Ross as the two soon became very close friends. Due to increased interest, the team moved to Yankee Stadium. Though the Brazilian midfield organizer and the Italian striker quickly developed an uneasy relationship, thanks to their assists and goals, respectively, the club managed to make the playoffs, losing to underdogs Tampa Bay Rowdies led by Rodney Marsh in the conference semifinal series 3 games to 1. Pelé still got the league MVP honors and Chinaglia became the league's top goalscorer. Though furious over the early playoff exit, Ross immediately took the team on an exhibition summer tour of Europe with stops to play friendly games in England, France, Belgium, Switzerland, and Italy. Though hugely expensive, the tour generated plenty of publicity for Warner Communications.

The 1977 NASL season—Pelé's final season before retirement—began at the newly built Giants Stadium in New Jersey as New York Cosmos dropped "New York" from its name to become just the Cosmos. With the new giant home, Ross decided to Americanize the experience of going to a Cosmos game with cheerleaders, halftime show, and mascots. On the field, however, the squad got internationalized even further with a roster that had players from every corner of the world. Attendance rose slightly to just over 20,000 in the first five games (3 of which Cosmos lost), but still not enough to Ross' liking. In search of more people in the seats, Ross decided to raise the bar again. He reached for the checkbook midway through the season and looked oversees for more big stars, signing 31-year-old German superstar Franz Beckenbauer from Bayern Munich in May 1977. The German's debut was a 4–2 loss away at Tampa while the following week Cosmos beat Toronto at home in front of 31,000 fans. Ross was happy with the attendance increase, but wanted even more and to that end enlisted celebrities that did business with Warner Communications to make publicized appearances at Cosmos home games. People like Barbra Streisand, Mick Jagger, Phil Collins, Robert Redford, Muhammad Ali, Quincy Jones, Andy Warhol, Henry Kissinger, Steven Spielberg, etc. became a regular sight in the Cosmos locker room and in the luxury boxes at the Giants Stadium. Other changes were in order too as general manager Toye and head coach Bradley got fired and Tampa Bay's Eddie Firmani became the new coach. The team's striker Chinaglia was said to be the driving influence on Ross to hire Chinaglia's good friend Firmani as Chinaglia and Ross developed a personal relationship. Chinaglia thrived under Firmani, scoring goals one after another. The team's play as well as the attendance also started to pick up – led by Pele's hat-trick, the Cosmos finally managed to avenge the losses to Tampa Bay by beating them at home in front 62,394 fans. However, this was followed by another inexplicable dip in form with five losses in seven games. Ross reacted immediately, throwing more big money into the squad, signing Brazil national team's former inspirational captain defender Carlos Alberto who was about to turn 33 years of age. He joined the squad with only four games remaining in the 1977 regular season. By this time, the attendance was rising sharply as the team as well as the league started to catch major buzz. The summer of 1977 was the franchise's first true foray into big time: on August 14, the Giants Stadium was sold out for the Cosmos first game of the playoffs against Fort Lauderdale Strikers with 77,691 people in the stands. The Cosmos finally won the title defeating Seattle Sounders in the Soccer Bowl during late August as Beckenbauer became league MVP and Pelé retired in style.

=== Heading US bid to host the 1986 FIFA World Cup ===
In November 1982, when Colombia, the originally selected host of the 1986 FIFA World Cup, gave up on organizing the event, for economic reasons, Ross called upon all his soccer connections and campaigned hard to bring the tournament to the US including meeting with FIFA president João Havelange, but in May 1983 FIFA decided on Mexico as the replacement host. The United States eventually hosted the World Cup in 1994.

== Personal life ==
Ross was married three times:

- In 1953, he married Carol Rosenthal, daughter of Edward Rosenthal. They divorced in 1978. They had two children:
  - Toni Ross Salaway. She was married to Jeffrey H. Salaway, who died in 2001. They owned and operated Nick & Toni's restaurant in East Hampton, New York. They had two children, Sara and Noah.
  - Mark Ross, the co-founder with Sir George Martin of music production company, GrandMaster Music. He has one child with his wife Alison Bickford: Morgan Ross (born 1991) and two children with his wife Cynthia: Caroline Ross (born 2002) and Brian Ross (born 2001).
- In 1980, he married Amanda (née Mortimer) Burden, the daughter of Barbara (née Cushing) Mortimer (who later married CBS chairman, William S. Paley). They divorced 16 months later.
- In 1982, he married Courtney Sale, daughter of a prosperous Bryan, Texas, family. She dated Ross before his marriage to Amanda Burden and upon their divorce, they rekindled the relationship, eventually marrying. They remained married until his death in 1992. They had a daughter, Nicole.

== Death ==
Ross died on December 20, 1992, at the age of 65, due to complications of prostate cancer, from which he suffered in his final years. Three months later, when Clint Eastwood accepted the Best Picture Oscar for Unforgiven, he dedicated it to Ross's memory. Similarly, the 1993 Steven Spielberg film Schindler's List is also dedicated to Ross.

== Legacy ==
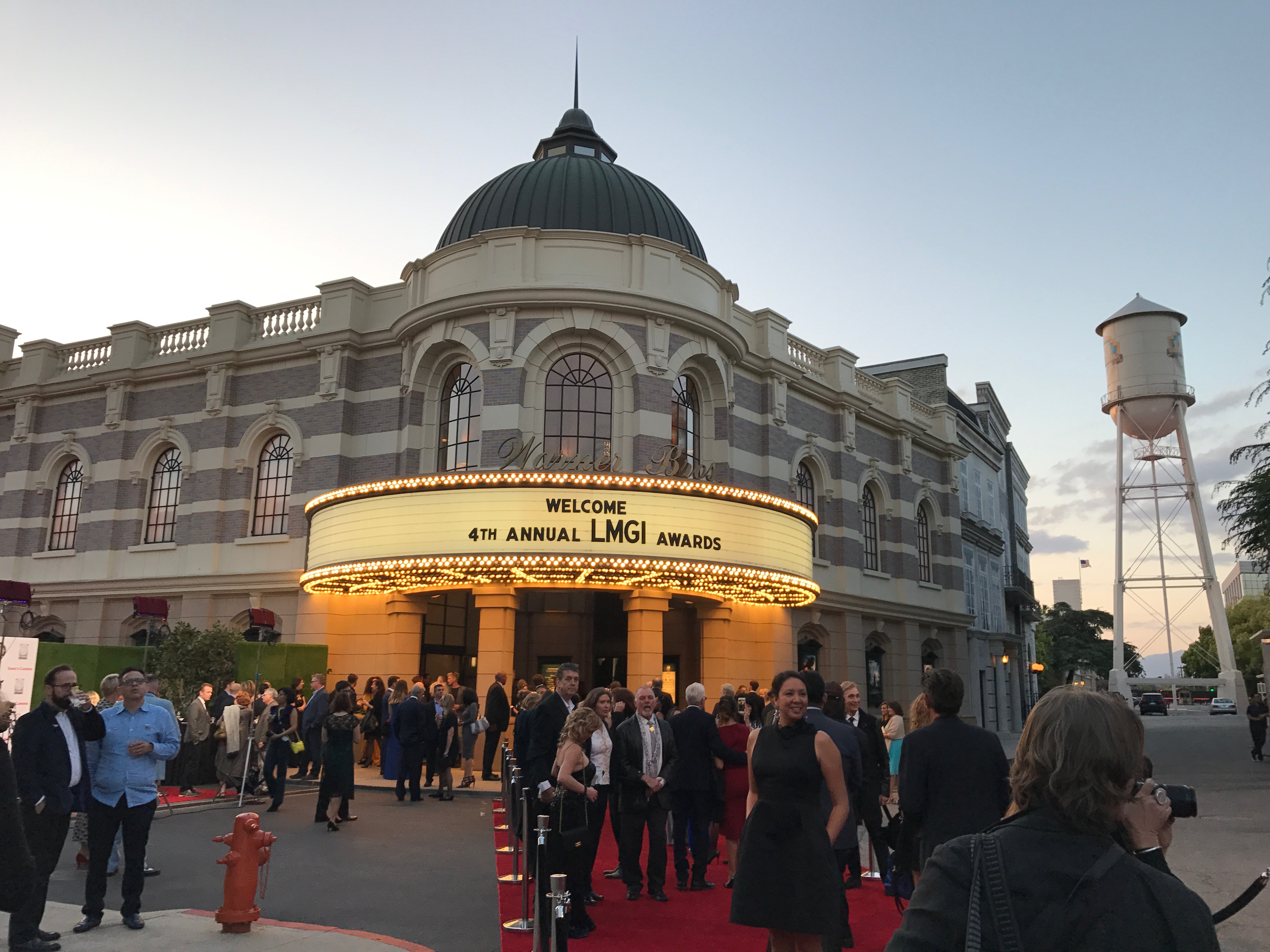
Steven J Ross Theater in 2017 (Warner Bros. Water Tower is visible on the right)

Warner Bros. Studios has named its theater on the backlot of its historic Burbank studio property in honor of their longtime boss, and the UJA-Federation's Entertainment, Media & Communication Division has recognized Ross' commitment to philanthropy by naming the humanitarian award at its annual Leadership Award Dinner in his honor.

== Awards and honors ==
In 1988, Ross was the recipient of the Golden Plate Award of the American Academy of Achievement.

Business positions
Preceded by Company formed	Time Warner CEO; 1989—1992	Succeeded by Gerald M. Levin
