= Paul Milstein =

American real estate developer and philanthropist (1922–2010)

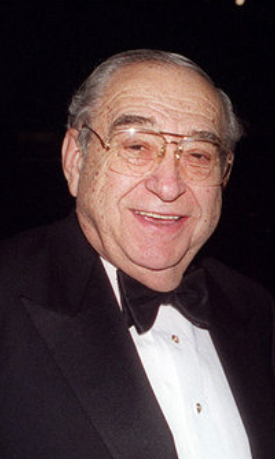
- Born: May 12, 1922; New York City, U.S.
- Died: August 9, 2010 (aged 88); New York City, U.S.
- Burial place: Westchester Hills Cemetery
- Education: New York University
- Occupation: Real estate developer
- Known for: Paul and Irma Milstein Foundation
- Notable work: Milstein Hospital, New York
- Spouse: Irma Cameron
- Children: 4, including Howard Milstein
- Family: Seymour Milstein
- Website: https://paulandirmamilsteinfoundation.org/

Paul Milstein (May 12, 1922 – August 9, 2010) was an American real estate developer and philanthropist.

== Early life ==
Paul Milstein was born to a Jewish family in Manhattan and raised in the Bronx. In 1919, his father Morris Milstein, an immigrant from Zhytomyr, Ukraine (in what was then the Russian Empire), started out as a floor scraper, founded the Circle Floor Company, Inc., a wood flooring company, and later, the Mastic Tile Company, a vinyl flooring company.

Milstein attended DeWitt Clinton High School and New York University for two years before joining the U.S. Army during World War II where he served in the Army Signal Corps in Missouri. After the war, he returned to the family business eventually become president of the wood flooring side of the company while his brother Seymour Milstein was president of the vinyl flooring side of the business. Circle Floor expanded into floor tiles, acoustical ceilings, and drywall construction and won contracts to install flooring in several New York landmarks including Rockefeller Center, the United Nations Building, and both John F Kennedy Airport and LaGuardia Airport. Their company was acquired by Kinney Services Corporation in 1964, with the Milsteins remaining as managers of the unit until 1971 before sale.

Milstein's sister Gloria Milstein Flanzer (May 23, 1927-March 9, 2015) created her own family fortune. Columbia University’s Vagelos College of Physicians and Surgeons announced today that its Division of Cardiology has received a $32.5 million gift from the Louis and Gloria Flanzer Philanthropic Trust of Sarasota, Florida. The gift will fund an endowment that will support the division’s programs in patient care, research, and education.

== Career ==
Milstein launched the family's first real estate development projects in the 1950s in partnership with his brother Seymour. Their companies, Milstein Brothers (MB) Real Estate and Milford Management, managed the organization's residential and commercial space. Paul and his sons, Howard and Edward, invested in large-scale building projects. In 1978, Milstein acquired New York City's Biltmore Hotel, which opened in 1913 following the construction of Grand Central Terminal. The building was converted to office space and reopened as the Bank of America Plaza in 1984. Beginning in 2019, Milstein's grandson, Michael, led another major renovation and modernization of the building, which was renamed 22 Vanderbilt in 2022.

In 1989, the Milstein family acquired Douglas Elliman-Gibbons & Ives residential real estate brokerage.

In 1986, the Milsteins acquired the Emigrant Savings Bank, which became the largest privately owned bank in the country. In 2004, the Milsteins founded the New York Private Bank & Trust which targets high wealth families.

== Philanthropy ==
Paul Milstein and his wife Irma established the Paul and Irma Milstein Foundation in 1994.

== Personal life ==
Paul Milstein was married to Irma Cameron for 63 years. They had four children, Roslyn Milstein Meyer, Howard, Barbara, and Edward.

Paul Milstein died on August 9, 2010, in Manhattan, New York City, and is buried at the Westchester Cemetery.
