= Manny Kimmel =

American businessman (1896–1982)

- Born: April 14, 1896
- Died: July 18, 1982 (aged 84)
- Children: Caesar P. Kimmel

Emmanuel Kimmel (April 14, 1896 – July 18, 1982) was a notable underworld figure between the 1930s and 1960s and the founder of the Kinney Parking Company, a chain of parking lots and garages which evolved into the media conglomerate Warner Communications and ultimately the present day Skydance

According to Connie Bruck, he cooperated with the major racketeer and bootlegger in Newark, Abner Zwillman. According to William Poundstone, Kimmel leased his garages to Zwillman, for storage of liquor during the Prohibition Era. FBI kept tabs on him for his business dealings with known mafia figures, and compelled him to testify in the trials of two of them; Abner Zwillman and Joe Adonis.

An illegal bookmaker in his early years, running the numbers game and other illicit gambling activities in New Jersey, he was perhaps the biggest horseracing bookie in New York at one time, and owned several thoroughbred racehorses himself. He is also known for his early forays into card counting in Blackjack in the early sixties, as he financed Edward O. Thorp's card-counting efforts. He was called "Mr. X" in the 1962 book Beat the Dealer by Thorp, and referenced in The Quants. by Scott Patterson.
