= Kinney Parking Company =

American parking company

Kinney Service Company
- Formerly: Kinney Parking System Inc. (1945–1961)
- Industry: Parking
- Founded: 1945
- Founder: Manny Kimmel
- Defunct: 1961
- Fate: Merged with Riverside Memorial to become a part of Kinney National Company
- Successor: Kinney National Company
- Area served: Newark, New Jersey
- Key people: Steven J. Ross; Caesar Kimmel
- Owners: Manny Kimmel; Sigmund Dornbusch; Abner Zwillman

Kinney System Holding Corporation (founded as Kinney Parking System Inc; shortened to Kinney System Inc.) was a parking company with prominent operations throughout the Northeastern United States. It was established in New Jersey by Manny Kimmel and was managed his son, Caesar Kimmel. After merging with several companies in the 1960s, Kinney became a subsidiary of Kinney Services and later National Kinney. After being spun off in 1986, Kinney System once again became an independent company and was the then-largest publicly held parking company in the United States, being run by Lewis Katz. In the late 1990s, it was acquired by Central Parking Corporation and Kinney as brand was retired by the early 21st Century.

== History ==
Kinney Parking Company was incorporated in 1945 by Manny Kimmel. In 1961, Kinney reached an agreement with Abbey Rent-A-Car (founded by Edward Rosenthal) whereby Abbey customers would park for free at Kinney lots in exchange for a 25% ownership interest in Abbey. The relationship was fruitful and in 1961, Rosenthal and Kimmel decided to merge the two companies with Rosenthal adding two additional companies he owned, Riverside Memorial Chapel and City Service Cleaning Contractors, Inc. The new entity was renamed Kinney Service Corporation and taken public. In 1964, Kinney purchased Walter B. Cooke, Inc., which operated nine funeral homes in New York. By 1964, the company had $29 million in sales and 6,000 cars in its fleet with 100 franchised auto dealers in six states who leased cars under the Kinney brand.

=== Final years, merger with National Cleaning ===
On July 28, 1965, Kinney Service Corporation announced that they would merge with Terminal Maintenance L.I. Inc., a Long Island building-cleaning and maintenance company, however, the merge didn't happen for unknown reasons.

In 1966 the firm merged with the National Cleaning Contractors, Inc. (established by Louis Frankel in 1886 as National Window Cleaning and House Renovating Co). to form Kinney National Company, headed by Steve Ross, who had joined Riverside after marrying Carol Rosenthal, Edward Rosenthal's daughter. Ross pursued an aggressive expansion of media properties, first acquiring National Periodical Publications (publisher of DC Comics), followed by Ashley-Famous talent agency, Panavision, and most notably, Warner Bros.-Seven Arts Ltd., in 1969.

== Legacy ==
=== Kinney Services Corporation ===
Kinney Services was the result of four-way merger between Kinney Parking System, Riverside Memorial Chapel, Inc., Kinney Rent-a-Car, and a cleaning firm. Steve Ross was its CEO and President, and he took the company public in 1962. Kinney Services acquired dozens of service related companies (funeral homes, cleaning businesses, real estate) and eventually expanded into entertainment with the acquisitions of National Periodical Publications (predecessor to DC Comics) and eventually Warner Bros.-Seven Arts. By 1971, Kinney Services was in the process of restructuring and it spun off its most of its non-media assets to National Kinney Corporation.

=== Warner Communications ===
Kinney Services separated majority of its non-media assets to National Kinney Corporation and renamed itself Warner Communications on February 10, 1972. Warner Communications established a cable division that would become the former Time Warner Cable, (now Spectrum) and purchased Atari, but suffered losses with them in the mid 1980s. It merged with Time, Inc in 1990 and formed the Time Warner company (renamed to WarnerMedia by AT&T) that would eventually become the now the present day Warner Bros. Discovery.

=== National Kinney ===
National Kinney expanded from parking and building services into real estate development by purchasing the Uris Buildings Corporation from Harold Uris, but timing was bad as the New York real estate market collapsed in the 1973–75 recession. The main Uris Building asset was soon lost to foreclosure.

In 1979, after some protracted negotiations, National Kinney attempted to purchase The Aladdin hotel and casino in Las Vegas in a joint venture with Johnny Carson, planning to rename it after the star. However, Carson's wife Joanna gossiped about the deal, and subsequent trading in National Kinney stock led to insider trading charges against third parties by the SEC and the disgorgement of profits.

In 1982 National Kinney sold its National States Electric division to an undisclosed buyer, and then agreed to sell its parking subsidiary, Kinney System Inc., to that division's chairman Daniel Katz and a group of investors. In 1985, National Kinney subsequently renamed itself to Andal Corporation and sold its remaining majority interest in Kinney System parking. Andal invested in the declining Steve's Ice Cream and merged in Swensen's before selling them off and unwinding its last operating subsidiary in 1997, becoming a shell corporation with no executives or active businesses.
