= Emigrant Bank =

Privately held American bank

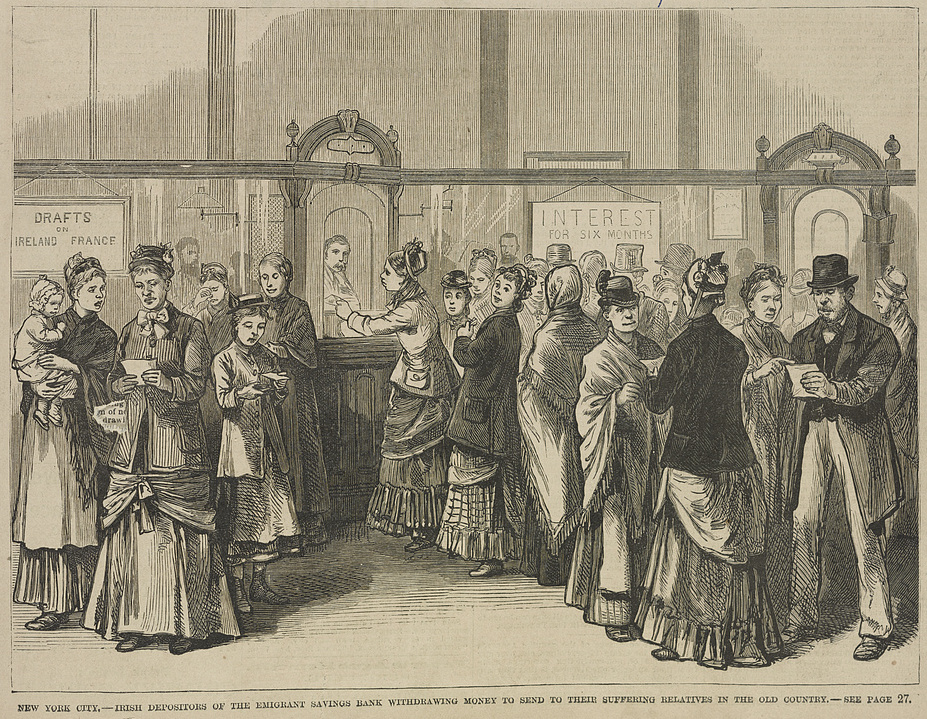
An 1880 illustration of Irish depositors at Emigrant Savings Bank withdrawing money to send to their suffering relatives in Ireland

Emigrant Bank (formerly Emigrant Savings Bank) is a privately held American bank founded in New York City in 1850. In 2012, American Banker ranked it ninth among the largest privately owned banks in the United States, with assets of approximately $8.1 billion. The bank reported total assets of $6.20 billion as of December 31, 2024. Its internet banking services include EmigrantDirect, DollarSavingsDirect, and MySavingsDirect.

== History ==
Emigrant Savings Bank was founded in 1850 by 18 members of the Irish Emigrant Society. It was organized with the support of John Hughes, then the Roman Catholic bishop of New York, and was intended to protect the savings of newly arrived immigrants, particularly Irish immigrants.

The bank opened in leased premises at 51 Chambers Street in October 1850. It erected a building at that address in 1858 and purchased the adjoining property at 49 Chambers Street in 1882. An eight-story bank building was constructed there between 1885 and 1887. The later building occupying 49–51 Chambers Street was designed by Raymond F. Almirall and constructed between 1909 and 1912.

The New York Public Library holds Emigrant Savings Bank records dating from 1841 to 1945. The collection contains detailed information about depositors and borrowers, including addresses, occupations, family relationships, places of origin, and immigration details. Although the records principally document Irish immigrants, they also contain information concerning members of other immigrant communities.

At the end of 1986, Emigrant converted from a mutual savings bank to a stock savings bank. Real-estate developers Seymour and Paul Milstein acquired the newly issued stock and agreed to provide the bank with $90 million in additional capital.

In September 2003, Emigrant Capital made an equity investment in the Boylan Bottling Company. Emigrant Capital executive-in-residence Val Stalowir subsequently joined Boylan's board of directors.

In April 2013, Emigrant completed the sale of 29 retail branches in New York to Apple Bank for Savings.

In 2016, following a six-week trial, a federal jury found that Emigrant's STAR NINA mortgage-lending program discriminated on the basis of race. The loans allowed an 18-percent default interest rate to be imposed after a missed payment. The first jury awarded $950,000 in compensatory damages. Following further proceedings, a second jury awarded $722,044 in compensatory damages and nominal damages; the United States Court of Appeals for the Second Circuit affirmed the judgment in February 2025.

The bank's 2024 annual report identified Howard P. Milstein as co-chairman, co-president, and co-chief executive officer. It also stated that Michael Milstein was appointed co-chief executive officer in 2024.

== Gallery ==
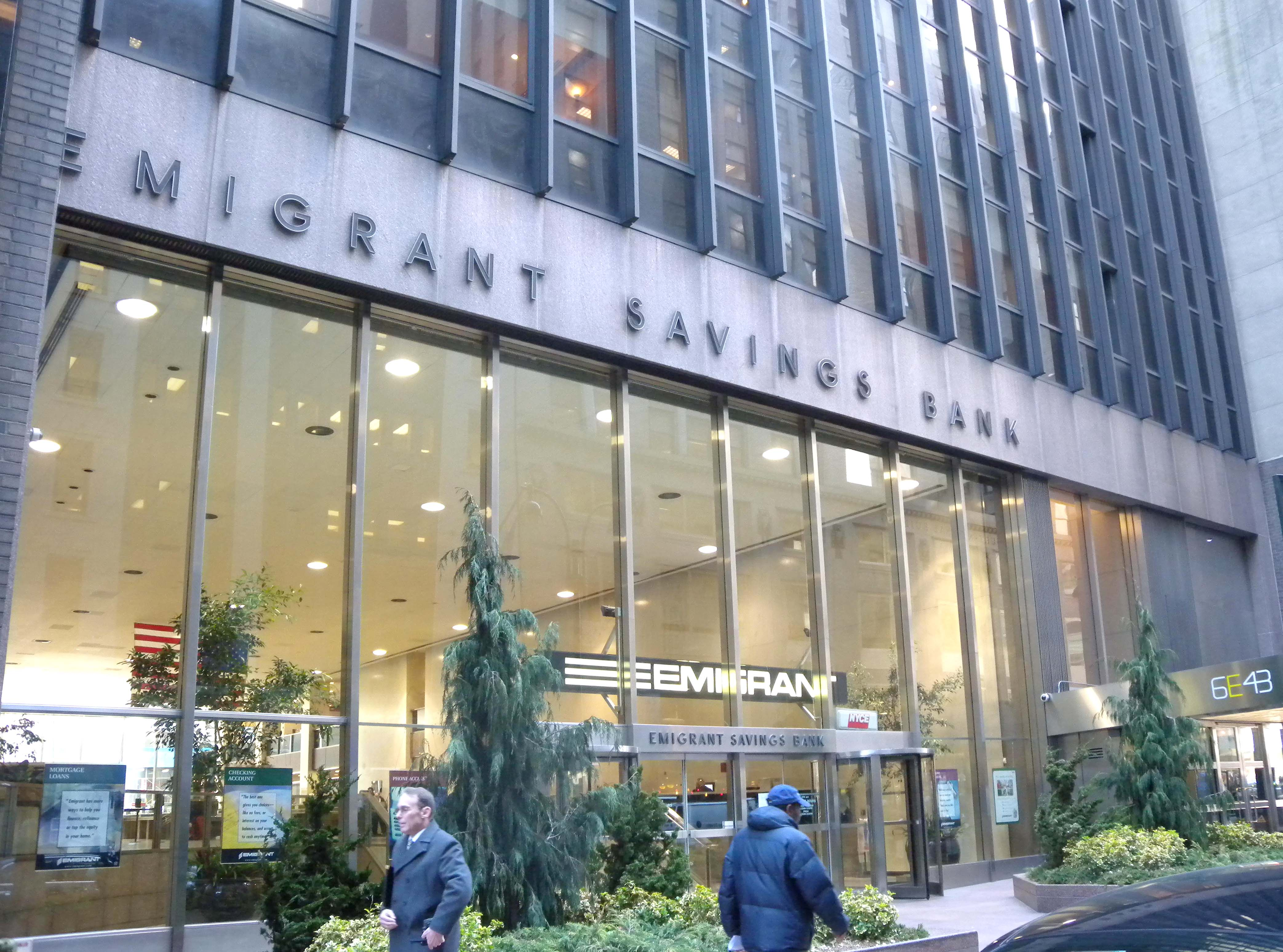

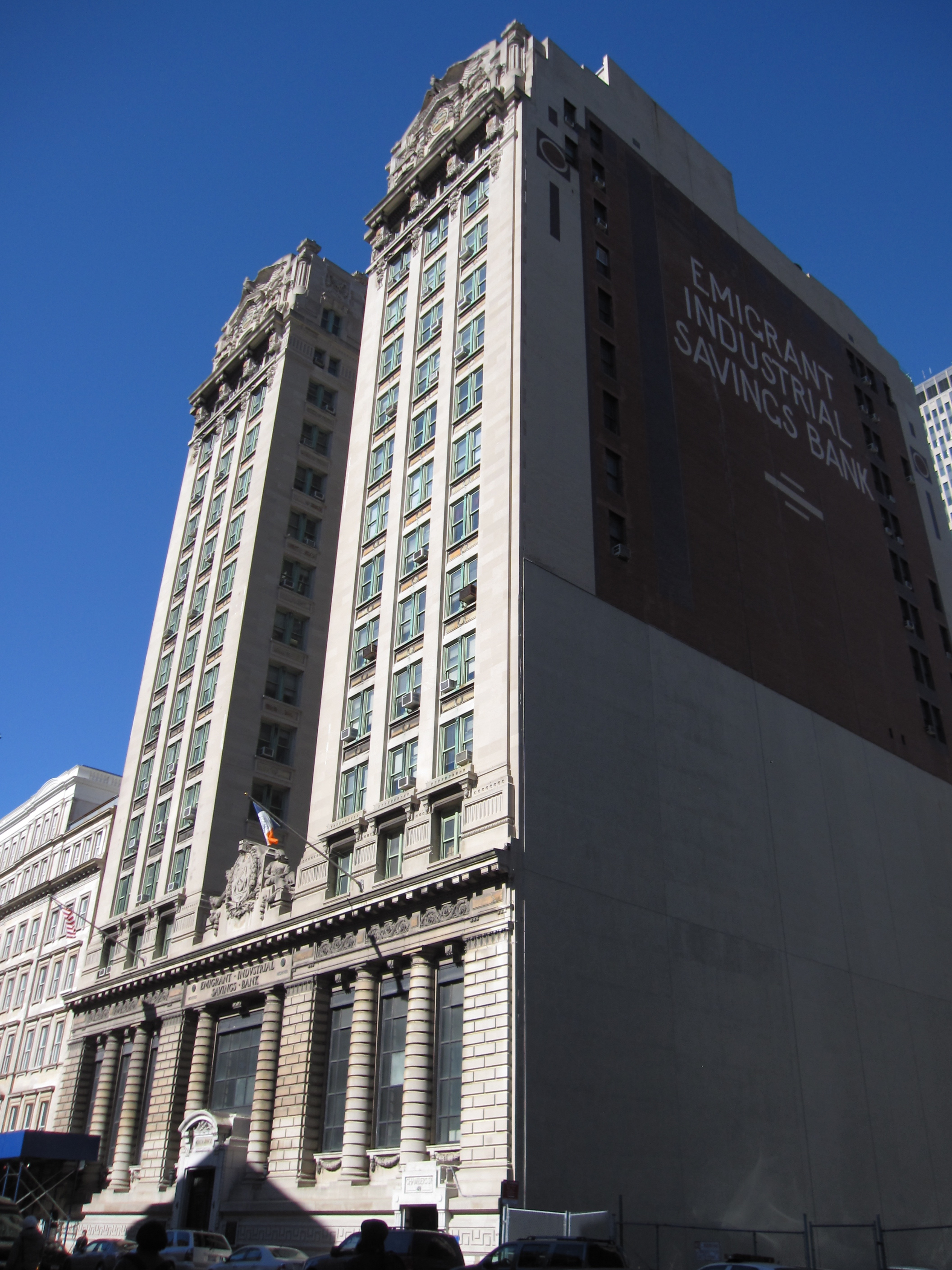

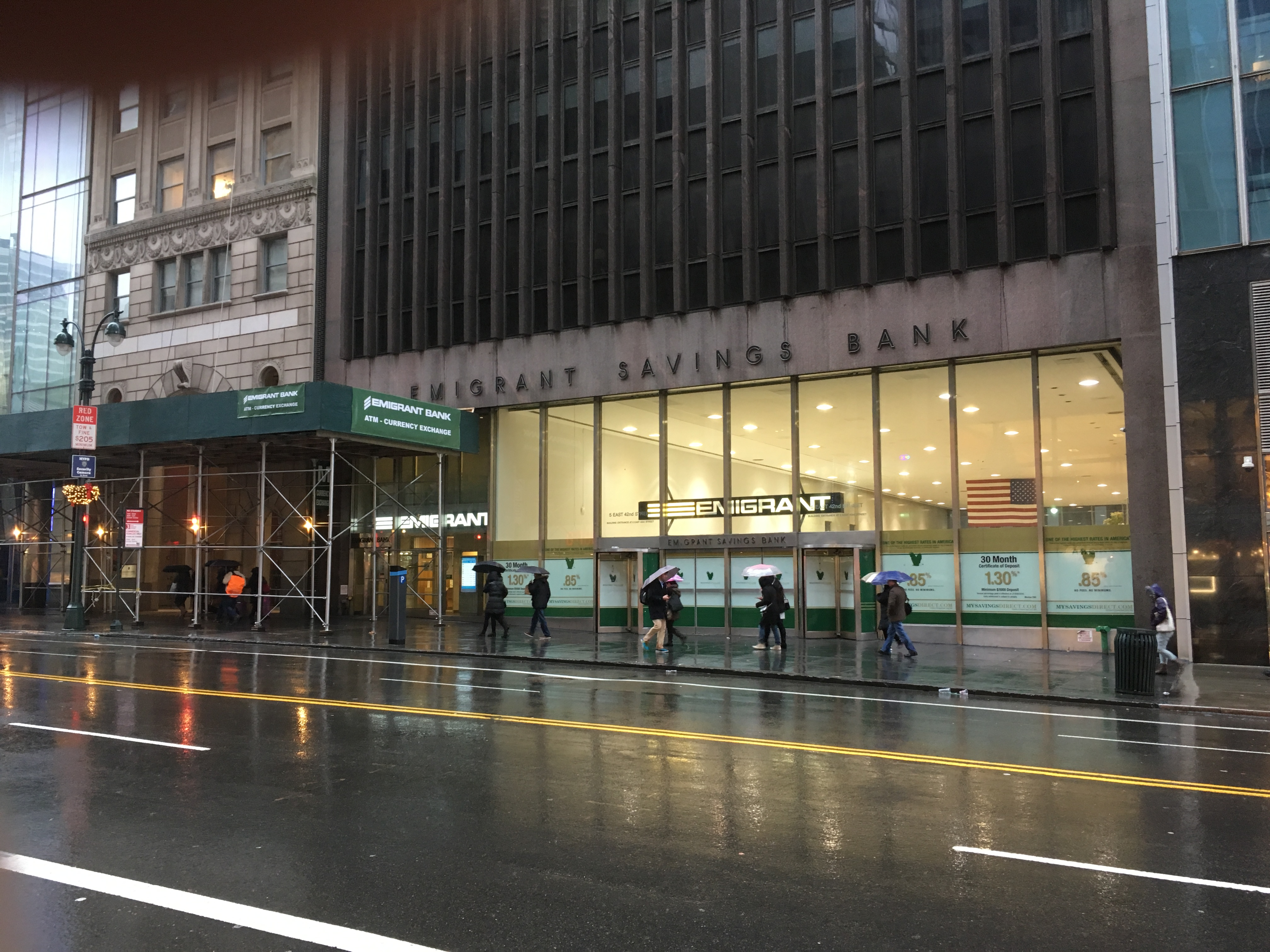
