= Martin Baum (agent) =

American talent agent and film producer (1924–2010)

- Born: 2 March 1924; New York City, New York, U.S.
- Died: 5 November 2010 (aged 86); Beverly Hills, California, U.S.
- Occupations: Talent agent, film producer

Martin Baum (March 2, 1924 – November 5, 2010) was an American talent agent and film producer, known for his work at the Creative Artists Agency (CAA), including the first head of the agency's motion picture department.

During his career, which spanned from the 1940s until 2010, his client list at CAA and other agencies included Bette Davis, Jack Lemmon, Bobby Darin, Bo Derek, Richard Attenborough, Red Buttons, Maggie Smith, and Rock Hudson. Baum was also the President of ABC Pictures, the film division of the American Broadcasting Company (ABC), from 1968 until 1971.

== Early life ==
Baum, a native of New York City, was born on March 2, 1924. He enlisted in the U.S. Army during World War II while still in high school, taking part in the Allied Normandy landings in France. He initially worked as a stage manager following the war, and decided to become a talent agent after a series of failed stage productions.

== Career ==
Baum and Abe Newborn co-founded their own talent agency, Baum-Newborn Agency, in 1948, which proved profitable. They later sold the firm to General Artists Corporation (GAC). Baum moved to Los Angeles in 1960 when he became the head of GAC's motion picture talent division. Baum then joined the Ashley-Famous Agency after leaving GAC.

He then formed his own agency, the Martin Baum Agency, which later merged with the Creative Artists Agency (CAA).

In the interim, Baum became the head of ABC Pictures in 1968, the film division of American Broadcasting Company (ABC). As President, Baum oversaw the production of a number of films, including They Shoot Horses, Don't They? (1969), Straw Dogs (1971) and Cabaret (1972). His client Gig Young won the Academy Award for Best Supporting Actor for his role in They Shoot Horses, Don't They? Young later bequeathed Baum his Oscar statuette following his suicide in 1978.

Throughout his career Baum earned the reputation as a "packager", according to the Los Angeles Times. Baum brought together various clients whom he represented, such as actors, screenwriters and film directors, and then "package" them together in a proposal to a film studio or production company. Baum proved instrumental in packaging together three of his clients, James Poe, actor Sidney Poitier and director Ralph Nelson to create the 1963 film Lilies of the Field. Poitier won the Academy Award for Best Actor for the film, becoming the first African American actor to win the award.

In 1960, Baum partnered with Baum & Newborn Theatrical Agency to begin producing films and television in addition to his work as a publicist. He became a production executive at both Optimus Productions and Creative Management Association. Baum's credits as a producer included The Last Valley, Bring Me the Head of Alfredo Garcia, The Wilby Conspiracy and The Killer Elite, all of which were released in the 1970s.

In 1976, the five founding partners of Creative Artists Agency (CAA) – Michael S. Rosenfeld, Michael Ovitz, Ron Meyer, William Haber and Rowland Perkins – proposed that Martin Baum join CAA. The five agents had formed CAA in 1975 after they departed the William Morris Agency (WMA). Baum accepted the offer, completing the merger of his Martin Baum Agency with CAA on October 11, 1976. Baum brought an extensive client list to the CAA when he joined the agency, including Peter Sellers and Sidney Poitier. More importantly to CAA founders, the merger with Baum's agency added legitimacy to CAA, which had only been founded one year prior to their overture to Baum. Baum became the first head of CAA's motion picture division. He remained a fixture at CAA until shortly before his death in 2010.

Baum accumulated an extensive client list throughout his career. In addition to Sidney Poitier and Gig Young, his clients included Carroll O'Connor, Dyan Cannon, Gene Wilder, Julie Andrews, Richard Harris, Richard Attenborough, Maggie Smith, Harry Belafonte, Stockard Channing, Joanne Woodward, John Cassavetes, Jack Lemmon, Blake Edwards, Bette Davis, Gena Rowlands, Rod Steiger, Cliff Robertson and Red Buttons at various times throughout his career.

== Death ==
Martin Baum died at his home in Beverly Hills, California on November 5, 2010, at the age of 86. He was survived by his daughter, Fern; son, Rich; three grandchildren; and his girlfriend of twelve years, Vicki Sanchez. His wife, Bernice Baum, died in 1997.

== Filmography ==
Year	Title	Functioned as		Director
Year	Title	Producer	Exec. Producer	Director
1971	The Last Valley	No	Yes	James Clavell
1972	Cabaret	No	Yes	Bob Fosse
1974	Bring Me the Head of Alfredo Garcia	Yes	No	Sam Peckinpah
1975	The Wilby Conspiracy	Yes	No	Ralph Nelson
1975	The Killer Elite	Yes	No	Sam Peckinpah
