= Insight Labs =

Pro bono strategy development platform

- Insight Labs logo
- Founded: 2009
- Founders: Jeff Leitner, Howell J. Malham, Jr.
- Type: Pro bono strategy development
- Purpose: Social change, innovation, governments, nonprofits, NGOs
- Location: 1 N. LaSalle Street, Suite 2700, Chicago, IL 60602
- Origins: Leitner Public Affairs, Chicago Wonk, think tanks, flash mobs
- Region served: Earth
- Services: Strategic planning
- Method: Conferences and strategy sessions, hybridized as "Labs"
- Key people: Dean: Jeff Leitner; Dir: Howell J. Malham, Jr. Dir: Andrew Benedict-Nelson; Res: Dave Silverstone
- Website: www.theinsightlabs.org

The Insight Labs is a pro bono strategy development platform for non-profit organizations, non-governmental organizations and government agencies.

== Methodology and format ==
An Insight Lab is a structured, three-hour strategy session for a non-profit organization, government agency or industry. Participants are corporate leaders from varied industries, representatives from the benefiting entities, "wildcard" participants (such as professional writers, artists, or scientists), and The Insight Labs staff who moderate the discussion.

The Insight Labs staff choose participants from the creative, corporate and academic world for their strategic and creative thinking. These individuals are able to lend these skills to the issue addressed at the Lab without concern for the current limitations of the partner organization. The Insight Lab Founder and Dean Jeff Leitner argues that including intelligent individuals who are not impacted directly by the outcome of the session allows for more creative solutions.

== Background ==
The prototype for Insight Labs was developed in summer 2006. In spring 2008, the format was refocused on philanthropic efforts. Jeff Leitner and co-founder and director, Howell J. Malham Jr., developed the current format in spring 2009.

Jeff Leitner is founder and dean of Insight Labs. He holds degrees in Government from University of Texas and in Journalism from Ohio State University, and prior to co-founding Insight Labs worked as a reporter, a political campaign strategist, and public affairs strategist.

Howell J. Malham Jr. is co-founder and director of publishing and media for Insight Labs. He was a founding partner of the new media agency DIGITAAL and has written for The New York Times, Los Angeles Times and Chicago Tribune. He holds a degree from Arizona State University. He is the author of a book, I Have a Strategy (No, You Don't), published 5 February 2013 by Jossey-Bass publishers.

As of February 2013, over 45 strategy sessions or conferences have occurred, including more than 500 participants.

== Chronology ==
=== 2013 ===
Lab partners in 2013 included Echoing Green, The Alfred P. Sloan Foundation, Community of Democracies with the US State Department, The Creative Coalition, Akerman Senterfitt, Akina, Freeborn & Peters, Hellerman Baretz Communications, Levenfeld Pearlstein, and One North Interactive.

=== 2012 ===
2012 saw Insight Labs partner with Boeing Global Corporate Citizenship, the Illinois Humanities Council, the CAA Foundation, Starbucks, Ashoka, Our Time, Social Capital Markets, The Family Van, and its sponsor, Harvard Medical School, Medical Intelligence, Foundations of East Chicago, and, for a second time, the West Collection.

=== 2011 ===
In 2011 a total of 16 labs were conducted, with partners the Chicagoland Chamber of Commerce Foundation, the Silk Road Theatre Project, World Sport Chicago, the League of Chicago Theatres, the Illinois Chamber of Commerce, Genesis at the Crossroads, Jewish Child & Family Services, Union League Boys & Girls Clubs, the School of Visual Arts, Cannon Design, Akina, the US Holocaust Memorial Museum, Generation Generosity, the West Collection, National Aeronautics and Space Administration, and the University of Illinois Academy for Entrepreneurial Leadership.

=== 2010 ===
2010 saw the labs partner with the Children’s Memorial Hospital, Chicago Public Media, the American Parkinson Disease Association's Young Onset Center, the YWCA of Metropolitan Chicago, 826 Chicago, the Chicago Sinfonietta, the Professional Convention Management Association, midVentures, the North South Foundation, the Illinois Student Assistance Commission, and the Illinois Commerce Commission

=== 2009 ===
In 2009, the Labs conducted their first two sessions in their current format, the first with One D, a confederation of Detroit non-profits, to address the gap between local jobs programs and corporate HR interests. Among the conclusions were ""Detroit has a rich, exploitable asset: thousands of men and women who grew up in Detroit and might very well return. Proof: HR professionals say their best odds of hiring out-of-towners come when they report Detroit expatriates." The second lab of the year was held in partnership with Executive Breakfast Club, with a goal of developing ideas to make the topic of business ethics affirmative and appealing, rather than a focus on "what not to do".

== Notable participants ==
Past participants include:

Carol Coletta, Manuel Flores, Amy Krouse Rosenthal, Bill Moggridge, Amy Wilson. Ryan Blitstein, Susan Crown, Alison Cuddy, Lee Fisher, Ryan Frietas, the co-founder of about.me, Carlo Lorenzo Garcia, Cheryl Heller, Anya Kamenetz, Steven Kaplan, Raghava KK, Amanda Lannert of Jellyvision, PJ Loughran, Eric Lunt, co-founder of Feedburner, Stephanie Pace Marshall, Bruce Mau, Toby Moffett, Maria Popova, Ryan Spencer Reed, Dan Rothenberg of the Pig Iron Theatre Company, Lincoln Schatz, Matthew Segal, Yosi Sergant, Michael Slaby, deputy director and CTO of New Media in the 2008 Obama Presidential Campaign, Gary Slutkin, Jacob Soboroff, Emerson Spartz, Millions of Us CEO Reuben Steiger, Eric Weinstein, Marco Werman, Illinois Chamber of Commerce President & CEO Doug Whitley, Amy Wilson, and OkCupid co-founder Sam Yagan.

== External projects ==
Some labs have resulted in the creation of outside projects to pursue and implement ideas developed in the labs.

=== The New Architect ===
In 2010, The Insight Labs collaborated with Manifest Digital to create The New Architect, an ongoing web series following a free-flowing, talk show format that focuses on topics related to human interaction in the digital age.

=== UX for Good ===
In 2011, The Insight Labs was a founding partner of the first UX for Good event, a two-day design competition where user experience and visual designers, along with writers, visual artists, and non-profit organizations, were teamed up to develop solutions for systemic social issues such as unemployment, urban violence, and public education.

=== Narrative Renewal ===
Following the 2012 lab with Foundations of East Chicago, The Narrative Renewal Project was launched, to gather the inspiring stories specific to a challenged community (starting with a pilot project in East Chicago, Indiana), to put those stories to work, producing tangible improvements in quality of life.

== Criticism ==
The Insight Labs has been criticized for not producing actionable insights.
