= Rowland Perkins =

American talent agent

- Born: John Henry Rowland Perkins II; July 10, 1934; Los Angeles, California, U.S.
- Died: August 8, 2018 (aged 84); Sherman Oaks, California, U.S.
- Education: Beverly Hills High School
- Alma mater: University of California, Los Angeles
- Occupation: Talent agent
- Spouse: Sallie James Perkins (1932-2017) (her death)
- Children: 3

Rowland Perkins (July 10, 1934 – August 8, 2018) was an American talent agent. He was a co-founder and the founding president of the Creative Artists Agency (CAA).

== Early life ==
Rowland Perkins was born on July 10, 1934, in Los Angeles, California. He graduated from Beverly Hills High School. He served in the United States Navy for two years and attended the University of California in Los Angeles, where he earned a bachelor's degree in business administration.

== Career ==
Perkins began his career at the William Morris Agency (WMA).

Perkins co-founded Creative Artists Agency with Michael Ovitz, Ronald Meyer, William Haber and Michael S. Rosenfeld in 1975. He was its founding president. Perkins negotiated television productions for George Stevens Jr. He retired from CAA in 1993.

In 1995, Perkins founded the production company Double Eagle Entertainment. He served on the board of the Academy of Television Arts & Sciences.

== Personal life and death ==
In 1960, Perkins married Diane Carol Smith whom he had met while they both attended UCLA. They had three daughters, Kamala, Dahra and Alexandra. They divorced in 1976. Perkins later married Sallie James Perkins, an actress, comedian and opera singer. His wife Sallie predeceased him in 2017.

He died of pneumonia on August 8, 2018, in Sherman Oaks, California, at age 84.
