= Jay Moloney =

American Hollywood talent agent (1964–1999)

- Born: James David Moloney; November 14, 1964; Malibu, California, U.S.
- Died: November 16, 1999 (aged 35); Los Angeles, California, U.S.
- Education: University of Southern California
- Occupation: Talent agent
- Employer: Creative Artists Agency

James David "Jay" Moloney (November 14, 1964 – November 16, 1999) was an American Hollywood talent agent. Moloney was a top Creative Artists Agency (CAA) agent and a protégé of CAA founder Michael Ovitz. He died by suicide at age 35.

== Early life and education ==
Moloney grew up in Southern California, but moved to Newport, Oregon with his mother at age 14. His father, Jim Moloney, was a Hollywood screenwriter who died in 1994. He was of Irish and Jewish descent.

== Career ==
Moloney joined Creative Artists Agency (CAA) as an intern in June 1983 while attending USC. He later dropped out of college at the age of 20. He quickly became a protege of Michael Ovitz, the founder of CAA. By the age of 21, Moloney was part of CAA's "Young Turks", along with David O'Connor, Kevin Huvane, Richard Lovett and Bryan Lourd, who as a group would go on to lead CAA after Ovitz's departure. At the peak of his career, he handled Hollywood stars including Steven Spielberg, Martin Scorsese, David Letterman, Uma Thurman, and Leonardo DiCaprio.

After Ovitz left CAA for Disney, Moloney was named managing director. Due to an addiction to cocaine that started in 1995, Moloney was unable to perform on the job and was later forced out of CAA. His career fall was documented in the media. In 1999, he joined Paradise Music & Entertainment, but his contract was terminated due to his frequent absences.

== Personal life ==
He chose to have open-heart surgery which he was aware he would eventually need to correct a congenital defect, but opted to have it done early believing that during recovery from surgery he would never opt to use cocaine. A “friend” who will remain anonymous brought him a gift basket containing two cartons of Marlboro Reds and a half gallon of Jack Daniels. The staff and doctors did not remove the care package and it was the first thing Jay saw when he woke up following surgery.

Moloney was a rising star inside CAA even at a young age and became the protégé of Michael Ovitz, the founder of CAA. His drug and alcohol problem got worse during this time, which was shortly after the death of his alcoholic father, from whom he had been estranged.

Moloney dated several actresses including Jennifer Grey, Sherilyn Fenn, and Gina Gershon. Moloney was described by many as handsome, charming, and affable.

== Death and legacy ==
He died by suicide by hanging himself two days after he turned 35 on November 16, 1999. He was found in his shower by Ben Taylor, a friend who had been staying in his guest house.

Danny Huston played a character inspired by Moloney in Bernard Rose's film Ivans Xtc.

Shortly after his death, his mother Carole Johnson was diagnosed with cancer; nine months after her son’s death she was buried in the same resting place as Jay at Hollywood Forever Cemetery. Jay is survived by his two brothers from his father's first marriage, Sean Moloney and Darren Moloney who both reside in Los Angeles.
