= Dana Giacchetto =

American fraudster and money manager (1962–2014)

- Giacchetto in 2014
- Born: Dana C. Giacchetto; October 15, 1962; Medford, Massachusetts
- Died: June 12, 2016 (aged 53); Manhattan, New York City, New York
- Children: 2
- Status: 2000: Released in 2003
- Convictions: 2000: Pleaded guilty in August 2000
- Criminal charge: Fraud
- Penalty: 2000: 57 months imprisonment 2014: 2 years of probation

Dana C. Giacchetto (October 15, 1962 – June 12, 2016) was an American stockbroker and financial criminal. Nicknamed the "Stockbroker to the Stars", he was the money manager for various celebrities including Leonardo DiCaprio, Ben Affleck and Matt Damon, and was known for his lavish parties in his loft in SoHo, which DiCaprio and other celebrities stayed in.

He was arrested in 2000 for defrauding his clients of $9.8 million and was sentenced to 57 months in prison, later being charged for fraud again in 2014. Giacchetto served a 57-month prison sentence, being released early in 2003. Following his 2014 arrest, he was placed on two years' probation. He died at his apartment in 2016 following an overdose a week prior.

== Early life and career ==
Giacchetto was born on October 15, 1962, in Medford, Massachusetts to Cosmo J. and Alma Rapallo Giacchetto. Giacchetto completed his high school education at Medford High School in 1980. He then attended the University of Massachusetts Boston, where he studied English and economics, graduating in 1990. While in college, he was part the new wave band Breakfast in Bed and aspired to be a rock keyboard player and vocalist. In 1995, he moved to New York.

In 1987, he started the Cassandra Group using a $200,000 loan from his mother and being headquartered in the 561 Broadway Singer Building. The company's core mission revolved around investing in blue-chip stocks and corporate bonds, with a conservative approach that prioritized low-risk securities. He was able to meet talent agent Jay Moloney, and through him, was introduced to people such as Michael Ovitz and Leonardo DiCaprio. At the company's peak, it had $400 million in assets with clients such as Tim Roth, Cameron Diaz, and Tobey Maguire. During this time, he was friends with people like Ovitz, Alanis Morissette, and Michael Stipe, with some inviting him to vacations. By 1999 however, Giacchetto's agents began withdrawing their funds from his management due to his lifestyle.

== Legal issues ==
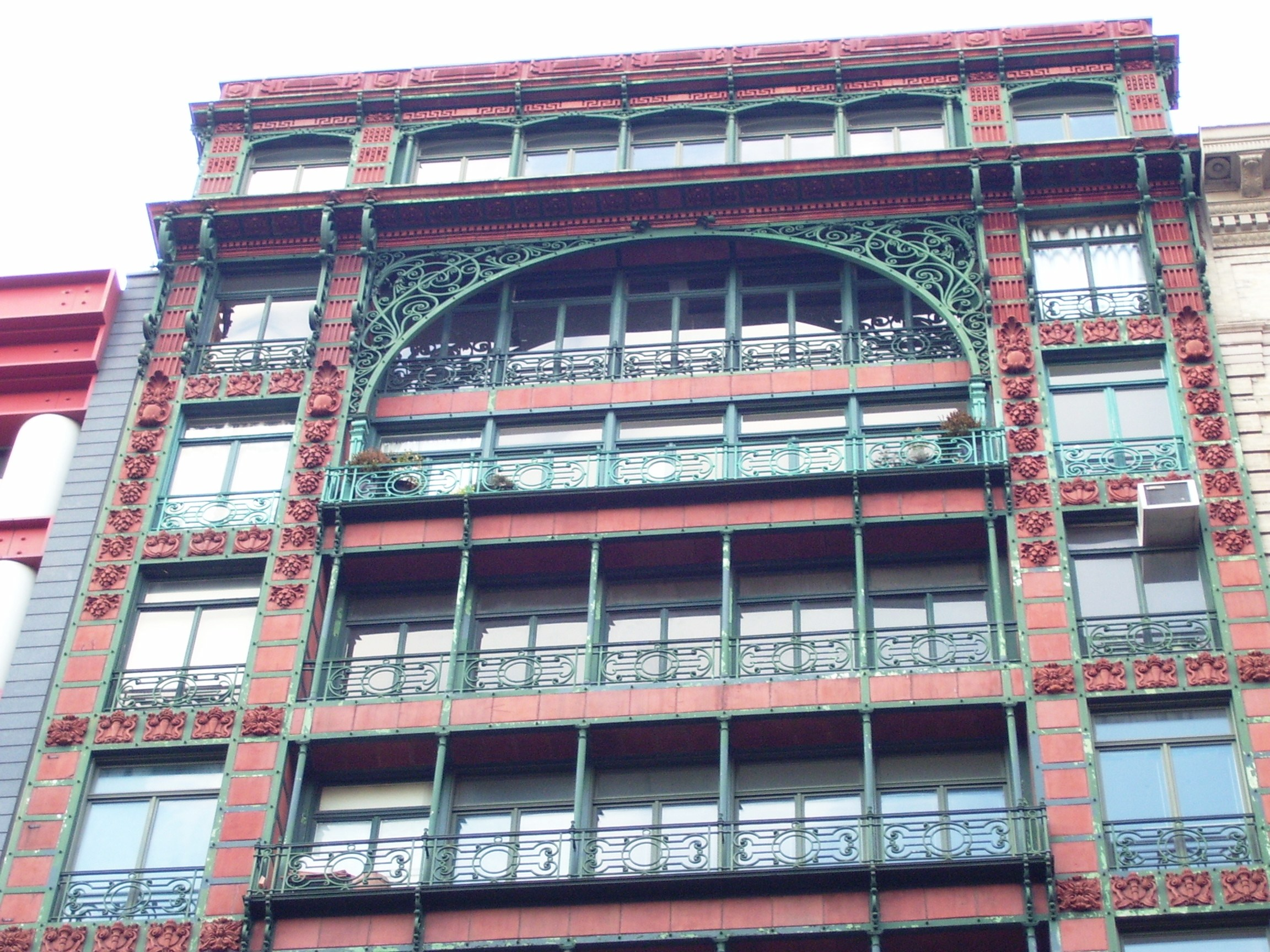
Giacchetto loft and offices were located in the 561 Broadway Singer Building.

In April 2000, Giacchetto was arrested and charged of fraud and lying to the U.S. Securities and Exchange Commission, alleging that he misappropriated funds belonging to his clients, which he managed through the Cassandra Group. Giacchetto's parents mortgaged their home to secure his bail. Weeks after he was released, he was arrested again after getting off a flight from Las Vegas to Newark, New Jersey with a doctored passport, $4,000 in cash, and dozens of first-class tickets on hand. In August 2000, Giacchetto pleaded guilty to the charges, admitting to embezzling an estimated $5 million to $10 million from the accounts under his management. He received the maximum sentence of 57 months in prison for his crimes. Giacchetto was released early from prison in February 2003 and permitted to work in a regular job. However, the Securities and Exchange Commission permanently banned him from working in the investment business.

In February 2014, Giacchetto was charged with wire and access device fraud, with the complaint alleging that he made multiple purchases with another person's credit card. American Express had notified the cardholder of a fraudulent charge, where it was later discovered the Giacchetto had made multiple purchases using their card. He surrendered on February 20 and faced 25 years in prison. Giacchetto received a sentence of two years' probation, which included four months of home confinement.

== Personal life ==
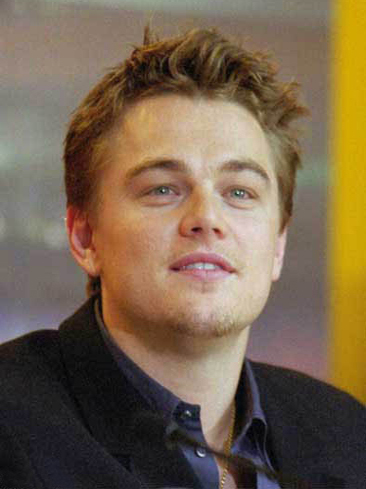
Leonardo DiCaprio (pictured in 2000) stayed in Giacchetto's loft in the late 1990s.

Giacchetto's girlfriend was Allegra Brosco, whom he had met years earlier and hired for a job. They became engaged while Giacchetto was imprisoned, deciding to hold off a wedding at the advice of their parents. Giacchetto's younger brother, Russell Giacchetto, was arrested in 2015 for assault and battery and was a suspect in a 2018 stabbing in East Cambridge, Massachusetts.

Prior to his first arrest, he lived in a loft in SoHo, Manhattan above the offices of the Cassandra Group in the Singer Building. Many celebrities stayed in the lofts, including Leonardo DiCaprio, who from 1998 to 1999 stayed in his loft for months at a time. He owned a cockatoo named Angel, which resided in the loft alongside DiCaprio's cockatoo named Tiberius. His loft in SoHo was vacated in after his indictment, with his possessions being stored and sold to others. Afterwards, he lived in an apartment on the Upper East Side with a roommate.

On June 12, 2016, Giacchetto died in his apartment following a weekend partying, which included attending a premiere party for the movie Legends of Freestyle. Brosco became worried about Giacchetto after being unable to reach him, prompting her to contact his friends. The following day, Giacchetto's roommate discovered his body in bed, facing upwards, with foam at the mouth. Just a week before his passing, paramedics revived Giacchetto from an overdose after administering an adrenaline shot. Following his death, Giacchetto's body was taken to a morgue at Hart Island, where it remained unclaimed. His mother was unable to get $7,000 to claim it, making it difficult for her to arrange a proper burial for him.
