= Kimberly Ovitz =

American fashion designer (born 1983)

- Born: Kimberly Sarah Ovitz; July 10, 1983 (age 43); Los Angeles, California, U.S.
- Occupation: Fashion designer
- Parent(s): Michael Ovitz; Judy Reich Ovitz
- Website: kimberlyovitz.com

Kimberly Ovitz (born July 10, 1983) is an American fashion designer and founder/creative director of an eponymous fashion line.

== Early life and education ==
Born and raised in Los Angeles, California, Ovitz demonstrated an early interest in fashion design and horseback riding. The daughter of Judy (née Reich) and CAA co-founder Michael Ovitz, she grew up surrounded by creative talent and was inspired by modern art and architecture, both of which featured as themes in her later designs.

At 14, she received an internship at J. Crew and throughout her career remained influenced by the editorially sparse minimalism of Emily Scott, J. Crew’s cofounder and former CEO. Ovitz later took internships at Harper’s Bazaar with photographer Herb Ritts, at Chanel in Paris, working under Karl Lagerfeld, and at W magazine. She attended Parsons The New School for Design before earning a B.A. in Art History and Business from Brown University. Following college she worked at labels Imitation of Christ, YaYa and Twelfth Street by Cynthia Vincent.

== Career ==
In 2009 Ovitz launched her Kimberly Ovitz Collection from her design studio in Santa Monica, California. Three years later she relocated the company to its new home in Tribeca, New York City. Her initial line consisted of a neutral palette of ‘grungy’ and ‘equestrian’ pieces, and was critically well received. Her Kimberly Ovitz Jacob long sleeve dress was one of the most worn on the red carpet in 2009. The collection's overall vision grew out of the equestrian concept.

In 2010, Ovitz continued with showings at New York Fashion Week. Her spring collection was held at Mac Milk Studios in New York and was attended by family friend Martin Scorsese. The architectural, asymmetrical draping of her fall 2010 collection solidified her reputation within the fashion world as an up-and-coming, ‘minimalist-meets-modern’ designer.

Ovitz’s collection benefitted from everyday and red carpet wear by trend-setting Hollywood celebrities including Chloë Sevigny and Olivia Wilde. In February 2011, actress Lindsay Lohan wore a Kimberly Ovitz dress to a court appearance in Los Angeles. The $575 "Glavis" dress from Ovitz's pre-fall collection subsequently sold out in boutiques worldwide by the next morning.

In her fall 2011 collection, Ovitz stepped out of her traditionally monochromatic palette with pieces incorporating hints of neon yellow and cobalt blue, inspired by the architecture and spirit of Brazil. Attendance at her New York Fashion Week showing included Jenna Lyons, Prabal Gurung, Neiman Marcus’ Roopal Patel and Bergdorf Goodman’s Linda Fargo. In her spring 2012 collection, Ovitz was inspired by Shigeru Ban, the minimalist architect, specifically the curtainwall house as well as his minimalist ideology of design and focus on working with sustainable materials with little waste. In 2012, Ovitz launched O by Kimberly Ovitz, a lower-priced line made of Tencel – an eco friendly, biodegradable fabric made from wood pulp cellulose. Designs were inspired by best-selling pieces from her regular collection and retailed for under $200.

Feminism and the image of a strong female feature as prominent motifs in her designs. Her fall 2012 line was inspired by Kagemusha, a film by Kurosawa. Ovitz was interested in the samurai warrior, a theme that expanded into a more general warrior. In fall 2013, Ovitz introduced an edgy and futuristic collection inspired by natural defense mechanisms found in animals and nature. Her showing at New York Fashion week was attended by Vogue editor-in-chief Anna Wintour and designers Tory Burch and J. Crew’s Jenna Lyons. The collection included a 3D-printed jewelry line, created in collaboration with Shapeways.

Ovitz announced she would not produce a fall 2013 line, focusing instead on a ‘number of collaborations and initiatives, including a new collection with Shapeways.’

== Personal life ==
Ovitz is the daughter of Hollywood mogul Michael Ovitz and actress Judy (née Reich) Ovitz. Her brother is Chris Ovitz, co-founder of Viddy, WorkPop, and OKPlay.

She is active philanthropically in animal welfare for the American Society for the Prevention of Cruelty to Animals (ASPCA) and the Humane Society of the United States. She co-chaired the 2013 HSUS ‘To the Rescue’ gala with Georgina Bloomberg and Amanda Hearst.
