= Giacchetto =

Giacchetto is a surname of Italian origin. Notable people with the surname include:

- Alberto Giacchetto (born 1973), Italian pole vaulter
- Dana Giacchetto (1962–2016), American stockbroker and financial criminal

== See also ==
- Giachetti
