= Giachetti =

Giachetti is an Italian surname. Notable people with the surname include:

- Fosco Giachetti (1900–1974), Italian actor
- Gianfranco Giachetti (1888–1936), Italian stage and film actor
- Jacopo Giachetti (born 1983), Italian basketball player
- Richard Giachetti, NASCAR race car owner and one half of the Giachetti Brothers
- Richie Giachetti (1940–2016), American boxing trainer
- Roberto Giachetti (born 1961), Italian politician

== See also ==
- Giacchetto
