= Creative Artists Agency =

American talent and sports agency

Creative Artists Agency, LLC

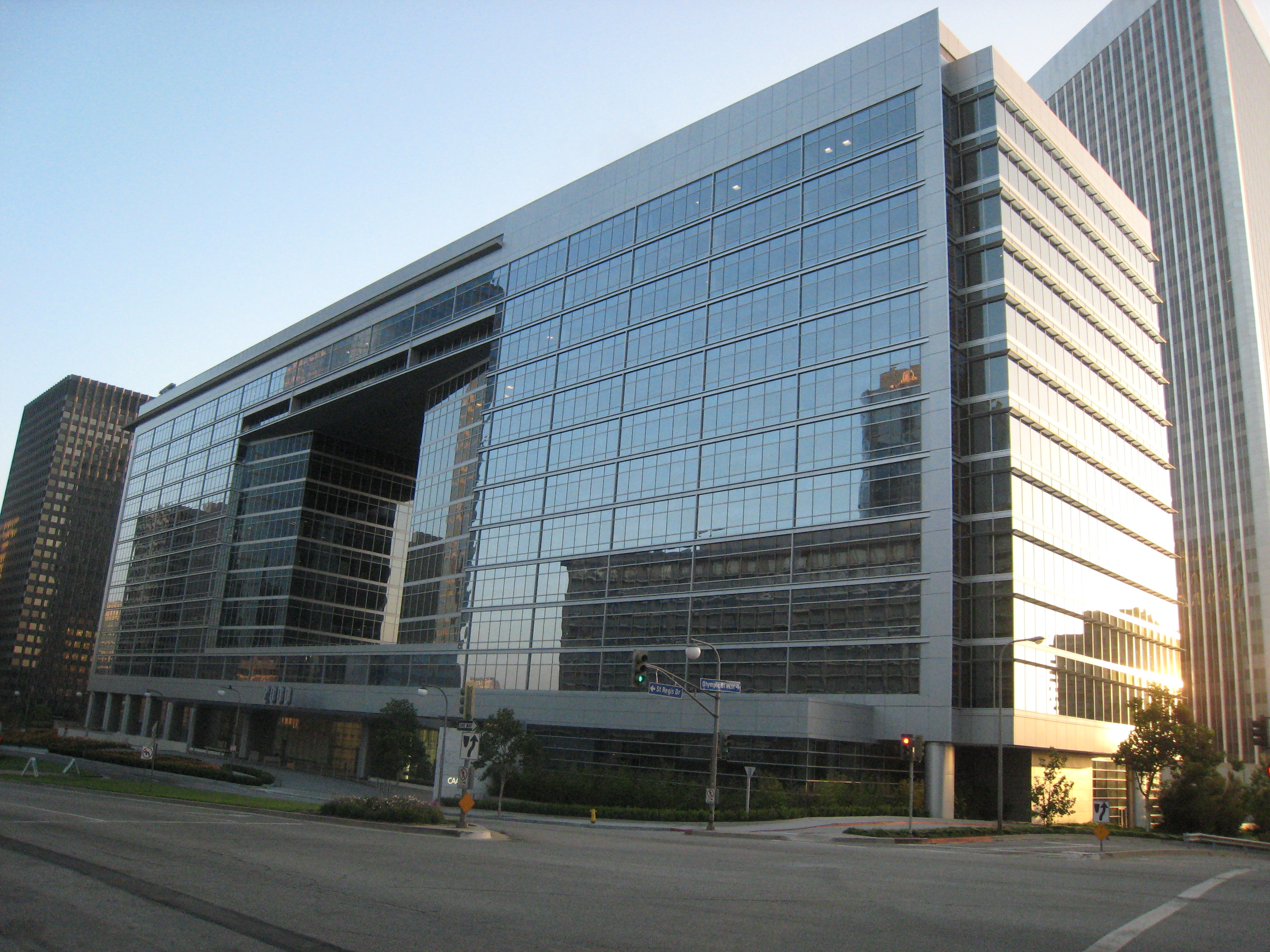
- Type: Limited liability company
- Founded: 1975; 51 years ago in Beverly Hills, California, U.S.
- Founder: Michael Ovitz; Ronald Meyer; Bill Haber; Michael S. Rosenfeld; Rowland Perkins
- Headquarters: Century City, Los Angeles, California, U.S.
- Key people: Bryan Lourd (Co-Chairman & CEO); Kevin Huvane (Co-Chairman); Richard Lovett (Co-Chairman); James Burtson (President)
- Website: caa.com

Creative Artists Agency, LLC (CAA) is an American talent and sports agency based in Los Angeles, California.

In September 2023, French billionaire François-Henri Pinault completed the acquisition of a majority stake in CAA, in an agreement valued at US$7 billion. The purchase was made through his investment company, Groupe Artémis.

== History ==
Creative Artists Agency (CAA) was formed by five agents at the William Morris Agency in 1975. At a dinner, Michael Ovitz, Michael S. Rosenfeld, Ronald Meyer, Rowland Perkins, and William Haber decided to create their own agency. The agents were fired by William Morris before they could obtain financing.

CAA was incorporated in Delaware and had a $35,000 line of credit, a $21,000 bank loan, and a small, rented Century City office. Within a week, they sold a game show called Rhyme and Reason, the Rich Little Show, and The Jackson 5ive. An early plan was to form a mid-sized full-service agency, share proceeds equally, and do without nameplates on doors or formal titles or individual client lists, with guidelines like "be a team player" and "return phone calls promptly."

CAA used its writer clients to attract actors to the agency. Ovitz and CAA were the first to package films like TV shows. Representing numerous A-list actors and having about $90 million in annual bookings in the late 1970s, Ovitz led the agency to expand into the film business. By the mid-1990s, CAA had 550 employees, about 1,400 of Hollywood's top talent as clients, and $150 million in revenue. In the 1990s, CAA was majority-owned by several key agents, including Ovitz, Meyer, and Haber.

Ovitz was good at "packaging talent for movies and TV projects" and negotiating large deals between Japanese conglomerates, such as Sony and Matsushita, with Hollywood studios, such as Columbia/TriStar and MCA. Ovitz expanded the agency into advertising and telecommunications. In 1992, the Coca-Cola Company placed CAA in charge of much of its marketing campaign, to work alongside advertising agency McCann Erickson. In 1993, CAA hosted then-President Bill Clinton, who gave a speech about the role of entertainment. In 1995, CAA was described as the industry's most powerful agency.

In 1995, Ron Meyer was appointed as the head of MCA, and Ovitz left for Disney. After Ovitz and Meyer left, talent agent Jay Moloney took over the company but struggled with a drug addiction and left the agency soon afterward. After Ovitz, the agency was taken over by Richard Lovett, who was made the president, along with Kevin Huvane, Rob Light, Bryan Lourd, Rick Nicita, and David O'Connor as managing partners.

In 1996, several CAA agents defected to rival agency Endeavor, taking with them prominent directors and actors. The partners founded the CAA Foundation in 1996 to create positive social change by encouraging volunteerism, partnerships, and donations. In 2012, it worked with Insight Labs for education reform, and contributed to its School Is Not School reform effort.

CAA established CAA Marketing in 1998 to work with brands and clients for promotion purposes. CAA Marketing developed Chipotle's Back to the Start video and created a marketing campaign for the Coca-Cola Company.

In 2003, it opened a New York City office to manage theater clients. From 2005 to 2015, CAA developed greater fiscal discipline, with more emphasis on profits, possibly as the result of the influence of private equity firms. During these years, CAA doubled in size, from 750 to 1,500 employees. In 2010, new technological developments such as the digital distribution of movies put strains on the industry. There was pressure to diversify into television, publishing, concerts, and find other ways to grow. In that year, private equity firm TPG Capital invested $165 million with an additional $200 million in debt financing.

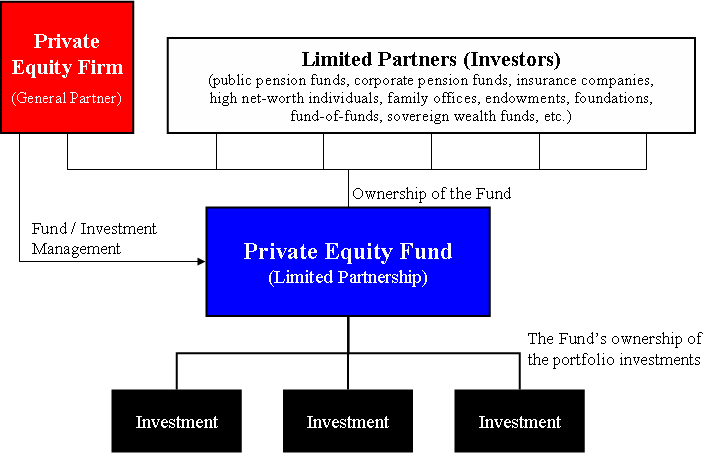
To expand, CAA borrowed capital from private equity firm TPG Capital. TPG owns 35% of CAA, according to one estimate in 2014.

CAA began an expansion into sports in 2006, under the leadership of CEO Richard Lovett. A report in USA Today suggested that CAA's development of its sports-related clientele was significant in 2007. A report in Nexus magazine in 2015 suggested that CAA was well-positioned to develop the E-Sports market. CAA puts together deals for sports stars such as writing their clients into fitness apps.

CAA's agents scrambled to deal with a strike by the Screen Actors Guild in 2008. In 2010, TPG Capital gained a 35% interest in the agency and pledged $500 million for investments. The transaction enabled acquisitions in areas such as sports and overseas operations.

It later sold a controlling stake to TPG Capital in October 2014. In 2015, TPG Capital was reported to own 53% of CAA. CAA is co-owner with an investment bank.

CAA has diversified into different businesses such as sports marketers and leagues and digital commerce. In 2014, CAA has been undergoing a transformation from relying solely on booking talent, into engineering multimedia deals worldwide. To this end, CAA established CAA Ventures, a venture capital fund that has supported products such as the Whisper app.

The WGA, which in 2019 held a dispute between the top four Hollywood talent agencies (William Morris Endeavor, Creative Artists Agency, United Talent Agency and ICM Partners), on September 30, 2020, asked CAA to sell a majority stake in their Content company wiip for reaching a deal, with CAA accepting their divestment on December 16, 2020 and selling the majority of it to a South Korean studio, JTBC.

In June 2022, nine months after it was announced that CAA would acquire ICM Partners, a deal valued at $750 million was reached between the agencies. - following the acquisition, about 425 ICM staffers and agents were slated to join CAA. In September 2023, French billionaire François-Henri Pinault agreed to buy a majority stake.

On January 20, 2025, former President Joe Biden moved back to Wilmington, Delaware, after his term ended. He later signed with talent agency CAA to represent him in public engagements. CAA previously represented him from 2017 to 2020.

In February 2025, former Vice President Kamala Harris signed with CAA for representation on speaking engagements and publishing. The company has signed other high-profile Democratic politicians, including former President Barack Obama, former Senator Joe Manchin and former House representative Beto O'Rourke.

In June 2026, CAA and Integrated Media Company (an investment arm of TPG Capital) established Compound Creative Holdings to invest, operate or acquire businesses founded by online content creators.

Former NFL executive VP and chief administrative officer Dasha Smith joined CAA as COO in October 2026.

=== Practice of blacklisting, Harvey Weinstein ===
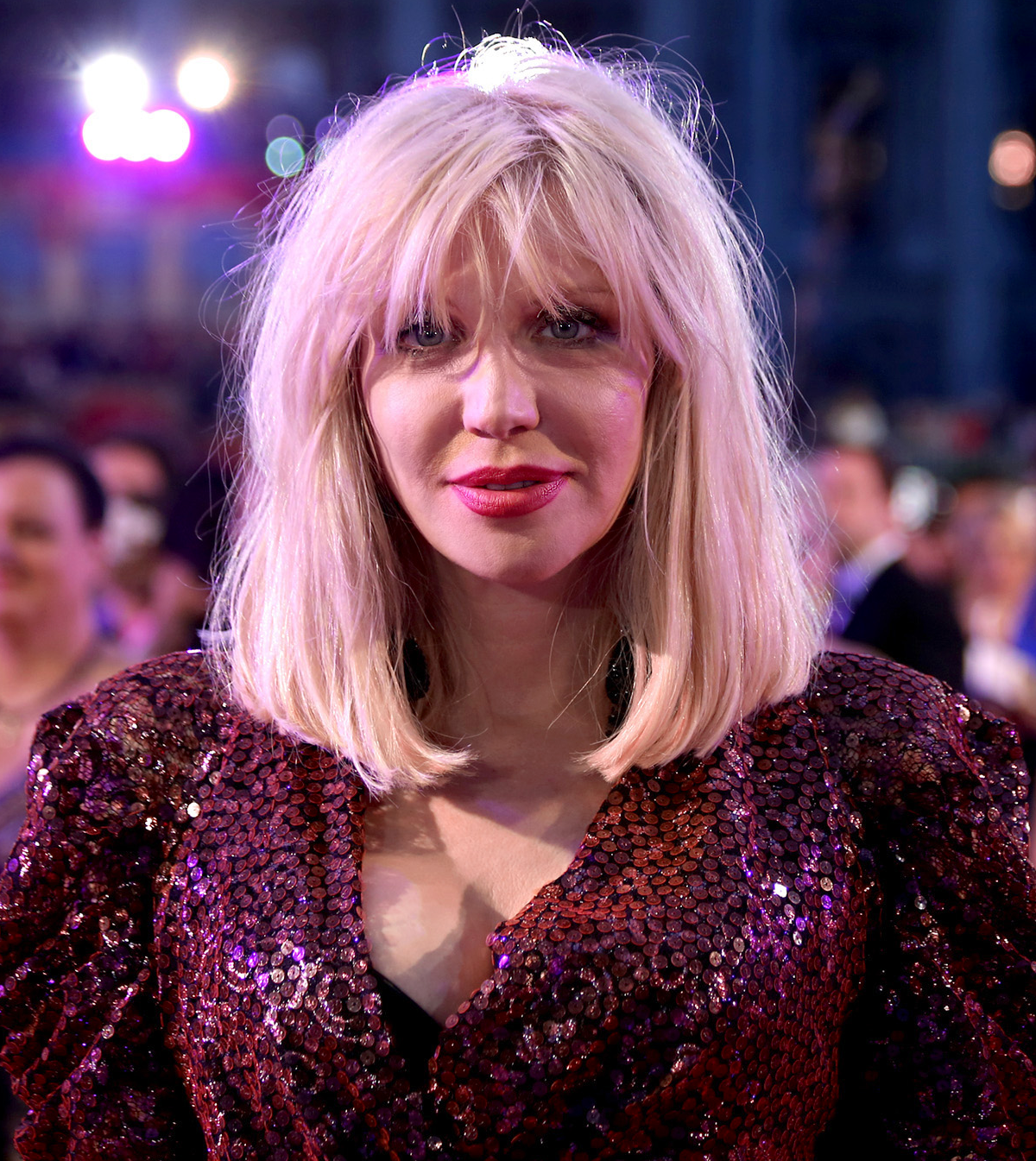
Courtney Love contends that she was blacklisted since 2005 by CAA for making a comment about now-disgraced producer Harvey Weinstein.

The agency has been accused of blacklisting people who did or said things that the agency did not want publicized. For example, In December 2017, there were reports that the agency was actively involved in coverups relating to abuse and harassment by now-disgraced Miramax executive Harvey Weinstein. Variety, citing a report in The New York Times, reported that at least eight agents knew about the ongoing harassment yet continued to do business with Weinstein, and even sent actresses to meet with him in situations where they might have been vulnerable to his predations. Actress Uma Thurman accused the agency of being connected to Weinstein's predatory behavior. Thurman left CAA on November 22, 2017, the day before making an Instagram post addressing accusations against Weinstein. In 2005, Courtney Love advised young actresses in an interview, "If Harvey Weinstein invites you to a private party in the Four Seasons, don't go." Love later said that she was "banned" by CAA for speaking out about Weinstein.

=== Competition ===
CAA was formed in 1975 from defections from the William Morris Agency, and the entertainment world continues to support four or five major talent agencies.

In 2009, William Morris Agency and Endeavor merged to form Endeavor Holdings. In 2014, Endeavour bought IMG Worldwide, a fashion and sports agency, for $2.4 billion. In 2014, Endeavour had 4500 employees while CAA had 1500 employees. Endeavour had a larger share of sports-related clients. As of 2015, CAA and Endeavour are the largest agencies in the business. The rivalry can get cantankerous: in one instance, Endeavour placed dozens of ads around the city using CAA's red-and-white colour signature with the headline being CAAN'T, a "playful nod to the CAA acronym." The agencies compete by "regularly poaching agents and clients from one another."

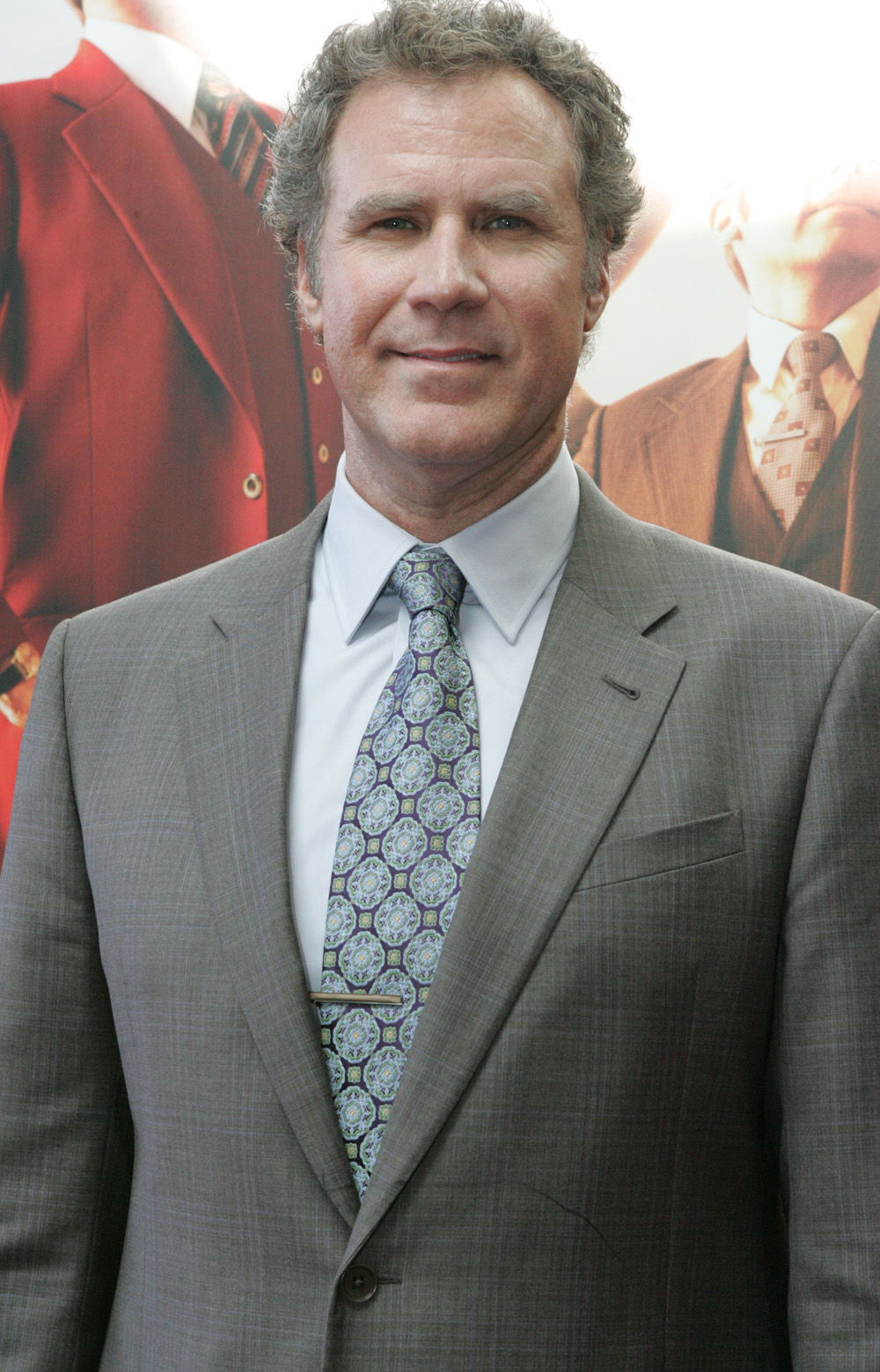
The departure of comedy star Will Ferrell led to major legal battling.

Top agencies frequently raid each other's staff, and when key people defect to rivals, it makes news headlines and often leads to legal battles over breach-of-contract claims. When agents defect, the rivalry can quickly devolve into vicious battles played out in courtrooms and in the media. When key CAA clients Will Ferrell and Chris Pratt defected to rival United Talent Agency (UTA) in 2015, and were later followed by ten agents, it erupted into a full-frontal legal battle between the warring agencies. In the lawsuit, CAA accused UTA of conducting a "lawless, midnight raid" as part of an "illegal and unethical conspiracy" with agents deliberately delaying meetings with clients to divert business to UTA. In a bitter lawsuit and countersuit between CAA and UTA in 2015, which began after a slew of CAA's agents departed for UTA, there were accusations of fraud, malicious untruths, lying, and a range of charges including a "breach of duty of loyalty" as well as "conspiracy to breach fiduciary duty."

Rivalry is not limited to rank-and-file agents, but can take the form of public barbs by company CEOs. Grudges can last for years; for example, movie producer Jay Weston sued CAA in 1979 about the rights to a film, and years later, it was revealed that Weston was "totally ostracized" by the agency. In effect, CAA would do the minimally required legal tasks of passing along required offers but otherwise staying uninvolved.

== Agents ==
Perhaps because of its dominance in the industry, CAA agents have a reputation for being "coldhearted Hollywood power brokers," according to one report in The Wall Street Journal. Some agents have had a reputation in the public's mind of living in a world of "fast cars, rooftop bars and foul-mouthed, phone-throwing power brokers," according to an account in the Los Angeles Times.

CAA agent Jay Moloney (1964–1999) led a colorful yet self-destructive life. Moloney interned at CAA while studying at USC, became the right-hand man of Michael Ovitz, worked with clients such as Leonardo DiCaprio and made millions, dated actresses such as Jennifer Grey and Gina Gershon, and "battled personal demons" and became a "slave to cocaine"; Moloney committed suicide at age 35.

CAA has employed noted sports agents such as Tom Condon, Jeff Berry, and Tory Dandy.

CAA president Richard Lovett is known for shunning media attention and keeping a low profile. Lovett took the job position at CAA in 1995, and he was described as a "skillful agent" with a "trademark ever-ready smile" adept at schmoozing and hobnobbing with colleagues and studio heads. Lovett was described in The Wall Street Journal as being "elegantly aggressive."

In 2004, the HBO production entitled Entourage was made about a fictional Hollywood agent named Ari Gold. According to one report, the fictional Ari Gold character may have been based on a hybrid between an "even-keeled" Creative Artists Agency agent named Jeff Jacobs and an "abrasive 'go-for-the-jugular'" William Morris Endeavor agent named Ari Emanuel. The report suggested that images like these may contribute to the public perception of agents as foul-mouthed and aggressive bullies.

== Operations ==
With many clients, agents charge a percentage fee based on what their clients make; one estimate was that CAA charges 10% of what its movie and television clients are paid.

CAA chiefs including Michael Ovitz, Ron Meyer and Bill Haber built the agency by packaging actors and directors with literary clients, but the scope of deal-making has widened in recent decades. For example, CAA crafted a deal between toy-maker Hasbro, DreamWorks and Paramount Pictures, along with numerous CAA writers and directors, to make the movie franchise Transformers. Sometimes deal-making entails creating new technology firms. CAA even manages deals with the estates of long-dead clients such as reggae musician Bob Marley, who died in 1981. CAA helped one former politician create an online career institute. CAA sold sponsorship rights for a baseball stadium in San Francisco.

While talent agencies can grow by making acquisitions, CAA has generally grown organically by bringing in new clients. The company divided its agents into two camps: traditional agents who manage the career tracks of 1,000 stars, and specialists in investment banking, consulting, advertising and digital media. The agency can use its more glamorous clients in film and TV to craft deals with steadier income streams; for example, using clients such as Julia Roberts, they can assemble marketing programs for less glamorous clients, such as Nationwide Insurance.

When Hollywood agents change firms, and take stars and talent with them, it can have major financial repercussions for the departing agency.

=== Buildings ===
In the late 1980s, CAA commissioned architect I. M. Pei to design a new headquarters building at the corner of Santa Monica and Wilshire Boulevards in Beverly Hills. The 75,000-square-foot (7,000 m^{2}) building consists of two curved wings set around a central atrium with a skylight that rises into a conical glass tower. The 57-foot (17 m) high atrium was designed as an art-filled formal reception hall with a 100-seat screening room and gourmet kitchen and displays a 27-foot (8.2 m) by 18-foot (5.5 m) mural by Roy Lichtenstein. The design used feng shui principles.

In 2007, CAA relocated to a new building in Century City, a district of Los Angeles. The new headquarters are sometimes referred to as "The Death Star" by entertainment professionals. CAA has offices in Los Angeles, New York, Nashville, London, Beijing, Atlanta, Miami, Chicago, Memphis, Stockholm, Munich and Switzerland.

In January 2022, CAA announced it would move its headquarters across the street from its existing office in 2026.

== Controversies ==
To market themselves, talent agencies often cater exclusive parties following awards ceremonies such as the Golden Globes. In 2013, CAA threw a party at the Sundance Film Festival which caused embarrassment and a public relations backlash, where "guests mingled with lingerie-clad women pretending to snort prop cocaine, erotic dancers outfitted with sex toys and an Alice in Wonderland look-alike performing a simulated sex act on a man in a rabbit costume."

In October 2023, Maha Dakhil resigned from the agency's internal board after making comments on social media critical of Israel during the Gaza war. The post read, "You're currently learning who supports genocide," and she added her own caption: "That's the line for me.". Subsequently, Aaron Sorkin left CAA as a result of her comments and she issued an apology that read “I made a mistake with a repost in my Instagram story, which used hurtful language. Like so many of us, I have been reeling with heartbreak. I pride myself on being on the side of humanity and peace. I’m so grateful to Jewish friends and colleagues who pointed out the implications and further educated me. I immediately took the repost down. I’m sorry for the pain I have caused.” This was in reference to the CAA making a statement in support of Israel in an Instagram post.
