= Abe Newborn =

American talent agent and theatre producer

- Born: February 7, 1920
- Died: August 12, 1997 (aged 77); New York City, U.S.
- Occupations: Talent agency, theatre producer

Abe Newborn (February 7, 1920 – August 12, 1997) was an American talent agent and theatre producer.

== Early life ==
Newborn was born on February 7, 1920.

== Career ==
Newborn co-founded the Baum-Newborn Agency with Martin Baum in 1948. He represented Robert Alda, Vivian Blaine, Jose Ferrer, Hume Cronyn, Joel Grey, Tony Roberts and Betty Buckley, Cy Coleman, Meredith Willson, Dorothy Fields and Martin Charnin. Newborn and Baum later sold the firm to General Artists Corporation.

Newborn dabbled in other areas of theater as well. He was credited for "chants and cantoral selections" in addition to assistant stage managing in the 1948 production of Skipper Next to God. In the 1956 production of Middle of the Night at the ANTA Playhouse, he acted as a casting consultant with colleague Martin Baum.

Newborn was credited in part for causing the adaptation of the book How To Succeed In Business Without Really Trying into a musical. While it had been adapted into a dramatic play by playwright Willie Gilbert and Jack Weinstock, it remained unproduced. In 1960, Newborn brought the play to the attention of Cy Feuer and Ernest Martin, producers who thought it could be a Broadway musical. The original 1961 Broadway production of How To Succeed In Business Without Really Trying (the musical) ran for 1,417 performances and won 7 Tony Awards, plus the Pulitzer Prize for Drama.

Newborn famously said of Barbra Streisand, "She'll never be a star unless she gets her nose fixed."

In 1967, Newborn co-chaired a benefit dance with Benjamin Bartel and Sidney Sheinberg. Proceeds from the event supported tuition at Ramaz School.

== Personal life and death ==
With his wife Joyce, Newborn had a son, Sam Newborn, a daughter, Marian Newborn Tenenbein, and five grandchildren. They resided in Manhattan.

Newborn died on August 12, 1997 of congestive heart failure at Mount Sinai Hospital in Manhattan.
