= Latin School of Chicago =

Private school in Chicago, Illinois, US

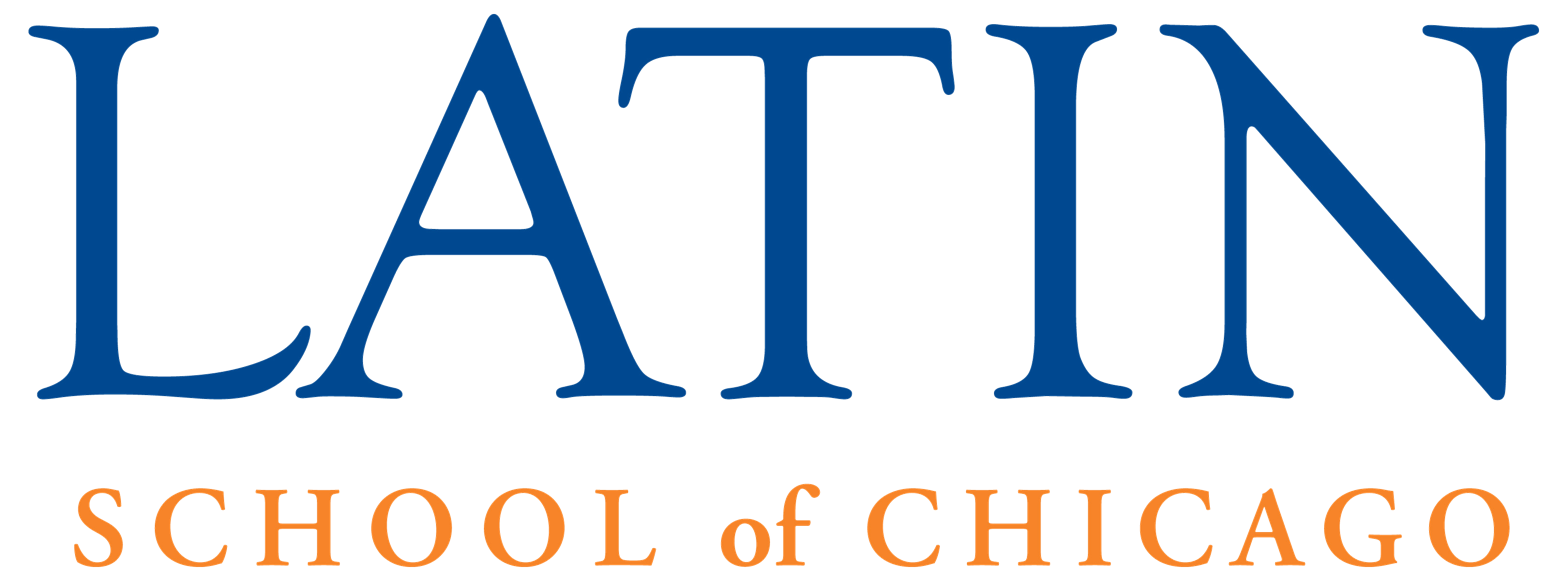

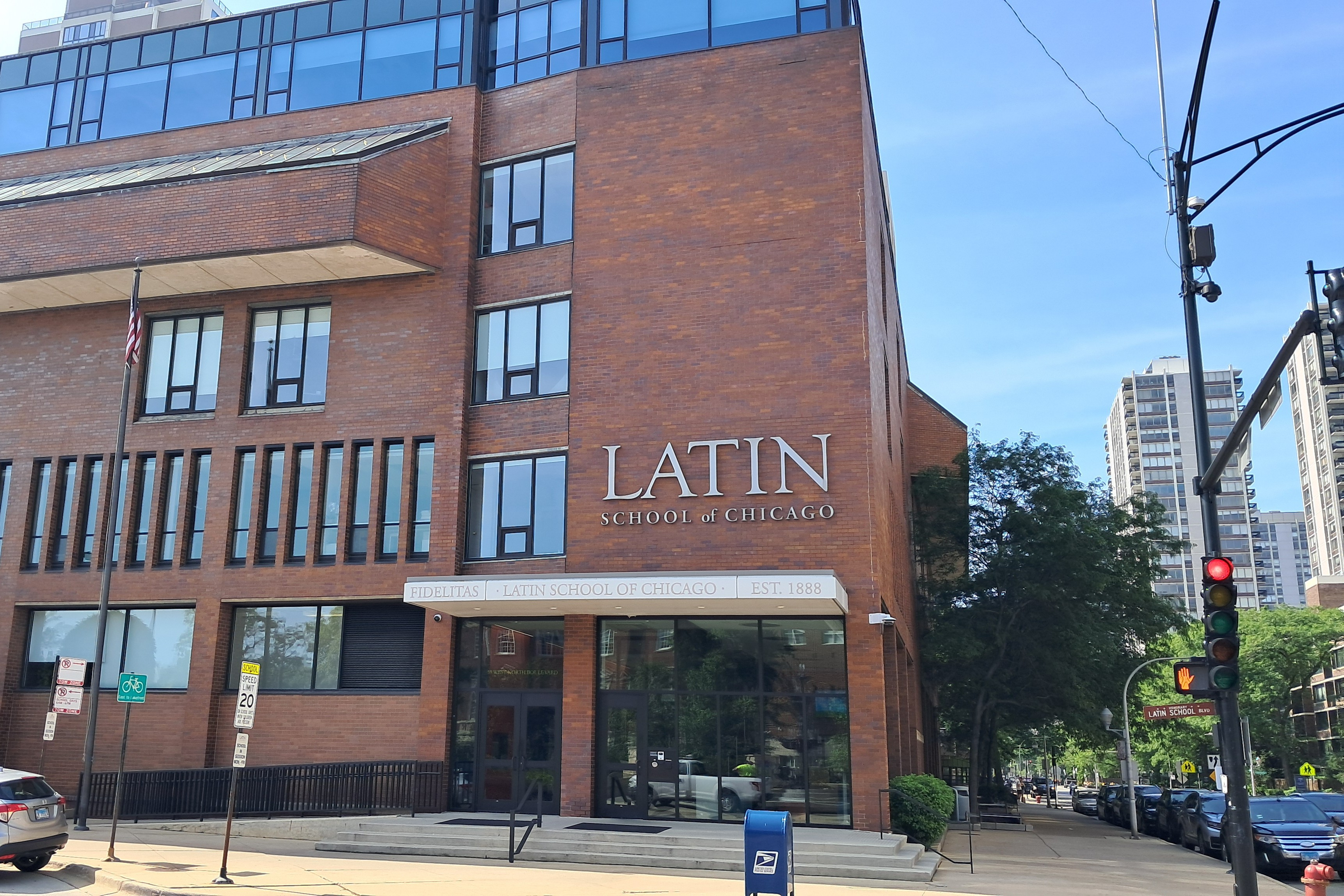

Location
- 59 W. North Boulevard; Chicago, Illinois 60610; United States; 41.9108°N 87.6313°W

Information
- School type: Private
- Motto: Semper Fidelitas (Faithfulness always)
- Established: 1888
- Grades: K–12
- Enrollment: 378 (elementary; 2025–26); 300 (middle; 2025–26); 512 (high school; 2025–26)
- Colors: Orange; Blue
- Athletics conference: ISL
- Team name: Romans
- Newspaper: The Forum
- Yearbook: The Roman
- Website: latinschool.org

Latin School of Chicago is a private elementary, middle, and high school located in the Gold Coast neighborhood on the Near North Side of Chicago, Illinois, United States. The school was founded in 1888 by Mabel Slade Vickery. The school is a member of the Independent School League (ISL). Latin serves students in junior kindergarten (JK), senior kindergarten (SK), and 1st-12th grades.

== Background ==
=== History ===
Latin School was formed in 1888 by a group of parents seeking a better education for their children. Mabel Slade Vickery, a teacher from the East Coast, was invited to Chicago to open the school with a small class of ten 10-year-old boys. During the early years, classes were held in private homes on Chicago's near North Side. The parent-owned institution flourished and in 1899, with enrollment of more than 100 boys, the school moved into its own building and officially became Chicago Latin School.

In 1913, a girls section was incorporated by Miss Vickery and became the Chicago Latin School for Girls. The schools merged in 1953 to form the co-educational Latin School of Chicago. The school was designed to provide students with a rigorous college-preparatory education in the classical tradition, with a curriculum that was heavily influenced by Classical studies and the study of the Greek and Latin languages, hence the name "Latin School." The Latin language is still taught in the middle and upper schools today.

While it was started as a neighborhood school, Latin School currently is home to more than 1,100 students from approximately 46 ZIP codes and 24 suburbs throughout the Chicago area. The school awards more than $5.6 million in need-based financial aid each year to the 12.5% of its students receiving financial aid. Latin is consistently ranked among the top private high schools in the Chicagoland area.

== Campus and academics ==
The current campus has three buildings. The lower school (junior kindergarten to grade 4) building is the oldest structure dating to 1926 and is located at 1531 N. Dearborn. The upper school (grades 9–12) building at 59 W. North was completed in 1969. The middle school (grades 5–8) building, located at 45 W. North, was completed in the fall of 2007. It includes a green roof garden and was designed with environmentally friendly materials. The building was awarded LEED Gold certification by the U.S. Green Building Council in 2012.

The upper school building was designed by internationally acclaimed architect Harry Weese. The upper and middle school buildings are connected by two bridges, and both divisions use both buildings, with many middle school arts and PE classes held in the US and all HS science classes in the designated science center in the MS. The average class size is 14 students and the student-to-faculty ratio is 8:1. The school offers over 150 courses, several at honors level and about a dozen at AP level. Several electives are also offered.

Latin sees a high degree of success from its students, who have become influential across the public, private, and medical sectors. In the last five years, students have been accepted to 304 different colleges and universities, as the school has boasted a 100% college matriculation rate. Each year, around 20-30 members of its graduating senior class started at Latin 14 years prior, as members of the Junior Kindergarten (JK).

== Visual arts ==
Latin has a visual arts department, which offers many extracurricular/elective opportunities and a Global Studies: Visual Arts class. The school is also noted for its Mickey & The Masters project where, as a culmination of their study of the History of Western Painting, ninth grade students recreate master paintings with the added challenge of substituting Mickey Mouse as the main character. The school has two galleries with 14 events hosted annually in the school's Gallery 2.

== Musical and performing arts ==
Several electives and extracurriculars focus on performing arts, music, and public presentation. The school holds around 20 yearly performing arts productions and concerts, including faculty- and student-directed plays, semesterly band and chorus concerts, a student-faculty chorale, and semesterly dance performances. The productions are well funded by the school.

== Extracurriculars ==
Latin School of Chicago offers a wide range of student-run clubs and affinity groups that enrich student life and foster community. Affinity groups provide spaces for students with shared backgrounds and identities to explore common experiences, promote inclusivity, and support one another. These groups vary by division and include organizations such as the Asian Student Alliance (ASA), Black Student Union (BSU), Latin American Student Organization (LASO), LGBTQI+, Neurodiversity, and Young Women of Color in the Upper School, as well as similar identity-based groups in the Lower and Middle Schools.

In addition to affinity groups, Latin students in both the Middle and Upper Schools can participate in a diverse array of clubs that align with academic interests, hobbies, service, and leadership. Middle School offerings include Math Club, Debate, Model UN, Science Olympiad, Green Club, and more, while the Upper School hosts extensive options such as A Cappella, Cyber Patriot, FTC Robotics, Table Tennis Club, various advocacy and cultural clubs, student newspapers like The Forum, and many others.

== Athletics ==
The Latin School of Chicago's mascot is the Roman. Teams compete in the Independent School League (ISL).

=== Fall ===
- Boys' cross country (JV/varsity)
- Girls' cross country (JV/varsity)
- Girls' field hockey (JV/varsity)
- Boys' & girls' golf (JV/varsity)
- Boys' soccer (JV/varsity)
- Girls' swimming (JV/varsity)
- Girls' tennis (JV/varsity)
- Girls' volleyball (freshman/JV/varsity)
- Coed sailing (JV/varsity)

=== Winter ===
- Boys' basketball (freshman/JV/varsity)
- Girls' basketball (JV/varsity)
- Boys' ice hockey (JV/varsity)
- Girls' ice hockey (varsity)
- Boys' swimming (JV/varsity)

=== Spring ===
- Boys' baseball (JV/varsity)
- Girls' soccer (JV/varsity)
- Girls' softball (JV/varsity)
- Boys' tennis (JV/varsity)
- Boys' track (JV/varsity)
- Girls' track (JV/varsity)
- Boys' volleyball (JV/varsity)
- Boys' water polo (JV/varsity)
- Girls' water polo (JV/varsity)
- Boys' lacrosse (varsity)
- Girls' lacrosse (varsity)
- Club coed ultimate frisbee
- Coed sailing (JV/varsity)

== Controversies ==
=== Cyberbullying ===
In January 2022, Nathan Bronstein, a former student at the Latin School of Chicago, died by suicide. A wrongful death lawsuit was filed against the school, select school officials, and certain parents in the Circuit Court of Cook County, Illinois. The lawsuit claimed breach of contract by the school and its officials for failing to follow its own anti-bullying policies. The lawsuit also alleged that no disciplinary action was taken against those involved despite complaints to the school's dean of students. Latin School of Chicago denied the allegations and claims. In 2026, the Illinois Court of Appeals affirmed the trial court's dismissal of most of Bronstein's claims.

=== COVID-era loans ===
In April 2020, the school received an unspecified amount in federally-backed small business loans as part of the Paycheck Protection Program. Latin School returned it after receiving scrutiny over this loan, which meant to protect small and private businesses. Treasury Secretary Steven Mnuchin tweeted that the schools should return the money. The New York Times noted the school's endowment is $58.5 million.

=== Lincoln Park Soccer Field ===
In the mid-2000s, the Latin School of Chicago became involved in a public controversy concerning a proposed artificial turf soccer field in Lincoln Park to be built as a public field to be used by members of the community. Under a 2007 agreement, the school agreed to contribute approximately $1.6 million toward construction in exchange for reported priority access to the field. The agreement drew opposition from local groups, who argued that it granted preferential access to public parkland to a private institution, and raised concerns about transparency. Community groups organized protests and filed legal challenges. In 2008, the Chicago Park District terminated the agreement following a court ruling amid public opposition and reimbursed the Latin School. The Chicago Park District subsequently completed the field using approximately $2.1 million of public funds.

== Notable alumni ==
- Conor Allen – professional hockey player
- Bob Balaban – actor and author
- Ike Barinholtz – comedian
- Bradley Bell – television writer and producer
- Lauralee Bell – actress
- Matt Brandstein – writer/actor
- Roe Conn – radio talk show host
- Billy Dec – Rockit Ranch Productions CEO and founder, actor
- Grant DePorter – restaurateur
- Douglas Diamond – economist, 2022 Nobel Prize winner
- Filligar – band (Casey Gibson, Johnny, Teddy, Peter Mathias)
- Cassidy Freeman – actor
- Crispin Freeman – voice actor
- John Fritchey – Cook County commissioner, 12th District
- Kenny George – college basketball player, tallest basketball player in NCAA history
- Alexi Giannoulias – Illinois secretary of state
- Douglas H. Ginsburg – judge of the United States Court of Appeals for the District of Columbia Circuit, US Supreme Court nominee
- Mitch Glasser – American-Israeli baseball player
- Nina Gordon – singer and songwriter, founding member of alternative rock band Veruca Salt, daughter of former Monsanto chairman Robert Shapiro
- Laura Granville – professional tennis player, 2-time NCAA champion, head coach of women's tennis at Princeton University
- Stephen S. Gregory Jr., investment advisor and ornithologist
- Johnny Groth – Major League Baseball player
- John Marshall Harlan II – US Supreme Court justice
- William Horberg – executive producer, film and television
- Jessica Jackson Hutchins – artist
- Rick Kogan – Chicago newspaperman, radio personality and author
- Lisa Madigan – Illinois attorney general
- Sarah Danielle Madison – actress (mostly TV)
- Johanes Maliza – professional soccer player
- Meredith Marks – television personality
- Ryan Marks – men's college basketball coach
- Brooks McCormick – International Harvester Company CEO and philanthropist
- Roger McGuinn – singer and songwriter, founding member of the Byrds
- Carol Mendelsohn – television producer and writer
- Claes Oldenburg – sculptor
- Walter Paepcke – industrialist, philanthropist and founder of Aspen Skiing Company
- Paul Raphaelson – artist
- Nancy Reagan – actress and First Lady of the United States 1981–89
- Maurice Samuels – author and professor of French at Yale University
- Lincoln Schatz – artist
- Jim Shapiro – drummer for Veruca Salt, brother of Nina Gordon, son of former Monsanto chairman Robert Shapiro
- Adlai Stevenson III – U.S. senator, candidate for governor, son of presidential candidate Adlai E. Stevenson
- Neil Strauss – journalist and author
- Jonathan Turley – attorney
- Bill Wirtz – former businessman and Chicago Blackhawks owner
- William Wrigley, Jr. II – business executive
