= Michael S. Rosenfeld =

American talent agent (1934–2010)

- Born: June 28, 1934; Philadelphia, Pennsylvania, U.S.
- Died: March 25, 2010 (aged 75); Santa Monica, California, U.S.
- Other name: Mike Rosenfeld
- Occupation: Talent Agent
- Known for: Founding member of CAA
- Children: Jackson Rosenfeld, Molly Rosenfeld, Mike Rosenfeld, Max Rosenfeld

Michael Stuart Rosenfeld (June 28, 1934 – March 25, 2010) was a talent agent, movie producer, and co-founder of Creative Artists Agency.

== Early life ==
Rosenfeld was born in Philadelphia to Maxwell S. Rosenfeld, who became a Pennsylvania state senator, and Edith Rosenfeld. He graduated from Lower Merion High School and Pennsylvania State University, where he earned his bachelor's degree. He was of Jewish descent.

== Career ==
In 1975, Rosenfeld, Michael Ovitz, Bill Haber, Ronald Meyer, and Rowland Perkins left the William Morris Agency left to form CAA.

== Later life ==
In 1986, Rosenfeld left CAA to become an executive producer of films, including Thrashin', Flowers in the Attic, and work in television with Emmy-nominated Case of the Hillside Stranglers. He moved to Sonoma Valley to share his love of flight, giving new pilots their instrument rating and sending them on their way to their pilots license. He continued his close friendships with Ronald Meyer and industry friends.

== Death ==
He died of respiratory failure at a Santa Monica, California hospital. He is survived by his sons Michael A. Rosenfeld, Max Rosenfeld, Jackson Rosenfeld, and his daughter Molly Rosenfeld.
