= Illinois Chamber of Commerce =

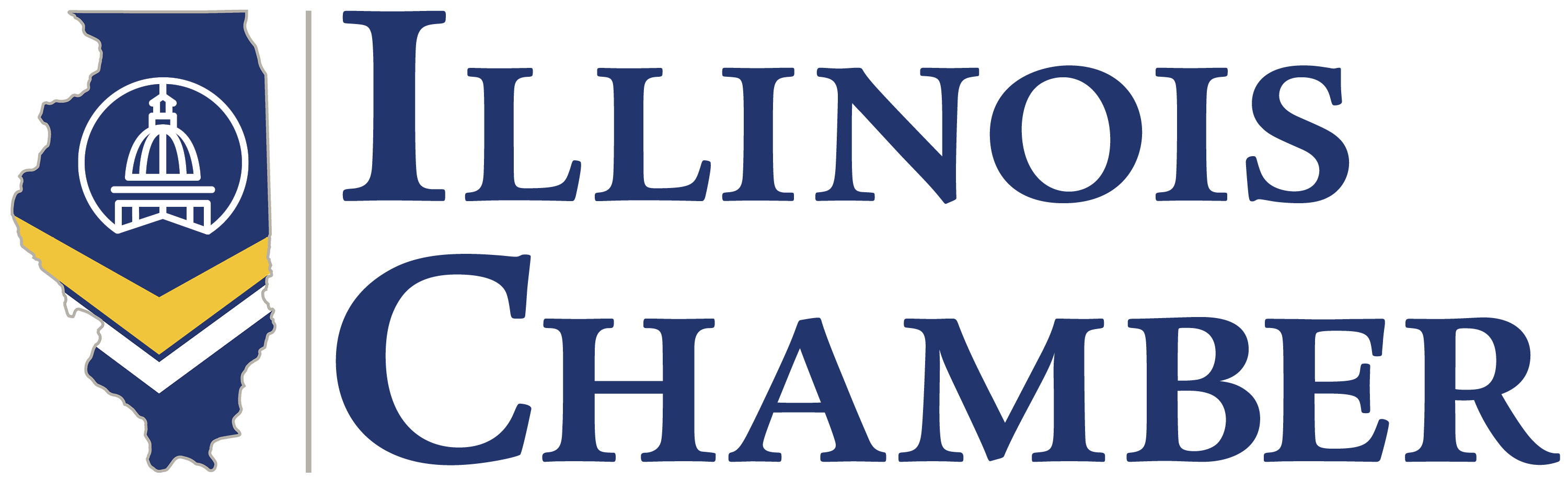
- Founded: 1919
- Type: Advocacy group
- Purpose: Business advocacy
- Headquarters: Springfield, Illinois
- Location: Chicago, Illinois, Springfield, Illinois
- Region served: Illinois
- Method: Political lobbying
- President and CEO: Jimmy Clayton
- Chairman of the Board: Dan Wagner
- Chief Operating Officer and General Counsel: Lori Poppe Hiltabrand
- Website: https://ilchamber.org/

The Illinois Chamber of Commerce is a business advocacy group representing the interests of businesses across the U.S. state of Illinois. It is not a government agency, but a non-profit membership business advocacy organization.

The Chamber is staffed with policy experts, lobbyists, and business advocates. Politically, the Chamber is pro-growth, pro-business and pro-Illinois. As a non-partisan organization, it works across party lines in the interest of the entire Illinois business community. The Chamber is one of the largest broad-based business advocacy groups in Illinois which represents members from various industry sectors and revenue sizes ranging from small businesses to Fortune 500 corporations.

== History ==
On May 27, 1919, 24 business leaders assembled in Quincy, Illinois from various locations throughout the state to deal with the issue of what they considered too much government in business and to "promote and protect the business climate in Illinois". On August 2, 1919, the Illinois Chamber was officially chartered by the Illinois Secretary of State's office, with its charter membership seeking to promote and develop Illinois, foster its abundance of natural resources, and improve its conditions so the greatest possible benefit and enjoyment could be derived by living in Illinois. At first, the Illinois Chamber and its membership pledged to "refrain from any political involvement", however, it eventually provided legislative information regularly to its members, and in 1923, an office in Springfield was opened for that very purpose. In the early years, the Illinois Chamber was a driving force behind the formation of the Illinois State Police and the establishment of an appointed Illinois State Board of Education.

The chamber's mission as the leading business organization in Illinois, the Illinois Chamber of Commerce is dedicated to advocating for a business environment that promotes economic growth, free enterprise, and a competitive economic environment for businesses of all sizes and across all industries. The Illinois Chamber works as an independent entity, taking no source of funding from the Illinois State Government

The chamber's focus is to raise and expend funds from its members for the purposes of financing and sponsoring, publishing, promoting and distributing research on issues important to businesses or issues and analyses of the Illinois economy and business climate; provide educational forums that facilitate the discussion and debate of policy or operational matters that impact businesses generally, business segments of the Illinois economy, or the Illinois business climate; and with other organizations, sponsor activities and research projects that are consistent with the stated purposes above.” The Illinois Chamber serves businesses large and small and works with state government leaders regardless of party affiliation to educate and influence lawmakers on ways to enhance the state's economy through enacting pro-business legislation.

The Illinois Chamber has hosted many political leaders in the past, including President George W. Bush in 2008 when he addressed Illinois Chamber members and the world about the state of the economy.

The Illinois Chamber serves all businesses and employers in Illinois.

== Functions ==
=== Membership ===
Membership is the driving force behind the Illinois Chamber's operation, working with employers across the state to develop a pro-growth, pro-business, pro-Illinois agenda. The Illinois chamber of Commerce does not receive funding from any governmental entity and is fully independent.

=== Political Action Committee ===
Created in 1975, Chamber PAC is one of the oldest business political action committees in Illinois.

=== Foundation ===
The main purpose of the Illinois Chamber of Commerce Foundation is to raise and expend funds for financing and sponsoring, publishing, promoting, and distributing research on issues important to businesses or issues and analyses of the Illinois economy and business climate; providing educational forums that facilitate the discussion and debate of policy or operational matters that impact businesses generally, business segments of the Illinois economy, or the Illinois business climate; and with other organizations, sponsor activities, and research projects that are consistent with the stated purposes above.

== Legislative Activity ==
Workers' Compensation -The Illinois Chamber took the lead in the last 8 years to enact legislation to reform the workers' compensation system on behalf of employers across Illinois.
