= Lincoln Schatz =

American artist

- Born: 1963; Chicago, Illinois, United States
- Education: Bennington College
- Known for: Video art
- Notable work: CUBE portraits
- Awards: CORE Fellowship

Lincoln Schatz is a contemporary American artist, best known for works that utilize video to collect, store, and display images from specific environments.

== Career ==
His CUBE project combines architecture, video and, performance using a video system to generate painterly screen-based portraits of subjects. In 2008, the Hearst Corporation commissioned Schatz to create CUBE portraits to celebrate the 75th Anniversary of Esquire magazine. The work profiled the 75 most influential people of the 21st century including George Clooney, LeBron James, Jeff Bezos, and Craig Newmark. The series of portraits was acquired by the National Portrait Gallery in 2010.

In 2007, the Billingsley Company commissioned a new work for the entrance of One Arts Plaza in the heart of the Dallas’ Arts District. This large-scale video memory work features two video walls, totaling over 160 square feet (15 m^{2}). Schatz also completed commissions in that year for a new Helmut Jahn-designed high-rise in Chicago at 600 Fairbanks, and another for the entrance of Chicago's McCormick Place Convention Center.

== Commissioned works ==
Notable commissions include Qualcomm Corporate Headquarters in San Diego; Across Time, a permanent commission at the Spertus Institute of Jewish Studies in Chicago; and a work made for Shanghai contemporary art collector Pearl Lam. Work by Lincoln Schatz has been exhibited at bitforms gallery nyc and Seoul, the Hearst Tower, New York; Sundance Film Festival, Utah; Think 21 Contemporary, Brussels; PULSE Miami; ARCO Madrid; Catharine Clark Gallery, San Francisco, California; Gallery Simon, Seoul; Museum of Contemporary Art, San Diego; Quint Contemporary Art, La Jolla, California.

In THE NETWORK (Dec 2012, Collection of the National Portrait Gallery, http://thenetworkportrait.com/) Schatz examines contemporary American leadership. Schatz documents eighty-nine subjects who, coming from both sides of the political aisle, represent the sectors of government, business, science, and technology.

Filming each portrait via multiple cameras during a forty-five-minute conversation, Schatz captures his sitters as they discuss their legacies, accomplishments, and aspirations. Working with this footage, Schatz uses custom software that constantly recombines the video based on topic – the heart of what he refers to as "the generative portrait" process – and enables him to create a dynamic, continuously evolving representation of the similarities and differences between the sitters, free of editorial input.

Concurrently, Smithsonian Books published The Network: Portrait Conversations by Lincoln Schatz. http://thenetworkportrait.com/

His work is held in numerous public and private collections including, San Jose Museum of Art; Glatzova & Co., Prague; Cafritz Collection, Washington DC; Fundación Privada Sorigué, Lleida, Spain; Post Properties, Washington D.C.; Museum of Outdoor Arts, Englewood; City of Evanston, IL; Morse Diesel Construction, Chicago; Northern Industries, Chicago; Runnymede Sculpture Farm, Woodside; Ernesto Ventos Omedes, Barcelona; Fidelity Investment, Boston; and W Hotel, Seoul.

== Education ==
Schatz attended the Latin School of Chicago. He received his BA from Bennington College in 1986 and was the recipient of a CORE fellowship to the Glassell School of Art at the Museum of Fine Arts in Houston.
