= Ryan Blitstein =

American businessman and journalist (b. 1979)

Ryan Blitstein (born July 1979 in San Francisco, California) is executive director, Go-to-Market, at the enterprise software private equity firm Vista Equity Partners.

He was the first executive director of the education innovation grantmaking foundation SCE and is a former American journalist. He is also former President & CEO of CHANGE Illinois, whose mission is to bring fair, honest government to that state. He oversees the organization's strategy, operations, and development efforts on democracy issues including redistricting, campaign finance, and voting rights.

A graduate of Stanford University and the Columbia University Graduate School of Journalism, Blitstein has been a staff writer at Red Herring and SF Weekly and a contributing editor at the public policy magazine Pacific Standard. Blitstein's work has appeared in Time, The New York Times, The Denver Post, and The Seattle Times.

His most well-known article was a controversial story about craigslist.org, Craig Newmark, and citizen journalism that was both praised and ridiculed by bloggers, longshoremen, journalists, and media critics. He was also the first print journalist to write about Josh Wolf, the videoblogger jailed by a U.S. district court in 2006 for refusing to turn over a collection of videos he recorded during a protest. During 2006 and 2007, he was a business reporter at the San Jose Mercury News, which published his three-part investigative series on cybercrime, "Ghosts in the Browser," in November 2007. The project earned him a place as a Livingston Award finalist.
