= Jeff Berry (baseball agent) =

Sports agent and baseball executive

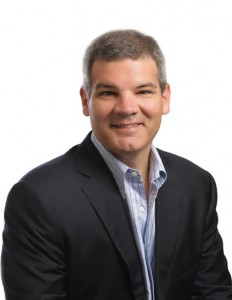
- Occupation: Senior Advisor to the President of Baseball Operations for the San Francisco Giants

Jeff Berry is a Senior Advisor to the President of Baseball Operations for the San Francisco Giants and a former longtime sports agent. Berry currently serves as a special advisor for the San Francisco Giants of Major League Baseball (MLB).

== Background ==
Berry was born in Owensboro, Kentucky. He attended the University of North Carolina at Charlotte, where he was a catcher on the baseball team. After graduating with a Bachelor of Science in business administration, Berry signed with the Boston Red Sox, and spent one season as a catcher in their minor league system. Following his playing career, Berry was a graduate assistant baseball coach at Oklahoma City University, from 1995 to 1998. While at OCU, he earned his Juris Doctor from the university's School of Law, graduating cum laude in May 1998.

== Sports agent career ==
Berry was a baseball agent from 1998 to 2024, most of that as longtime co-head of CAA Sports' Baseball division. Forbes ranked Berry as one of the world's most powerful sports agents.

Berry also had a record as a fierce advocate for players, writing a memo in 2018 that outlined strategies for players to empower themselves in the labor battle. Berry told ESPN.com, "As advocates, our job is to fight for and protect player rights, and when necessary, try and help create solutions -- not pointing fingers of blame and hoping things get better. And I wholeheartedly believe there are viable solutions to the core labor issues facing the game that can be remedied to the benefit of players, clubs and fans."

Relief pitcher Josh Hader, under Berry's guidance, set rules for his usage in the 2020–2024 seasons. It was a reaction to Hader's loss to the Milwaukee Brewers in salary arbitration, designed to protect his health and his value for his eventual free agency. Hader eventually signed with the Houston Astros for $95 million over five years, a record for a reliever.

Berry has been involved with multiple rule changes in baseball. Following Buster Posey's season-ending injury in May 2011, Berry lobbied Major League Baseball and the players' union to limit home-plate collisions, telling ESPN.com, "You leave players way too vulnerable. ... I don't know if this ends up leading to a rule change, but it should. The guy [at the plate] is too exposed. ... I'm going to call Major League Baseball and put this on the radar. Because it's just wrong." Eventually MLB added Rule 7.13 to protect catchers.

In 2014, word leaked that shortstop prospect Trea Turner was the player to be named in a trade between the San Diego Padres and Nationals but could not actually be traded, by rule, for six more months. Berry told foxsports.com, "Given the circumstances and the undoubtedly negative impact on Trea Turner, for the teams involved and Major League Baseball to endorse and approve this trade is not only unethical, but also goes against the very spirit of the Minor League Uniform Player Contract that players sign when they first enter professional baseball." In May 2015, MLB revised its rules and allowed players to be traded in the fall after they were drafted.

Berry resigned from CAA in 2024, saying he wanted to “make change” in baseball. He was a guest on numerous podcasts, calling attention to issues in the game.

On November 19, 2024, the Giants hired Berry as an advisor to Posey, their president of baseball operations.

== Personal ==
Berry and his wife Sarah have three children. Berry is a frequent speaker at colleges, law schools and other events. In 2022, Berry was named to the Board of Directors of the V Foundation for Cancer Research.

Berry, along with former MLB All-Star Jayson Werth., is a co-owner of the horse Flying Mohawk, who finished 18th in the 2025 Kentucky Derby, 12 1/2 lengths behind the winner.
