= Michael Ovitz =

American businessman (born 1946)

- Born: December 14, 1946 (age 79); Chicago, Illinois, U.S.
- Education: University of California, Los Angeles (BA)
- Occupation: Co-founder of the Creative Artists Agency
- Spouse: Judy Reich (m. 1969)
- Children: 3, including Kimberly

Michael Steven Ovitz (born December 14, 1946) is an American businessman. He was a talent agent who co-founded Creative Artists Agency (CAA) in 1975 and served as its chairman until 1995. Ovitz later served as president of The Walt Disney Company for 16 months, from October 1995 to January 1997.

== Early life and education ==
Ovitz was born to a Romanian Jewish family in Chicago, the son of a liquor wholesaler. Raised in Encino, Los Angeles, he was student body president at Birmingham High School in Van Nuys, a classmate of Sally Field and Michael Milken.

Ovitz graduated from the UCLA in 1968 with a bachelor's degree in psychology. While a student at UCLA and president of Zeta Beta Tau, he began his entertainment career as a part-time tour guide at Universal Studios.

== Career ==
After his graduation from UCLA, Ovitz secured a job in the mailroom at the William Morris Agency. From there, he left for law school but returned shortly (something William Morris normally did not allow). He was soon promoted, eventually becoming a highly successful television agent. Six years later, he and four other young colleagues left William Morris to found Creative Artists Agency.

=== Creative Artists Agency ===
Dissatisfied with his pay and promotion opportunities, Ovitz and fellow William Morris agents Ronald Meyer, William Haber, Rowland Perkins and Michael S. Rosenfeld planned to form their own agency after raising money. Learning of their plans, William Morris fired them in January 1975. Borrowing $21,000 from a bank, the agents rented a small office, conducting business on card tables and rented chairs, their wives taking turns as agency receptionist.

Ovitz reportedly had three new film packaging deals sold in the first week. Within four years CAA had $90.2 million in annual bookings and was the third-largest Hollywood agency. Under his direction, CAA quickly grew from a start-up organization to the world's leading talent agency, expanding from television into film, investment banking and advertising. Ovitz was known for assembling package deals, wherein CAA would utilize its talent base to provide directors, actors and screenwriters to a studio, thus shifting the negotiating leverage from the studios to the talent. As CAA rose in stature Ovitz became one of the most powerful men in Hollywood; he was so influential that, when The New York Times wrote about him in 1989, industry executives, directors, and actors refused to comment or would only do so if CAA allowed it.

Promoted to president then to chairman of the board, Ovitz's roles at CAA were numerous. He served as talent agent to Hollywood actors Tom Cruise, Dustin Hoffman, Kevin Costner, John Belushi, Michael Douglas, Bill Murray, Sylvester Stallone and Barbra Streisand as well as directors Steven Spielberg, Barry Levinson, and Sydney Pollack. He also provided corporate consulting services, helping negotiate several major international business mergers and deals including Matsushita's acquisition of MCA/Universal, the financial rescue of MGM/United Artists, and Sony's acquisition of Columbia Pictures. Ovitz's signing of Coca-Cola as a CAA client from agency McCann-Erickson had a significant impact on the advertising industry. He negotiated David Letterman's move from NBC to CBS, chronicled in the book The Late Shift: Letterman, Leno, and the Network Battle for the Night by Bill Carter. He disliked publicity, however, with the Times reporting that "Ovitz is one of the very few people in the world who own almost all the photographs ever taken of them".

=== Disney ===
Ovitz resigned from CAA in 1995 to become president of The Walt Disney Company under chairman Michael Eisner. Ovitz quickly grew frustrated with his role in the company and vague definition of duties. After a tumultuous year as Eisner's second in command, he was dismissed by Eisner in January 1997 and left Disney with a (previously agreed-upon) severance package valued at $38 million in cash and an estimated $100 million in stock.

Disney shareholders later sued Eisner and Disney's board of directors for awarding Ovitz such a large severance package. Later court proceedings reflect that Ovitz's stock options were granted when he was hired to induce him to join the company, not granted when he was fired. In 2005 the court upheld Disney's payment.

=== Artist Management Group and controversy ===
In January 1999, Ovitz formed CKE, comprising four distinct companies: Artist Management Group (AMG), Artist Production Group (APG), Artist Television Group (ATG) and Lynx Technology Group (LTG). In March 2002, APG lost its funding from StudioCanal. Later in 2002 Ovitz sold AMG to Jeff Kwatinetz for an undisclosed amount (reported to be around $12 million), which was merged into his management group The Firm.

After the sale of AMG, Ovitz became the subject of controversy for remarks made in a Vanity Fair interview, wherein he blamed the downfall of AMG upon a cabal led by DreamWorks cofounder David Geffen which Ovitz described as the "gay mafia". In addition to Geffen, the list included The New York Times correspondent Bernard Weinraub, Disney chairman (and former employer) Michael Eisner; Bryan Lourd, Kevin Huvane and Richard Lovett, partners at CAA, Universal Studios president Ronald Meyer (Ovitz's former partner at CAA); and Vivendi CEO Barry Diller. "If I were to establish the foundation of the negativity", Ovitz stated, "it all comes down to David Geffen and Bernie Weinraub. Everything comes back to those two. It's the same group [quoted] in every article." He later apologized for his Vanity Fair comments.

=== Venture investing ===
In 2010, Ovitz founded Broad Beach Ventures, a venture capital fund focused on technology investments. As of 2026, he was chairman of Gallery Ventures.

== Personal life ==
Ovitz acts as a private investor. Active in philanthropy, he donated $25 million in 1999 to spearhead fund raising efforts for UCLA's Medical Center, and has contributed significantly to numerous other philanthropic endeavors. A private investor and businessman, his notable activities have ranged from attempts to bring an NFL team to the Los Angeles Coliseum to ventures in online media.

Ovitz is considered among the world's top 200 art collectors. He owns works by Pablo Picasso, Jasper Johns, Willem de Kooning, Barnett Newman, Mark Rothko and many others.He bought his first serious work of art at the age of 25, paying $600 for a Jasper Johns print. He is featured in the 2021 documentary on Wolfgang Puck, Wolfgang, as one of the prominent food world figures influenced by Puck.

Ovitz married Judy Reich whom he met in college and they have three children, including New York fashion designer Kimberly Ovitz. Reich converted to Judaism.

In 2015, Ovitz became engaged to Tamara Mellon.

In June 2026 Ovitz stormed out of a deposition after being questioned about his relationship with Jeffrey Epstein.

== Books ==
Who is Michael Ovitz? was a memoir published by Michael Ovitz recounting his time at the Creative Artists Agency (CAA) and his brief stint at The Walt Disney Company.

Business positions
Preceded by Frank Wells	Disney Presidents; 1995–1997	Succeeded by Robert Iger
