= PJ Loughran =

American illustrator, musician, and entrepreneur

PJ Loughran (born October 4, 1973) is an American illustrator, musician and entrepreneur.

== Career ==
After graduating from the Parsons School of Design, Loughran began his career as in illustrator doing work for the Op-Ed pages of The New York Times. He has created over 3,000 illustrations for publications and publishers including ESPN, Coca-Cola, Nike, Foot Locker, Guitar World, The Village Voice, Time and Harper's Magazine.

Loughran is the former founder and CEO of Kerosene Creative Services, which he sold in 2009 to Manifest Digital. He served as Chief Creative Officer of Manifest Digital for two years. In 2012, he founded The Distillery, a Chicago/LA-based digital creative and social media agency.

In 2013, Loughran sold the Distillery to Superfly, best known as the co-founders of the Bonnaroo Music and Arts Festival in Manchester, TN and the Outside Lands festival in San Francisco, CA, where he is served as their Executive Creative Director and then President.

In 2019, Loughran left Superfly to start EMÁJYN, a VIP / executive hospitality firm specializing in high-end corporate experiences, with an emphasis on talent and behind-the-scenes access to entertainment and culture.

Since 2020, Loughran has founded and co-founded four additional new companies - QUARTERMASTER, a product incubation, branding and communications agency, FUNNY WATER, a low-abv flavored water brand, HELLBENT, a new premium canned cocktail brand in partnership with Robot Chicken creators Seth Green and Matthew Senreich, and FIFTH PLANE, an experiential brand partnership with Smashing Pumpkins drummer, Jimmy Chamberlin.

== Music ==
Loughran is also a musician and songwriter. Since 2001, he has completed seven albums, Grenadine in 2001, Sunrise Run in 2006, Spinning On in 2012 and McKinley and Miles in 2018 (produced by John Alagia.), "Davenport - Songs From Quarantine" in 2021, detailing his experiences during the COVID-19 pandemic, The Good Fight in 2023, his first self-produced full length record, and The Vocationist in 2025.

Loughran has toured and opened for many prominent artists, including Maroon 5, R.E.M, Johnny Lang, Martin Sexton, Taj Mahal, Todd Rundgren, REO Speedwagon, and The North Mississippi All-Stars.
