= Bryan Lourd =

American talent agent (born 1960)

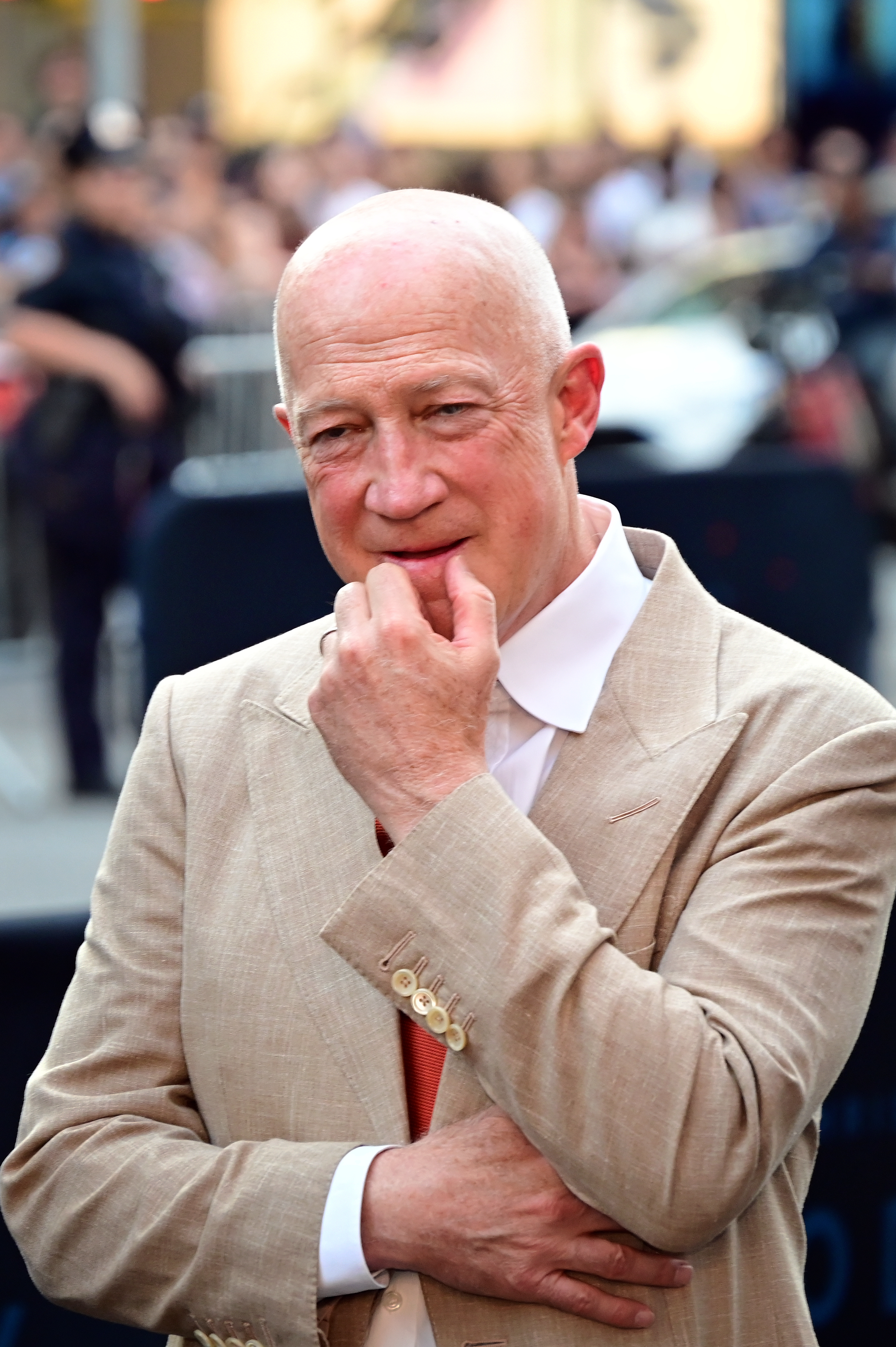
- Lourd in 2026
- Born: Bryan William Lourd; November 5, 1960 (age 65); New Iberia, Louisiana, U.S.
- Education: University of Southern California
- Occupations: Talent agent; business executive
- Organization: Creative Artists Agency
- Board member of: InterActiveCorp
- Spouse: Bruce Bozzi (m. 2016)
- Partner: Carrie Fisher (1990–1993)
- Children: 2, including Billie

Bryan William Lourd (born November 5, 1960) is an American talent agent. He is the CEO and co-chairman of Creative Artists Agency (CAA).

== Early life ==
Bryan William Lourd was born on November 5, 1960, in New Iberia, Louisiana, to Sherion (Brice) (1938-) and Harvey H. Lourd Jr. (1938–2011). He attended New Iberia Senior High School, and earned a degree from the USC Annenberg School for Communication and Journalism in 1982.

== Career ==
Lourd has been a partner, managing director and co-chairman of Creative Artists Agency (CAA) since October 1995. During the 2007–08 Writers Guild of America strike, he served as a mediator between Patric Verrone, the President of the Writers Guild of America, West and its legal counsel, David Young, and movie executive Peter Chernin and Bob Iger, the chairman and chief executive officer of The Walt Disney Company. In 2014, he was honored at a gala with many entertainers in New York City.

He has served on the board of directors of IAC, an online media company headed by Barry Diller, since 2005.

== Personal life ==
Lourd and actress Carrie Fisher were in a relationship from 1991 to 1994, during which time they identified themselves as a married couple. Their relationship ended when he left her for a man after realizing he was gay. They have a daughter, actress Billie Lourd, born in 1992.

Lourd married Bruce Bozzi, the former co-owner of The Palm (later owned by Landrys Restaurants), on October 12, 2016. Bozzi and Lourd legally adopted Bozzi's daughter, Ava. They divide their time between an apartment in the West Village, in New York City, and a house in Beverly Hills, California.

=== Philanthropy and public service ===
Lourd was elected to the board of trustees of the Los Angeles County Museum of Art in 2011. He serves on the board of directors of the Lincoln Center for the Performing Arts in New York City. He was appointed to the President's Committee on the Arts and Humanities in 2009 by President Barack Obama and to the board of the John F. Kennedy Center for the Performing Arts in 2015. He attended the Allen & Company Sun Valley Conference in 2013.
