= Ronald Meyer =

American entertainment executive

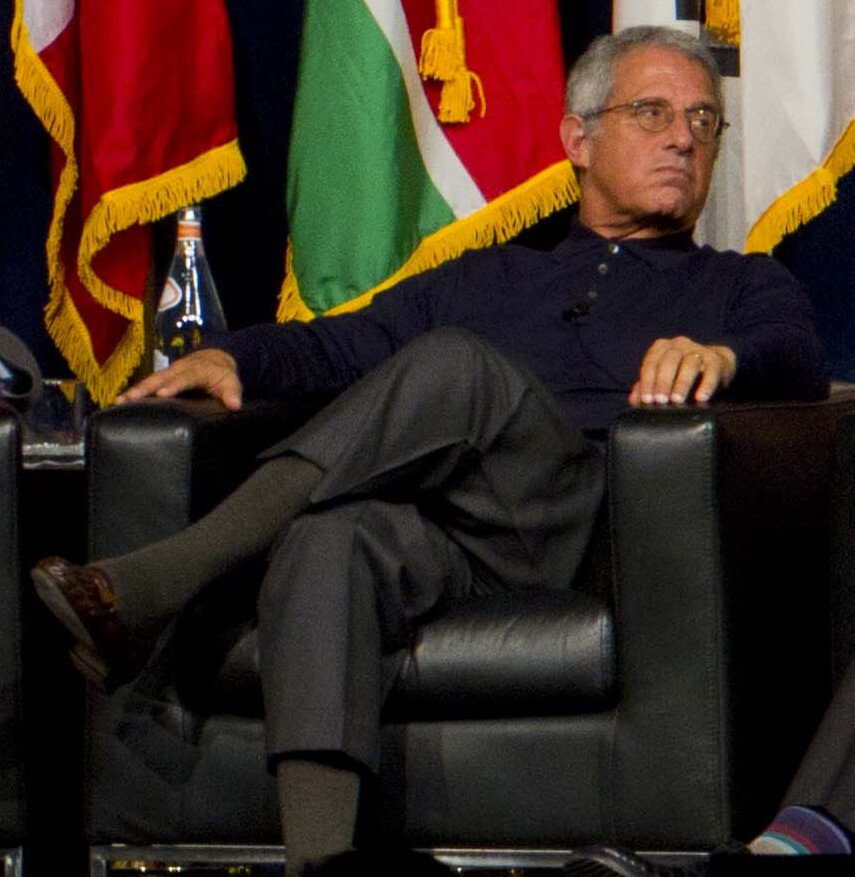
- Meyer in 2012
- Born: September 25, 1944 (age 82); Los Angeles, California, U.S.
- Occupations: Agent; executive
- Years active: 1964–present
- Employer(s): Paul Kohner Agency (1964–1970); William Morris Agency (1970–1975); Universal Studios (1995–2013); Vivendi Universal Entertainment (2002–2004); NBCUniversal (2013–2020); Wild Bunch (2021–present)
- Known for: Founding Creative Artists Agency, and helming Universal Studios for 25 years
- Spouse(s): Ellen Meyer; Kelly Chapman
- Children: 4, including Jennifer

Ronald Meyer (born September 25, 1944) is an American entertainment executive and former talent agent. He co-founded Creative Artists Agency in 1975, and served as president and chief operating officer at Universal Studios from 1995–2013, and president and chief operating officer of Vivendi Universal Entertainment from 2002–2004. He was then promoted to vice chairman of NBCUniversal at Comcast Corp. and held that position until his resignation in 2020. He is currently the CEO of Wild Bunch, and an advisor to the Doha Film Institute.

== Early life ==
Meyer was born on September 25, 1944, in Los Angeles, to Jewish immigrant parents who escaped Nazi Germany in 1939. His father worked as a traveling dress salesman. His family's love for film influenced him at an early age. At 15 Meyer dropped out of high school, and at 17 he joined the United States Marine Corps, where he served until he was 19. While in the Marine Corps, his mother sent him The Flesh Peddlers, a novel about the talent industry by Stephen Longstreet. The book inspired him to pursue a career as a talent agent after his service ended in 1963. He worked as an agent for the Paul Kohner Agency in Los Angeles from 1964 to 1970, and from 1970 to 1975 for the William Morris Agency.

== Career ==
=== Creative Artists Agency (1974–1995) ===
At a lunch in 1974, Meyer and some friends came up with the idea of starting an agency to represent talent in Los Angeles. They opened Creative Artists Agency in a rented office with card tables, folding chairs, and their wives as the secretaries. It later expanded its range of services to include consulting with corporations.

Over the years, the company developed into the preeminent talent agency, representing many of the industry’s most influential talent, and later expanding its range of services to include consulting with leading American and international corporations. Meyer later reflected that "There wasn’t one day where it exploded, it just grew and grew and grew." Meyer was president of CAA for 20 years, before heading to NBCUniversal.

=== NBCUniversal (1995–2020) ===
[My] proudest achievement is that we didn’t fall apart. It is a testament to the people here. Not only did we stay together, the company, in the past two years, has enjoyed the greatest successes we have ever had. I am proud to be a part of that. — Interview with the National Museum of American History

Meyer served as the President & COO of Universal Studios (formerly MCA) from August 1995 until September 2013. As President and Chief Operating Officer, he oversaw the worldwide operations for film, theme parks and the physical studio which had 15,000 employees. He was succeeded as president by Jeff Shell. In September 2013, Meyer was promoted to Vice Chairman of Universal Studios' parent company, NBCUniversal.

Meyer had the longest studio reign in the history of Hollywood, and was the longest-serving chief of a major motion picture company. During his 25 years at Universal, the company underwent six ownership changes. The studio experienced a high level of success during his tenure, releasing an average of 17 films a year, of which over 40 achieved worldwide box-office success by grossing over $200 million, including Erin Brockovich (2000), Meet the Parents (2000), The Fast and the Furious (2001), 8 Mile (2002), Despicable Me (2010) and Ted (2012). Nine Universal films were nominated for the best picture Oscar during his tenure, with three winners including Shakespeare in Love (1998), Gladiator (2000), and A Beautiful Mind (2001). In a 2020, Meyer stated that the three NBCUniversal films he was most proud of were Brokeback Mountain (2005), United 93 (2006), and Apollo 13 (1995), because of their historical and social impact.

Throughout his career, Meyer built strong relationships with actors and filmmakers such as Jimmy Fallon, Dwayne Johnson, Jason Blum, Chris Meledandri, Angelina Jolie, Kevin Hart and Julia Roberts, and bringing them to Universal for both roles and overall production deals. His relationships with filmmakers such as Meledandri, Steven Spielberg, Peter Jackson, and Michael Bay, brought several large IPs to Universal Theme Parks. Meyer convinced Warner Bros. to license the Harry Potter franchise for Universal theme parks. The Wizarding World of Harry Potter has since become Universal theme park's biggest attraction.

In August 2020, he stepped down from his role as Vice Chairman after he admitted to an affair with an unnamed woman and claimed he was being extorted. The woman was revealed to be Charlotte Kirk.

=== Wild Bunch ===
On November 15, 2021, it was announced that Meyer along with Sophie Jordan are CEO and co-CEO of Wild Bunch AG, a pan-European independent film distribution and production services company. Meyer also serves as an advisor to the Doha Film Institute (DFI) as Qatar continues to grow in the film business.

== Awards and honours ==
Meyer has been recognized for his contributions to the American film and television industry. In 2000, he was awarded the Motion Picture Showmanship Award from the Publicists Guild of America. He received the Producers Guild of America Milestone Award in 2007. In 2018, National Museum of American History interviewed Meyer about his life and career as part of its "The American Scene" project, about the history of American entertainment.

== Personal life ==
Meyer lives in Malibu, California.

Preceded by Sidney Sheinberg	Universal Studios Presidents; 1995–2013	Succeeded by Jeff Shell
