= List of novels set in Crete =

This is a list of notable novels set in Crete:

- The Colossus of Maroussi — Henry Miller (1941)
- The Sea Eagle — James Aldridge (1944)
- The Egyptian — Mika Waltari (1945)
- Zorba the Greek — Nikos Kazantzakis (1946)
- Ill Met by Moonlight — W. Stanley Moss (1950)
- A War of Shadows — W. Stanley Moss (1952)
- Captain Michalis — Nikos Kazantzakis (1955)
- The Cretan Runner — George Psychoundakis (1955)
- Dark Labyrinth — Lawrence Durrell (1958)
- The King Must Die — Mary Renault (1958)
- The Moon-Spinners — Mary Stewart (1962)
- Cast In Doubt — Lynne Tillman (1992)
- Der kretisches Gast — Klaus Modick (2003)
- You Are Here — Steve Horsfall (2004)
- The Innocent and the Guilty — Maro Douka (2004)
- The Island — Victoria Hislop (2005)
- The Memory of Tides — Angelo Loukakis (2006)
- Wish You Were Here — Mike Gayle (2007)
- The Tomb of Zeus — Barbara Cleverly (2007)
- Blood of Honour — James Holland (2010)
- The Sword (Volume 1) — Luna Brothers (2010)
- Digging at the Crossroads of Time — Christos Morris (2012)
- "The Theseus Code" - Marc Hammond (1981)
- "Korakas" - Anne Holloway (2015)
- "The Threshing Circle" - Neil Grimmett (2014)
- "Knossos" - Laura Gill (2014)
- “Kritsotopoula: Girl of Krista” - Yvonne Payne (2015)
- Lies that bind us-Andrew Hart
