= Ill Met by Moonlight (film) =

1957 British film by Powell and Pressburger

Ill Met by Moonlight (Night Ambush)
- theatrical poster
- Directed by: Michael Powell; Emeric Pressburger
- Written by: W. Stanley Moss (book); Michael Powell; Emeric Pressburger
- Produced by: Michael Powell; Emeric Pressburger
- Starring: Dirk Bogarde; Marius Goring; David Oxley; Cyril Cusack
- Cinematography: Christopher Challis
- Edited by: Arthur Stevens
- Music by: Mikis Theodorakis
- Production companies: The Archers; Rank Organisation Film Productions
- Distributed by: The Rank Organisation
- Release dates: 4 March 1957 (UK); 24 April 1958 (NYC); July 1958 (U.S.)
- Running time: 104 minutes 93 minutes (U.S.)
- Country: United Kingdom
- Language: English
- Budget: £212,091

Ill Met by Moonlight (1957), released in the US as Night Ambush (which is eleven minutes shorter than the British release), is a film by the British writer-director-producer team of Michael Powell and Emeric Pressburger, and the last movie they made together through their production company "The Archers". The film, which stars Dirk Bogarde and features Marius Goring, David Oxley, and Cyril Cusack, is based on the 1950 book Ill Met by Moonlight: The Abduction of General Kreipe by W. Stanley Moss, which is an account of events during the author's service on Crete during World War II as an agent of the Special Operations Executive (SOE). The title is a quotation from Shakespeare's A Midsummer Night's Dream, and the book features the young agents' capture and evacuation of the German general Heinrich Kreipe.

== Plot ==
During World War II, the Greek island of Crete is occupied by the Nazis. British officers Major Patrick Leigh Fermor DSO and Captain Bill Stanley Moss MC of the Special Operations Executive (SOE) land on the island and meet other British agents and members of the Cretan resistance. In April 1944, they kidnap General Kreipe, the German commander of the island's occupying forces and, in disguise, drive his car through a number of German checkpoints until they abandon it and set off on foot with the General.

Travelling mainly by night across mountainous territory, the group has to evade surveillance by German search parties looking for the General, but is given assistance by townspeople and other resistance partisans. Along the way, Kreipe seems to be resigned to having to cooperate, but he leaves personal tokens at several stops as clues for searchers to follow. He also feigns an injury to his shoulder to slow down the group's progress. After a final push to reach a secluded cove on the far side of the island where they are to be picked up by the Royal Navy, the group finds the area occupied by German troops.

Kreipe offers Niko, a young boy travelling with the group, a gold coin, telling him that if he goes down to the beach, he will get a pair of German jackboots. The British officers ask the child to deliver a message to local partisans. Niko seems to fall for the ruse. The group watches the shore from above and sees him go into the German camp. Kreipe, exulting, tells the British they are foolish for trusting Cretan "barbarians". He tells them he bribed the boy. But instead of heading up the hills to engage with the British and retrieve the General, the Germans march off. Fermor tells Kreipe that they are heading into a partisan ambush.

The British and Cretans, along with Kreipe arrive at the beach and are joined by the partisans. The general removes the sling. On board the British ship that is to transport them to Cairo, the Middle East headquarters of British forces, Fermor and Moss return the gold coin he gave Niko, who is going to safety with them. They also return the items that the General planted during their trek, comparing them to the "breadcrumbs" left by Hansel in the story of Hansel and Gretel and the Cretan Resistance, once disdained by the General, to the "birds" who take the breadcrumbs in the story. Kreipe compliments them on the professionalism of their mission. On deck, Niko sings "Filedem" while proudly polishing his new German jackboots.

== Cast ==
- Dirk Bogarde as Major Patrick "Paddy" Leigh Fermor aka "Philedem"
- Marius Goring as Major General Heinrich Kreipe
- David Oxley as Captain W. Stanley "Billy" Moss, M.C.
- Dimitri Andreas as Niko Soldan Emeris
- Cyril Cusack as Captain Sandy Rendel
- Laurence Payne as Manoli
- Wolfe Morris as George
- Michael Gough as Andoni Zoidakis
- John Cairney as Elias
- Rowland Bartrop as Micky Akoumianakis
- Brian Worth as Stratis Saviolkis
- Paul Stassino as Yanni Katsias
- Adeeb Assaly as Zahari

Cast notes:

- Marius Goring had appeared in three other Powell and Pressburger films: The Spy in Black (1939), A Matter of Life and Death (1946) and The Red Shoes (1948). Goring replaced Curt Jürgens, who was the original choice to play the part of General Kreipe.
- Christopher Lee and David McCallum have small parts: Lee as a German officer in the dentist scene, and McCallum, in his film debut, as a sailor on the ship that picks up the group. Lee's part was edited out of the 1959 American re-release of the film. The "John Houseman" in the cast is not the well-known actor and director John Houseman. but SOE agent Lt. John Houseman, who plays himself.

== Production ==
Emeric Pressburger had read and bought the rights to W. Stanley Moss's book in 1950, but production would not begin for another six years. Following the success of The Battle of the River Plate (1956, American title: Pursuit of the Graf Spee), The Archers agreed to a one-film contract with the Rank Organisation, but disagreements between Powell and Pressburger over that contract and aspects of the film production contributed to the final breakup of The Archers as a production company.

In Million Dollar Movie (1992), the second volume of Michael Powell's memoirs, he describes Ill Met by Moonlight as one of The Archers' "greatest failures," despite the film's financial success. Part of his unhappiness is attributed to Pressburger's screenplay, but he also describes conflicts with Rank's studio bosses over casting, film format, and locations. Dirk Bogarde was eventually cast as Fermor, despite Powell's misgivings, and the filming was done in VistaVision but in black-and-white. Cyprus was experiencing armed insurgency at the time, so filming took place at Pinewood Studios in England, with location shooting in the Alpes-Maritimes in France and Italy, and on the Côte d'Azur in France. Both Patrick Leigh Fermor and Xan Fielding were present on the location shots in Alpes-Maritime as advisors. The movie's score by Greek composer Mikis Theodorakis, who had been raised on the island of Crete, was his first for motion pictures. Watching the movie again years later, Powell complained that he "was surprised by how bad the film was," happy or at least content with the setting and music but especially disappointed in the performances of the lead actors and his own direction, which "concentrated so much on creating a Greek atmosphere that Michael Powell had no time, or invention for anything else."

Although Powell was especially unhappy with Bogarde's performance, Patrick Leigh Fermor expressed great satisfaction with Bogarde's representation of him.

== Box office ==
The film was the seventh most popular movie at the British box office in 1957.

According to Kinematograph Weekly the film was "in the money" at the British box office in 1957.

Filmink argued the movie "doesn’t have the reputation of a decent movie, in part because director Michael Powell complained about it so much over the years – but it was one of the most popular films of the year. Powell’s memory might have been stained because the shoot led to so many fights with the director splitting up with not only Emeric Pressburger, but also Rank."

== In popular culture ==
The story was affectionately parodied by Spike Milligan in the 1957 Goon Show episode, "Ill Met by Goonlight".

== See also ==
- They Who Dare
- Sophie Moss
- Patrick Leigh Fermor
