= Friedrich-Wilhelm Müller =

German Wehrmacht general (1897–1947)

- Müller in 1944
- Born: 29 August 1897; Barmen, Kingdom of Prussia, German Empire
- Died: 20 May 1947 (aged 49); Athens, Kingdom of Greece
- Cause of death: Execution by firing squad
- Military career
- Allegiance: German Empire; Weimar Republic; Nazi Germany
- Branch: Imperial German Army; Reichswehr; German Army
- Service years: 1915–1945
- Rank: General der Infanterie
- Nickname: The Butcher of Crete
- Commands: 22nd Air Landing Division
- Conflicts: World War I; World War II; Dodecanese Campaign
- Awards: Knight's Cross of the Iron Cross with Oak Leaves and Swords

Friedrich-Wilhelm Müller (29 August 1897 – 20 May 1947) was a general in the Wehrmacht of Nazi Germany during World War II. He led an infantry regiment in the early stages of the war and by 1943 was commander of the 22nd Air Landing Division. Under his orders, troops of the division committed atrocities against Greek civilians. He was later commander of occupied Crete and his harsh methods of controlling the island saw him nicknamed "The Butcher of Crete." After the war he was convicted and executed by a Greek court for war crimes.

== Biography ==
Müller was born in Barmen, Prussia. When World War I began, Friedrich-Wilhelm Müller served as an infantryman with the 2nd Infantry Regiment. In 1915, he was promoted to second lieutenant and transferred to the 266th Regiment. After the war, Müller remained in the army and continued to rise through the ranks, attaining the rank of major in 1936. Shortly after World War II commenced, Müller was promoted to lieutenant colonel.

As the commanding officer of 105th Infantry Regiment, he saw action against the Soviet Army, for which he was awarded the Knight's Cross of the Iron Cross in 1941 and Oak Leaves to his Knight's Cross in 1942. In August 1942, Müller was appointed commanding officer of 22nd Air Landing Division. Müller became notorious as a brutal commander responsible for several atrocities against Greek civilians.

The attacks on civilians included the massacres at Viannos, Anogeia, Amari, Damasta, Skourvoula and Malathyros. During the autumn of 1943, Müller led the German forces in their victory over the Italian-British forces in the Dodecanese Campaign. On 6 October 1943, on the island of Kos, under his orders, German forces killed and buried in mass graves over one hundred Italian army officers captured at the end of the battle for the island, who would not side with their former allies.

In 1943, Captain William Stanley Moss, a recent British Special Operations Executive (SOE) recruit and Major Patrick Leigh Fermor, an officer of SOE Cairo's Cretan Desk, hatched a plan for the abduction of Müller. The plan received widespread support in SOE's Cairo branch. However, on 1 March, Müller was replaced by Major General Heinrich Kreipe who was eventually abducted instead of Müller in April 1944. On 1 July 1944, Müller returned to his role of commander of Fortress Crete, replacing Bruno Bräuer, and was determined to penalise the locals for providing shelter to the Kreipe abduction team, confirming British fears of mass reprisals. His brutal response earned him the nickname of "The Butcher of Crete."

Müller was also responsible for the Holocaust of Kedros on 22 August 1944. Under his orders, German infantry killed 164 Greek civilians which was followed in the coming days by the razing of most villages, looting, and the destruction of livestock and harvests. By 1945, Müller commanded the German 4th Army on the Eastern Front. Müller ended the war in East Prussia where he surrendered to the Red Army.

After the war, he was tried by a Greek military court for war crimes. In 1946, Müller was convicted by a court in Athens for the massacres of hostages for reprisals. He was sentenced to death on 9 December 1946 and executed by firing squad on 20 May 1947, along with former General Bruno Bräuer, on the anniversary of the Axis invasion of Crete.

== Awards ==
- Iron Cross (1914) 1st Class (25 May 1916) & 2nd Class (29 August 1916)
- Clasp to the Iron Cross (1939) 1st Class (22 December 1939) & 2nd Class (12 June 1940)
- German Cross in Gold on 18 June 1943 as Generalleutnant and commander of the 22. Infanterie-Division
- Knight's Cross of the Iron Cross with Oak Leaves and Swords
  - Knight's Cross on 22 September 1941 as Oberstleutnant and commander of Infanterie-Regiment 105
  - 86th Oak Leaves on 8 April 1942 as Oberst and commander of Infanterie-Regiment 105
  - 128th Swords on 27 January 1945 as General der Infanterie and commanding general of the LXVIII. Armeekorps

== See also ==
- Viannos massacres
- Holocaust of Kedros
- Razing of Anogeia
- Massacre of Kos
- Kidnapping of Heinrich Kreipe

Military offices
Preceded by General der Infanterie Ludwig Wolff	Commander of 22. Infanterie-Division; 1 August 1942 – 15 February 1944	Succeeded by Generalmajor Heinrich Kreipe
Preceded by Generalleutnant Hermann Böhme	Commander of V. Armeekorps; 4 May 1944 – 2 June 1944	Succeeded by General der Infanterie Dr. Franz Beyer
Preceded by Generalleutnant Edgar Röhricht	Commander of LIX. Armeekorps; 2 June 1944 – 8 June 1944	Succeeded by General der Infanterie Edgar Röhricht
Preceded by Generalleutnant Bruno Bräuer	Commander of Fortress Crete; 1 July 1944 – 18 September 1944	Succeeded by Generalleutnant Ernst Klepp
Preceded by None	Commander of XXXIV. Armeekorps; 13 November 1944 – 8 December 1944	Succeeded by General der Flieger Hellmuth Felmy
Preceded by General der Flieger Hellmuth Felmy	Commander of LXVIII. Armeekorps; 8 december 1944 - 27 january 1945	Succeeded by Generalleutnant Arthur Schwarzenecker
Preceded by General der Infantrie Friedrich Hoßbach	Commander of 4. Armee; 29 January 1945 – 27 April 1945	Succeeded by none
