= Ill Met by Moonlight =

Non-fiction book by W. Stanley Moss

Ill Met By Moonlight
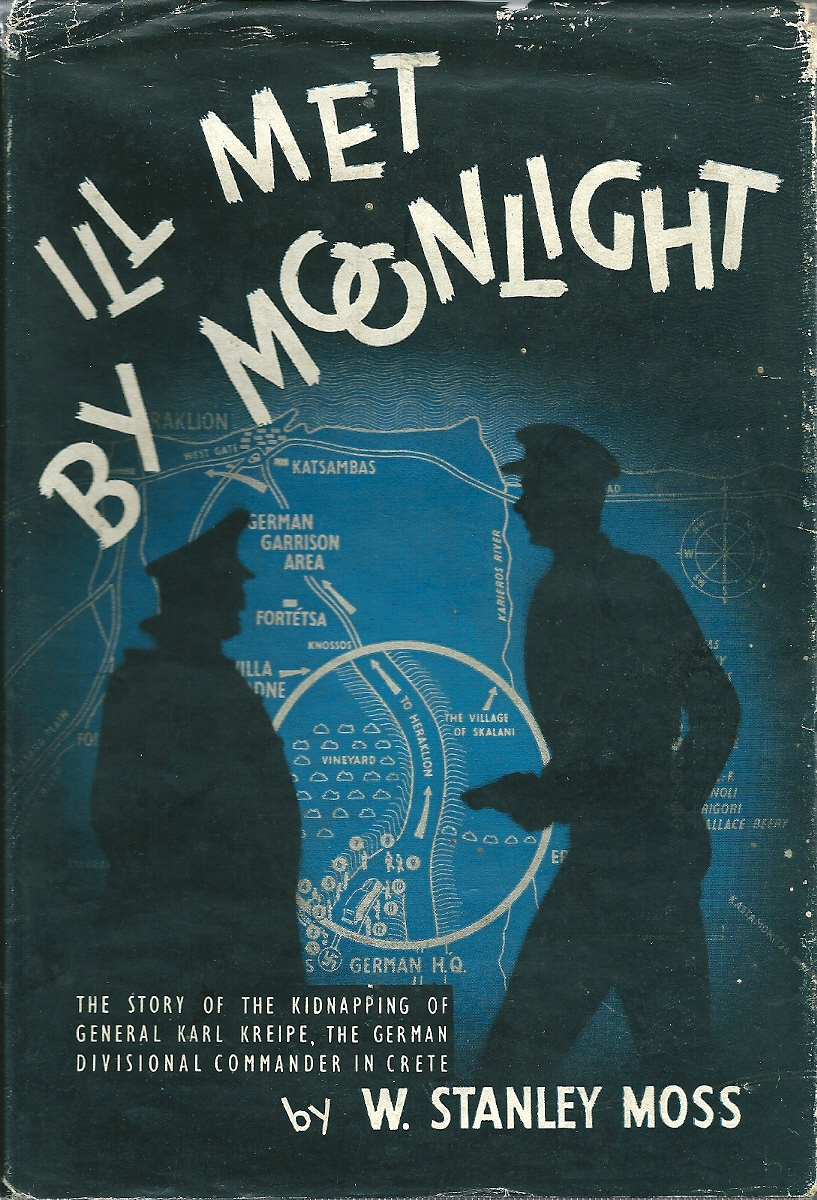
- Ill Met by Moonlight - first edition cover
- Author: W. Stanley Moss
- Language: English
- Genre: War
- Publisher: George G. Harrap and Co.
- Publication date: 1950
- Media type: Print (Hardback & Paperback)
- Pages: 190
- ISBN: 978-1-7802-2623-1
- Followed by: A War of Shadows

Ill Met by Moonlight: The Abduction of General Kreipe is a non-fiction partly-autobiographical book written by W. Stanley Moss, a British soldier, writer and traveller. It describes an operation in Crete during the Second World War to capture German general Heinrich Kreipe. Moss kept a diary during the war years and based his book on it. The 2014 edition includes an introduction by one of Moss's children and an afterword by Patrick Leigh Fermor.

The story was made into a 1957 film with the same title starring Dirk Bogarde by the British writer-director-producer team of Michael Powell and Emeric Pressburger.

== Development and publication ==
The book recounts Moss's service, alongside Patrick Leigh Fermor, as an agent of Special Operations Executive (SOE), including their kidnapping of Heinrich Kreipe, commander of 22. Luftlande-Division (22nd Air Landing Division) on German-occupied Crete, and Kreipe's removal to Cairo for intelligence and propaganda purposes.

While the manuscript was completed in early 1945, its publication was initially blocked by the head of SOE, Major-General Sir Colin Gubbins, an instruction relayed by Colin Mackenzie (BB100), commander of Force 136.

It was first published in 1950, when it was selected by W. Somerset Maugham as one of the best three books of that year: "more thrilling than any detective story I can remember, and written in a modest and most engaging manner". The book was reprinted twice in both February and March 1950 and again in June that year. The book was chosen to lead the BBC radio series Now it can be told of 1950. It has been republished many times since and remains in print. The book has been translated into Spanish, Italian, Greek, and Hebrew.

The title is a quotation from Shakespeare's A Midsummer Night's Dream (Act 2, Scene 1, Line 60).

Moss's second book, A War of Shadows, describes the aftermath of Ill Met by Moonlight, a subsequent raid on Crete and operations in mainland Greece and Thailand (against Japanese forces).

== Summary ==
In May 1941, German forces attacked and occupied Crete. Allied forces were driven back and evacuated to North Africa by June. The Special Operations Executive (SOE) inserted agents on Crete in order to work with the local resistance in harrying German occupying forces.

On 4 February 1944, Major Patrick Leigh Fermor and Captain William Stanley Moss and two Cretan SOE agents left Egypt by plane for Crete. Their intention was to parachute into Crete but after arriving at the drop zone, only Leigh Fermor was able to parachute successfully. The others had to abandon the attempt due to bad weather and were returned to Egypt. On landing Leigh Fermor was met by a group from the Cretan resistance, with whom he remained until the arrival of the rest of the SOE team. After three more attempts at a parachute jump over a two-month period, Moss and the other two arrived by Motor Launch ML 842 on 4 April 1944. They were met on the beach by Leigh Fermor and another SOE agent, Sandy Rendel.

Their target General Müller was replaced by General Kreipe just before they arrived. The team decided to proceed with the plan to abduct the German commanding officer. The SOE team included a number of Cretans; 'Anthony' (Antonis Papaleonidas), 'Micky' (Michalis Akoumianakis) and Grigorios Chnarakis. Micky was especially welcome as his house was opposite Kreipe's residence, the Villa Ariadne, in the village of Knossos. The team reconnoitred the area and planned the abduction. Dressed as a Cretan shepherd, Leigh Fermor travelled on the local bus to check Knossos and the area around the German headquarters. He decided that the German headquarters would be too difficult to penetrate. After a few days of alternately observing the actions of the General, they finalized the details of the abduction. The plan was for the two British officers, dressed as corporals in the Feldgendarmerie (German military police), to stop the general's car on his way home at what was supposed to be a routine check point.

On the night of 26 April 1944, the two British officers stopped the General's car before the Villa Ariadne. When the car stopped, Leigh Fermor took care of Kreipe and Moss knocked the driver out with his cosh. Moss drove the team and the General in the General's car for an hour and a half through 22 controlled road blocks in Heraklion before leaving Leigh Fermor to abandon the car. When Leigh Fermor left the car, he also left documents revealing that the kidnapping had been done by British Commandos so that no reprisals should be taken against the local population.

With his Cretan escorts, Moss set off with the General across country to a rendezvous where they would be joined by Leigh Fermor. Hunted by German patrols, the group moved across the mountains to reach the southern side of the island, where a British motor launch (ML 842 commanded by Brian Coleman) was to pick them up. On 14 May 1944, the SOE team and the general were finally picked up from a beach near Rodakino, possibly Peristeres beach, on the southern side of the island. They were transported to safety, landing at Mersa Matruh in Egypt.

After the war, a member of Kreipe’s staff reported how, on hearing the news of the kidnapping, an uneasy silence in the officers' mess in Heraklion was followed by, “Well gentlemen, I think this calls for champagne all round.” Post War correspondence explains that Kreipe was disliked by his soldiers because, amongst other things, he objected to the stopping of his own vehicle for checking in compliance with his commands concerning approved travel orders. This tension between the General and his troops, in part, explains the caution of sentries in considering stopping the General’s car as Moss drove it through Heraklion.

The book was due to be published in Germany in 1950. Kreipe alleged that he had never given his parole not to shout or to try to escape to Moss and Leigh Fermor as described by Moss in the book. Kreipe secured an injunction preventing publication of the book in Germany on the grounds that the statement in the book was untrue. Leigh Fermor's report after the operation and the publication of his account of the abduction published in 2015 both corroborated Moss's version of events.

== See also ==
- Sophie Moss
