= 22nd Air Landing Division =

22nd Infantry Division 22nd Air Landing Division 22nd Infantry Division 22nd Volksgrenadier Division
- 22. Infanterie-Division; 22. Luftlande-Division; 22. Infanterie-Division; 22. Volksgrenadier-Division
- Active: 15 October 1935 – 8 May 1945
- Country: Nazi Germany
- Branch: Army
- Type: Fallschirmjäger
- Size: Division
- Garrison/HQ: Bremen

Commanders
- Notable commanders: Friedrich-Wilhelm Müller; Heinrich Kreipe

The 22nd Infantry Division, which later became the 22nd Air Landing Division, was a specialized German infantry division in World War II. Its primary method of transportation was gliders. The division played a significant role in the development of modern day air assault operations. Towards the end of the war, the formation was reshaped into the 22nd Volksgrenadier Division.

== History ==
Created as 22nd Infantry Division in 1935. The 16th regiment participated in the 1939 Invasion of Poland; the rest of the division stayed in garrison on the Siegfried Line in case of a French attack in defense of Poland. The division retrained as 22nd Air Landing Division for rapid tactical deployment to capture enemy airbases and performed in that role during the invasion of the Netherlands suffering heavy losses during the failed Battle for The Hague (operation “Fall Festung”), and afterward advanced into France operating as ordinary ground infantry. Though planned for use in its air-landing role for the Battle of Crete, it was replaced by another division at the last minute. It joined Army Group South in Operation Barbarossa (1941), attacking from Romania and, operating exclusively as ordinary ground infantry, helped storm Sevastopol in the Crimea (1942).

From January to April 1942, the division was engaged in positional warfare outside Sevastopol and, starting on 8 May 1942, took part in the fighting to retake the Kerch Peninsula. In June 1942, it participated in the assault on Sevastopol. Following the conclusion of hostilities, the division was transferred to Greece, where it underwent refitting in the Athens and Thessaloniki areas. Under an order from the General Army Office dated 29 July 1942, the division was to be reorganized for an airborne role, receiving the additional designation "(L. L. motorisiert trop.)" [Airborne, motorized, tropical]; this process also entailed the reorganization of its constituent units. The airborne designation was rescinded on 1 October 1942, and the division was subsequently reorganized for deployment to Crete. In November 1942, the division deployed to the island of Crete, where it remained until September 1944.

The unit was thereafter transferred to Crete for garrison duty in "Fortress Crete" and mop-up operations in the Aegean, playing a major role in the Battle of Leros under the command of Generalmajor Friedrich-Wilhelm Müller.

On 26 April 1944 the divisional commander, Generalmajor Heinrich Kreipe, was abducted by a British Special Operations Executive team led by Major Patrick Leigh Fermor and Captain W. Stanley Moss. Kreipe's car was ambushed at night on the way from the divisional headquarters at Ano Archanes to the Villa Ariadne at Knossos and he was taken cross-country over the mountains to the south coast where he and his captors were picked up by a British vessel near Rodakino on 14 May. This operation was later portrayed in the book Ill Met by Moonlight (1950) written by Moss based on his wartime diaries, later adapted as a film of the same name. In late summer 1944, forces of the division were involved in more atrocities in Anogeia and Amari.

Withdrawn to the mainland in autumn 1944, the 22. Infanterie-Division spent the rest of the war in anti-partisan operations in Macedonia, Serbia and Bosnia and Herzegovina in southeastern Europe, was renamed 22. Volksgrenadier-Division in March 1945, as it withdrew to Slavonia and finally surrendered to Yugoslav forces at the end of the war in May in Slovenia.

== War crimes ==
Troops from the Division killed hundreds of Cretan civilians in massacres during the occupation of the island, including at Viannos and Kedros, and the execution of Italian prisoners of War on Kos. General der Infanterie Friedrich-Wilhelm Müller was executed in 1947 in Greece for war crimes committed during the Division's time in Crete.

== Commanders ==
- Generalleutnant Adolf Strauß (15 Oct 1935 – 10 Nov 1938)
- Generalleutnant Hans Graf von Sponeck (10 Nov 1938 – 10 Oct 1941)
- General der Infanterie Ludwig Wolff (10 Oct 1941 – 1 Aug 1942)
- General der Infanterie Friedrich-Wilhelm Müller (1 Aug 1942 – 15 Feb 1944)
- Generalmajor Heinrich Kreipe (15 Feb 1944 – 26 Apr 1944)
- Generalleutnant Helmut Friebe (1 May 1944 – 15 April 1945)
- Generalmajor Gerhard Kühne (16 April 1945 – 15 May 1945)

== Orders of Battle ==
=== May 1940 – Fall Gelb ===
- Divisionstab
- Infanterie-Regiment 16
- Infanterie-Regiment 47
- Infanterie-Regiment 65
- Artillerie-Regiment 22
- Panzerabwehr-Abteilung 22
- Aufklärungs-Abteilung 22
- Feldersatz-Bataillon 22
- Nachrichten-Bataillon 22
- Pionier-Bataillon 22

=== July 1944 – Crete ===
- Divisionstab
- Grenadier-Regiment 16
- Grenadier-Regiment 47
- Grenadier-Regiment 65
- Artillerie-Regiment 22
- Panzerjäger-Abteilung 22
- Aufklärungs-Abteilung 22
- Feldersatz-Bataillon 22
- Nachrichten-Bataillon 22
- Pionier-Bataillon 22
- Flak-Bataillon 22

== Bibliography ==
- Burkhard Müller-Hillebrand (1969). Das Heer 1933-1945. Entwicklung des organisatorischen Aufbaues (in German). Vol. III: Der Zweifrontenkrieg. Das Heer vom Beginn des Feldzuges gegen die Sowjetunion bis zum Kriegsende. Frankfurt am Main: Mittler. p. 286.
- Georg Tessin (1970). Verbände und Truppen der deutschen Wehrmacht und Waffen-SS im Zweiten Weltkrieg, 1939 - 1945 (in German). Vol. IV: Die Landstreitkräfte 15 -30. Frankfurt am Main: Mittler.
