= Damasta sabotage =

World War II ambush near Damasta, Greece

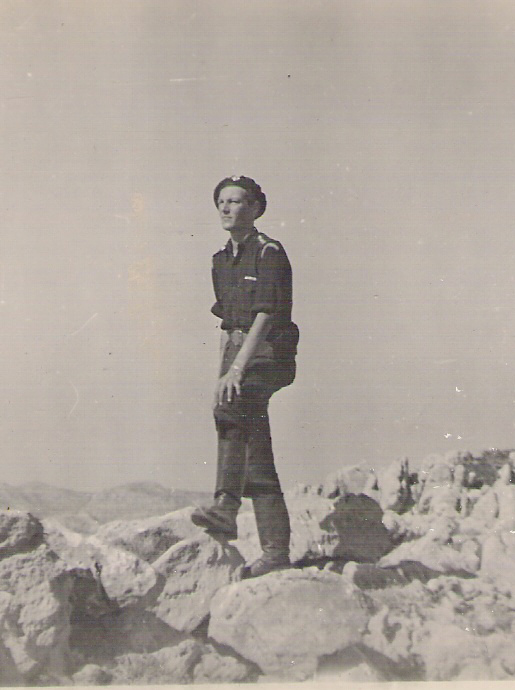
Moss on Crete summer 1944

The Damasta sabotage (Greek: Το σαμποτάζ της Δαμάστας) was an attack by Cretan resistance fighters led by British Special Operations Executive officer Captain Bill Stanley Moss MC against German occupation forces in World War II. The attack occurred on 8 August 1944 near the village of Damasta (Greek: Δαμάστα) and was aimed at preventing the Germans assaulting the village of Anogeia.

== Background ==
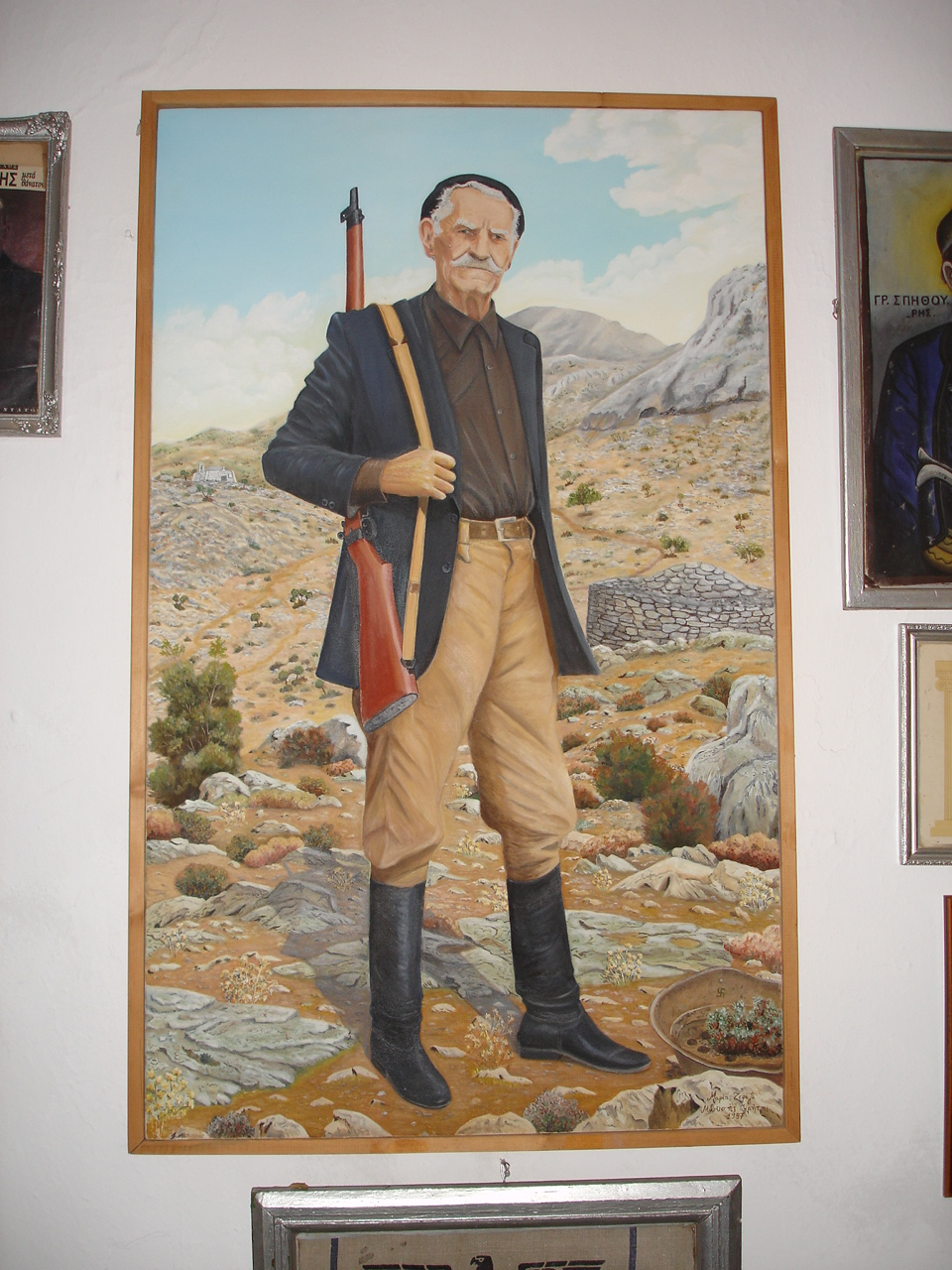
Manolis Spithouris- attacked the armoured car and survived a cannon shell strike to his belly

As part of a coordinated attack with the Special Boat Service, Billy Moss, the second-in-command of the Kreipe kidnap team, was despatched back to Crete in early July by Brigadier Barker-Benfield, the new commander of Force 133 in Cairo to provide guides for the S.B.S. and to raise a small strike force to carry out a diversionary attack at the same time.

Commanded by Major Ian Patterson MC, a force of forty-one S.B.S. raiders had been tasked by G.H.Q.M.E. to destroy petrol and fuel dumps on the island. The recce patrols landed on the night of 1/2 July. The S.B.S. attacks duly went in on the night of 22/23 July and the raiders were extracted by 29 July. They did a great deal of damage. Like the Special Air Service, it was their stock in trade to kill the enemy and destroy assets. At Durasi, 20,000 gallons of petrol [estimate] had been destroyed, one truck and one staff car wrecked and two Germans killed; at Apostoloi, the tally was 35,000-40,000 gallons, ten German killed and two seriously wounded; at Veneration, 70,000 gallons [Estimate] and two Germans killed; at Armeni, thirteen Germans killed, one wounded and one staff car destroyed; at Alikianos, 6,500 gallons [estimate] and three German killed; and at Voukolies, 20,000 gallons [estimate] and two Germans killed including one officer. It cannot have been lost on Müller that a previous commander of Fortress Crete, General Andrae, had been replaced by Bräuer after the 1942 S.B.S. raid; the whole garrison therefore was brought to a high state of readiness.

As a diversion, Moss opted to ambush enemy transport on the Heraklion-Rethymnos road with his small band of Cretan E.O.K. andartes and Russian escaped POWs. However, his hand was forced when, on 7 August 1944, Feldwebel Josef Olenhauer (known to the locals as "Sifis", the common Cretan diminutive for his name) and a few men of the German garrison based in Yeni Gave (Greek: Γενί-Γκαβέ, present day Drosia - Greek: Δροσιά) went up to the village of Anogeia in search of forced labour workers. Olenhauer ordered his men to round up selected males with the aim of forcing them to march towards Rethymno. The villagers refused to conform, hence fifty were taken hostage in retribution. While on its way to Rethymno, the column was ambushed by local ELAS guerrillas, who attacked the German detachment at a location called Sfakaki (Σφακάκι), freeing the hostages and killing all the Germans. Despite the success of the move, the villagers of Anogeia feared that reprisals from the Germans were imminent and therefore took to the mountains joining the local andartes. It was only a matter of time before there was a retaliatory response in force.

== Ambush ==
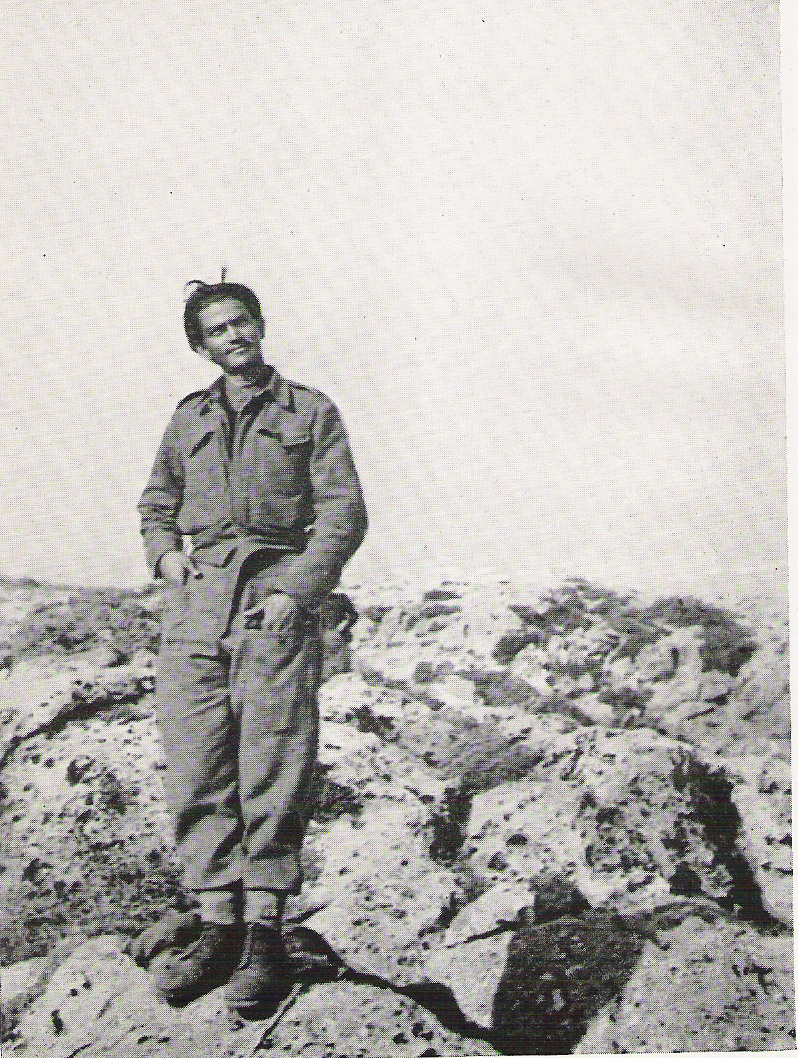
Kephaloyannis Kostas, codenamed "Deerslayer" by SOE - Crete 1944

On the following day, 8 August, the resistance group commanded by the British Special Operations Executive officer Captain Bill Stanley Moss MC consisting of eight Cretans from Anogeia organized into EOK (Kefalogiannis, Stavrakakis, Sbokos, Spithouris, Skoulas and Kontokalos) and six escaped Russian prisoners of war, marched to the main road connecting Rethymno and Heraklion. Moss had previously created a small strike force of escaped Russian POWs working with the andartes, planning to attack enemy transport on the Heraklion-Rethymno road. However, in the light of events in Anogeia, he instead set out to waylay the inevitable response before the German troops left their transport and deployed, so that Anogeia might be saved.

He chose an ambush site by a bridge in the Damastos location, one kilometer west of the village of Damasta and mined it with Hawkins grenades, preparing for the German reaction. After destroying various passing vehicles, among which was a lorry carrying military mail to Chania, the German force on its way to target Anogeia finally appeared. It consisted of a truck of infantrymen backed up by an armoured car. Moss and his group attacked the German troops. Moss crawled up to the back of the armoured car and dropped a grenade into the hatch. In total 35 Germans and 10 Italians were killed, as well as one Russian partisan, and 12 Axis prisoners taken in the clash that followed. Cretan partisan Manolis Spithouris (Ntampakomanolis) was seriously wounded in the abdomen. Nevertheless, he was rescued in "extremely brave action" by Kostas Kephaloyannis (Kountokostas) and treated by fellow andartes, as well as Moss and Georgios Tyrakis, managing to survive. Moss argued on his return to Cairo that Kephaloyannis should be decorated for his action.

The operation is described in detail in Moss's book A War of Shadows and commemorated at Damasta and the Historical Museum of Crete.

== Aftermath ==
The expediency of the ambush in Damasta has been strongly disputed. General Müller had replaced General Bruno Bräuer, as commander of Fortress Crete on 1 July 1944. Bräuer had not instigated reprisals after the Kidnap of General Kreipe as no one had been killed, and the result of the abduction had been a loss of face for the Germans rather than of personnel. This contrasted with General Müller and the almost instant execution of 50 Cretans after the SBS raid in May/June 1942 and the destruction of Viannos by Müller in September 1943 in reprisal for andartes's attacks in the Kato Simi area.

Whilst Moss had hoped that the ambush might have saved Anogeia, Müller, now the German commander in Crete, had further strategic reasons for reprisals and terror across Crete in order to assist the German planned evacuation from much of the island to Chania as well as not wishing to let Anogeia go unpunished for years of resistance. Anogeia residents had been actively involved in, and given refuge to, the resistance for many years, had killed the Sergeant Commander Olenhauer and the garrison from Yeni-Gave and had also provided shelter to the abductors of General Heinrich Kreipe. His order reads:-

"ORDER BY THE GERMAN GENERAL COMMANDER OF THE GARRISON OF CRETE – "Because the town of Anogia is the centre of the English Intelligence on Crete, because the people of Anogia committed the murder of the Sergeant Commander of the Yeni-Gave, as well as of the garrison under his orders, because the people of Anogia carried out the sabotage of Damasta, because in Anogia the guerrillas of the various groups of resistance take refuge and find protection and because it was through Anogia that the kidnappers with General Von Kreipe passed using Anogia as a transit camp, we order its COMPLETE DESTRUCTION and the execution of every male person of Anogia who would happen to be within the village and around it within a distance of one kilometre" CHANEA 13TH AUGUST 1944, THE GENERAL COMMANDER OF THE GARRISON OF CRETE, H. MULLER.

As a result of Müller's order, about 30 residents of Anogeia were executed, the village was systematically pillaged for more than 20 days and eventually razed to the ground.

On 21 August, the Germans executed 30 men from the village of Damasta after accusing them as accomplices for not having given warning about the ambush and swept their village away.

Müller was convicted for this and other war crimes. He was sentenced to death on 9 December 1946 and executed by firing squad 20 May 1947.

== Memorial monument ==
The monument was designed by two architects from Heraklion, Nikos Scoutelis and Flavio Zanon, and built in 1994 with funds given by the families of the village of Damasta.

The monument includes an extract from a poem written by Odysseus Elytis, the Greek poet and winner of the 1979 Nobel Prize for Literature. The poem, called To Axion Esti ("Worthy It Is"; Eng. trans.) is a long poem in which the speaker explores the essence of his being as well as the identity of his country, Greece, and people.

The translation of the part of the poem engraved on the monument is:

THEY STRIKE (MY STONE) WITH A HEAVY AXE

THEY PIERCE IT WITH A HARDENED SCALPEL

THEY CARVE MY STONE WITH A BITTER CHISEL

AND THE MORE TIME ERODES MATTER THE CLEARER THE ORACLE COMES OUT OF MY FACE:

FEAR THE WRATH OF THE DEAD AND THE STATUES OF THE ROCKS!
