= David Smiley =

British special forces and intelligence officer

David de Crespigny Smiley LVO OBE MC
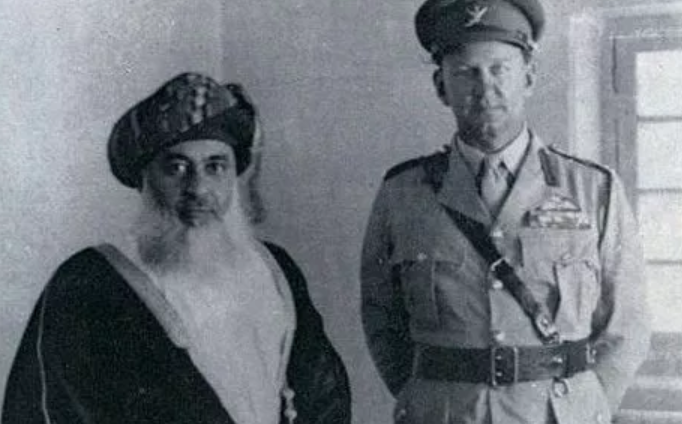
- Smiley with Sultan Said bin Taimur, 1958
- Born: 11 April 1916; London, England
- Died: 9 January 2009 (aged 92); London, England
- Military career
- Allegiance: United Kingdom
- Branch: British Army
- Service years: 1936–1947; 1949–1973
- Rank: Colonel
- Units: No. 52 Commando; Blues and Royals; Somaliland Camel Corps; Royal Horse Guards; Special Operations Executive
- Commands: Royal Horse Guards; Sultan of Oman's Armed Forces
- Conflicts: Second World War; Operation Masterdom; Albanian Subversion; Jebel Akhdar War; North Yemen Civil War
- Awards: Lieutenant of the Royal Victorian Order; Officer of the Order of the British Empire; Military Cross & Bar; Mentioned in Despatches
- Other work: Military Attaché, Stockholm
- Smiley's voice from the BBC programme MI6: A Century in the Shadows

Colonel David de Crespigny Smiley, LVO, OBE, MC & Bar (11 April 1916 – 9 January 2009) was a British special forces and intelligence officer. He fought in the Second World War in Palestine, Iraq, Persia, Syria, the Western Desert and with Special Operations Executive (SOE) in Albania and Thailand.

== Biography ==
=== Early life ===
Smiley was the 4th and youngest son of Sir John Smiley, 2nd Baronet and Valerie Champion de Crespigny, youngest daughter of Sir Claude Champion de Crespigny, who was a noted jockey, balloonist, sportsman and adventurer.

His father fought in the Second Boer War between 1899 and 1900 with 4th Argyll and Sutherland Highlanders before joining the North of Ireland Imperial Yeomanry (redesignated the North Irish Horse in 1908). He gained the rank of major in the service of the Carabiniers (6th Dragoon Guards) and fought in the First World War.

David Smiley was educated at the Nautical College, Pangbourne, Berkshire, England, where he was a noted sportsman.

Some have suggested that John le Carré consciously or unconsciously took David Smiley's surname for that of his hero George Smiley.

=== Military career ===
Smiley attended the Royal Military College, Sandhurst, in 1934, and was commissioned into the Royal Horse Guards in 1936. While based in Windsor, Berkshire, with the Blues, he was seen as a "man-about-town", owning a Bentley car and a Miles Whitney Straight aircraft. He was also an amateur jockey and won seven races under National Hunt rules.

After the outbreak of the Second World War in 1939, Smiley's regiment sailed for Palestine, where one of his first jobs was to shoot his troop of forty horses when it became clear they were of no use in modern combat.

In 1940 Smiley joined the Somaliland Camel Corps, but was to arrive at Berbera the same day it was decided to evacuate British Somaliland. He returned frustrated to Egypt where he persuaded family friend General Wavell to recommend him for the newly formed commandos. Smiley was appointed a company commander (with the rank of captain) with 52 Commando and his first mission was sneaking from Sudan into Abyssinia.

He fought against Vichy French forces in Syria. For his reconnaissance work in ruins near Palmyra he was mentioned in despatches (Middle-East, 1941).

Smiley was recruited by the Special Operations Executive (SOE) 1943 and undertook his first operation with them in Palestine in the same year. Later 1943 he parachuted into Albania where he co-ordinated partisan operations for eight months, and was awarded an immediate Military Cross. In April 1944 Smiley and Lieutenant Colonel Neil " Billy" McLean again parachuted into Albania, carrying out guerrilla operations, for which Smiley was awarded a Bar to the Military Cross in 1944. He was also appointed an Officer of the Order of the British Empire in 1946 for his service with the SOE in Thailand.

He was Colonel of the Royal Horse Guards between December 1951 to December 1954. He rode behind The Queen in the Gold State Coach in the Coronation Procession on 2 June 1953.

He was appointed as a Member of the Fourth Class of the Royal Victorian Order in 1952 and received the Coronation Medal. He was British Military Attaché to Stockholm between 1955 and 1958.

After the war, he held the record for the most falls in one season on the Cresta Run in St Moritz; bizarrely, he represented Kenya (where he owned a farm) in the Commonwealth Winter Games of 1960.

He was Commander of the Sultan of Muscat and Oman's Armed Forces between 1958 and 1961. He was Military Advisor to Yemen between 1962 and 1967.

=== Later work ===
Smiley was the author of three books based on his experiences, Arabian Assignment, Albanian Assignment and Irregular Regular.

Smiley died on 9 January 2009, survived by his wife, Moyra (daughter of Lieutenant Colonel Lord Francis George Montagu Douglas Scott, KCMG, DSO, the 6th Duke of Buccleuch's youngest son; and Lady Eileen Nina Evelyn Sibell Elliot-Murray-Kynynmound – married 28 April 1947) two sons, Xan de Crespigny Smiley (born 1 May 1949) and Philip David Smiley (born 26 Aug 1951), a stepson and a stepdaughter.

== Awards and decorations ==
- Lieutenant of the Royal Victorian Order
- Mentioned in Despatches 1941 – for operations in the Middle-East
- Military Cross 1943 – SOE operations in Albania
- Bar to the Military Cross – 1944
- French Croix de Guerre 1945 – Indochina
- Officer of the Order of the British Empire 1946 – SOE operations in Thailand
- He was admitted to Honourable Corps of Gentlemen at Arms in 1966.
- Knight Commander, Order of the Sword of Sweden
- Grand Cordon, Order of Skanderbeg of Albania
- Order of Freedom of Albania (1st Class)

== Gallery ==
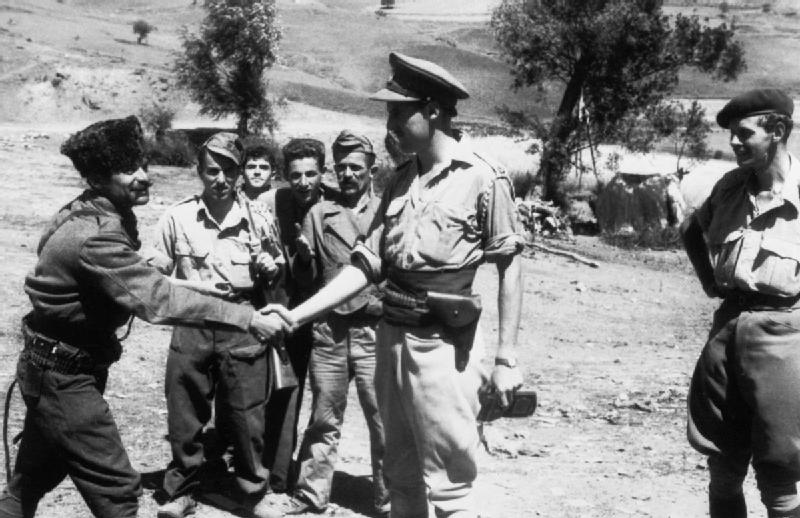
David Smiley as a Major in the SOE in Albania

== Bibliography ==
- David Smiley, "Arabian Assignment", with Peter Kemp (Peter Mant McIntyre Kemp) – Cooper – London – 1975 (ISBN 978-0850521818). With numerous photographs.
- David Smiley, Albanian Assignment, foreword by Patrick Leigh Fermor – Chatto & Windus – London – 1984 (ISBN 978-0701128692). With numerous photographs.
- David Smiley, "Irregular Regular", Michael Russell – Norwich – 1994 (ISBN 978-0859552028). Translated in French by Thierry Le Breton, Au coeur de l'action clandestine des commandos au MI6, L'Esprit du Livre Editions, France, 2008 (ISBN 978-2915960273). With numerous photographs.
- Clive Jones, "The Clandestine Lives of Colonel David Smiley: Code Name 'Grin', Edinburgh: Edinburgh University Press, 2019 (ISBN 978 1 4744 4115 5) With photographs.
- Colonel Dayrell Oakley-Hill et David Smiley (Introduction) "An Englishman in Albania: Memoirs of a British Officer 1929–1955 ", The Centre for Albanian Studies, Learning Design Limited, London, 2002 (ISBN 978-1850439400). With numerous photographs.
- David Smiley, foreword of "General of the Dead Army", Ismail Kadare (ISBN 978-1860466441).
- Leroy Thompson et Ken MacSwan, Uniforms of the soldiers of fortune – Blandford Press – Poole – 1985 (ASIN B000V9AOHE). David Smiley is pictured in Yemen.
- Roderick Bailey, The Wildest Province : SOE in the Land of the Eagle – 2008 – Jonathan Cape Ltd (ISBN 9780224079167).
- Bernd J. Fischer, Albania at War, 1939–1945, West Lafayette, Purdue University Press, 1999 (ISBN 978-1850655312).
- E. Bruce Reynolds, Thailand's Secret War. The Free Thai, OSS, and SOE during World War II, Cambridge University Press, 2004. SOE in Thailand, 1945 (ISBN 978-0521836012). David Smiley is photographed page 377 with his Force 136 team.
- Stephen Dorril, MI6 : Inside the Covert World of Her Majesty's Secret Intelligence Service The Free Press, New York, 2000 (ISBN 978-0743203791 ).

== See also ==
- Sophie Moss
- Daily Telegraph Obituary dated 9 January 2009
- ALBANIA IN WW II by Julian Amery, from Oxford Companion to the Second World War (1995), pp. 24–26
- Return to Yemen David Smiley is coming back in Yemen, 2003, British-Yemeni Society.
- Green Mountain Jebel Akhdar Muscat and Oman 1957–59
- The Jebel Akhdar War Oman 1954–1959 by Major John Meagher USMC
