= Heinrich Kreipe =

German soldier (1895–1976)

- Born: Karl Heinrich Georg Ferdinand Kreipe; 5 June 1895; Niederspier, Sondershausen Administrative District, Principality of Schwarzburg-Sondershausen, German Empire
- Died: 14 June 1976 (aged 81); Northeim, Lower Saxony, West Germany
- Relatives: ∞ Ilse, widowed Hanauer, née Behrens (1906–2002)
- Military career
- Allegiance: German Empire; Weimar Republic; Nazi Germany
- Branch: Imperial German Army; Freikorps; Reichsheer; German Army
- Service years: 1914–1944
- Rank: Generalmajor
- Commands: 79th Infantry Division; 22nd Infantry Division; Fortress Crete
- Conflicts: World War I: Battle of Verdun; World War II: Western Campaign; Operation Barbarossa; Siege of Leningrad
- Awards: Iron Cross; Knight's Cross of the Iron Cross

Karl Heinrich Georg Ferdinand Kreipe (5 June 1895 – 14 June 1976) was a German career soldier who served in both World War I and World War II. While leading German forces in occupied Crete in April 1944, he was abducted by British SOE officers Patrick Leigh Fermor and William Stanley Moss, with the support of the Cretan resistance.

== Life ==
Kreipe was born in 1895, the thirteenth child of Protestant pastor Friedrich Heinrich Gerhard Kreipe (1844–1914) and his second wife (∞ Sondershausen 29 April 1892) Marie Karoline Luise Pfannschmidt/Pfannenschmidt (1857–1925). Heinrich had ten half-siblings from his father's first marriage (∞ Uelzen 10 November 1872) to Sophie Dorothea Charlotte Elisabeth Hintze (1853–1889). He also had four siblings, three sisters and older brother Gottfried Karl Friedrich Alexander (b. 2 May 1894 in Niederspier) who was wounded with the 1st Company/I. Battalion/Reserve-Infanterie-Regiment 252 in WWI and succumbed to his wounds on 9 February 1915.

Heinrich Kreipe achieved his Abitur at the Gymnasium in Sondershausen in the spring of 1914 and started studies at the University of Jena. On 11 August 1914, he joined the Replacement Battalion of the 1st Thuringian Field Artillery Regiment No. 19 in Erfurt. On 12 October 1914, after completing basic training, he was transferred to the 2nd East Prussian Field Artillery Regiment No. 52 and was deployed into the field.

He fought in World War I, seeing action at the Battle of Verdun where he was awarded the Iron Cross First Class. After the war, he joined the Freikorps, and then the new Reichswehr in October 1919. By 1939, Kreipe had attained the rank of lieutenant colonel in the Wehrmacht.

=== World War II ===
As commander of Infantry Regiment 909 of the 58th Infantry Division, Kreipe participated in the Battle of France, the drive towards Leningrad and the fighting in Kuban during Operation Barbarossa. He was awarded the Knight's Cross of the Iron Cross on 13 October 1941. Kreipe remained at the Siege of Leningrad until May 1942, when he was transferred back to Germany, where he took up administrative and teaching positions. On 10 June 1943, he was delegated with the leadership of the 79th Infantry Division and on 8 September with effect from 1 September 1943, he was appointed commander of this division. On 25 October 1943, he was placed in the Führerreserve (OKH)/Army High Command Leader Reserve. A health cure (spa stay) lasting several months was ordered to restore health. On 1 March 1944, he was commanded to the 22nd Infantry Division (Fortress Crete) and on 15 March 1944, he was appointed commander of the 22nd Infantry Division.

==== Abduction by Greek and British agents ====
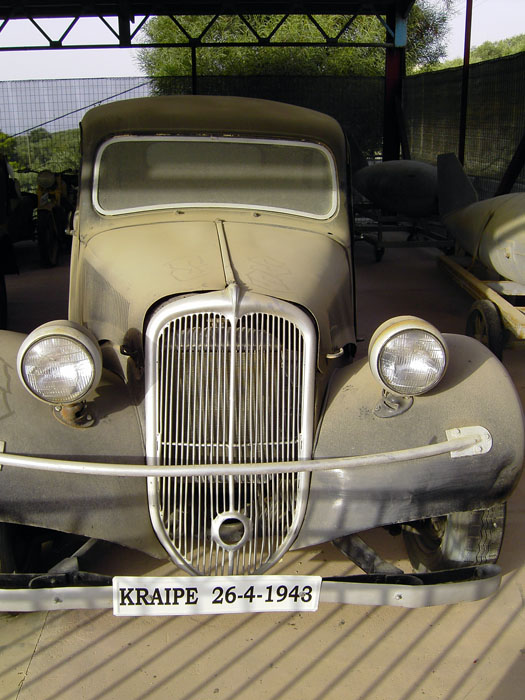
A Citroën Traction Avant, similar to the type of vehicle used by Kreipe. (Note: Photograph of alleged actual vehicle is a Studebaker Dictator.)

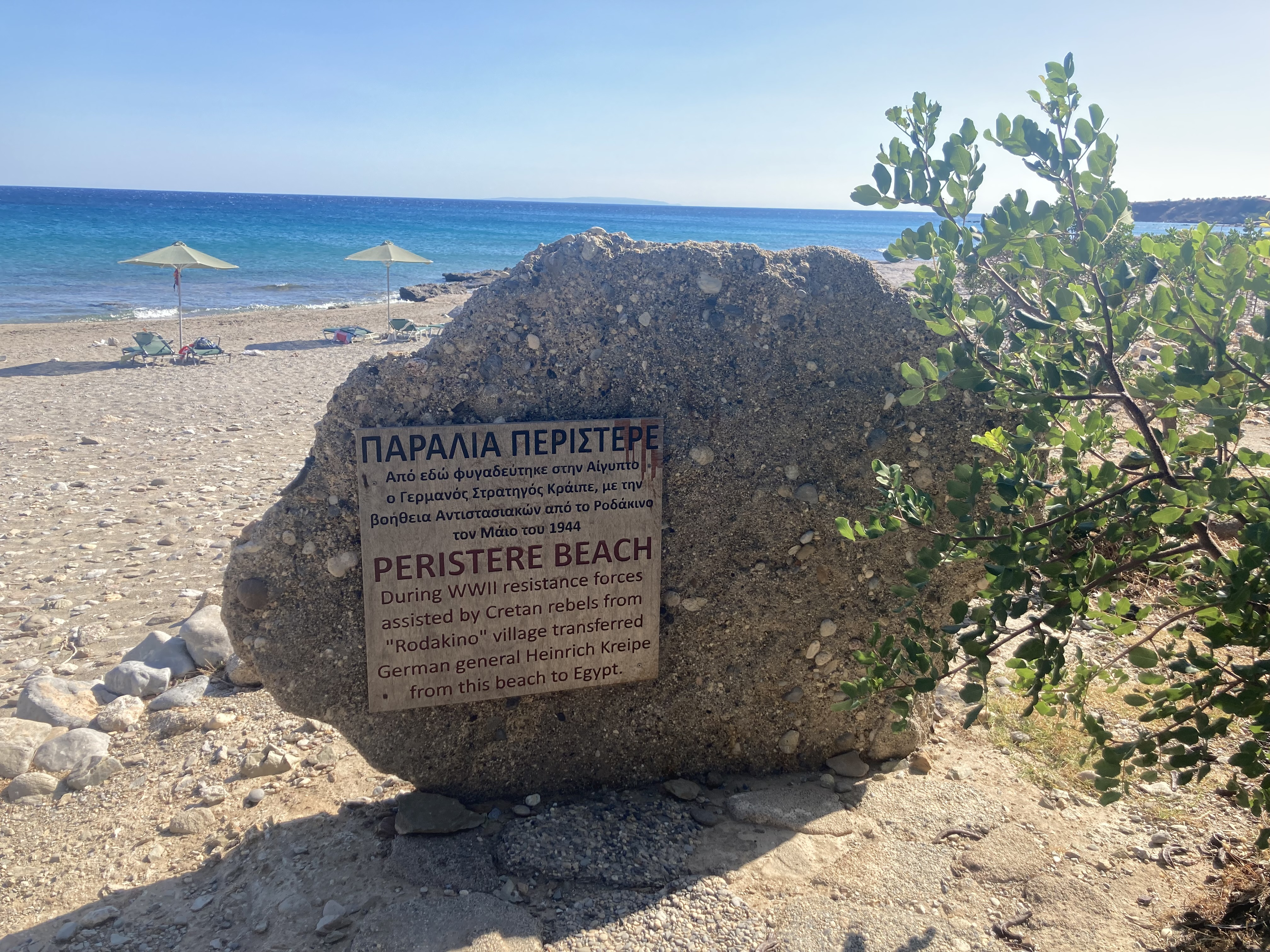
Plaque at Peristere Beach near the village of Rodakino, Crete, commemorating the extraction of Heinrich Kreipe in 1944.

In the spring of 1944, the Allies hatched a plan to kidnap General Müller, whose harsh repressive measures had earned him the nickname "the Butcher of Crete". Major Patrick Leigh Fermor led the planned operation, assisted by Captain Bill Stanley Moss, Greek SOE agents and Cretan resistance fighters. However General Müller left the island before the plan could be executed. Major Leigh Fermor decided to abduct Kreipe instead.

On the night of 26 April 1944 General Kreipe left headquarters in Archanes. The car headed without escort to a well-guarded residence, "Villa Ariadni", about 5 kilometres (3.1 mi) outside Heraklion. Major Leigh Fermor and Captain Moss, dressed as German military policemen, waited for him 15 kilometres (9.3 mi) before his residence. When he arrived, they asked the driver to stop and asked for their papers. As soon as the car stopped, Leigh Fermor opened Kreipe's door, jumped in, and threatened him with his pistol, while Moss took the driver's seat. (The abduction is now commemorated near Archanes.)

Moss drove the kidnappers and the General for an hour and a half through 22 controlled road-blocks in Heraklion before he left Leigh Fermor to drive on and abandon the car, with material being planted that suggested their escape from the island had been made by submarine. Moss set off with the general on a cross-country march, supported by the Greek resistance, soon rejoined by Leigh Fermor. Hunted by German patrols, the kidnappers crossed the mountains to reach the southern side of the island, where a British Motor Launch (ML 842 commanded by Brian Coleman) was waiting to rendezvous. Eventually, on 14 May 1944, they were picked up from Peristeres beach near Rhodakino and ferried to Egypt.

Kreipe was interrogated and sent to a prisoner-of-war camp in Canada. He was later transferred to a special camp in Wales.

=== Later life ===
Kreipe was released from British captivity in 1947. He met his kidnappers again in 1972 on a Greek television programme.

== Death ==
Generalmajor (Ret.) Kreipe died at Northeim on 14 June 1976.

== In popular culture ==
In 1950, W. Stanley Moss, one of the leaders of the operation, wrote a bestselling account of the abduction: Ill Met by Moonlight. In the 1957 film Ill Met by Moonlight, based on the book, Kreipe is portrayed by Marius Goring. This operation was also parodied by the BBC radio program The Goon Show with the episode "Ill Met by Goonlight".

== Promotions ==
- 11 August 1914 Kriegsfreiwilliger (War Volunteer)
- 7 February 1915 Gefreiter (Private E-2 / Lance Corporal)
- 1 October 1915 Unteroffizier (NCO / Corporal / Junior Sergeant)
- 20 October 1915 Vizefeldwebel (Vice Sergeant / Vice Staff Sergeant)
- 24 December 1915 Leutnant der Reserve (2nd Lieutenant of the Reserves)
- 3 April 1918 Leutnant (active 2nd Lieutenant) without Patent
  - 12 December 1918 received Patent from 30 January 1915
  - 1 July 1922 received Reichswehr Rank Seniority (RDA) from 1 September 1915 (88)
- 31 July 1925 Oberleutnant (1st Lieutenant) with effect and RDA from 1 April 1925 (67)
- 1 February 1930 Hauptmann (Captain) (28)
- 1 November 1935 Major (49)
- 30 September 1938 Oberstleutnant (Lieutenant Colonel) with effect and RDA from 1 October 1938 (17)
- 14 August 1941 Oberst (Colonel) with effect and RDA from 1 September 1941 (47)
  - 25 February 1942 received new and improved RDA from 1 October 1940 (12b)
- 8 September 1943 Generalmajor (Major General) with effect and RDA from 1 September 1943 (17)

== Awards and decorations ==
- Iron Cross (1914), 2nd and 1st Class
  - 2nd Class on 27 June 1916
  - 1st Class on 25 May 1918
- Princely Schwarzburg Honor Cross, 3rd Class with Swords on (SEK3X/SE3X) on 6 November 1916
- Wound Badge (1918) in Black on 4 February 1921
- DLRG basic certificate (Grundschein) of the German Life Saving Association
- DRA German Gymnastics and Sports Badge in Bronze
- DLRG examination certificate (Prüfungsschein) of the German Life Saving Association
- Honour Cross of the World War 1914/1918 with Swords on 1 March 1935
- Wehrmacht Long Service Award, 4th to 2nd Class on 2 October 1936
- Repetition Clasp 1939 to the Iron Cross 1914, 2nd and 1st Class
  - 2nd Class on 1 June 1940
  - 1st Class on 27 June 1940
- Knight's Cross of the Iron Cross on 16 October 1941
- Winter Battle in the East 1941–42 Medal on 29 July 1942

== Sources ==
- German Federal Archives: BArch PERS 6/1519 and PERS 6/300062

== Notes ==
Military offices
Preceded by General der Infanterie Friedrich-Wilhelm Müller	Commander of 22. Infanterie-Division (Luftlande); 15 February 1944 – 26 April 1944	Succeeded by Generalleutnant Helmut Friebe
