= A War of Shadows =

- Author: W. Stanley Moss
- Language: English
- Genre: War
- Publisher: T.V. Boardman and Co. Ltd, Bene Factum Publishing, Paul Dry Publishing
- Publication date: 1952, 2014 (UK), 2014 (USA)
- Media type: Print (hardback & paperback)
- Pages: 240
- ISBN: 978-1-909657-38-0
- Preceded by: Ill Met by Moonlight

A War of Shadows is a non-fiction book written by W. Stanley Moss, a British soldier, writer and traveller, best known, together with Patrick Leigh Fermor, for the Kidnap of General Kreipe as described in Moss's book Ill Met by Moonlight. Moss recounts his subsequent activities during World War II as an agent of the Special Operations Executive (SOE) in Crete, Macedonia (Greece) and Siam (Thailand). The 2014 editions contain an Introduction by one of Moss's children and a short biography, Billy Moss: Soldier, Writer, Traveller - A Brief Life by Alan Ogden as an Afterword.

== Summary ==
In May 1941, German forces attacked and occupied Crete. Allied forces were driven back and evacuated to North Africa by June. The Special Operations Executive (SOE) inserted agents on Crete in order to work with the local resistance in harrying German occupying forces.

== Crete ==
After the Kreipe Abduction, Moss returned to Crete on 6 July 1944. On the main road connecting Rethymno and Heraklion, he led a resistance group consisting of eight Cretans and six escaped Russian POW soldiers in an ambush on German forces intent on attacking Anogeia. He chose an ambush site by a bridge in the Damastos location, one kilometre west of the village of Damasta. After the team destroyed various passing vehicles, among which was a lorry carrying military mail to Chania, the German force on its way to target Anogia finally appeared. It consisted of a truck of infantrymen backed up by an armoured car. Moss and his group attacked the troops. Moss crawled up to the back of the armoured car and dropped a grenade into the hatch. In total, 40 to 50 Germans were killed in the clash that followed and one Russian partisan. He left Crete on 18 August 1944.

== Macedonia ==
Moss served in Macedonia between September and November 1944, being promoted to Major on 24 October. He was sent to join Major Ken Scott in an operation to blow up the railway bridge over the Aliakmon River in order to disrupt German troop movements in and out of Thessaloniki. After heavy rain, the river burst its banks preventing Moss from a final attempt to blow up a section of the bridge. He continued to undertake sabotage operations to hinder the German withdrawal.

== Siam (Thailand) ==
He was then posted to join Force 136 in Siam arriving from Cairo on 25 June 1945 to stay at the Grand Hotel, in Calcutta. Joining Major Ken Scott as Jedburgh team leader and Capt John Hibberdine (W/T) for Operation Sungod, he flew out of Jessore, Bangladesh on 22 August by Dakota landing by parachute in a drop zone by a river, south of Bandon in the Bandon Nakon Sri Tamaraj area. The team's orders included establishing communication with HQ (W/T station Gaberdine), liaising with the Siamese 6th Independent Division, identifying all POW camps, finding locations for drop zones and seaplane landings and preparing to demolish the tunnel on the railway from Chong Khao and Ron Phibun, east to Tunsong. The Mission arranged the orderly surrender of Japanese forces in their area of operations, before Moss left in November 1945.
