= Kidnapping of Heinrich Kreipe =

1944 British kidnapping of a German general in Crete

Kidnap of Major General Kreipe
- Part of SOE operations and the Mediterranean and Middle East theatre
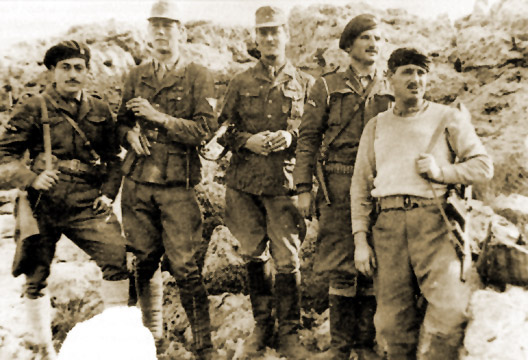
- The abduction team
- Type: Kidnapping
- Location: Crete, Greece; 35.26429°N 25.18202°E
- Planned by: Special Operations Executive
- Commanded by: Patrick Leigh Fermor
- Target: Heinrich Kreipe
- Date: 4 February – 14 May 1944
- Casualties: Kreipe's driver

The kidnapping of Heinrich Kreipe was an operation executed jointly by the British Special Operations Executive (SOE) and local resistance members in Crete in German-occupied Greece during the Second World War. The operation was launched on 4 February 1944, when SOE officer Patrick Leigh Fermor landed in Crete with the intention of abducting notorious war criminal and commander of 22nd Air Landing Division, Friedrich-Wilhelm Müller. By the time of the arrival of the rest of the abduction team, led by William Stanley Moss, two months later, Müller had been succeeded by Heinrich Kreipe, who was chosen as the new target.

On the night of 26 April, Kreipe's car was ambushed while en route from his residence to his divisional headquarters. Kreipe was tied and forced into the back seat while Leigh Fermor and Moss impersonated him and his driver respectively. Kreipe's notorious impatience at roadblocks enabled the car to pass numerous checkpoints before being abandoned at the hamlet of Heliana. The abductors continued on foot, continuing to evade thousands of Axis soldiers sent to stop them, with the help of guides from the local resistance. On 14 May, the team was picked up by a British motorboat from the Rodakino beach and transported to British-held Egypt.

The success of the operation was put into question several months afterwards. The outcome came to be seen as a symbolic propaganda victory rather than a strategic one, with the Political Warfare Executive exploiting Kreipe's capture to suggest he had defected. The abduction operation entered popular imagination through the biographical works of several of its participants, most notably Moss's book Ill Met by Moonlight.

== Background ==
Greece entered the Second World War on the side of the Allies following an Italian invasion from Albania on 28 October 1940. The following year, on 6 April, Nazi Germany launched an invasion of its own from Bulgaria known as Operation Marita; Athens was occupied on 28 April and the resistance on the Greek mainland had ceased by the 30th. King George II and his government had left the Greek mainland for Crete five days earlier. The island was in turn attacked by a Nazi airborne invasion on 20 May 1941. The Germans prevailed after seven days of fighting, forcing an Allied withdrawal to Egypt.

With the conclusion of Operation Marita, Greece was subjected to a Triple Occupation by Germany, Italy and Bulgaria. Crete, now called Fortress Crete, was shared between Germany and Italy. The Germans occupied the western three prefectures of the island with their headquarters in Chania, whilst the Italians occupied the easternmost prefecture of Lasithi. It did not take long for the Cretan resistance to spring up. They assisted Allied soldiers stranded on the island in evading capture and helped them escape to the British controlled Middle East. The escapees helped establish contact between the Special Operations Executive's (SOE) Cairo branch and Cretan resistance organisations. Supplied with wireless sets and augmented by SOE stay behind operatives, they began co-ordinating their actions with the Allied command. Following the surrender of Italy to the Allies in September 1943, Angelico Carta, the commander of the Italian 51st Infantry Division, decided to side with the Allies. Evading German patrols and observation planes Leigh Fermor smuggled him off the island and embarked on a SOE motor torpedo boat at Soutsouro reaching Mersa Matruh the next afternoon, on 23 September 1943.

British officers had considered the idea of capturing a senior German officer as early as November 1942, when a SOE agent on Crete, Xan Fielding, proposed seizing the island's chief military governor at the time, Alexander Andrae. When Andrae was posted away, his successor Bruno Bräuer was targeted for capture. None of these plans were carried out. Carta's successful dispatch to Egypt rekindled the idea of abducting the chief military commander of Crete. In 1943, Captain William Stanley Moss, a recent SOE recruit and Major Patrick Leigh Fermor, an officer of SOE Cairo's Cretan Desk; hatched a plan for the abduction of General Friedrich-Wilhelm Müller, then commander of the 22nd Air Landing Division. Müller had gained a reputation for brutality and was despised by the Cretan people, being responsible for mass executions, torture, the razing of villages and conscripting civilians into labour units. The SOE planned to kidnap him while keeping the use of violence at a minimum and transport him to Egypt, thus giving a morale boost to the Cretans. Leigh Fermor submitted the plan to the commander of the SOE in the Middle East Brigadier Karl Vere Barker-Benfield. The plan received widespread support in SOE's Cairo branch, with Special Operations Committee senior executive Bickham Sweet-Escott being the only one to oppose it. Sweet-Escott argued that the benefit of raising the morale of the Cretan resistance was significantly outweighed by the high risk of German reprisals. Nevertheless, in September 1943, Barker-Benfield approved the plan and the operation was set in motion.

== Operation ==
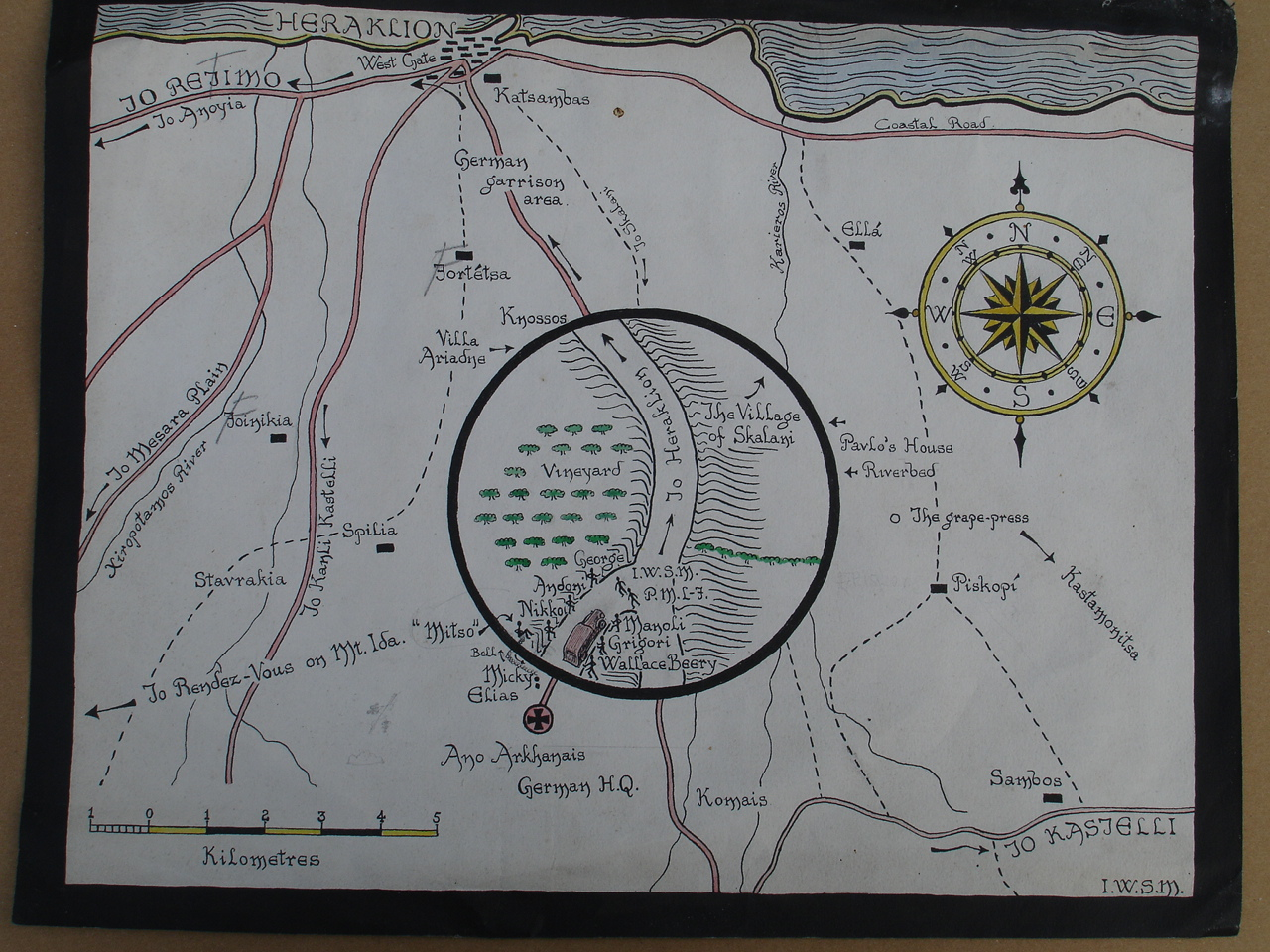
W. Stanley Moss' sketch of the abduction

In late 1943, Leigh Fermor and Moss formed a squad with two Cretan resistance members, Georgios Tyrakis and Emmanouil Paterakis, who were to accompany them in their mission. After undergoing training at an SOE camp in Ramat David, Palestine and facing numerous delays the team flew to the headquarters of the British 8th Army in Bari on 4 January 1944. On 4 February, they boarded a bomber at the Brindisi airport which was to transport them to Crete's Katharo plateau. Leigh Fermor was the only one airdropped, due to a sudden weather change that caused the area to be obscured by clouds. Leigh Fermor was greeted by Cretan resistance members and SOE Captain Sandy Rendel, while the rest of the squad returned to Cairo. While hiding in a cave above the village of Tapais in the Lasithi mountains, Leigh Fermor reestablished old contacts, and learned that Müller had been replaced by Major General Heinrich Kreipe on 1 March. On 30 March, Leigh Fermor informed the Cretan section of SOE Cairo about Müller's replacement, simultaneously signaling his intent to carry out the operation. Although Leigh Fermor knew little about Kreipe, he insisted that the capture of a high ranking German officer was sufficient to raise the morale of both the Cretans and SOE's Greek section. The rest of the team attempted to parachute into Crete seven more times without success; after two months, on 4 April, they arrived by motor launch at Tsoutsoura.

The team moved to a cave system in the mountains above Kastamonitsa village, the hideout of a local resistance group. The SOE team was joined by Antonios and Grigorios Papaleonidas, Michail Akoumianakis and Grigorios Chnarakis. Akoumianakis' house was located across the road from Kreipe's residence, the Villa Ariadne, in the village of Knossos. Leigh Fermor disguised himself as a Cretan shepherd for his trip to Knossos. After traveling by bus with Akoumianakis, he reconnoitered the vicinity of the villa. Enclosed by a triple wire barrier (one of which was rumoured to be electrified) and guarded by a sizeable garrison, it was deemed too well-fortified for a direct assault. It was decided to seize Kreipe during one of his frequent trips from his residence to his divisional headquarters in Ano Archanes, some 5 miles (8.0 km) away. Surveying the route, they discovered a T-junction where the road from Archanes joined the main road to Heraklion, forcing cars to slow down to almost a standstill; the location was subsequently named Point A. The owner of a small cottage outside Skalani (el), some twenty minutes travel time from the abduction point, agreed to collaborate, turning the building into an observation point. Owing to the heavy traffic on the main road, the operation had to be undertaken at night.

Akoumianakis supplied the team with two Feldgendarmerie summer uniforms, complete with rank insignia for a corporal, campaign badges, side arms and a traffic policeman's stick. Athanasakis set up an observation post on a height overlooking the German headquarters, signalling whenever Kreipe left the building. Four more resistance members, Efstratios Saviolakis, Dimitrios Tzatzadakis, Nikolaos Komis and Antonios Zoidakis, were recruited as guides. Shortly before the abduction was to take place, the team received a letter from a local commander of the pro-communist Greek People's Liberation Army (ELAS), who threatened to betray them to the authorities if they did not vacate the area. Leigh Fermor replied with an ambiguously written note and the ELAS commander did not carry out his threat. The operation was postponed for several days as the general did not leave his residence.

On the night of 26/27 April 1944, Leigh Fermor and Moss received a signal that the general had got into his car. Changing into the German uniforms, they followed Saviolakis to Point A. Leigh Fermor and Moss hid in a ditch on the east side of the road. Further to the west Zoidakis, the Papaleonidas brothers, Tyrakis and Komis lay in wait. At 9:30 pm, Tzatzadakis flashed his torch three times signalling that Kreipe's car was approaching unescorted. Leigh Fermor and Moss blocked the road and as the car came closer Moss waved his policeman's stick and shouted "Halt!". When the car stopped, Leigh Fermor requested that identity papers be shown. As Kreipe reached for his pocket, Leigh Fermor jacked the door open, while simultaneously pressing his automatic weapon against Kreipe's chest and Moss struck the driver on the head with his cosh, knocking him unconscious. The rest of the team sprung up and surrounded the car. A brief struggle ensued, which ended when Paterakis tied Kreipe. Moss took up the driver's seat and Leigh Fermor impersonated the general, with Kreipe, Saviolakis, Tyrakis and Paterakis in the backseat, driving off to Heraklion. The rest cleared the spot of signs of struggle and also headed to Heraklion with the driver.

The car passed through 22 checkpoints in Heraklion, coming into the road to Rethymno and stopping outside a steep mountain track leading to Anogeia. Kreipe's penchant for being impatient at roadblocks and acting rudely to the people manning them had made him unpopular among his subordinates, contributing to the success of his kidnapping as the car sped through the check points without stopping. Leigh Fermor drove to the hamlet of Heliana where he abandoned the car. To prevent reprisals against the area's population, he left a note claiming that British special forces had conducted the operation without any local support and scattered incriminating evidence. The team then ascended to Anogeia, where they rested for a few hours. Late in the afternoon of 27 April, a German reconnaissance aircraft dropped leaflets unto the village threatening reprisals if the general was not returned within three days. They soon departed for Mount Ida, where they were met by a band of resistance men led by Michael Xylouris and the SOE officers attached to them. The breakdown of their wireless station meant that all communication had to be conducted by runners, hindering the evacuation. The next day, the team was informed that the Cretans had killed Kreipe's driver as he was too stunned to walk at the necessary pace for the rebels to avoid capture. The team continued its ascent on Ida, where they stayed with another Cretan resistance group.

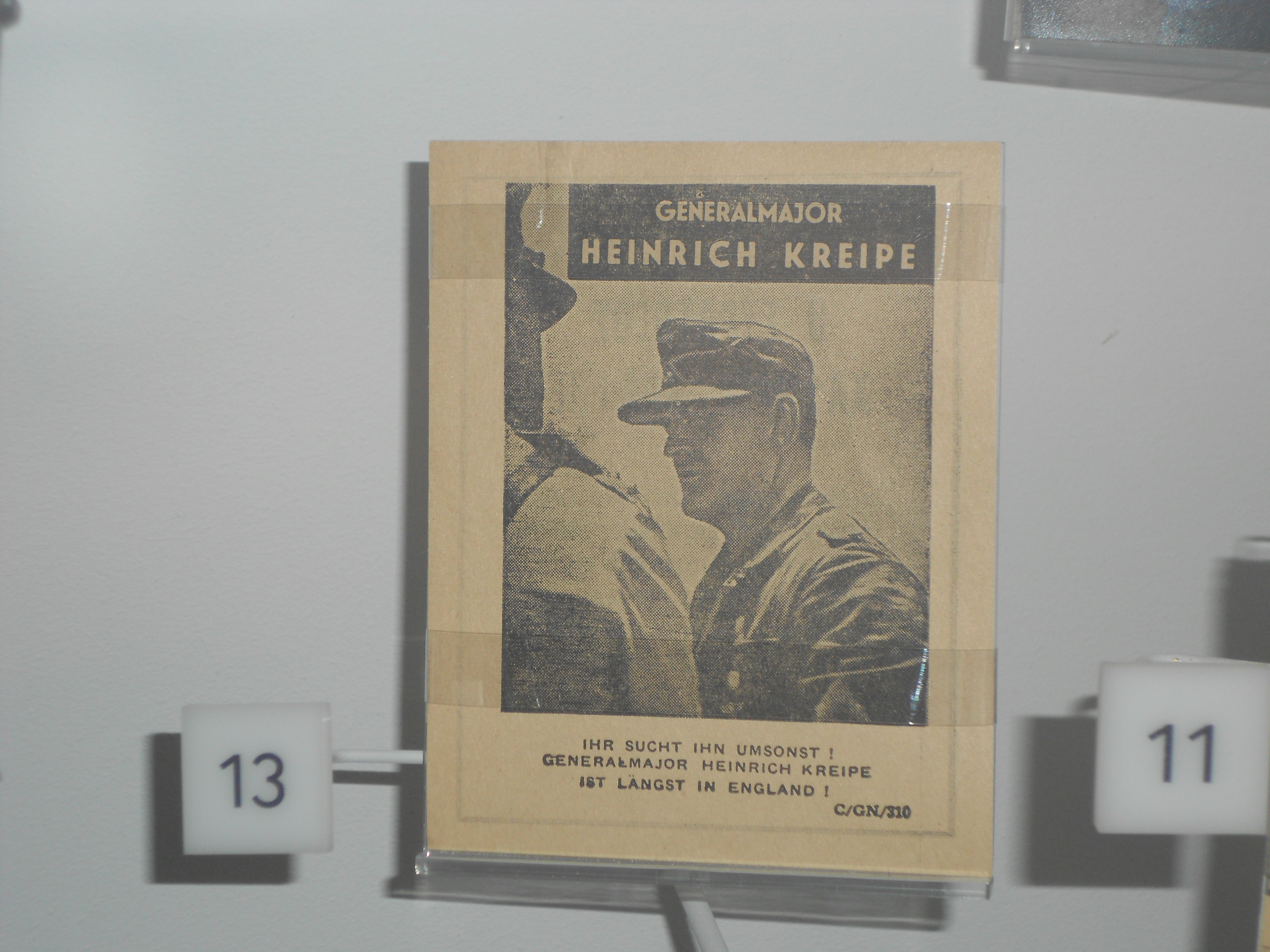
British propaganda leaflet addressed to the German troops: "You are looking for him [Kreipe] in vain! He is long since in England!"

As the team continued their journey from Ida to the Amari Valley, Crete's garrison of over 30,000 men had been placed on alert and Axis troops began to assemble around the mountain range in an attempt to block their escape. After crossing the valley they reached the village of Agia Paraskevi. A report transmitted by the BBC had alerted the Germans that Kreipe had yet to leave the island. Rumours of a general uprising and an Allied invasion had prompted Bräuer to strengthen Chania's garrison and continue the security sweeps. Kreipe's aide-de-camp and guards were arrested on suspicion of complicity. The arrival of a runner enabled the abduction team to request that a boat be sent to Saktouria on 2 May. The runner unexpectedly did not return the following day and the party was informed that Saktouria and other hotbeds of resistance had been destroyed by German troops. Moss and Leigh Fermor set off to the Amari valley in search of a wireless station. On 5 May, they reached the village of Pantanassa where they were able to send and receive written messages once again.

A day later dispatch runner George Psychoundakis brought SOE officer Dick Barnes and a wireless set to the village. In the meantime, the rest of the party evaded a German patrol by moving to Patsos, just two hours away from Pantanassa. It then became known that a unit of the Special Boat Service (SBS) led by George Jellicoe was to land at Limni beach on 9 May, to assist with the evacuation. Moss and Leigh Fermor rendezvoused with the rest of the abduction team at the hamlet of Karines and advanced to Fotinou and then Vilandredo. Once a 200-man German column came to Argygoupoli just an hour's distance from Vilandredo, Dennis Ciclitira and a band of ELAS fighters assisted the team in avoiding their pursuers. When the team reached Asi Gonia, a runner told them that a boat was going to pick them up at Rodakino beach on the night of 14 May. The Rodakiniot guerillas accompanied the team on their final trek. The team, Kreipe, two German prisoners of war and a sick Soviet prisoner of war boarded HMS Motor Launch ML 842 (commanded by Brian Coleman) on 14 May 1944 from Peristeres Beach, west of Rodakino, Operation BRICKLAYER, at 10:00 pm, concluding their mission by landing at Mersa Matruh in Egypt.

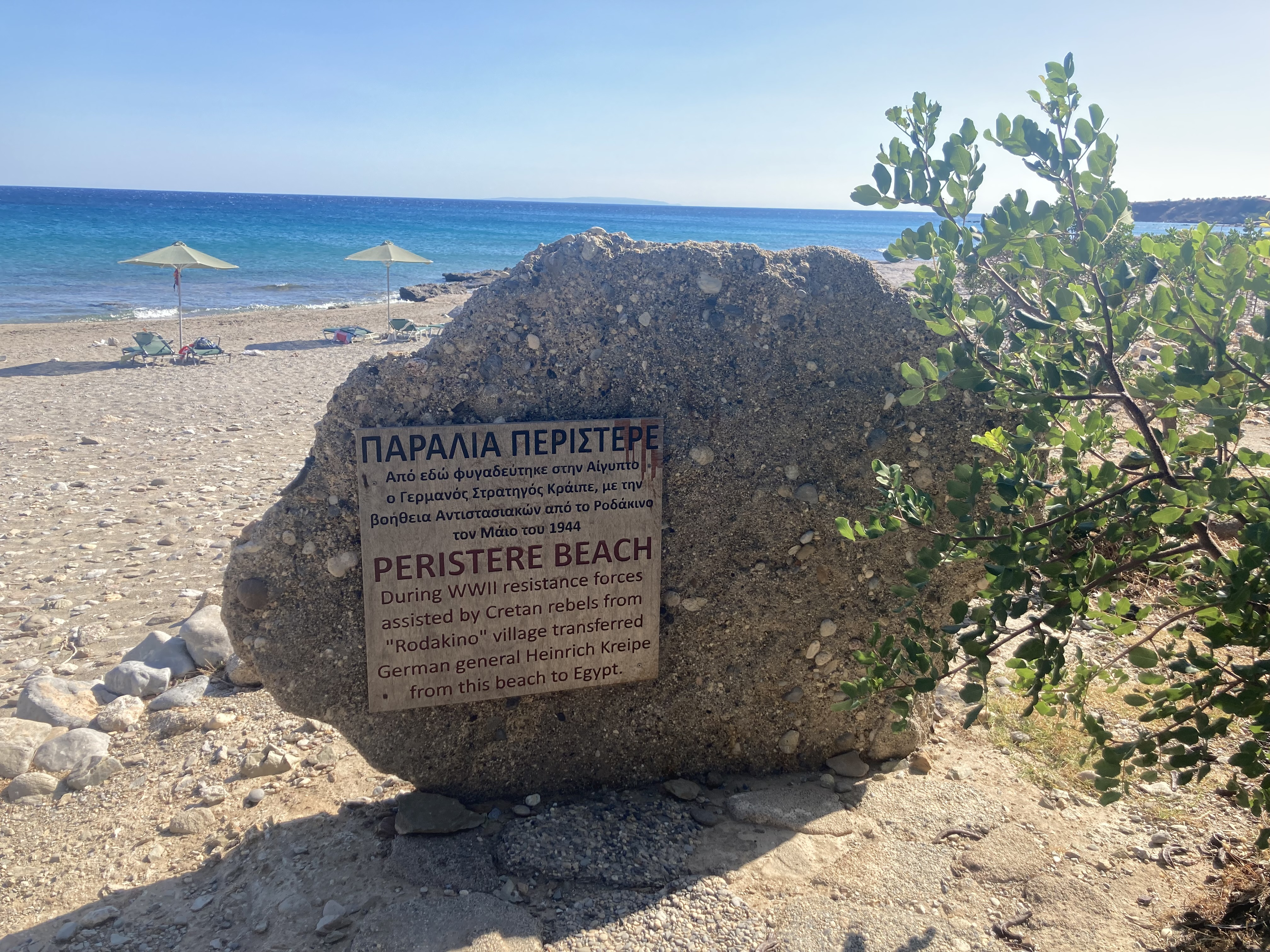
Plaque at Peristere Beach near the village of Rodakino, Crete, commemorating the extraction of Heinrich Kreipe in 1944

== Aftermath ==
Major Leigh Fermor was awarded the Distinguished Service Order and Captain Moss the Military Cross, "For [their] outstanding display of courage and audacity" during the operation. The awards were gazetted on 13 July 1944. Following his interrogation Kreipe was transferred to Calgary in Canada, where he was interned with other captured German generals until 1947. The objective of the operation, as conceived by Leigh Femor was to undertake a bloodless operation, to avoid reprisals, for the purposes of morale and propaganda. The operation dealt a blow to Axis morale on the island and raised that of the local resistance, as the BBC and Royal Air Force praised the operation's success through radio broadcasts and leaflet drops respectively. The benefit of the abduction came into question by some if considered only in military terms as Kreipe was characterised as anti–Nazi by his interrogator. Despite his position he possessed very little information of value to British Intelligence and by the time of his capture Crete was a backwater.

Contrary to the usual practice, across Occupied Europe including Crete, of immediate and brutal response to resistance and/or sabotage activity, General Bruno Bräuer, as commander of Fortress Crete, did not instigate reprisals after the kidnapping as no one had been killed, and the result of the abduction had been a loss of face for the Germans rather than of personnel. This contrasted with General Müller's response and the almost instant execution of 50 Cretans after the SBS raid in May/June 1942 and the destruction of Viannos by Müller in September 1943 in reprisal for andartes' attacks in the Kato Simi area.

Indeed, after the war, a member of Kreipe's staff reported that, on hearing the news of the kidnapping, an uneasy silence in the officers' mess in Heraklion was followed by someone saying, "Well gentlemen, I think this calls for champagne all round."

Post-war correspondence explains that Kreipe was disliked by his soldiers because, amongst other things, he objected to the stopping of his own vehicle for checking in compliance with his commands concerning troops' reviewing approved travel orders. This tension between the General and his troops, in part, explains the reluctance of sentries to stop the General's car as Moss drove it through Heraklion.

Following the Normandy landings in June 1944 and the Allied advance across Europe, it was clear that the tide of war was turning against the Third Reich and the German hold on Crete was becoming precarious.

The British historian Alan Ogden wrote, "If it failed to dent German morale, the kidnap certainly raised Cretan morale at a time when the German forces were engaged in a campaign of terror against the islanders as they prepared for inevitable withdrawal".

On 1 July 1944, Müller, the Butcher of Crete, returned to Crete from the Dodecanese campaign to his new promotion as commander of Fortress Crete, replacing Bräuer.

As Cretan fighters became better armed and more aggressive in 1944, the German troops pulled out of rural areas. For example, Anogeia residents had been actively involved in, and given refuge to, the resistance for many years. On 7 August 1944, Feldwebel Josef Olenhauer (known to the locals as "Sifis", the common Cretan diminutive for his name) and a few men of the German garrison based in Yeni Gave (Greek: Γενί-Γκαβέ, present day Drosia - Greek: Δροσιά) went up to the village of Anogeia in search of forced labour workers. Olenhauer ordered his men to round up selected males with the aim of forcing them to march towards Rethymno. The villagers refused to conform, hence fifty were taken hostage in retribution. While on its way to Rethymno, the column was ambushed by local ELAS guerrillas, who attacked the German detachment at a location called Sfakaki (Σφακάκι), freeing the hostages and killing all the Germans.

Müller’s response was immediate not wishing to let Anogeia go unpunished for years of resistance:

On 8 August 1944, a preemptive attempt was made to seek to protect Anogeia from the impending German reprisals. A German punitive expedition sent against the village of Anogeia was ambushed by Moss and Michael Xylouris' band. The Damasta sabotage, as this came to be known, resulted in the death of thirty Germans and ten Italians and twelve were taken prisoner. Müller was determined to penalise the inhabitants of Anogeia for having been a centre of resistance for many years, having attacked and killed the German Forced Labour column, providing shelter to the Kreipe abduction team and participating in the Damasta sabotage.

"ORDER BY THE GERMAN GENERAL COMMANDER OF THE GARRISON OF CRETE – "Because the town of Anogia is the centre of the English Intelligence on Crete, because the people of Anogia committed the murder of the Sergeant Commander of the Yeni-Gave, as well as of the garrison under his orders, because the people of Anogia carried out the sabotage of Damasta, because in Anogia the guerrillas of the various groups of resistance take refuge and find protection and because it was through Anogia that the kidnappers with General Von Kreipe passed using Anogia as a transit camp, we order its COMPLETE DESTRUCTION and the execution of every male person of Anogia who would happen to be within the village and around it within a distance of one kilometre" CHANEA 13TH AUGUST 1944, THE GENERAL COMMANDER OF THE GARRISON OF CRETE, H. MULLER.

The British military historian Antony Beevor and the German historian Gottfried Schramm explained the wave of German reprisals across Crete that followed the Kreipe operation as unconnected to Kreipe's abduction. Beevor and Schramm saw the terror campaign across the island, including the Holocaust of Kedros from 22 August and the separate Razing of Anogeia from 13 August, as a means to facilitate the planned German evacuation from much of the island to the stronghold of Chania. by aiming to cow the Cretans.

Grouping their forces around Chania, the Germans remained trapped until the end of the war, refusing to surrender to the Greek army, for fear of retaliation. They eventually surrendered to the British on 23 May 1945.

The Holocaust of Kedros was an operation involving 2,000 Axis soldiers who targeted the Kedros villages namely Gerakari, Gourgouthi, Kardaki, Vryses, Smiles, Drygies, Ano Meros, and Chordaki. The nearby village of Krya Vrysi (Κρύα Βρύση) was also attacked. A total of 900 houses were burned, 50 civilians were shot and 3,500 became internally displaced. In the following days the operation expanded to other villages, men were executed, houses were looted and then burned or dynamited regardless of their involvement in resistance activities. Local resistance bands could do nothing but watch, being vastly outnumbered.

Müller was convicted for these and other war crimes. He was sentenced to death on 9 December 1946 and executed by firing squad 20 May 1947.

== Propaganda exploitation ==
While SOE planned and executed the abduction, the Political Warfare Executive (PWE)—the clandestine British body responsible for psychological warfare—managed the subsequent propaganda campaign. The two organisations had operated separately since August 1941, when propaganda functions were removed from SOE and placed under Foreign Office control.

Allied propaganda portrayed the kidnapping as a cover story for Kreipe's voluntary defection, suggesting he had fled to the Allies from disillusionment with the Nazi regime. This disinformation aimed to undermine confidence in the loyalty of senior German officers. The Germans did not publicly credit the defection narrative; however, the arrest of Kreipe's aide-de-camp and guards on suspicion of complicity suggests the operation succeeded in creating distrust within the garrison.

== Biographical works ==
These events were portrayed in Moss's autobiographical book Ill Met by Moonlight: The Abduction of General Kreipe. In 1957, the book was turned into the film starring Dirk Bogarde, David Oxley and Marius Goring. Leigh Fermor and Psychoundakis also recounted their experiences in the respective biographical works Abducting a General: The Kreipe Operation and SOE in Crete and The Cretan Runner: His Story of the German Occupation.
