= Sophie Moss =

Polish humanitarian, noblewoman, organiser and translator

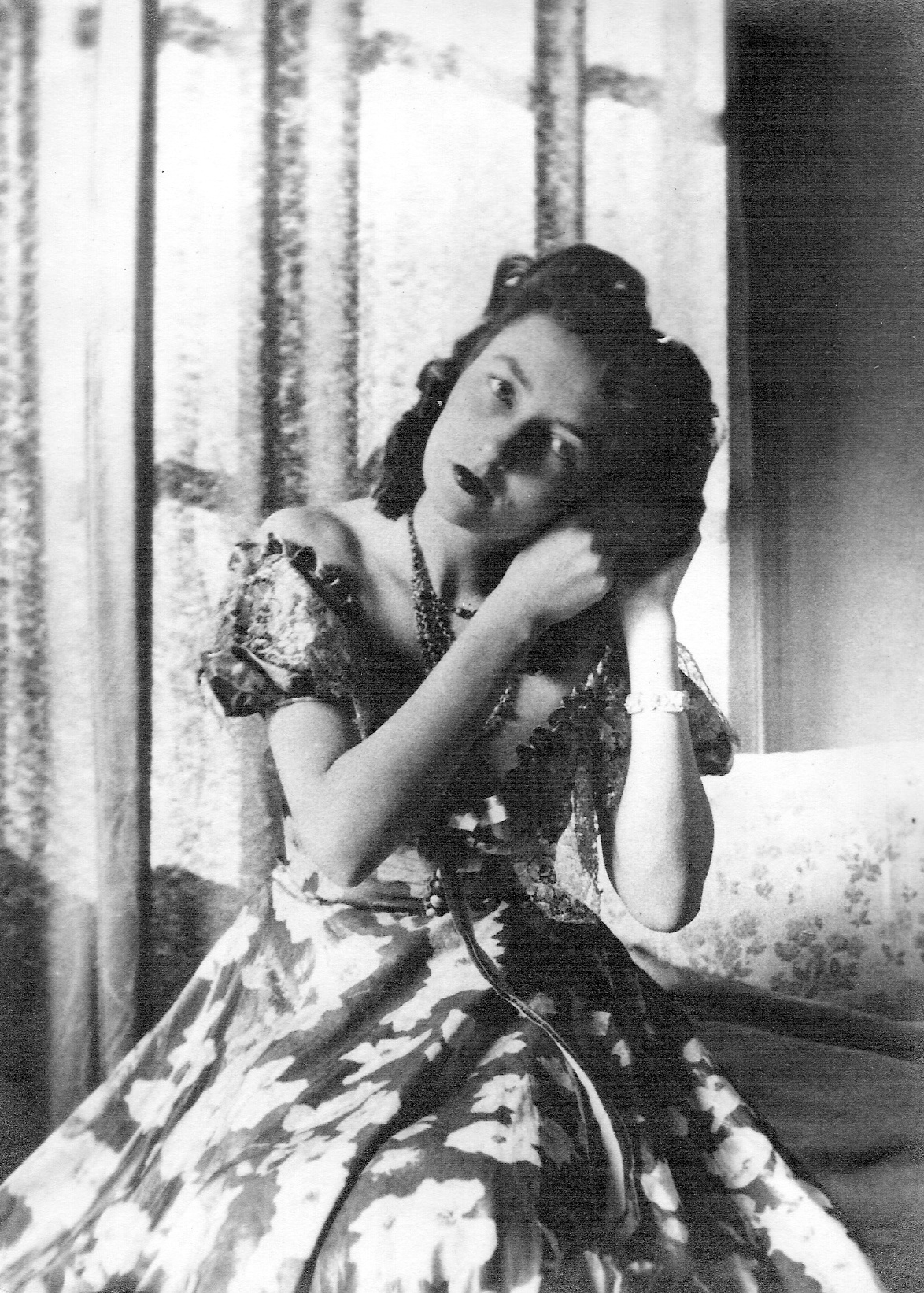
Sophie Tarnowska Moss

Sophie Moss (born Zofia Roza Maria Jadwiga Elzbieta Katarzyna Aniela Tarnowska; 16 March 1917 – 22 November 2009) was a Polish noblewoman and World War II organiser. At the request of Władysław Sikorski, Poland's wartime leader, she founded the Cairo branch of the Polish Red Cross.

== Early life ==
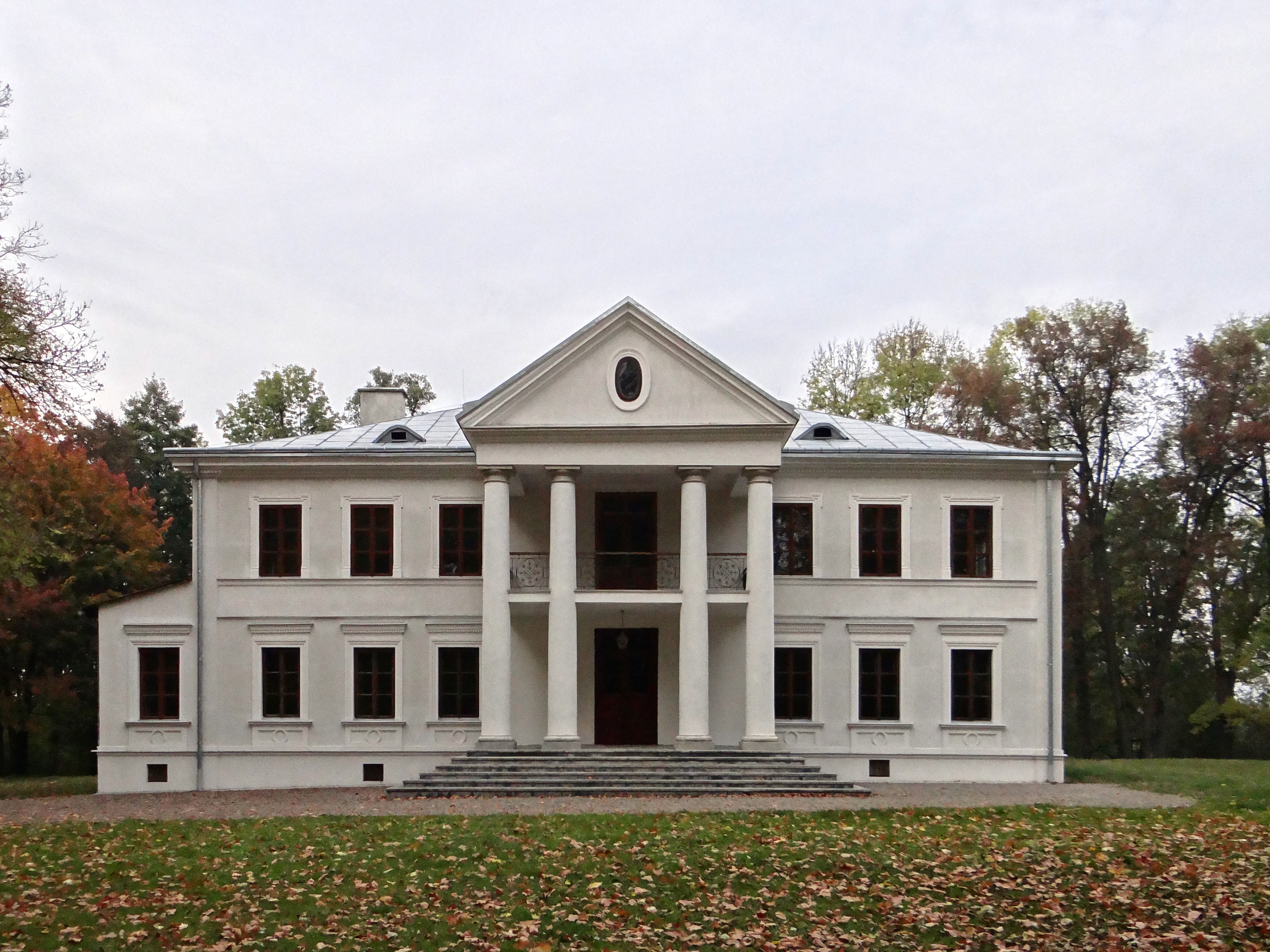
Tarnowski Palace in Rudnik nad Sanem

Moss was born on 16 March 1917 in Rudnik nad Sanem.

Her father was a politician and a writer named Hieronim. Her grandfather was Stanisław Tarnowski, who was a professor and rector at Jagiellonian University in Kraków. Moss was also a possible direct descendant of Catherine the Great and her family held some of the highest offices in Poland.

In 1937, she married Andrew Tarnowski, a member of the senior branch of the family. Her first son died in July 1939 before the age of two.

== World War II ==
=== Invasion ===
At the outbreak of war, Tarnowska and her husband left their home to the front where Poland was fighting against the Germans. She burnt her passport as a gesture of commitment to never leaving Polish soil. Tarnowska and her companions, including her brother Stanislaw, after spending two weeks travelling Poland by car, finally resigned themselves to cross the border into Romania, reaching Bucharest as the Soviet invasion progressed from the east. As sympathy for the Nazi cause grew in Bucharest, they left for Belgrade. They traveled through the Balkans, where their second baby son died. They traveled to Mandatory Palestine, where their marriage broke down.

Separated from her husband, Tarnowska left Palestine and travelled to Cairo, where she and her sister-in-law were welcomed by Prince Youssef Kamal ed-Dine (a visitor to Poland before the War). She began working for the International Red Cross, tracing missing Allied soldiers. General Sikorski, the Polish Prime Minister-in-Exile and Commander-in-Chief, visited Cairo in November 1941. At his request, Tarnowska set up the Cairo branch of the Polish Red Cross with the help of Lady Lampson, wife of Sir Miles Lampson, the British Ambassador, and Sir Duncan Mackenzie of the British Red Cross. She became friends with King Farouk and Queen Farida.

Tarnowska was living at the National Hotel as Erwin Rommel's troops advanced into Egypt in June 1942 after the fall of Tobruk. Cairo was evacuated, and many of her contemporaries left for Palestine, but she refused to leave and carried on working for the Polish Red Cross until she was ordered to leave for Palestine by the Polish Legation. She refused and instead set off for the front in Alexandria, to be near the troops of the First Battle of El Alamein. There she stayed in a hotel as the only guest, all others having fled. As Rommel's advance was halted, Tarnowska returned to Cairo in July 1942 to welcome the returning evacuees.

=== Tara ===
In 1943, Tarnowska moved into a villa on Gezira Island rented by W. Stanley Moss, with a group of British SOE officers including:

- W. Stanley Moss
- Xan Fielding
- Arnold Breene
- Arthur Reade
- Patrick Leigh Fermor
- Billy McLean
- David Smiley
- Rowland Winn

The villa was dubbed "Tara" by its occupants – after Hill of Tara, mythical home of the High Kings of Ireland. It became a centre for entertaining diplomats, officers, writers, lecturers, war correspondents, and local party-goers, hosted by Tarnowska, in the guise of "Princess Dnieper-Petrovsk" with:

- McLean as "Sir Eustace Rapier"
- Smiley as "the Marquis of Whipstock"
- Winn as "the Hon. Rupert Sabretache"
- Fielding as "Lord Hughe Devildrive"
- Breene as "Lord Pintpot"
- Leigh Fermor as "Lord Rakehell"
- Moss as "Mr Jack Jargon"

Tarnowska used experience liqueur-making on her father's estates to produce the party drinks. By the winter of 1944, the owner of the damaged property secured the eviction of the occupants, who moved into a flat.

== Family ==
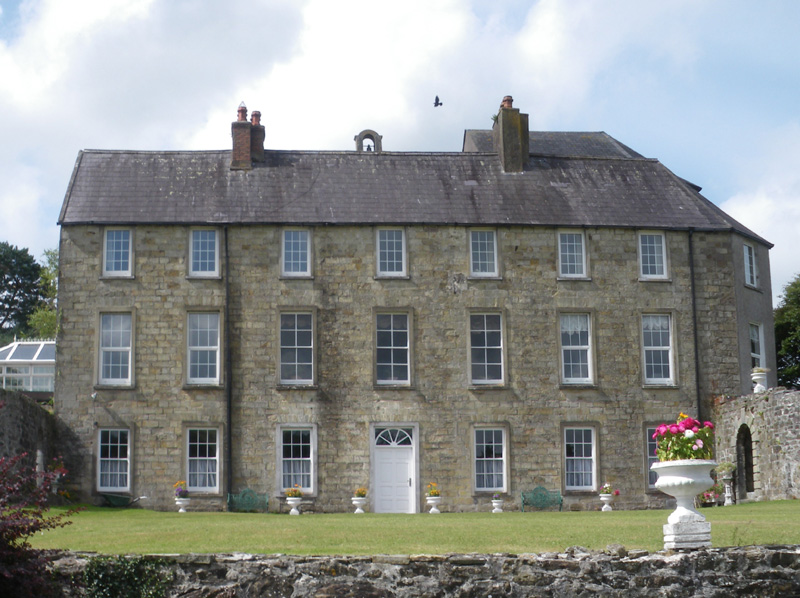
Riverstown House, County Cork.

In 1945, she married W. Stanley Moss. He had fought with the Eighth Army in the North African campaign before joining the Special Operations Executive based in Cairo. He is best known for the kidnapping of Heinrich Kreipe to Egypt in April and May 1944. He became a best-selling author in the 1950s.

They had three children, Christine Isabelle Mercedes, named after their mutual friend and former SOE agent Krystyna Skarbek (Christine Granville), Sebastian (who died in infancy), and Gabriella Zofia. Initially living in London, they moved to Riverstown House, County Cork in Ireland. They later returned to London, Putney, but separated in 1957. Moss died in 1965 in Kingston, Jamaica.

=== Visit to Poland ===
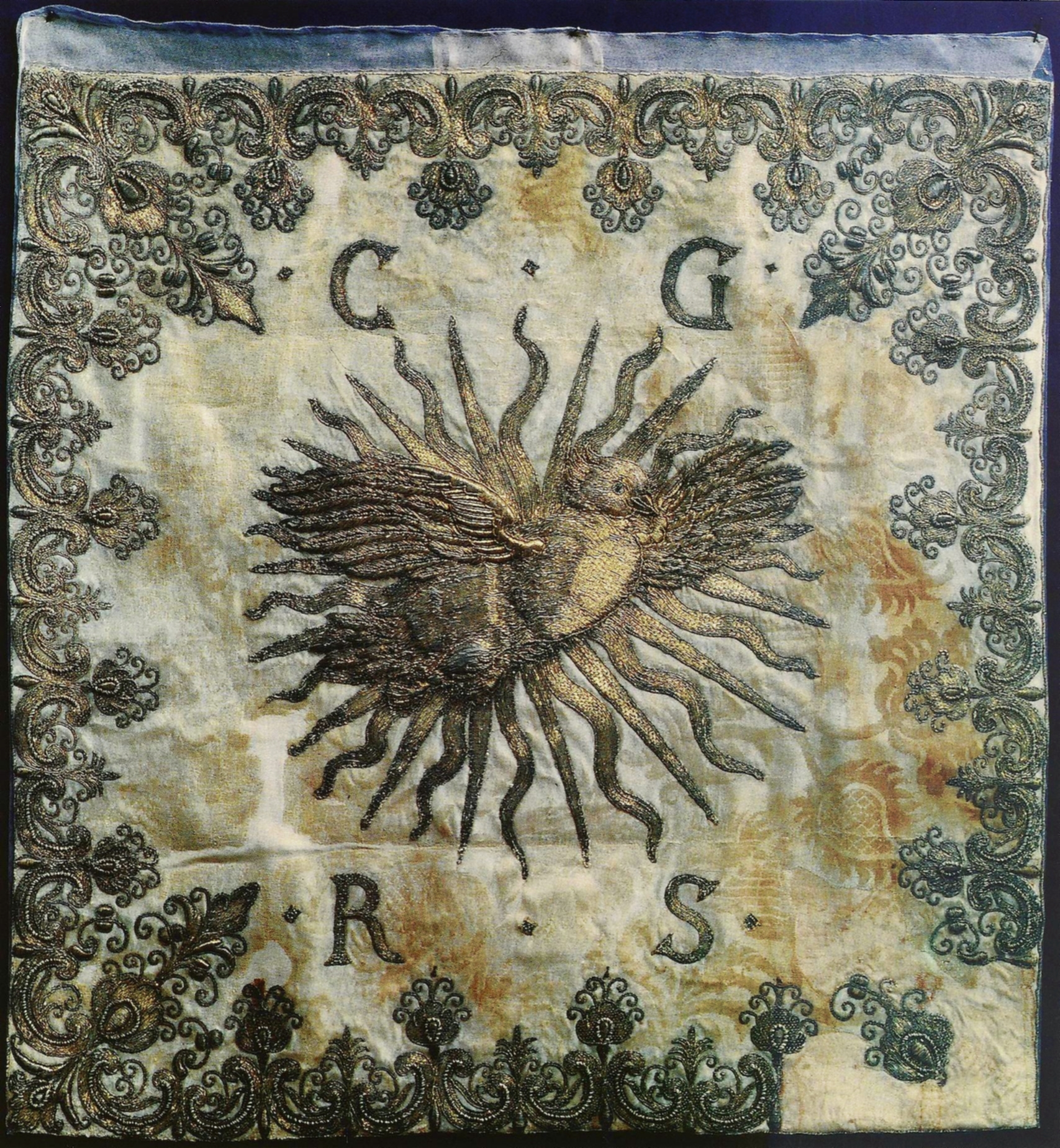
The 1654 proporzec of Charles X Gustav of Sweden donated in 1957 by Zofia Tarnowska-Moss and her brother, Stanisław, to the Wawel Royal Castle National Art Collection

When Tarnowska left her father's home in 1939, he gave her the personal seventeenth-century jack ("proporzec"), of King Karl Gustav of Sweden, a trophy won at his army's defeat on the Tarnowski estate during the Deluge. In 1957, she and her brother Stanislaw, also living in London, decided to donate the flag to the Wawel Art Collection in Kraków, where it remains. The government highlighted the cultural event and granted the visiting party visas, but Tarnowska declined the offers of expenses-paid travel and hospitality. The siblings paid their own expenses and were allowed to revisit Rudnik.

After the fall of the Polish People's Republic, Tarnowska's nephew was able to buy back Rudnik, dilapidated and then gradually restored. She and her brother were later able to host several family gatherings on the estate in Poland.

=== Later years ===
For much of the latter part of her life, she lived in London and spent her summer months in Ireland.

== Publications ==
- Schulz, Bruno, transl. by W. Stanley Moss and Zofia Tarnowska Moss. "My father joins the fire brigade". Edmund Ordon (1958). 10 Contemporary Polish Stories. Detroit: Wayne State University Press. OCLC 297276.
