= W. Stanley Moss =

British army officer, writer, broadcaster, journalist and traveller

W. Stanley Moss MC
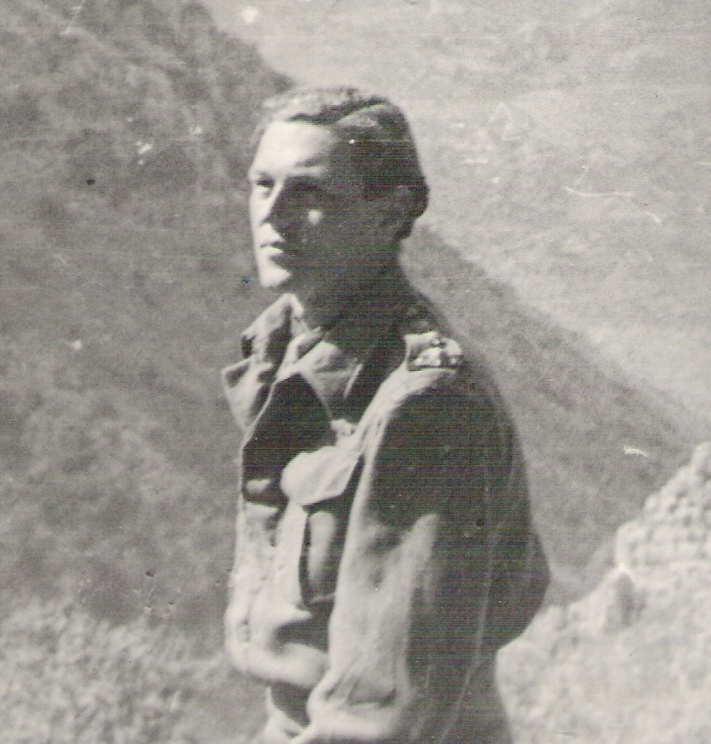
- Moss in Crete (1944)
- Born: Ivan William Stanley Moss; 15 June 1921; Yokohama, Japan
- Died: 9 August 1965 (aged 44); Kingston, Jamaica
- Other name: Billy
- Occupations: Soldier, writer and traveller
- Spouse: Zofia Tarnowska
- Writing career
- Notable works: Ill Met by Moonlight; A War of Shadows
- Military career
- Branch: British Army
- Years: 1940–1946
- Rank: Major
- Units: Coldstream Guards; Special Operations Executive
- Wars: World War II
- Awards: Military Cross

Ivan William Stanley Moss MC (15 June 1921 – 9 August 1965), commonly known as W. Stanley Moss or Billy Moss, was a British army officer in World War II, and later a successful writer, broadcaster, journalist, and traveller. He served with the Coldstream Guards and the Special Operations Executive (SOE) and is best known for the Kidnap of General Kreipe. He was a best-selling author in the 1950s, based on his novels and books about his wartime service. His SOE years are featured in Ill Met by Moonlight: The Abduction of General Kreipe, (also adapted as a British film released under the main title) and A War of Shadows. Moss travelled around the world, including Antarctica to meet the Commonwealth Trans-Antarctic Expedition.

A biography, Billy Moss: Soldier, Writer, Traveller - A Brief Life by Alan Ogden, was published in 2014 as an Afterword to A War of Shadows. An abbreviated text was published in the Coldstream Gazette 2018.

== Early life and education ==
Moss was born in Yokohama, Japan. His mother, Natalie Galitch (born in Nikolsk-Ussuriyskiy), was a White Russian émigrée, and his father, William Stanley Moss, an English businessman and steel merchant in Japan. They married on 22 September 1916. The family survived the 1923 Great Kantō earthquake. Moss attended Charterhouse in England (1934–39).

His uncle, Sir George Sinclair Moss (1882-1959), a British diplomat in China, also served the Special Operations Executive as adviser on Chinese affairs during the Second World War.

== Soldier ==
In the autumn of 1939, Moss, aged 18, had just left Charterhouse and was living in a log cabin on the Latvian coast. By the outbreak of war, he reached Stockholm, and succeeded in crossing the North Sea to England in a yacht. After full training at Caterham, he was commissioned as an ensign into the Coldstream Guards in July 1941. He served on King's Guard at the Court of St. James's punctuated by bouts of Churchillian duty at Chequers.

Posted to reinforce the 3rd Battalion the Coldstream, after the losses at Tobruk, Moss fought between October 1942 and July 1943 with Montgomery's Eighth Army chasing Rommel across North Africa after Alamein. In the aftermath of Operation Corkscrew, his battalion was then sent to garrison Pantelleria. He returned to Cairo, where he volunteered to join Force 133 of the Special Operations Executive (SOE) on 24 September 1943.

=== Tara, Cairo ===
In 1943 in Cairo, Moss moved into a spacious villa, with a great ballroom with parquet floors, which four or five people might share. Moss chose to live in the villa rather than the SOE hostel, "Hangover Hall". He moved in alone at first, then bought his Alsatian puppy, Pixie. Then, Xan Fielding, who had served in Crete, joined him. Next was Countess Zofia (Sophie) Tarnowska, forced to leave Poland in 1939 by the German invasion, followed by Arnold Breene of SOE HQ. Finally Patrick Leigh Fermor, an SOE officer who had spent the previous nine months in Crete, joined the household. The villa's new inhabitants called it Tara, after the legendary home of the High Kings of Ireland.

Sophie Tarnowska and two other women had been asked to share the house with the SOE agents, but only she went through with it, after the men pleaded with her not to let them down. Estranged from her husband, she moved in with her few possessions (a bathing costume, an evening gown, a uniform and two pet mongooses). She protected her reputation while living in the all-male household by the invention of an entirely fictitious chaperone, "Madame Khayatt", who suffered from "distressingly poor health" and was always indisposed when visitors asked after her. The group were later joined by SOE agents Billy McLean, David Smiley returning from Albania, and Rowland Winn (later Lord St. Oswald), also active in Albania.

Tara became the centre of high-spirited entertaining of diplomats, officers, writers, lecturers, war correspondents and Coptic and Levantine party-goers. The residents adopted nicknames: "Princess Dnieper-Petrovsk" (Countess Sophie Tarnowska), "Sir Eustace Rapier" (Lt-Col. Neil (Billy) McLean), "the Marquis of Whipstock" (Col David Smiley LVO OBE MC), "the Hon, Rupert Sabretache" (Rowland Winn MC), "Lord Hughe Devildrive" (Major Xan Fielding DSO), "Lord Pintpot" (Arnold Breene), "Lord Rakehell" (Lt-Col Patrick Leigh-Fermor DSO) and "Mr Jack Jargon"(Capt W. Stanley Moss MC). By the winter of 1944, the Tara household had to leave their battered villa and move into a flat. Their landlord secured their eviction on the grounds that the villa had not been let to "Princess Dnieper-Petrovsk" et al., as stated on the villa's name plate.

=== Abduction of General Kreipe, Crete ===
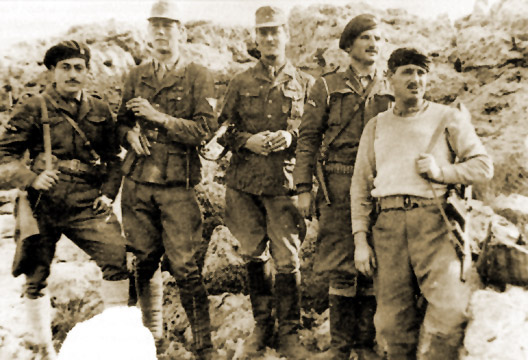
Georgios Tyrakis, Moss, Leigh Fermor, Emmanouil Paterakis, Antonios Papaleonidas.

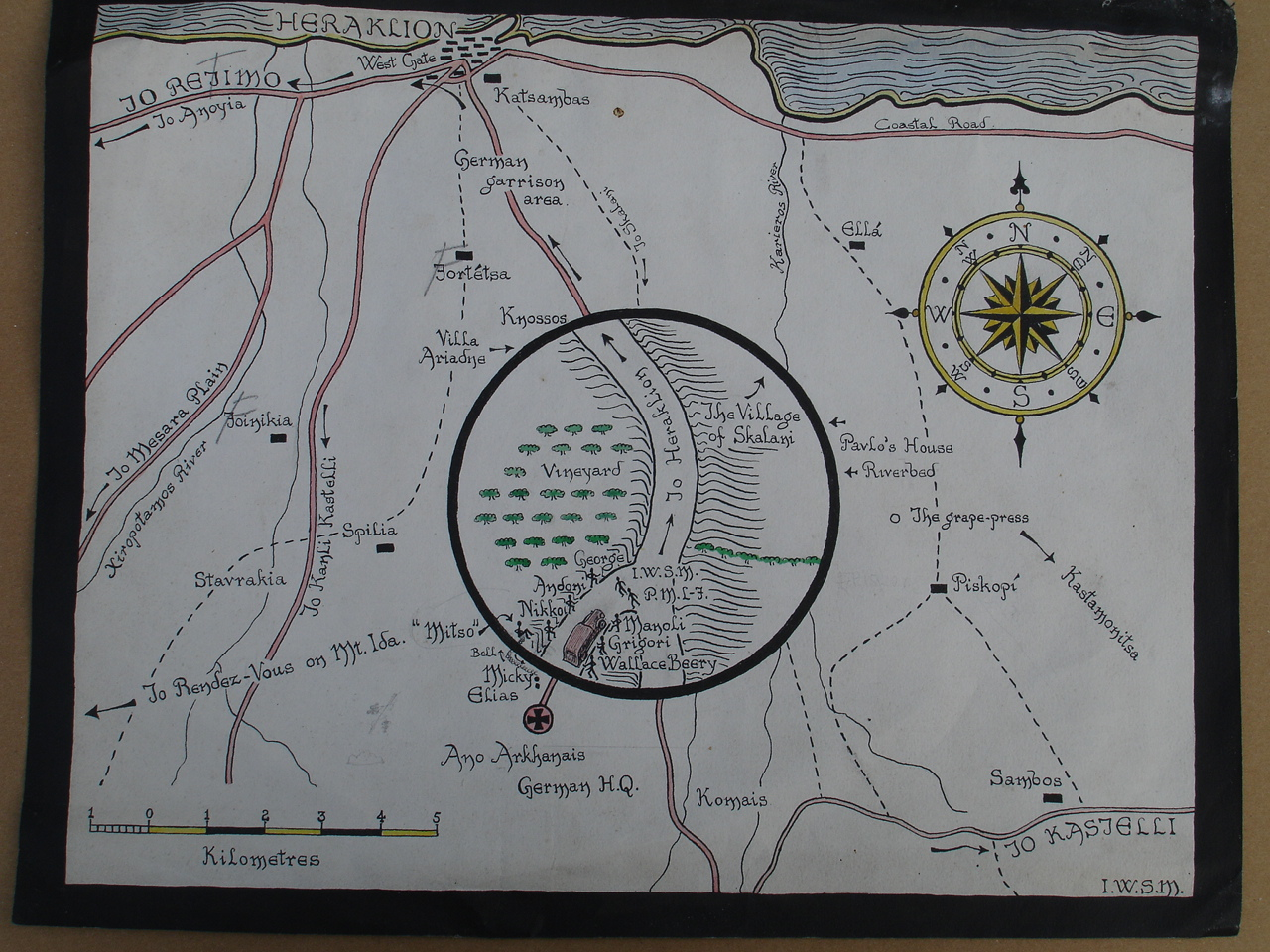
W. Stanley Moss's drawing of Kreipe Abduction Point

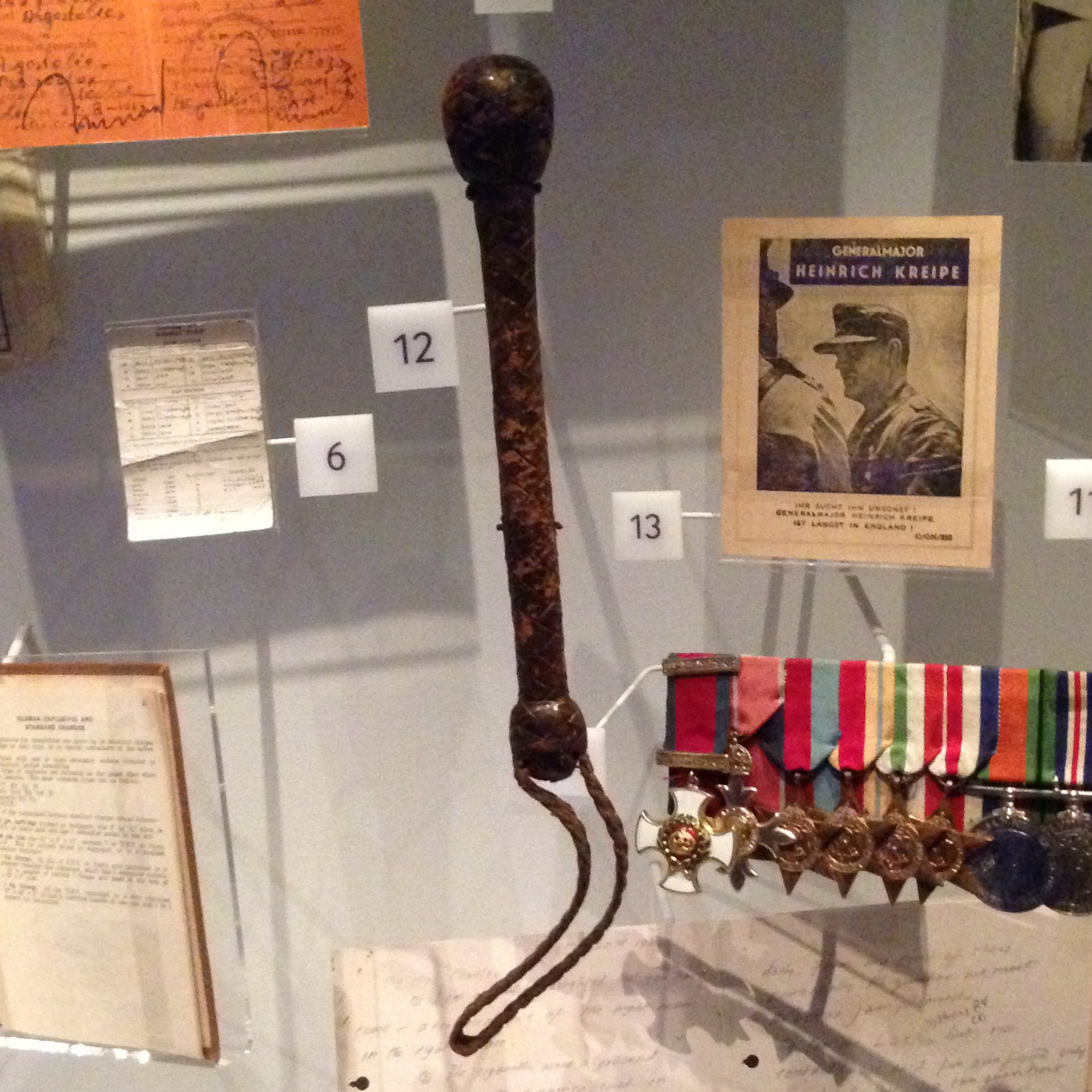
William Stanley Moss's Cosh used in the Abduction of General Heinrich Kreipe, 1944 – Held by Imperial War Museums

Moss is best remembered for Operation 'BRICKLAYER', the capture of General Heinrich Kreipe on Crete and abduction of him to Egypt, in April and May 1944. Leigh Fermor (Philidem), with Moss (Dimitri) as his second-in-command, led a team of Cretan Andartes, part of the Greek resistance.

Moss and Leigh Fermor thought of the Kreipe abduction one evening in the Club Royale de Chasse et de Pêche (Royal Hunting and Fishing Club) and planned it during the winter of 1943. On the last evening before Moss and Leigh Fermor set off, Smiley presented Moss with the Oxford Book of English Verse – his companion from Albania – for good luck. McLean gave him a complete Shakespeare dedicated, "To Bill, with best of luck for Guernsey, Bill".

Promoted to the rank of captain, at age 22 Moss set off with Leigh Fermor, age 29, to Crete in 1944. Leigh Fermor landed by parachute. Moss, unable to jump due to cloud cover, followed several weeks later, landing on 4 April 1944 by boat on the south coast where he joined Leigh Fermor, Andartes and other support (using the cover name of 'Dimitrios'). Walking north, they passed through Skinias, Kastamonitsa and Haraso. Just south of Skalani, they prepared for the abduction. Throughout the operation, as they travelled across Crete, they were hidden and supported by the Resistance and the local population.

Moss and Leigh Fermor, disguised as German soldiers, stopped the General's car. With the help of their team, the driver was knocked out by Moss with his cosh and the General and car seized. With Leigh Fermor impersonating the General, and Moss his driver, and with the General bundled in the back, secured by their Cretan team, Moss drove the General's car for an hour and a half through 22 controlled road blocks in Heraklion. Leigh Fermor took the car on, as Moss walked with the general south into the mountains to Anogeia and up towards Psiloritis. Reunited, the entire abduction team took the general on over the summit of Psiloritis before descending, aiming for the coast. Driven west by German forces cutting off escape to the south, they travelled to Gerakari and on to Patsos. From here, they walked on through Fotinos and Vilandredo before striking south, finally to escape by HMS Motor Launch ML 842 (commanded by Brian Coleman) on 14 May 1944 from Peristeres Beach, west of Rodakino.

After the war, a member of Kreipe's staff reported that, on hearing the news of the kidnapping, an uneasy silence in the officers' mess in Heraklion was followed by someone saying, "Well gentlemen, I think this calls for champagne all round."

Post-war correspondence explains that Kreipe was disliked by his soldiers because, amongst other things, he objected to the stopping of his own vehicle for checking in compliance with his commands concerning troops' reviewing approved travel orders. This tension between the General and his troops, in part, explains the reluctance of sentries to stop the General's car as Moss drove it through Heraklion.

The episode was immortalised in his best-selling book Ill Met by Moonlight (1950). It was adapted into a film of the same name, directed and produced by Michael Powell and released in 1957. It featured Dirk Bogarde as Patrick Leigh Fermor and David Oxley as Moss.

The abduction is commemorated near Archanes and at Patsos.

=== Damasta Sabotage, Crete ===
Returning to Crete on 6 July 1944, Moss led a resistance group consisting of eight Cretans and six escaped Russian POW soldiers in launching an ambush on German forces, intent on attacking Anogeia, on the main road connecting Rethymno and Heraklion. He chose an ambush site by a bridge in the Damastos location, one kilometre west of the village of Damasta. After the team destroyed various passing vehicles, among which was a lorry carrying military mail to Chania, the German force intending to target Anogeia finally appeared. It consisted of a truck of infantrymen backed up by an armoured car. Moss and his group attacked the troops. He destroyed the armoured car by crawling up behind it and dropping a grenade into the hatch. In total, 40 to 50 German and Axis troops were killed in the clash that followed as well as 1 Russian partisan. He left Crete on 18 August 1944. The operation, for which a bar to his Military Cross was recommended, is described in full in Moss's book A War of Shadows and commemorated at Damasta. Moss's exploits in Crete are recorded in the Historical Museum of Crete.

=== Greece ===
Moss served in Greece between September and November 1944, during which time he was promoted to the rank of major on 24 October. He participated in an operation alongside Major Ken Scott, with the objective of sabotaging the railway bridge over the Aliakmon River to disrupt German troop movements in and out of Thessaloniki. Due to heavy rainfall causing the river to overflow its banks, Moss was unable to execute the final part of the plan to destroy a section of the bridge. He continued to engage in sabotage activities aimed at impeding the German withdrawal.

Subsequently, Moss returned to Britain for reassignment on 30 January 1945. Despite being assigned regimental duties, he sought to rejoin special operations. Taking a 28-day leave in Cairo from 6 March 1945, he chose this time to marry.

=== Thailand ===
He was then posted to join Force 136 in Thailand (to which Moss referred by its historic name of Siam) arriving from Cairo on 25 June 1945 to stay at the Grand Hotel, in Calcutta. Joining Major Ken Scott as Jedburgh team leader and Capt. John Hibberdine (W/T) for Operation Sungod, he flew out of Jessore on 22 August by Dakota landing by parachute in a drop zone by a river, south of Bandon in the Bandon Nakon Sri Tamaraj area. The team's orders included establishing communication with HQ (W/T station Gaberdine), liaising with the Thailand 6th Independent Division, identifying all POW camps, finding locations for drop zones and seaplane landings and preparing to demolish the tunnel on the railway from Chong Khao and Ron Phibun, east to Tunsong, as also described in his book A War of Shadows. The Mission arranged the orderly surrender of Japanese forces in their area of operations, before Moss left in November 1945

On 25 January 1946, he joined Operation Python. He was discharged on 21 November 1946.

== Wartime honours ==
- Military Cross (MC)

Moss was recommended for and received the Immediate Award of the Military Cross following the Kreipe abduction.

23 May 1944 Recommendation for MC.

This officer showed exceptional gallantry in taking part, with Major Leigh Fermor, in the organization and execution of the kidnapping of Major-General Kreipe at Arkhanes, Crete on 26 April 1944. It was due to Captain Moss's swiftness in attacking the General's car that the operation was made possible.

In the early stages of the kidnapping, Capt. Moss impersonated the chauffeur of the General's car and for an hour and a half drove "the General" through Heraklion and passed 22 controlled road blocks before the car was finally abandoned. Subsequently Capt. Moss assisted in moving the General during a period of 17 days through enemy held territory.

For outstanding courage and audacity Capt. Moss is recommended for the Immediate Award of the MC.

== Marriage and family ==
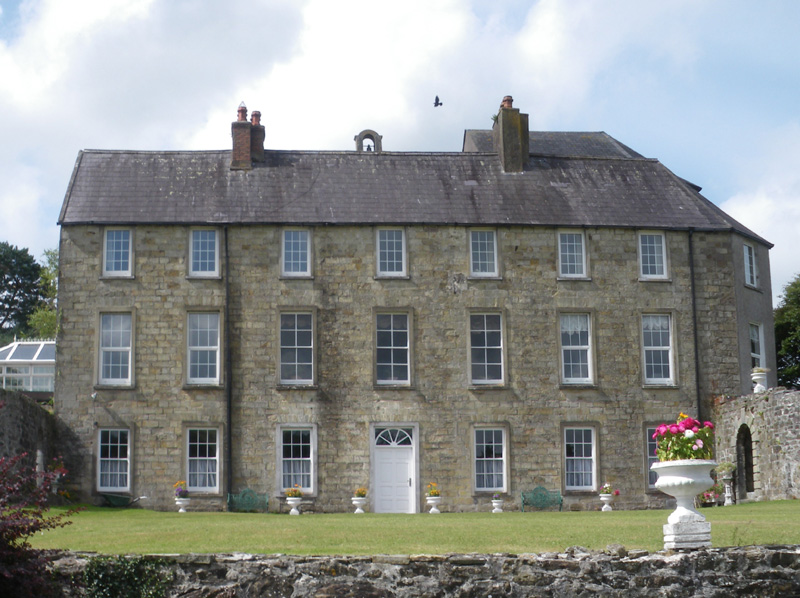
Riverstown House, County Cork

In Cairo, on 26 April 1945, Moss married Countess Zofia Tarnowska, his former housemate. She was the granddaughter of Count Stanislaw Tarnowski (1837–1917) and a direct descendant of Catherine the Great of Russia. Their witnesses were Prince Peter of Greece and Major the Hon Peter Pleydell-Bouverie KRRC. The reception was held at the house of Princess Emina Toussoun.

They had three children: Christine Isabelle Mercedes, named after their mutual friend and former SOE agent Krystyna Skarbek (Christine Granville), Sebastian (who died in infancy) and Gabriella. Initially living in London, they moved to Riverstown House, County Cork in Ireland. They later returned to London. They separated in 1957.

== Writer and traveller ==
Moss achieved success as an author with three novels, as well as his two books based on his wartime adventures. In addition, he travelled to Germany and wrote an investigation of post-war Germany, studying what happened to gold accumulated by the Nazis: Gold Is Where You Hide It: What Happened to the Reichsbank Treasure? (1956).

=== Disappearance of Reichsbank and Abwehr reserves ===
Between 1952 and 1954, Moss joined up with his friend and former SOE agent, Andrzej Kowerski – who adopted his cover name, Andrew Kennedy, after the war – to investigate a mystery of the final days of the Third Reich. In April and May 1945, the remaining reserves of the Reichsbank – gold (730 bars), cash (6 large sacks), and precious stones and metals such as platinum (25 sealed boxes) – were dispatched by Walther Funk to be buried on the Klausenhof Mountain at Einsiedl in Bavaria, where the final German resistance was to be concentrated. Similarly the Abwehr cash reserves were hidden nearby in Garmisch-Partenkirchen. Shortly after the American forces overran the area, the reserves and money disappeared.

Moss and Kennedy travelled back and forth across Germany and into Switzerland and corresponded with fugitives in Argentina, to research what had happened. They talked to many witnesses before finally establishing what had become of the treasure. What Moss and Kennedy uncovered, and the conclusions they reached on the various people responsible for the disappearances, have not been disputed to this day. The disappearance of Major Martin Borg, the US Military Governor of Garmisch-Partenkirchen at the time, has not been explained.

Later, Moss and Kennedy went on to uncover the consequences of Heinrich Himmler's order of 28 October 1939, which confirmed the Lebensborn programme. They researched what had become of the children born as a result of the order.

=== Antarctica ===
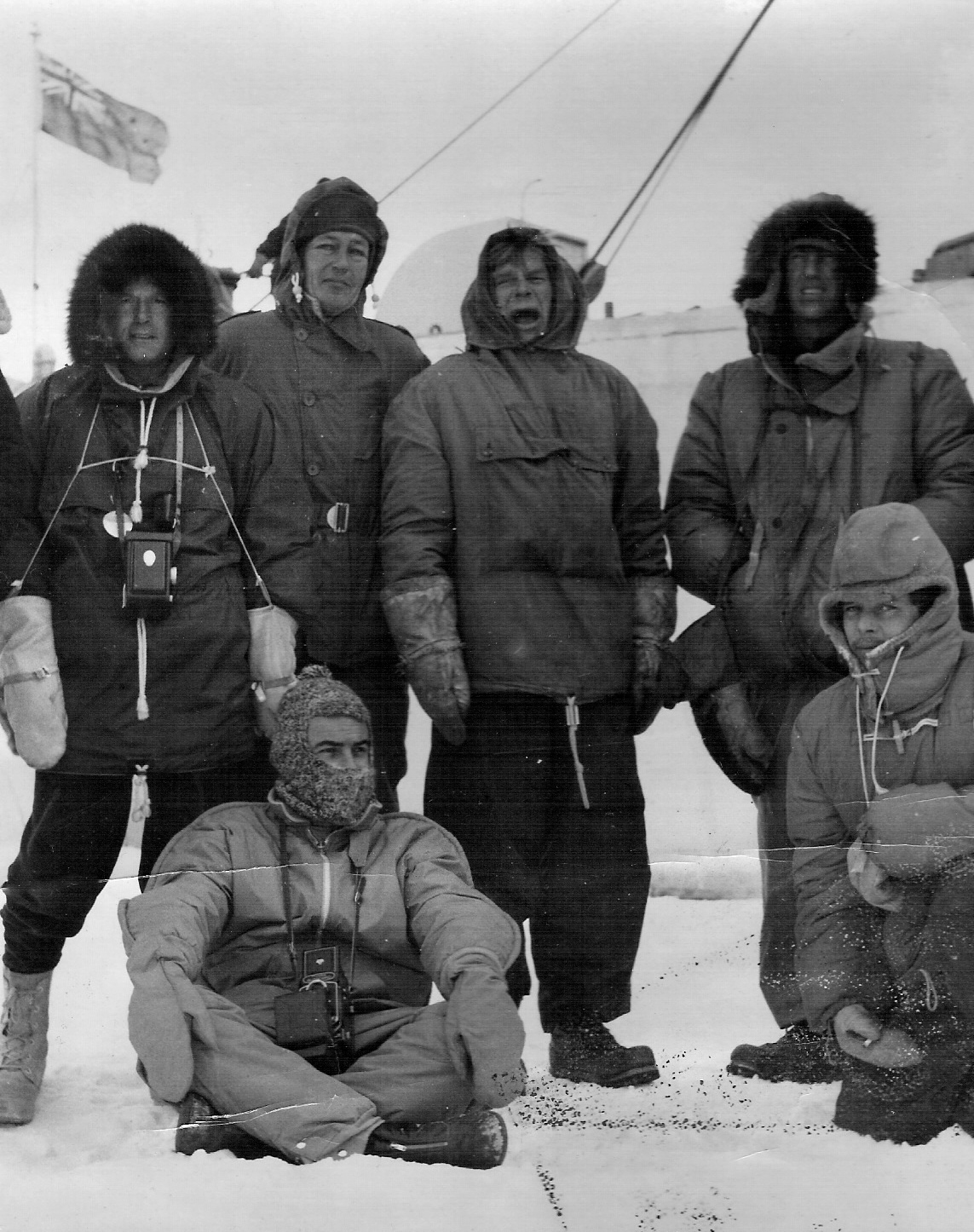
Moss behind Fuchs, Hillary and others, Scott Base, Antarctica, 1958

Moss arrived in Christchurch, New Zealand on 9 January 1958, at the request of Lord Tedder, chairman of the management council of the 1958 Polar Air Rescue Expedition in London. Moss was to lead a British expedition in May to the North Pole, to evolve a rescue organization for commercial airlines flying the Polar route.

The United States Naval Support Unit, based in New Zealand for Operation Deep Freeze III, were, thus, requested to fly Moss to the Pole the following day in order to undertake a parachute jump over the Antarctic. He planned to jump from 3,000 feet from an aircraft moving at 200 mph, the air being too thin for the aircraft to fly any slower. Given the intermittent failure of parachutes during supply drops to the Antarctic, Moss intended to take two parachutes.

In the event, there was not enough space on the flight so he flew on 24 January 1958, with 3 other passengers, in a Globemaster aircraft (with one engine cutting out six hours from his destination) to Scott Base at McMurdo Sound, Antarctica to report on the arrival of the first Antarctic crossing achieved by the Commonwealth Trans-Antarctic Expedition in 1957-8 led by Vivian Fuchs and Edmund Hillary.

By mid-February with melting ice and the loss of the ice landing strip floating out to sea, air access ceased.

The expedition arrived at Scott Base on 2 March 1958, and Moss's report was published in the Sunday Pictorial the following day. On 4 March, Moss attended the celebratory dinner with Fuchs, Hillary, David Stratton, George Lowe, Geoffrey Pratt, Harold Lister, George Marsh, George Lowe, Hannes La Grange, Jon Stephenson, Allan Rogers, Joseph "Bob" Miller, John Lewis, Ralph Lenton and 2 others.

He left in mid-March 1958 returning to New Zealand on the American armour plated icebreaker, USS Glacier.

=== Sailing the Pacific ===
Taking to sea from New Zealand again, he sailed with Bill Endean, Rex Hill, Warwick Davies (aged 19), John Ewing (aged 19) in Endeans's 47 ft Alden-rigged Malabar ketch, the Crusader, through the islands of the Pacific to Tahiti. Here the crew split up and Moss joined the crew of the 50-ft motorsailer Manawanui from Tahiti to Nassau, Bahamas. Tig Lowe was skipper, Howard "Bones" Kanter was navigator, and other crew members were two New Zealanders. They stopped at Mangareva, where Moss and Lowe put on a boxing exhibition - much to the delight of the islanders. They sailed on to the Pitcairn Islands, Easter Island, the Galapagos Islands and Panama, eventually landing at Nassau in December 1959.

=== Jamaica ===
Moss moved on to Kingston, Jamaica, where he settled. He died there of stomach cancer on 9 August 1965, aged 44. He was buried at the Garrison Church in Kingston on Friday 13 August. Two buglers from the 1st Battalion The Jamaica Regiment sounded Last Post and Reveille over his coffin which was draped in the Union Jack. A simple rock of red and white mottled Jamaican marble was erected over his grave with the inscription In loving memory of William Stanley Moss, A Soldier, A Writer, A Traveller.

== Works ==
=== Books ===
- The Hour of Flight. London; Toronto: Harrap. 1949. OCLC 63014078.
- Ill Met by Moonlight. London: Harrap. 1950. OL 1839417W.
- Bats with Baby Faces. London: Boardman. 1951. OL 1839411W.
- A War of Shadows. London: Boardman. 1952. OL 1839416W.
- Three Plagues. London: Boardman. 1953.
- Gold Is Where You Hide It; What Happened to the Reichsbank Treasure?. London: Andre Deutsch. 1956. OCLC 2828923. OL 12084151W.

=== Short stories ===
- "The Zombie of Alto Parana" London Mystery Magazine #6 (1950)
- "I Hate Violence" London Mystery Magazine #10 (1951)
- "Body in the Wine" London Mystery Magazine #13 (1952)
- "The High Toby" (Part I) London Mystery Magazine #14 (1952)
- "Carriage for One" London Mystery Magazine #15 (1952)
- "The High Toby" (Part II) London Mystery Magazine #16 (1952)
- "The High Toby" (Part III) London Mystery Magazine #18 (1953)
- "The Man with Flat Feet" Lilliput Magazine (June 1957)

=== Teleplays ===
- Assignment Foreign Legion - The Thin Line - broadcast on 19 October 1956 in the UK and on 3 December 1957 in the USA

=== Translations ===
- Schulz, Bruno (1958). "My father joins the fire brigade'". In Ordon, Edmund (ed.). 10 Contemporary Polish Stories. Translated by Moss, W. Stanley; Moss, Zofia Tarnowska. Detroit: Wayne State University Press. OCLC 297276.

== The William Stanley Moss Prizes ==
The Prizes are awarded annually by the Faculty of Philosophy of the University of Crete to students in the Department of Philology and Department of History and Archaeology. The prizes were created to honour the Cretans, in Moss's name, and as an expression of gratitude and debt to the Cretan people. The prizes were founded by his daughter, Gabriella, in 2014, the 70th anniversary of Moss's wartime missions to Crete, and were first awarded in July 2015.

== See also ==
- Sophie Moss
