= Doundoulakis =

Doundoulakis is a surname. Notable people with the surname include:

- George Doundoulakis (1921–2007), Greek American physicist and soldier
- Helias Doundoulakis (1923–2016), Greek American civil engineer
