= The 11th Day: Crete 1941 =

2005 documentary film

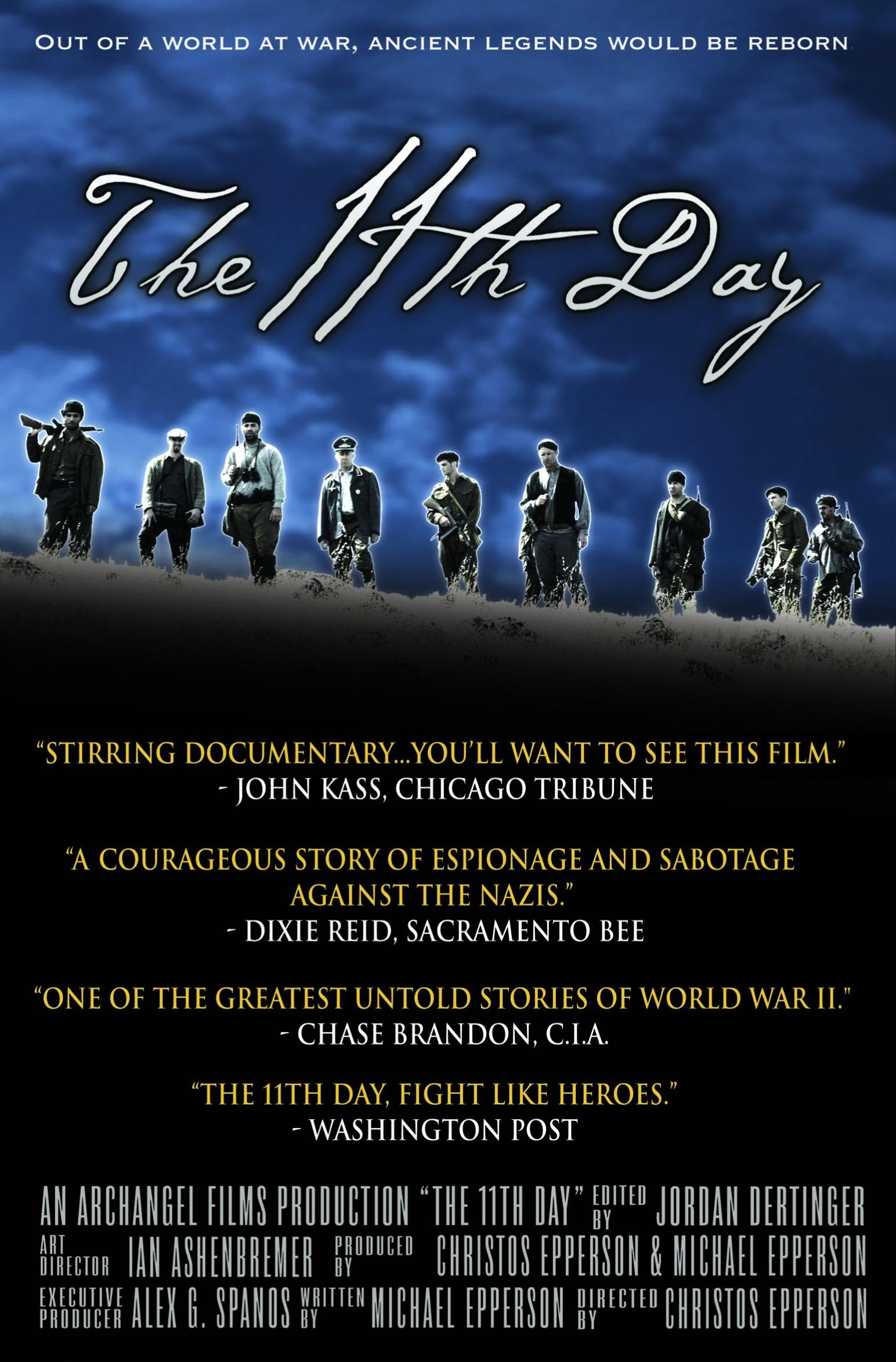
- Directed by: Christos Epperson
- Written by: Michael Epperson
- Produced by: Christos Epperson; Michael Epperson
- Cinematography: Ian Ashenbremer
- Edited by: Jordan Dertinger
- Release date: September 2005 (Chicago)
- Country: United States
- Languages: English and Greek

The 11th Day: Crete 1941 is a 2005 documentary film featuring eyewitness accounts from survivors of the Battle of Crete during World War II. The film was created by producer-director Christos Epperson and writer-producer Michael Epperson, and funded by Alex Spanos. Among the eyewitnesses interviewed are British SOE operative and famous travel writer Patrick Leigh Fermor, along with George Doundoulakis, and Cretan Resistance hero George Tzitzikas. The film also includes historical commentary and analysis by Chase Brandon of the CIA and Professor Andre Gerolymatos of Simon Fraser University.

== Plot ==
On May 20, 1941, thousands of elite German paratroopers, the Fallschirmjäger, assaulted the island of Crete. It was the beginning of one of the largest paratrooper assaults in modern history, ultimately involving 22,040 German soldiers. It was also the first time German troops faced a unified resistance from a civilian populace. The Battle of Crete would become the largest German airborne operation of World War II, known as "Operation Mercury," (German: Luftlandeschlacht um Kreta, also Unternehmen Merkur, Greek: Μάχη της Κρήτης).

The Germans had expected to control the island within a few days; after all, in less than seven weeks they had defeated France and occupied Paris for eight days before an armistice was signed. What the Germans had not anticipated was the unrelenting opposition from the men, women, and children of Crete, who would fight alongside British and Dominion forces, ultimately embroiling Nazi Germany in one of its most costly campaigns of the war. Collaborating with a handful of British Special Operations Executive commandos like Patrick Leigh Fermor, William Stanley Moss (both featured in the film) and John Pendlebury, the Cretan resistance would prove to become the most dauntingly potent civilian resistance movement Nazi Germany would encounter throughout the war. Although the Battle of Crete ended after ten days with the withdrawal of British forces from the island, history would record it as a Pyrrhic victory for the Germans, as the years-long resistance that began on the "11th Day" would belong to the Cretans.

== Historically significant operations documented in the film ==
With the help of a handful of British agents of the Special Operations Executive, as well as supply drops from the U.S. Office of Strategic Services, the Cretan civilian resistance engaged in many significant sabotage operations, among these the destruction of the Kastelli Airfield. George Doundoulakis, along with Kimon Zografakis and two English commandos, was able to destroy the airfield, which included German airplanes and hundreds of barrels of aviation fuel. Among the most historically significant of these operations was the abduction and rendition of the German commander of Crete, General Heinrich Kreipe. Masterminded and led by British Special Operations Executive officers Patrick Leigh Fermor and Billy Stanley Moss, it was undoubtedly the most ambitious, if not the only successful, kidnapping of a German general throughout the war. Both Leigh Fermor and Moss became legend after the war in the British book and film, Ill Met by Moonlight, for their abduction of German general Kreipe and their rendition of the general from Crete to Egypt. Notably, "The 11th Day: Crete 1941" includes rare, exclusive interview segments with Patrick Leigh Fermor himself, wherein he recounts this historic operation in great detail.

== Production ==
Pre-production for the project began in 2000, when producer-director Christos Epperson and his brother, philosopher Michael Epperson, the film's writer and co-producer, began to document the history of their great aunts and uncles—three brothers and their two sisters—who fought with the Cretan resistance in Chania. In 1944, their aunt Eleftheria Xirouhakis was captured, tortured, and executed, and her brothers Kyriako, Manoli, and Dimitri were sent to the Mauthausen concentration camp, and were later transferred to the Auschwitz concentration camp, then the Bergen-Belsen concentration camp and finally back to the Mauthausen camp where they remained until their liberation by the U.S. Army on May 5, 1945. Moved by the story, Los Angeles Chargers owner Alex Spanos provided major funding for the project, allowing it to expand to include the stories of numerous other Cretan resistance veterans, British soldiers, Special Operations Executive agents, as well as historical analysis by Andre Gerolymatos of Simon Fraser University and Chase Brandon of the U.S. Central Intelligence Agency. Principal photography began in late 2001 in Crete, with additional footage shot in Northern California.

== Release ==
The film premiered on September 28, 2005 in Chicago, beginning a tour of theaters throughout the United States and Canada. In November 2006, the film was released on DVD with Greek and English-language tracks. A photo gallery of over 500 images is also included. The film is available in libraries as well as through commercial online retailers. On the official film website, the producers have made available their collection of research material. Included are over 2000+ photos, of which many are rare and unpublished. It is the perhaps one of the largest online archive of World War II photos and documents in the world.

== Sources ==
- Tomadakis, Nikolaos V. (1957). "†Αγαθάγγελος Ξηρουχάκης (1872-1958). Βιογραφικόν και βιβλιογραφικόν σημείωμα". Kritika Chronika (in Greek). 11.
- Reid, D. “For Sacramento brothers, making ‘The 11th Day: Crete 1941’ was personal.” The Sacramento Bee, 9 December 2005, p.27-28.
- Kass, J. “Movie gives life to little told tale of WWII heroism.” The Chicago Tribune, 25 September 2005.
- Knight, C. “Heroes fight like Greeks” National Post, Toronto Edition, 29 October 2005
- Beevor, A: Crete: The Battle and the Resistance, Second Edition, Westview Press, 1994
