= George Doundoulakis =

United States Army soldier and physicist (1921–2007)

George James Doundoulakis
- Born: George James Doundoulakis; October 18, 1921; Detroit, Michigan, U.S.
- Died: March 17, 2007 (aged 85); North Bellmore, New York, U.S.
- Resting place: Greenfield Cemetery, Uniondale, New York
- Education: Brooklyn Polytechnic
- Known for: Arecibo radio telescope suspension system
- Spouse: Chrysanthe Markomihelakis
- Scientific career
- Fields: Physics, electronics, radar
- Workplaces: Brooklyn Polytechnic, RCA Institutes, General Bronze Corporation
- Doctoral advisor: Paul Peter Ewald
- Military career
- Allegiance: United States
- Branch: United States Army
- Service years: 1943–1946
- Rank: First Sergeant
- Nicknames: American George, George Papadakis, Stork
- Unit: Office of Strategic Services
- Conflicts: Second World War Mediterranean Theater of Operations
- Awards: King's Medal Legion of Merit

George James Doundoulakis (October 18, 1921 – March 17, 2007) was a Greek American physicist and soldier who worked under British Intelligence during World War II with SOE agent Patrick Leigh Fermor, and then served with the OSS in Thessaly, Greece.

He is known for his twenty-six US patents in the fields of radar, electronics, and narrowband television. Doundoulakis is best remembered for the idea of suspending the antenna feed of the Arecibo radio telescope by cables and towers, eventually patented by his brother Helias Doundoulakis.

A decorated veteran of World War II, Doundoulakis formed an underground resistance organization in Crete under the Special Operations Executive. He escaped to Egypt and joined the U.S. Army and Office of Strategic Services – the OSS. He was sent back to Greece, where he outfitted and unified a leftist rebel army, and was awarded the Legion of Merit from the United States Army and the King's Medal for Courage in the Cause of Freedom from Great Britain.

== Early life ==
George Doundoulakis was born in Detroit, Michigan to Greek-immigrant parents, Demetrios and Evanthia (née Psaroudakis) Doundoulakis. When he was four years old, his family immigrated to Crete, Greece to look after their blind grandmother in the village of Archanes. Nearby was the Minoan excavations at Knossos, where British archaeologist – later, SOE agent – John Pendlebury had been the curator.

By 1941, Greece had fallen to the Axis powers except Crete. On May 20, 1941, German paratroopers invaded the island, known as the Battle of Crete.

== World War II ==
=== Battle of Crete and the Cretan resistance ===
During the Battle of Crete, Doundoulakis assisted the Greek and British army headquarters in Archanes, translating communiqués from other military posts. After the British had been defeated, those soldiers who could not be evacuated either surrendered or went into hiding.

=== Special Operations Executive ===
Montague Woodhouse was appointed SOE chief on Crete, replacing John Pendlebury, who had been executed by the Germans during the battle. Woodhouse approached Doundoulakis after spotting his savoir-faire as the Greek interpreter in Archanes. He requested that Doundoulakis support the SOE in hiding and evacuating British soldiers who had been left behind on Crete, with full knowledge that his efforts were punishable by death. Undaunted, Doundoulakis formed an underground organization under the command of the SOE's "Monty" Woodhouse. This would become one of the first Cretan resistance groups. Along with his brother Helias Doundoulakis and friends, they began scouring the island for recruits. Gathering momentum, Doundoulakis rounded up ex-military personnel and civilians from Heraklion and Lasithi. After Woodhouse left Crete, the SOE replaced him with "Tom" Dunbabin. Risky sabotages under his watch were performed, such as the destruction of the Kastelli Airfield. Along with friend Kimon Zografakis and two British commandos, Doundoulakis was able to set the airfield on fire after they placed explosives on seven German airplanes and hundreds of barrels of aviation fuel. Informants also uncovered German naval intelligence through a paramour of a German officer. After being relayed to Dunbabin, it resulted in the destruction of a German convoy destined to resupply Field Marshal Erwin Rommel and his Afrika Korps in September 1942. After the war, Doundoulakis was awarded the King's Medal for Courage in the Cause of Freedom from Great Britain for his services. Thomas Dunbabin was awarded the Distinguished Service Order by the British military.

Dunbabin finally left, and the SOE followed him up with the legendary Patrick Leigh Fermor, known to the Cretans as "Mihalis". George's intelligence circle grew exponentially. George and Leigh Fermor, along with guerrilla leader Manolis Bandouvas, would take refuge within the mountainous SOE hideouts of Mount Ida.

After serving under the SOE for two years, Doundoulakis' ever-widening organization became apparent. He was blackmailed by a local Cretan who demanded one million drachmas as hush money. Otherwise, his organization and the SOE's Leigh Fermor would be let known to the Germans. Refusing the blackmail, Doundoulakis sent high school friends Sifis Migadis and John Androulakis to dispose of the traitor. However, they were too late in stopping the betrayal to the Gestapo. Leigh Fermor urged Doundoulakis to take flight at once to Crete's southern shore, and await evacuation by the SOE. They escaped through Mount Ida and the mountain ranges of Rethymno with others in his organization. After hiding in caves for a month, they were rescued by a British torpedo boat south of Tymbaki. Along with thirteen other resistance members, they headed to Mersa Matruh, Egypt. As they were about to board, Doundoulakis reunited with Leigh Fermor and partisan leader Petrakogiorgis. Petrakogiorgis had returned to Crete on the same vessel carrying the Doundoulakis brothers to Egypt on June 7, 1943. They would not see Leigh Fermor for another forty years. Leigh Fermor and "Billy" Stanley Moss became renowned after the war in the British book and film, Ill Met by Moonlight, for their abduction of German General Kreipe from Crete. After reaching Mersa Matruh, Doundoulakis and his brother, as well as his close circle of friends, were transported to an SOE villa in Heliopolis. They were destined for SOE saboteur training upon the entreaty of Leigh Fermor, while the other escapees went off to the exiled Greek Army in the Middle East. Before leaving Crete, Doundoulakis instructed Mikis Akoumianakis to assume command of the organization that he had begun. Mikis Akoumianakis "took over the Allied intelligence network in Heraklion and became the key British agent in the region for the last three years of the war." Later, along with Leigh Fermor and "Billy" Moss, he would become a key player in the kidnap of General Kreipe from Crete.

=== Office of Strategic Services (OSS) ===
Two months of training at the lavish SOE villa in Heliopolis, Cairo, came to an abrupt end when Doundoulakis learned of the Office of Strategic Services, the OSS. Doundoulakis contacted the fledgling American spy service that would become a key player in the Doundoulakis brothers' future. With help from Leigh Fermor, he informed the SOE commander of his intentions to join the American Army. Much to the SOE's dismay, George and Helias ultimately departed as comrades-in-arms and with hopes of defeating their common enemy.

The OSS dispatched Captain James Kellis to enlist the Doundoulakis brothers into the US Army on September 16, 1943, and were assigned to the OSS. Their Commanding Officer was Major John Vassos, RCA's eminent industrial designer. Agents were trained inside a secluded palace of King Farouk's situated along Cairo's Nile River, known as Ras el Kanayas. Doundoulakis was trained in the Morale Operations (MO) and Special Operations (SO) branches.

Special Operations was modeled after the SOE, which included parachute, sabotage, defensive, weapons, and leadership training to support guerrilla or partisan resistance. Morale Operations training included psychological warfare and propaganda. After his training, Doundoulakis was sent to the port city of Volos, Greece in Thessaly. His mission, known as "Horsebreeders," was to coordinate some 7,000 Greek leftist rebels into a unified fighting force. Doundoulakis provided the necessary logistic sustainment that included weapons, a printing press, clothing, and materials for his secret army through OSS bases in Turkey. He had printed and distributed leaflets intended for German soldiers and Greek collaborators, to subvert their confidence while encouraging the Greek population to resist. They were able to inflict enough damage to Volos' railroad transportation hub and its maritime shipping, that it contributed to the demise of the German supply line near Athens. The Germans were unable to remove Doundoulakis and the leftist rebels hidden in the impassable Pelion Mountains. Unrelenting attacks upon German communications and railway links led to an overwhelming success. Doundoulakis was promoted to first sergeant and awarded the Legion of Merit in OSS-Cairo.

His brother, Helias Doundoulakis, was trained at Cairo's Camp X-type 'Spy School' where he was sent on a mission to Salonica, Greece. There, Helias set up a fake business from a bombed-out factory once owned by Greek Jews who had fled from Nazi persecution. He remained embedded in Salonica from April to December 1944, sending encrypted radio messages to OSS-Cairo on German troop movements.

== Post-war ==
Doundoulakis spent the remainder of his enlistment at the Congressional Country Club in Bethesda, MD, which had been commandeered by "Wild Bill" Donovan's OSS as a training ground known by its codename "Area F". Following his discharge, Doundoulakis settled in Brooklyn, NY.

=== Education ===
After settling in Brooklyn, New York, Doundoulakis received a bachelor's degree in physics from Brooklyn Polytechnic in 1953 under the GI Bill. He went on to earn his Master of Science in physics at Brooklyn Polytechnic under renowned physicist and X-ray crystallographer Paul Peter Ewald in 1955.

=== RCA Institutes ===
After receiving his master's of physics from Brooklyn Polytechnic, Doundoulakis found his metier in electronics, radio physics and the advancing field of radar and television. Tutored by Ira Kamen, one of the preeminent electrical engineers in New York City at the RCA Institutes, Doundoulakis gained a solid foothold in the field. Subsequently, he taught electronics at the RCA Institutes. In 1956, Doundoulakis and Ira Kamen filed their first US patent.

=== General Bronze Corporation ===
Seeing the potential of this rising star in a rapidly developing field, Doundoulakis was hired by the General Bronze Corporation in Garden City, New York as head of Research and Development (R&D). At the time, General Bronze was dedicated to pioneering and taking the lead in the commercial market of antenna designs. Along with Stanley Gethin, he copyrighted antenna and radar-related projects for General Bronze.

=== Arecibo Radio Telescope ===
As the head of Research and Development for General Bronze, Doundoulakis was notified by Cornell University of their intent to build a radio telescope. Subsequently, he was invited to Cornell the day the project for the design and construction of the antenna at Arecibo, Puerto Rico was announced, by Professor William Gordon. Gordon, who led the project for Cornell, indicated at that time that the support for the antenna feed – or "eye" – was envisioned to be a 500-foot tower situated in the center of the 1000 ft. reflector.

Doundoulakis, foreseeing a simpler approach with a suspended antenna feed, leapt at the opportunity. Along with Zachary Sears – who directed Internal Design at Digital B & E Corporation of New York – he received the request for proposal (RFP) from Cornell University for the antenna design. He studied the idea of suspending the antenna feed with his brother, Helias Doundoulakis, a civil engineer who was then working for Emery Roth. Doundoulakis identified the problem that a tower or tripod would have presented around the center, which is the most critical portion of the reflector. Instead, Doundoulakis' proposal of a revolutionary design, by suspending the feed from cables connected to towers, was more practical. Rather than having a massive tower in the center of the reflector, his design would save millions in construction costs.

He presented his proposal to Cornell University for a suspension system of the feed. This suspension system would possess a doughnut or torus-type truss suspended by four cables from four towers, to provide along its edge a rail track intended for azimuthal positioning of the feed. A second truss in the form of an arch was to hang below and rotate on said rails through 360 degrees. The arch also provided rails onto which the unit supporting the feed would move to provide for the elevational positioning of the feed. A counter-weight would move symmetrically opposite to the feed position for overall stability. George informed his brother, Helias Doundoulakis, to design the cable suspension system which was finally adopted for the Arecibo Antenna. A patent was filed on September 11, 1961, by Helias Doundoulakis for "A radio telescope having a scanning feed supported by a cable suspension over a stationary reflector" who designed the suspension system according to George's specifications. Although the present configuration of the Arecibo Antenna is identical to the original drawings by George and Helias Doundoulakis (except with three towers, instead of the four towers drawn in Doundoulakis' patent), the United States Patent and Trademark Office finally granted Helias Doundoulakis a U.S. patent on September 13, 1966 – for designing the radio telescope's suspension system. Two other assignees on the patent were close friends William J. Casey, ex-director of the CIA under President Reagan, and attorney Constantine Michalos.

After the observatory was damaged by Hurricane Maria in 2017, it was also affected by earthquakes in 2019 and 2020. Two cable breaks, one in August 2020 and a second in November 2020, threatened the structural integrity of the support structure for the suspended platform and damaged the dish. Due to uncertainty over the remaining strength of the other cables supporting the suspended structure, and the risk of collapse due to further failures making repairs dangerous, the NSF announced on November 19, 2020, that it would decommission and dismantle the telescope. Before it could be decommissioned, several of the remaining support cables suffered a critical failure and the support structure, antenna, and dome assembly all fell into the dish at 7:55 a.m. local time on December 1, 2020, destroying the telescope.

=== Advancement Devices and William J. Casey ===
In the 1950s, Doundoulakis began his own company dedicated to pursuing his patent designs and applying them to the market. Advancement Devices was launched, through which William J. Casey first heard of the inventor. In WWII, Casey had been chief of the OSS' Secret Intelligence branch for Europe. He learned that Doundoulakis also served in the OSS, and had secured a contract from the "Army Signal Corps to produce a radar that could measure the trajectory of a mortar shell. But he lacked the capital to follow through on his bid." Following this lead, Casey ensured that all the necessary funding would accompany Doundoulakis' future projects. Under Advancement Devices, and with contributions from Casey, Doundoulakis developed a stream of patents for electronics, television, and internal ballistic engines.

One patent, the tri-rotor engine, became a matter of contention with the IRS in back taxes owed by Casey to the IRS. Nonetheless, the Doundoulakis/Casey business partnership would beget a life-long friendship from, "the inventor who he had long subsidized." Their bond was not only grounded in their prior service with the OSS but in an alliance that continued throughout Casey's Congressional hearings prior to his SEC (Securities and Exchange Commission) post. Doundoulakis was called to testify before the United States Congress on Casey's behalf. He eventually was sworn in and became head of the Securities and Exchange Commission under President Nixon. Afterward, under the presidency of Ronald Reagan, Casey was appointed the director of the Central Intelligence Agency.

== Personal life ==
Doundoulakis married Chrysanthe "Chris" (Markomihalakis) in Brooklyn, New York, where they settled after the war, resettling in North Bellmore, New York. They had two sons and one daughter, and three grandchildren.

During the 1980s, Leigh Fermor visited and stayed with Doundoulakis at his North Bellmore home, during one of the many celebrations for the Battle of Crete and the abduction of Gen. Kreipe, punctuating a friendship which had endured throughout both their lives.

== Death ==
George Doundoulakis died on March 17, 2007, and was buried with military honors in Greenfield Cemetery, Uniondale, New York.

== Awards ==
- 2015 – Both George and Helias Doundoulakis were recipients of the OSS Society's 2015 Distinguished Service Award at the annual Donovan Award Dinner honoring Ambassador Hugh Montgomery in Washington, DC.
- 2008 – OSS Society, May and November, Meritorious Service Award, by the Greek Government and OSS Society, Astoria, NY
- 1991 – PAA, Pancretan Association of America Distinguished Service Award, 50th Anniversary of Battle of Crete, Astoria, NY

== Notable works ==
- US Patent 3985110 Two-rotor engine
- US Patent 4281628 High efficiency tri-rotor ballistic engine
- US Patent 4392351 Multi-cylinder Stirling engine
- Scatter Propagation: Theory and Practice, (with Kamen, I.) publisher: Sams, Long Beach, CA, U.S.A, 1956.
- Shadows in the nights (Greek: Σκιές τις Νύχτες) 1999, written in Greek.

== Filmography ==
George Doundoulakis portrayed himself, along with Patrick Leigh Fermor in the 2005 movie, The 11th Day: Crete 1941 .
