= Cretan resistance =

Anti-fascist resistance movement in Greece during World War II

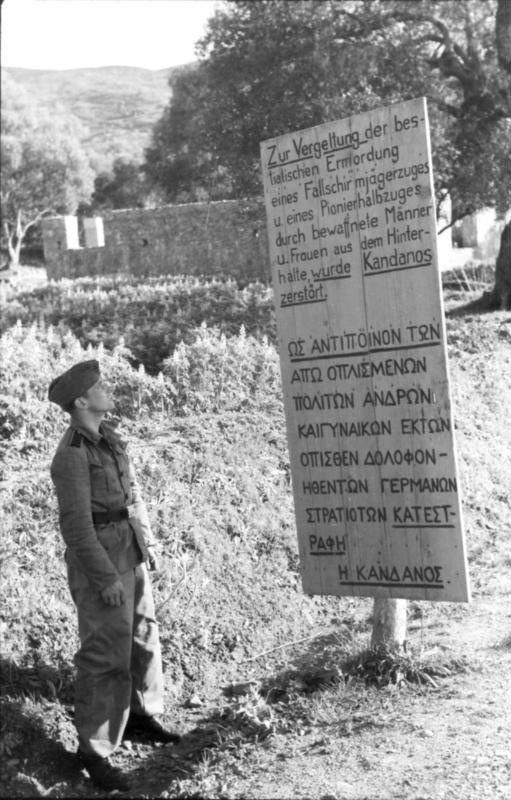
A German soldier in front of a sign erected after the razing of Kandanos. The sign reads: "Kandanos was destroyed in retaliation for the bestial ambush murder of a paratrooper platoon and a half-platoon of military engineers by armed men and women."

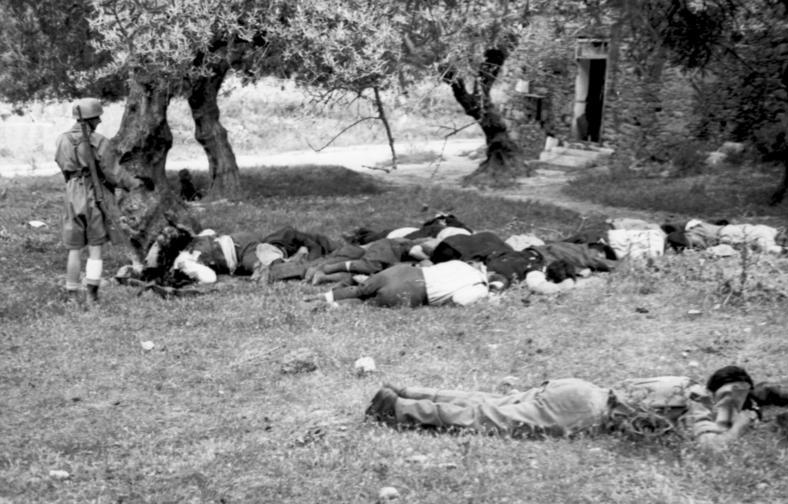
Massacre of civilians in Kondomari by German paratroopers in 1941.

The Cretan resistance (Greek: Κρητική Αντίσταση, Kritiki Antistasi) was a resistance movement against the occupying forces of Nazi Germany and Fascist Italy by the residents of the Greek island of Crete during World War II. Part of the larger Greek resistance, it lasted from 20 May 1941, when the German Wehrmacht invaded the island in the Battle of Crete, until the spring of 1945 when they surrendered to the British. For the first time during World War II, attacking German forces faced in Crete a substantial resistance from the local population. In the Battle of Crete, Cretan civilians picked off paratroopers or attacked them with knives, axes, scythes, or even bare hands. As a result, many casualties were inflicted upon the invading German paratroopers during the battle. For their resistance to the Germans, the Cretan people paid a heavy toll in the form of reprisals.

== Development ==
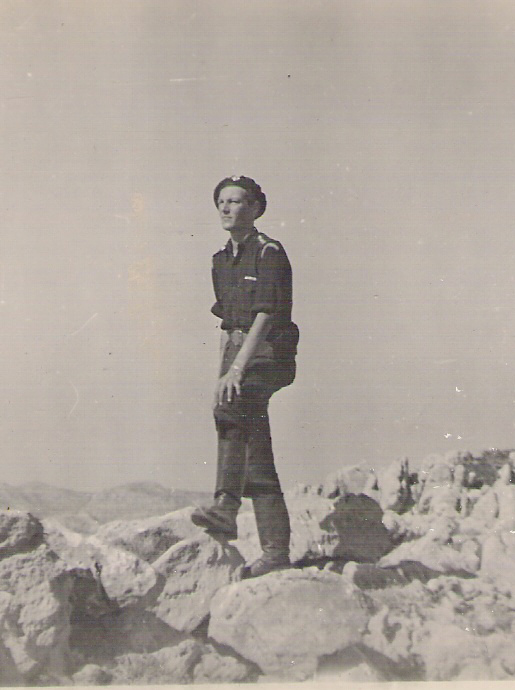
W. Stanley Moss in Crete.

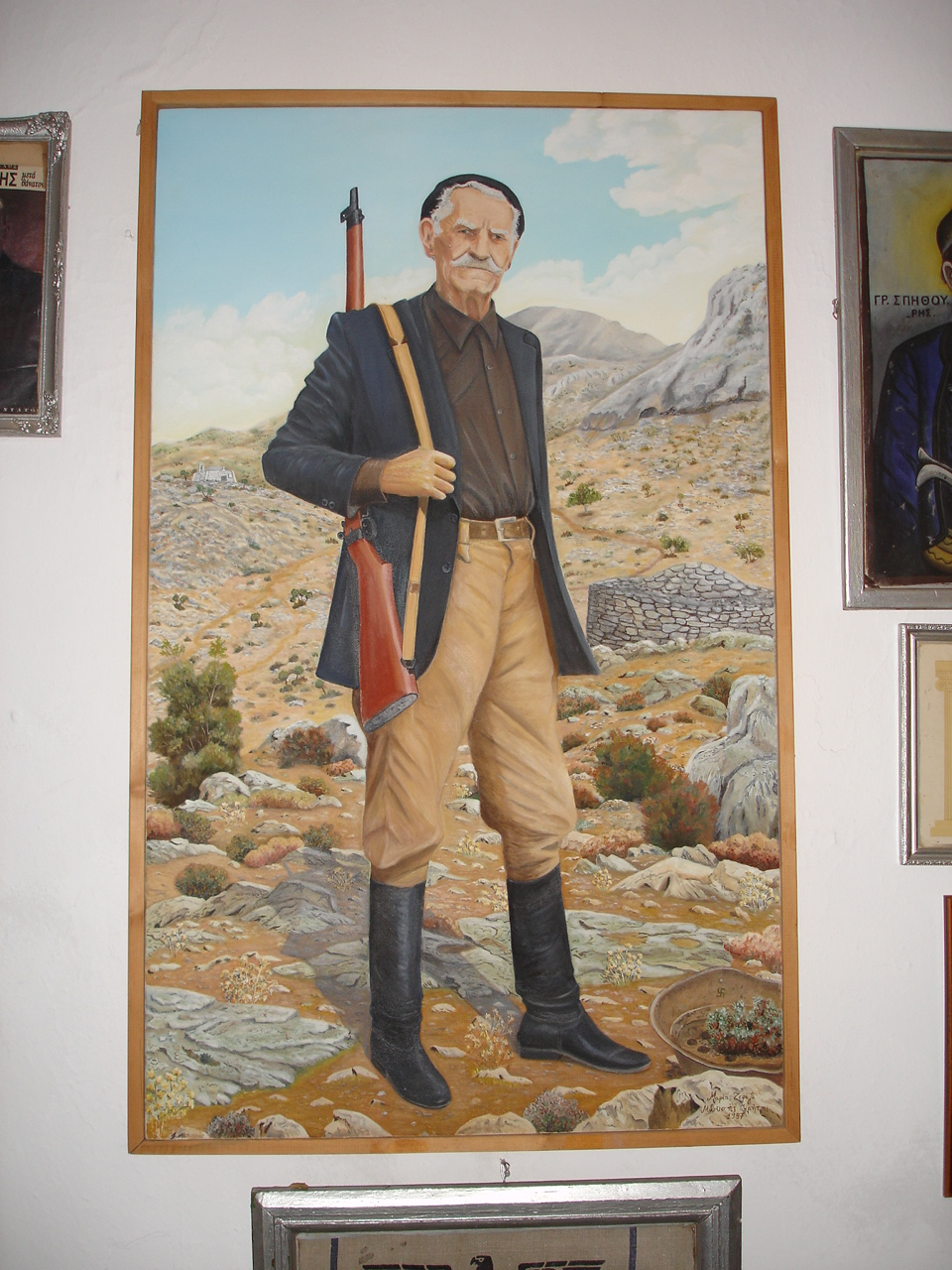
Manolis Spithouris- attacked an armoured car and survived the cannon shell strike to his belly during the Damasta sabotage.

The Cretan resistance movement was formed very soon after the Battle of Crete, with an initial planning meeting on 31 May 1941. It brought together a number of different groups and leaders and was initially termed the PMK (Πατριωτικó Μέτωπο Κρήτης – Patriotic Front of Crete), but later changed the name to EAM (Εθνικó Απελευθερωτικó Μέτωπο – National Liberation Front) like the principal communist-led resistance movement on the mainland. The primary objective of the movement, on the one hand, was to support the Cretan people under occupation by boosting morale, providing information, and distributing food at a time of great deprivation (due to confiscations by the Germans and Italians), and on the other hand to undertake certain operations against the Germans, including a number of sabotage operations.

Resistance in Crete involved figures such as Patrick Leigh Fermor, George Psychoundakis, Georgios Petrakis (Petrakogiorgis), Manolis Bandouvas, Antonis Grigorakis, Kostis Petrakis, John Lewis, Tom Dunbabin, Dudley Perkins, Sandy Rendel, John Houseman, Xan Fielding, Arthur Reade Dennis Ciclitira, Ralph Stockbridge and Bill Stanley Moss. Some of the movement's most famous moments included the abduction of General Heinrich Kreipe led by Leigh Fermor and Moss, the battle of Trahili, the sabotage of Damasta led by Moss and the airfield sabotages of Heraklion and Kastelli.

== History ==
Communication by boat with Egypt was established as a means of evacuating British and Dominion soldiers who were trapped on Crete and for bringing in supplies and men to liaise with Cretan resistance fighters. The local British intelligence officer and resistance co-ordinator John Pendlebury, who had been instrumental in mobilizing and preparing the local clan chiefs, prior to the invasion, was executed by the Germans during the Battle of Crete. After this, "Monty" Woodhouse, who had been appointed director of the SOE in Heraklion, made contact with civilians. He approached a young high school student named George Doundoulakis after observing his keen knowledge as a Greek interpreter in Archanes during the Battle of Crete. He asked him to support SOE in hiding and assisting British and Dominion soldiers who were unable to be evacuated. Doundoulakis formed an underground organisation under the auspices of the SOE, along with his brother, Helias Doundoulakis. Doundoulakis' organisation led to two major accomplishments: the destruction of the Kastelli Airfield, orchestrated by the SOE along with his friend Kimon Zografakis, and the destruction by the RAF of a German convoy destined to resupply Field Marshal Erwin Rommel in September 1942. After the war, George Doundoulakis was awarded the King's Medal for Courage in the Cause of Freedom from Great Britain for his services and assisting in the evacuation and safety of British and Dominion stragglers from Crete.

The non-communist wing was formed under the name National Organization of Crete (EOK) (with Andreas Papadakis as leader). Other resistance figures included Petrakogiorgis, whose SOE's code name was "Selfridge," and Manolis Bandouvas, codenamed "Bo-peep".

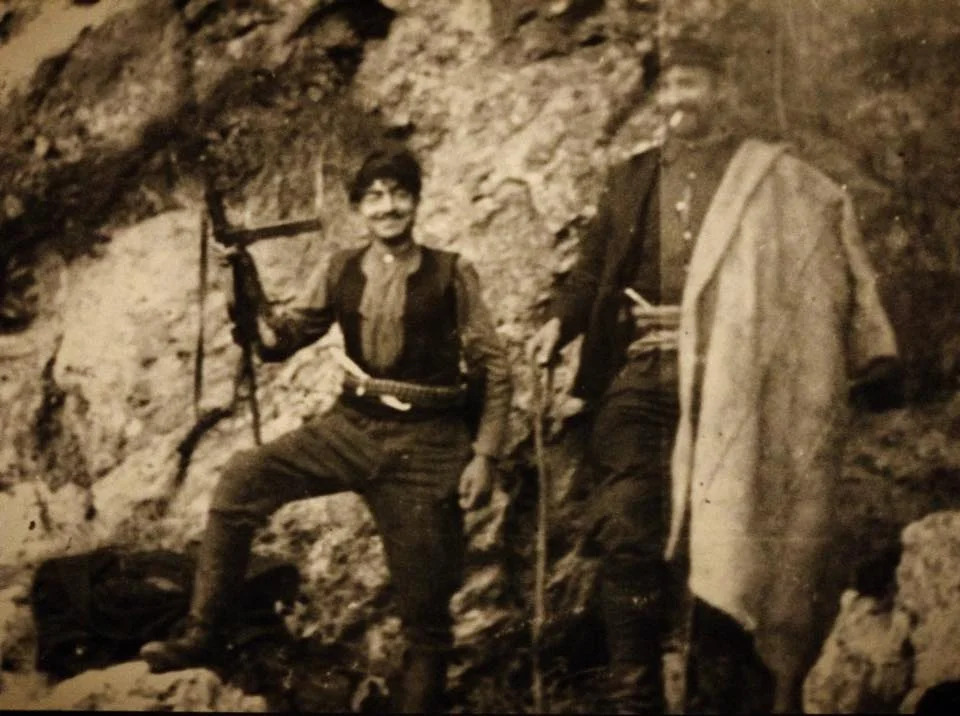
Arthur Reade and George Psychoundakis in the mountains of Crete in 1943

Both had their contacts in EOK, and SOE. When Dunbabin was replaced by Patrick Leigh Fermor, known to the Cretans as "Michalis", George Doundoulakis continued his intelligence gathering. George Doundoulakis, John Androulakis, and Leigh Fermor, along with guerrilla leader Manolis Bandouvas, would take refuge within the mountainous SOE hideouts of Mount Ida. Leigh Fermor became renowned after the war in the British book and film, Ill Met by Moonlight, for his abduction of German General Kreipe from Crete. Following Doundoulakis' exit from Crete to join the American Office of Strategic Services (OSS), he handed off leadership of the organisation he initiated to Mikis Akoumianakis, son of the caretaker at Knossos. Akoumianakis, known by his SOE code name "Minoan Mike," would later partake in the kidnapping of General Kreipe from Crete.

Leigh Fermor has said of the Cretan resistance that if it had not been for their resolve, the Battle of Crete would have ended sooner and the SOE's operations would have been greatly curtailed. It was solely due to their cohesiveness, not found anywhere else in Europe, that the SOE was able to move about the island essentially at will:

... When the Germans invaded Crete, their armies had just defeated the whole of Europe, except – thanks, perhaps, to the fluke of the Channel's existence – England. Logically the civilian population could have been expected to remain inactive while the professionals – the British Commonwealth and a small number of Greek troops – fought it out with the invaders. But to the great astonishment of both sides, all over the island bodies of Cretans – villagers, shepherds, old men, boys, monks and priests and even women, without any collusion between them or master plan or arms or guidance from the official combatants – rose up at once and threw themselves on the invaders with as little hesitation as if the German war machine were a Pasha's primitive expedition of Janissaries armed with long guns and scimitars. They had not a second doubt about what they should do ...

After detailing how he heard German occupiers systematically blowing up every house in four villages, a British observer offered this interpretation of German motivation:

... "The German reasons for this onslaught were that these villages were all hotbeds of bandits, the haunts of the British, hiding places of terrorists, refuges for commandos attacking aerodromes and supply dumps, the hiding places for unnumbered weapons, and the supply point for hundreds of bad men." ...

Cretans and the Cretan resistance worked closely with the British, firstly when they aided the British and Dominion forces in escaping from Crete, and secondly, when they worked together on acts of sabotage when Crete became a launching pad for German operations in Africa. This involved the British agents who either remained on Crete or escaped and re-entered Crete, such as Patrick Leigh Fermor, W. Stanley Moss, Tom Dunbabin, Sandy Rendel, and Stephen Verney, John Houseman, Xan Fielding, Dennis Ciclitira and Ralph Stockbridge. The New Zealander Dudley "Kiwi" Perkins, also known as "Kapetan Vasili" by locals became a legend for his courage, and after he was killed, the Cretans kept his grave covered with flowers.

The British formed a large number of isolated cells scattered throughout the mountains, with good communications, using runners, between them. One such runner was George Psychoundakis. Leigh Fermor's description of Psychoundakis epitomized Cretan resistance:

... Dick Barne's messenger, when he arrived, turned out to be George Psychoundakis, who had first been Xan Fielding's guide and runner for a long time, then mine when I had taken over Xan's area in the west for several months. This youthful, Kim-like figure was a great favourite of everyone's, for his humour, high spirits, pluck and imagination and above all the tireless zest with which he threw himself into the task. If anybody could put a girdle round Crete in forty minutes, he could. George, who was a shepherd boy from Asi Gonia, later wrote of the occupation and the resistance movement. I translated it from his manuscript and it was published, under the title The Cretan Runner ...

Attached to these cells were Greeks who otherwise tended to have no involvement with the main Cretan resistance movement, but worked very closely with the British agents, such as Leigh Fermor's runner George Psychoundakis, Kimonas Zografakis, George Doundoulakis, and John Androulakis. Zografakis, also known by his nom-de-guerre "Black Man," was a member of Force 133, the code name for SOE in Greece. Zografakis helped Leigh Fermor when he returned to Crete prior to the abduction of Kreipe in addition to the bombing of the Kastelli Airfield with George Doundoulakis.

Most cells had a radio for communicating with Egypt through which information could be passed and requests made for parachute drops of food, clothing, supplies, and weapons. German troops constantly tried to locate the sites of radio transmissions, thus necessitating regular changes of location.

The British agents, working with local resistance, were responsible for some famous operations including the abduction of General Heinrich Kreipe led by Leigh Fermor and Moss, the sabotage of Damasta led by Moss and the airfield sabotages of Heraklion and Kastelli.

Communication between EOK and EAM was poor, with open hostility breaking out between EOK and ELAS Greek: Ελληνικός Λαϊκός Απελευθερωτικός Στρατός (ΕΛΑΣ), the military wing of EAM, in January 1945 at the siege of Retimo. As Cretan fighters became better armed and more aggressive in 1944, the German troops pulled out of rural areas, having destroyed a number of villages in the Kedros area and executing many inhabitants, aiming to cow the Cretans. Grouping their forces around Canea, the Germans remained trapped until the end of the war, refusing to surrender to the Greek army, for fear of retaliation. They eventually surrendered to the British on 23 May 1945.

Nonetheless, Cretan bravery and courage instilled the island with a sense of triumph and willingness to overcome all odds. Leigh Fermor recounts an old villager of Anogeia, after hearing of threats of German reprisals:

... "They'll burn them down one day. And what then? My house was burnt down four times by the Turks; let them burn it down for a fifth! And they killed scores of my families. Yet, here I am! Fill up your glasses! ...

Leigh Fermor, while discussing the Cretans with General Kreipe during Kreipe's abduction, summarised the Cretans' attitude to the German occupation as :

Leigh Fermor: "The Cretans are all on our side, you know." ... General Kreipe: "Yes, I see they are. There, Major, you have me."

— Patrick Leigh Fermor, Abducting a General, p. 38.

== Documentary ==
In 2005, a documentary was released titled The 11th Day: Crete 1941, which describes personal details during the course of the Axis occupation of Crete and the role that the Cretan Resistance played. The film includes accounts by Patrick Leigh Fermor, George Doundoulakis, George Tzitzikas, and other eyewitnesses.
