= Helias Doundoulakis =

Greek American civil engineer (1923–2016)

Helias "Louis" Doundoulakis
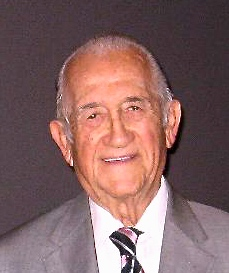
- Doundoulakis in 2012
- Born: Helias James Doundoulakis; 12 July 1923; Canton, Ohio, US
- Died: 29 February 2016 (aged 92); Freeport, N.Y.
- Occupations: Civil engineer, author, and soldier
- Spouse: Rita "Arete" Gianoplus
- Writing career
- Genre: Memoirs
- Notable works: I was Trained to be a Spy — Books I and II, My Unique Lifetime Association with Patrick Leigh Fermor, Trained to be an OSS Spy, The Arecibo Antenna
- Notable awards: Distinguished Service Award by the OSS Society, 2015

Helias Doundoulakis (July 12, 1923 – February 29, 2016) was a Greek American civil engineer who patented the suspension system for the at-the-time largest radio telescope in the world (the Arecibo Telescope). During World War II, he served in the United States Army and the Office of Strategic Services (OSS) as a spy.

== Early years ==
Helias Doundoulakis was born in Canton, Ohio to Greek immigrant parents, Demetrios and Evanthia (née Psaroudakis) Doundoulakis. When he was two years old, his family emigrated to Crete, Greece to care for his blind grandmother in Archanes. By 1941, Greece had fallen to the Axis powers save for Crete. On May 20, 1941, German paratroopers, invaded Crete while Helias was in high school.

== World War II ==
The Battle of Crete lasted ten days, during which Helias' brother George Doundoulakis worked as an interpreter for the joint Greek/British military headquarters. After the battle was lost, the Doundoulakis brothers joined the Cretan resistance. "Monty" Woodhouse, a Special Operations Executive (SOE) agent, approached George after witnessing his competence and leadership abilities. He asked that George help him evacuate British soldiers stranded on Crete. George formed an underground organization by recruiting friends, ex-military officers, and civilians from Heraklion and Lasithi. George's organization supplied key intelligence to the SOE by collaborating with Woodhouse, then with Thomas Dunbabin ("Tom"), and later, Paddy Fermor ("Mihalis"). Helias was assigned to the Heraklion Airfield, where he relayed to a nearby peanut vendor the number of Luftwaffe planes returning from Rommel's Afrika Korps in Egypt. George's informants uncovered intelligence which was relayed to Dunbabin. The information led to the sinking of a German convoy seeking to resupply Rommel in 1942. For their action, George and Dunbabin later were decorated by Great Britain, the former receiving the King's Medal and the latter the Distinguished Service Order.

George's organization was betrayed to the Gestapo by a local Cretan after two years with the SOE. Leigh Fermor urged Helias and George to depart immediately to the south shore of Crete through the Psiloritis Mountains and await exfiltration by the SOE. After hiding in caves for a month, the Doundoulakis brothers were rescued by a British torpedo boat. Along with thirteen others, they were bound for Mersa Matruh. As they were about to board, Helias and George reunited with Leigh Fermor and partisan leader Petrakogiorgis. Petrakogiorgis had returned to Crete on the same boat ferrying the Doundoulakis brothers to Egypt on June 7, 1943. The brothers would not see Leigh Fermor again for forty years. After the war, Leigh Fermor was immortalized in the British film Ill Met by Moonlight for his role in abducting General Kreipe in Crete.) After safely arriving in Mersa Matruh, Helias, George, John ("Yanni") Androulakis and three others were transported to an SOE villa in Heliopolis, an affluent suburb of Cairo. This chosen group was destined for saboteur training at the recommendation of Leigh Fermor. The other escapees were sent to the exiled Greek Army.

=== Office of Strategic Services (OSS) ===
The OSS was eventually informed of the Doundoulakis brothers' involvement with the SOE from Leigh Fermor. It dispatched OSS Captain James Kellis to recruit them as they were Americans. They enlisted in the United States Army on September 16, 1943. The Doundoulakis brothers then joined the OSS, the newly-formed American intelligence service. Their commanding officer was Major John Vassos, RCA's well-known industrial designer. Prospective agents were trained inside an elaborate palace rented from Egypt's ruling monarch, King Farouk. Helias was trained for six months in the arts of espionage in a facility known as the 'Spy School,' by the Secret Intelligence Branch. Advanced commando and parachute training was provided by the British at their SOE STS-102 training facility in Haifa, Palestine. Upon completion of his training in March 1944, Helias was dispatched on a mission to Salonica, Greece by Major Vassos. He set up a phony business in a factory once owned by Greek Jews. Helias remained embedded undercover in Salonica from April to December 1944, sending encrypted radio messages to OSS-Cairo on German activity. One message resulted in the destruction of a German troop train by a squadron of Allied B-25 bombers. His radio transmissions were pinpointed by German triangulation methods, but he escaped. Although constantly hunted by the Gestapo and the Greek police, he eluded capture. He was never suspected of being an American spy — outwitting both the Germans and Greeks. Had he fallen into enemy hands, he was determined to take his own life with a cyanide capsule. Helias was awarded the Good Conduct Medal at the OSS-Bari Station.

George Doundoulakis was trained in the Morale Operations and Special Operations branches. He was dispatched to Volos, Greece where he coordinated 7,000 Greek leftist rebels into a unified fighting force. He provided food, weapons, and materials for his irregular army through OSS bases in Turkey. Entrenched in the impassable Pelion Mountains of Thessaly, they destroyed Greece's eastern railway system and Volos' maritime link to Athens, effectively choking the German Army. George was promoted to first sergeant and awarded the Legion of Merit.

== Post-war ==
Helias Doundoulakis settled in Brooklyn, New York, upon completion of his duties in the U.S. Army. He received a bachelor's degree in civil engineering from the City College of New York, and a master's degree in structural engineering from Brooklyn Polytechnic under the GI Bill. Helias Doundoulakis met Rita (née Gianoplus), of Diplatanos and Agrinion, Greece, and were married in 1952. They had four sons and ten grandchildren.

=== Emery Roth ===
Doundoulakis worked on the design of the Pan Am Building (now the MetLife Building) in New York City while at Emery Roth and Sons. Emory Roth was known for designing the St. Moritz, now the Ritz Carlton Hotel.

=== Grumman Aerospace ===
Doundoulakis was employed at Grumman Aerospace Corporation for over thirty five years and group leader on many USAF and NASA projects. These included the Apollo Space Missions and the Lunar Excursion Module, the F-14 Tomcat fighter jet, and the Space Shuttle. His design of the oxygen tanks on the ill-fated Apollo 13 mission was instrumental in the return of the Apollo 13 crew, for which Doundoulakis was given a plaque by Captain James Lovell, Fred Haise, and Jack Swigert.

=== Arecibo Radio Telescope ===
Doundoulakis patented the unique suspension system for a radio telescope used in the design for the largest of its kind at the time, the Arecibo Observatory, Puerto Rico. He worked on this project with guidance from his brother, George Doundoulakis, head of research at the General Bronze Corporation, and who had initiated this novel idea for Arecibo's suspension system. Collaborating with long-time friends and business partners William J. Casey and Constantine Michalos — both assignees on the patent — Helias Doundoulakis was granted a U.S. patent on September 13, 1966 for designing the antenna's suspension system. During World War II, Casey had been appointed head of the OSS' Secret Intelligence branch for Europe. After the war, he held executive posts under President Nixon, including Securities and Exchange Commission chief. George Doundoulakis testified on Casey's behalf at his Senate confirmation hearings. Eventually, Casey was put in charge of the Central Intelligence Agency under President Reagan.

Hurricane Maria, though wreaking havoc on Puerto Rico's electrical grid, caused only minor damage to the Arecibo Observatory. The suspension system remained intact.

After the observatory was damaged by Hurricane Maria in 2017, it was also affected by earthquakes in 2019 and 2020. Two cable breaks, one in August 2020 and a second in November 2020, threatened the structural integrity of the support structure for the suspended platform and damaged the dish. Due to uncertainty over the remaining strength of the other cables supporting the suspended structure, and the risk of collapse due to further failures making repairs dangerous, the NSF announced on November 19, 2020 that it would decommission and dismantle the telescope. Before it could be decommissioned, several of the remaining support cables suffered a critical failure and the support structure, antenna, and dome assembly all fell into the dish at 7:55 a.m. local time on December 1, 2020, destroying the telescope.

== Death and funeral ==
Helias Doundoulakis died on February 29, 2016. He was buried with military honors next to his brother George in Greenfield Cemetery, Uniondale, New York.

== Awards ==
- 2015 – Helias and George Doundoulakis were jointly awarded the OSS Society’s Distinguished Service Award at the annual Donovan Award Dinner honoring Ambassador Hugh Montgomery in Washington, DC.
- 2008 – OSS Society, May and November, Meritorious Service Award, by the Greek Government and OSS Society, Astoria, NY
- 1991 – PAA, Pancretan Association of America Distinguished Service Award, 50th Anniversary of Battle of Crete, Astoria, NY

== Works ==
- The Arecibo Antenna — The Truth Revealed: A Primer for Designing the World's Greatest Radio Telescope, and a Memoir of William J. Casey, Constantine Michalos, and George Doundoulakis, 2022 (posthumously)
- My Unique Lifetime Association with Patrick Leigh Fermor, 2015
- Trained to be an OSS Spy, 2014
- I was Trained to be a Spy – Book II, 2012
- I was Trained to be a Spy, 2008
- Anamnisis (Greek: Αναμνήσεις), 2004

== Films ==
Doundoulakis portrayed himself in the 2014 History Canada 2-hr. documentary, "Camp X" and in the Smithsonian Channel 1-hr. documentary, "World War II Spy School."
