= Operation Albumen =

1942 British Commando raids in Crete

- Part of the Battle of the Mediterranean, in the Second World War
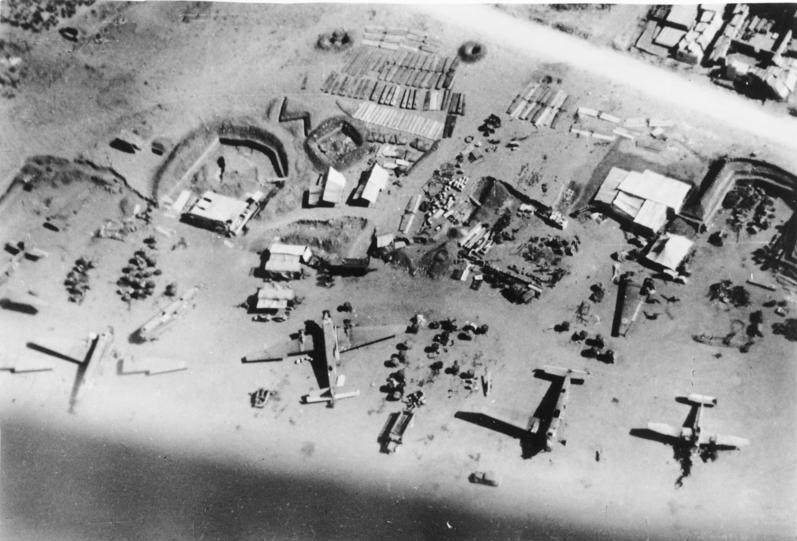
- Aircraft being repaired in Maleme, August 1941
- Location: Crete, Greece
- Objective: Commando raids on German airfields in the Axis-occupied Greek island of Crete
- Date: 7/8 June 1942; 4/5 July 1943
- Executed by: United Kingdom; Greece; Free France
- Outcome: Allied victory
- Casualties: 12 German soldiers Pierre Léostic †; 3 Free French captured 62+ citizens killed

Operation Albumen was the name of British Commando raids in June 1942 on German airfields in the Axis-occupied Greek island of Crete, to prevent them from being used in support of the Axis forces in the Western Desert Campaign in the Second World War. The operations were carried out with similar raids against Axis airfields at Benghazi, Derna and Barce in Libya and were among the first planned sabotage acts in occupied Europe.

== Background ==
During the Battle of Crete (20 May – 1 June 1941) the Axis powers had captured the island of Crete, before they had won the Balkans campaign. In the late spring of 1942, the airfields of Crete gained increased importance by becoming the main transit base for the Luftwaffe to fly supplies to the Axis forces in Egypt in their advance on the Nile Delta after the Battle of Gazala.

Luftwaffe aircraft based on Crete flew photo-reconnaissance, bombing and convoy sorties covering the south-eastern Mediterranean. To disrupt these operations, the British command in Cairo sent three groups from the Special Boat Squadron (SBS) and one from the Special Air Service (SAS) to Crete to sabotage the airfields of Heraklion, Kastelli, Tympaki and Maleme.

Aircraft types operating from Crete included the Junkers Ju 52 and Messerschmitt Me 323 transport aircraft, the Junkers Ju 88 and Junkers Ju 86 aircraft for bombing and photo-reconnaissance and the Messerschmitt Bf 109 fighter. Heraklion airfield was allocated to the SAS group and the SBS groups were assigned to the other three airfields. The SBS groups were met by Tom Dunbabin, the British liaison officer with the Cretan resistance, who provided them with local guides. The sabotage attacks were scheduled for the night of 7/8 June 1942.

== The Raids ==
=== Kastelli ===
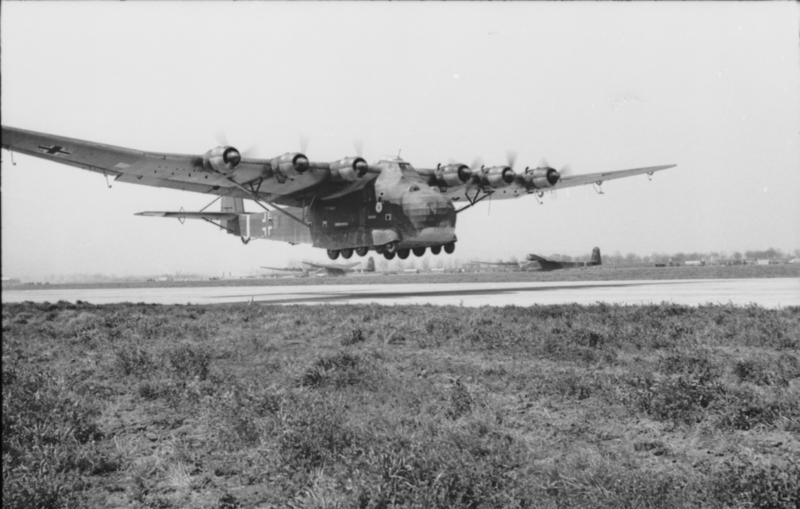
Me 323 Gigant in 1941.

The attackers on Kastelli consisted of Captain G. I. A. Duncan of the Black Watch, two NCOs of the SBS and the Greek gendarme Vassilis Dramoundanis. The operation went according to plan and on 7 June the saboteurs, assisted by the locals Giorgos Psarakis, Kimonas Zografakis (nicknamed Blackman) and Kostas Mavrantonakis, managed to destroy five aircraft, damage 29 and set fire to several vehicles and considerable quantities of supplies (including about 200 long tons (200 t) of aviation fuel) using delayed-action bombs.

The June 1942 operation is often referred to as the first raid on Kastelli, because of a similar operation that took place a year later. One of the objectives of the second operation was to mislead the Germans into believing that an Allied landing on Crete (rather than the Allied invasion of Sicily) was imminent. On the night of 4/5 July 1943, two commando groups under the Danish Major Anders Lassen and the Greek Kimonas Zografakis, simultaneously attacked the airfield of Kastelli from two directions. Despite the strong security, they succeeded in deceiving the garrison and destroyed most of the parked aircraft and fuel dumps.

=== Heraklion operation ===
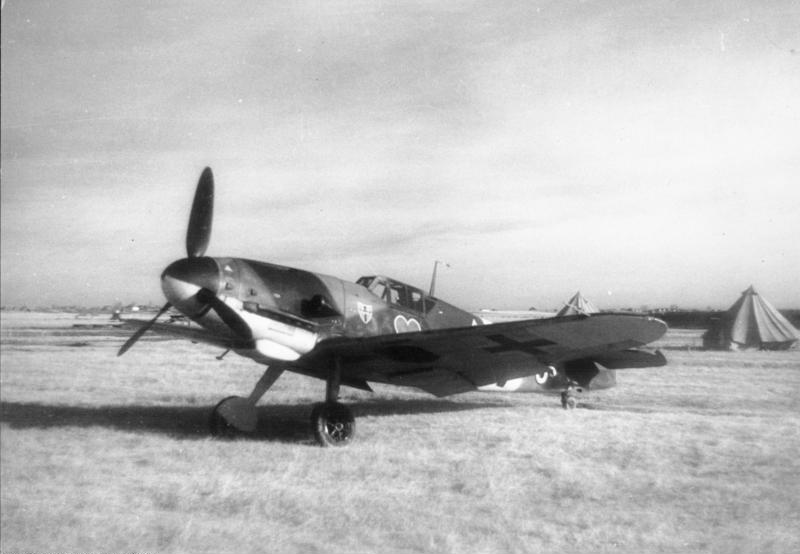
Bf 109 G-2 in 1942.

The Heraklion operation was commanded by George Jellicoe and included four members of the Free French Forces commanded by Georges Bergé (the other three being Jacques Mouhot, Pierre Léostic and Jack Sibard) and Lieutenant Kostis Petrakis of the Hellenic Army. The group was transferred to Crete on board the Greek Protefs-class submarine HS Triton (Y-5) and rowed ashore in three inflatable boats. They had intended to land at Karteros beach but came ashore in the Gulf of Malia on the dawn of 10 June and late. The men had to march overland to reach Heraklion airfield. They hid by day and marched by night, arriving during the night of 12/13 June. Due to increased traffic caused by night sorties, the team had to postpone their attack until the next evening. The group entered the airfield while it was being bombed by the Royal Air Force (RAF) and destroyed about twenty Ju 88s using Lewes bombs. All six saboteurs escaped from the airfield but their retreat was betrayed, resulting in 17-year-old Pierre Léostic being killed and the other three Frenchmen being arrested. Jellicoe and Petrakis escaped to Egypt.

=== Tympaki operation ===
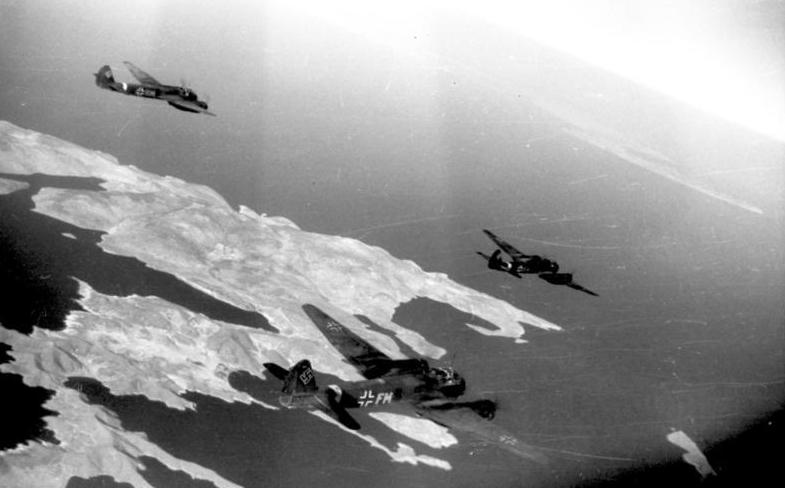
Ju 88 over Astypalaia in 1943.

The Tympaki team (led by David Sutherland of the Black Watch) discovered that due to air raids from Egypt, the airfield had been temporarily abandoned and the aircraft based there had been moved.

=== Maleme operation ===
The Maleme team was made up of Captains Michael Kealy and James Allott who landed on Crete aboard the Greek submarine Papanikolis. After a difficult march, they reached Maleme but they discovered that the airfield was strongly guarded and was recently equipped with electrified fences, making it impossible to get inside.

== Aftermath ==
The raiders destroyed 25 aircraft, damaged many more and killed 12 German soldiers. In reprisal for the sabotage in Heraklion, the occupation forces executed fifty inhabitants of the greater Heraklion area the next day. Prior to the attacks, on 3 June, the Germans had executed another twelve Heraklion citizens. The Avenue of the 62 Martyrs (Greek: Λεωφόρος 62 Μαρτύρων) in modern Heraklion is named in remembrance of the victims.

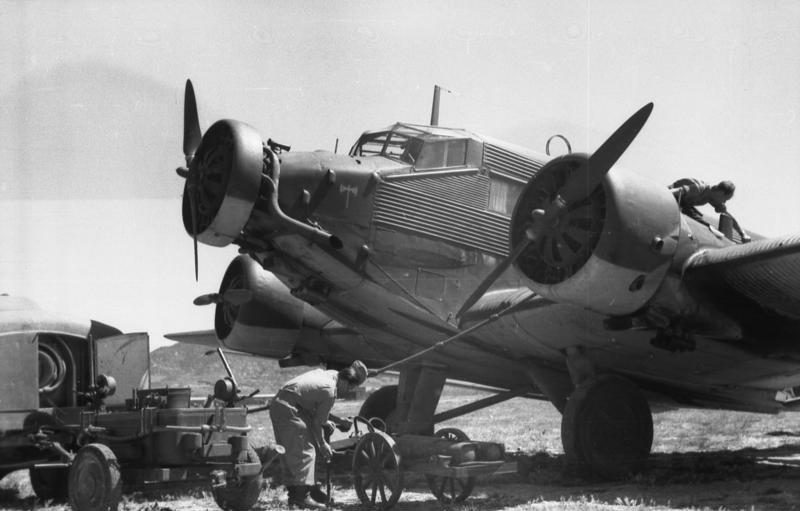
Junkers Ju 52 on Crete in 1943

On 23 June, Jellicoe, Petrakis and the participants of the Kastelli and Tympaki operations were evacuated to Mersa Matruh, Egypt on a caïque from Trypiti beach, near the village of Krotos in southern Crete. The raiders reached Mersa Matruh shortly before the Battle of Mersa Matruh, when it fell to the Axis army. Jellicoe was later awarded the Distinguished Service Order. Bergé, Mouhot and Sibard were captured after the Heraklion sabotage. After several days of interrogation under the threat of execution, the prisoners were transferred to Oflag X-C prison camp in Germany.

Bergé ended up in Oflag IV-C, Colditz castle in Saxony, where prisoners who had made many failed escape attempts were held. Bergé joined the SAS commander, David Stirling, who had been captured in the meantime. To honour the memory of Pierre Léostic, Kostis Petrakis christened his son after him. The failure to prevent the raids on the airfields was one of the reasons that led to the replacement of General Alexander Andrae by Bruno Bräuer as commander of Crete.

== See also ==
- Greek Resistance
- Cretan Resistance

== Bibliography ==
- Beevor, Antony (1992). Crete: The Battle and the Resistance. London: Penguin. ISBN 978-0-14-016787-0.
- Sibard, Jack L. (2006). Mission En Crete [Mission in Crete]. Héraklion: Société des Etudes Historiques Crétoises. ISBN 978-960-87170-5-3.
- Σανουδάκης/Spanoudakis, Αντώνης/Stamatis (1989). Ιππότες του ονείρου. Αφήγηση Κωστή Πετράκη [Knights of the dream. Narration by Kostis Petrakis]. Athēna: εκδόσεις Κνωσός. ISBN 978-960-207-009-3.
- Thompson, Leroy (1994). SAS: Great Britain's Elite Special Air Service. Osceola, WI: Zenith Press. ISBN 978-0-87938-940-6.
