= Giorgos Psarakis =

Greek politician

- Γιώργος Ψαράκης
- Born: 20 November 1919
- Died: 27 October 2007 (aged 87)

Giorgos Psarakis of Aristeides and Maria (20 November 1919, in Arkalochori, Heraklion – 27 October 2007) was a Greek politician and resistance fighter, the first member of parliament with PASOK (1974) from Crete. He served as governor of the Agricultural Insurance Board from 1981 to 1985.

== Biography ==
He had 8 siblings. The last surviving one, Giorgos's sister, Eleutheria Psaraki, died in July 2011.

He graduated the Practical Lyceum in Heraklion and then studied in the School of Commercial Studies in Athens. During World War II, he participated in the resistance, as he took part at the Battle of Crete, under Antonis Mpeteinakis and also in the attack against the airport at Kastelli in Operation Albumen, on 7 June 1942.

He served as president of the Arkalochori Community until his resignation in 1967 (in order to get into politics).

He was elected member of parliament in the 1974 election, the first election after the Metapolitefsi with the newly founded PASOK, getting 5,666 votes, and was the first PM with PASOK elected in Crete (in Heraklion).

In 1981 he was appointed by the PASOK government as governor of the Agricultural Insurance Board and remain in this position until 1985.

He died by cardiac arrest on 27 October 2007. The funeral was performed to days later at Arkalochori. With donations from the Psarakis family, a nursing home was built in Arkalochori, which was named after his last name. The donation was about 2 million euros.
