= Kimonas Zografakis =

Greek partisan in the Cretan resistance (1918–2004)

Kimonas or Kimon Zografakis (Greek: Κίμωνας ή Κίμων Ζωγραφάκης; 1918 – 23 November 2004), frequently referred to by his nom de guerre, Black Man, was a distinguished Greek partisan in the Cretan resistance from 1941 to 1944 against the Axis occupation forces.

== Early years ==
Kimonas Zografakis was born and raised in the village of Kastelli Pediados in Crete. His parents were Georgios (nicknamed Xirouhis, Greek: Ξηρούχης) and Ekaterini (née Katzagiannakis) Zografakis, who had two daughters and six sons. During the Greco-Italian War (1940–41), Kimon Zografakis served on the Albanian front.

== World War II ==
After the surrender of mainland Greece in April 1941, Zografakis returned to Crete. He participated in the Battle of Crete, fighting at Kokkini Chani, just east of Heraklion, Crete along the coastal highway. After the fall of Crete, he rejoined his family at Kastelli. In early 1942, the German occupation forces started the expansion of the nearby airfield. Zografakis' father, elected as the president of the local community, was ordered to organize his fellow villagers into forced labor camps at the behest of their German occupiers. However, he was unwilling to cooperate and he resigned from his post. He moved his family to the village of Kastamonitsa, a village just southeast of Kastelli. At Kastamonitsa, the entire family partook in the resistance, developing links with EOK.

=== Special Operations Executive ===
Young Kimon sought an opportunity to reach the Middle East, and thus, joined Great Britain's 8th Army in North Africa who were fighting the Axis countries. In early June 1942, he got his chance when he assisted a group of SBS commandos carrying out the sabotage of the Kastelli Airfield. After the operation, he followed the British commandos to the Middle East where he fought in battles at El Alamein and Mersa Matruh. He later joined Force 133 and trained as a parachutist and saboteur. After returning to Crete in July 1943, he took part in the second sabotage against the Kastelli Airfield under the orders of Anders Lassen.

Zografakis eventually escaped again to Egypt. In October 1943, after the battle of Kato Simi and the Viannos massacres, the Germans arrested many Greek officers. This was in reprisal for the death of German soldiers and for their complicity with the Cretan Resistance as well as assisting the SOE. Among them was Kimonas' brother, Giannis, who was a reserve second lieutenant injured at the Albanian front. Giannis Zografakis was court-martialed and sentenced to death with four other officers. They were executed in Agia Prison near Canea, Crete.

Later, under the SOE's command of Sandy 'Alexis' Rendel, Zografakis secretly returned to Crete. He took part in several clandestine operations mostly in eastern Crete. He was part of a group of partisans operating a Wireless radio hidden in the caves of the Dikti range. Along with SOE-trained John Androulakis, he partook in the Peza oil field sabotage. In February 1944, Zografakis met the legendary SOE agent Patrick Leigh Fermor, who parachuted into Crete at Katharo plateau, assisting him in the preparation of Gen. Heinrich Kreipe's abduction. In early April 1944, Zografakis sheltered Kreipe's abductors at his family house in Kastamonitsa for more than a fortnight. In August 1944, he participated in a successful attack against fuel dumps in Drasi, Mirabello.

== Post World War II years ==
Zografakis was awarded several medals from Greece and Great Britain for his service. However, in 1955, after disagreeing with the British government over its policies in Cyprus, he respectfully returned the medals given from Britain.
