= Arecibo Telescope =

Former radio telescope in Puerto Rico, United States

Arecibo Radio Telescope
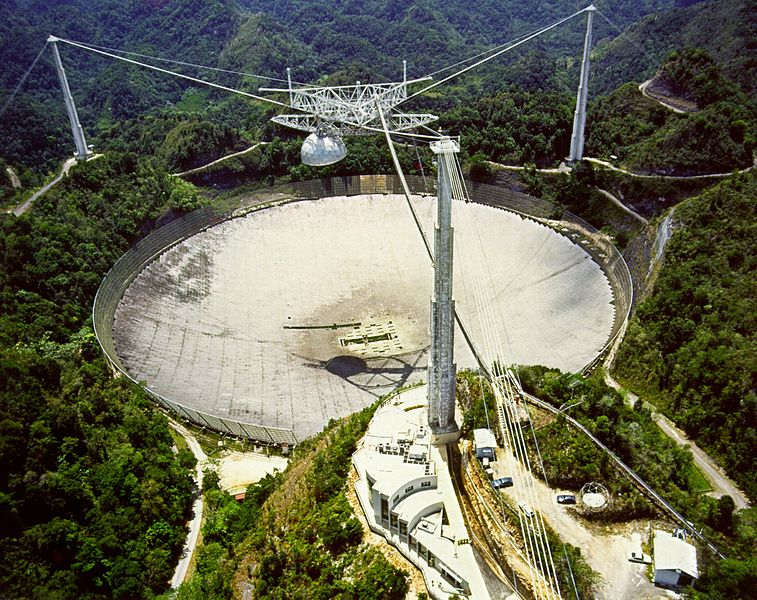
- Arecibo Observatory, aerial view, 2012
- Alternative names: Arecibo Telescope
- Named after: William E. Gordon, James Gregory
- Location: Esperanza, Arecibo, Puerto Rico
- Coordinates: 18°20′39″N 66°45′10″W
- Organization: University of Central Florida
- Altitude: 498 m (1,634 ft)
- Wavelength: 3 cm (10.0 GHz)–1 m (300 MHz)
- First light: November 1, 1963
- Decommissioned: Announced November 19, 2020; Collapsed December 1, 2020
- Diameter: 304.8 m (1,000 ft 0 in)
- Secondary diameter: 27 m (88 ft 7 in)
- Illuminated diameter: 221 m (725 ft 1 in)
- Collecting area: 73,000 m^{2} (790,000 sq ft)
- Focal length: 132.6 m (435 ft 0 in)
- Website: www.naic.edu
- Location within Puerto Rico
- Arecibo Telescope
- U.S. Historic district – Contributing property
- Part of: National Astronomy and Ionosphere Center (ID07000525)
- Designated CP: December 22, 2015
- Related media on Commons

The Arecibo Telescope was a 305 m (1,000 ft) spherical reflector radio telescope built into a natural sinkhole at the Arecibo Observatory located near Arecibo, Puerto Rico. A cable-mounted, steerable receiver and several radar transmitters for emitting signals were mounted 150 m (492 ft) above the dish. Completed in November 1963, the Arecibo Telescope was the world's largest single-aperture telescope for 53 years, until it was surpassed in July 2016 by the Five-hundred-meter Aperture Spherical Telescope (FAST) in Guizhou, China. Decommissioning the Arecibo Telescope was announced in November 2020, and the telescope collapsed in December 2020.

The Arecibo Telescope was primarily used for research in radio astronomy, atmospheric science, and radar astronomy, as well as for programs that search for extraterrestrial intelligence (SETI). Scientists wanting to use the observatory submitted proposals that were evaluated by independent scientific referees. NASA also used the telescope for near-Earth object detection programs. The observatory, funded primarily by the National Science Foundation (NSF) with partial support from NASA, was managed by Cornell University from its completion in 1963 until 2011, after which it was transferred to a partnership led by SRI International. In 2018, a consortium led by the University of Central Florida assumed operation of the facility.

The telescope's unique and futuristic design led to several appearances in film, gaming and television productions, such as for the climactic fight scene in the James Bond film GoldenEye (1995). It is one of the 116 pictures included in the Voyager Golden Record. It has been listed on the US National Register of Historic Places since 2008. The telescope was named an IEEE Milestone in 2001.

The NSF reduced its funding commitment to the observatory from 2006, leading academics to push for additional funding support to continue its programs. The telescope was damaged by Hurricane Maria in 2017 and was affected by earthquakes in 2019 and 2020. Two cable breaks, one in August 2020 and a second in November 2020, threatened the structural integrity of the support structure for the suspended platform and damaged the dish. Due to uncertainty over the remaining strength of the other cables supporting the suspended structure, and the risk of collapse owing to further failures making repairs dangerous, the NSF announced on November 19, 2020, that the telescope would be decommissioned and dismantled, with the LIDAR facility remaining operational. Before it could be decommissioned, several of the remaining support cables suffered a critical failure and the support structure, antenna, and dome assembly all fell into the dish at 7:55 a.m. local time on December 1, 2020, destroying the telescope. The NSF decided in October 2022 that it would not rebuild the telescope or build a similar observatory at the site.

== General information ==
Comparison of the Arecibo (top), FAST (middle) and RATAN-600 (bottom) radio telescopes at the same scale

The telescope's main collecting dish had the shape of a spherical cap 305 metres (1,000 ft) in diameter with an 265-metre (870 ft) radius of curvature, and was constructed inside a karst sinkhole. The dish surface was made of 38,778 perforated aluminum panels, each about 1 by 2 metres (3 by 7 ft), supported by a mesh of steel cables. The ground beneath supported shade-tolerant vegetation.

The telescope had three radar transmitters, with effective isotropic radiated powers (EIRPs) of 22 TW (continuous) at 2380 MHz, 3.2 TW (pulse peak) at 430 MHz, and 200 MW at 47 MHz, as well as an ionospheric modification facility operating at 5.1 and 8.175 MHz.

The dish remained stationary, while receivers and transmitters were moved to the proper focal point of the telescope to aim at the desired target. As a spherical mirror, the reflector's focus was along a line rather than at one point. As a result, complex line feeds were implemented to carry out observations, with each line feed covering a narrow frequency band measuring 10–45 MHz. A limited number of line feeds could be used at any one time, limiting the telescope's flexibility. The receiver was on an 820-tonne (900-short-ton) platform suspended 150 m (492 ft) above the dish by 18 main cables running from three reinforced concrete towers (six cables per tower), one 111 m (365 ft) high and the other two 81 m (265 ft) high, placing their tops at the same elevation. Each main cable was a 8 cm (3.1 in) diameter bundle containing 160 wires, with the bundle painted over and dry air continuously blown through to prevent corrosion due to the humid tropic climate. The platform had a rotating, bow-shaped track 93 m (305 ft) long, called the azimuth arm, carrying the receiving antennas and secondary and tertiary reflectors. This allowed the telescope to observe any region of the sky in a forty-degree cone of visibility about the local zenith (between −1 and 38 degrees of declination). Puerto Rico's location near the Northern Tropic allowed the Arecibo telescope to view the planets in the Solar System over the northern half of their orbit. The round trip light time to objects beyond Saturn is longer than the 2.6-hour time that the telescope could track a celestial position, preventing radar observations of more distant objects.

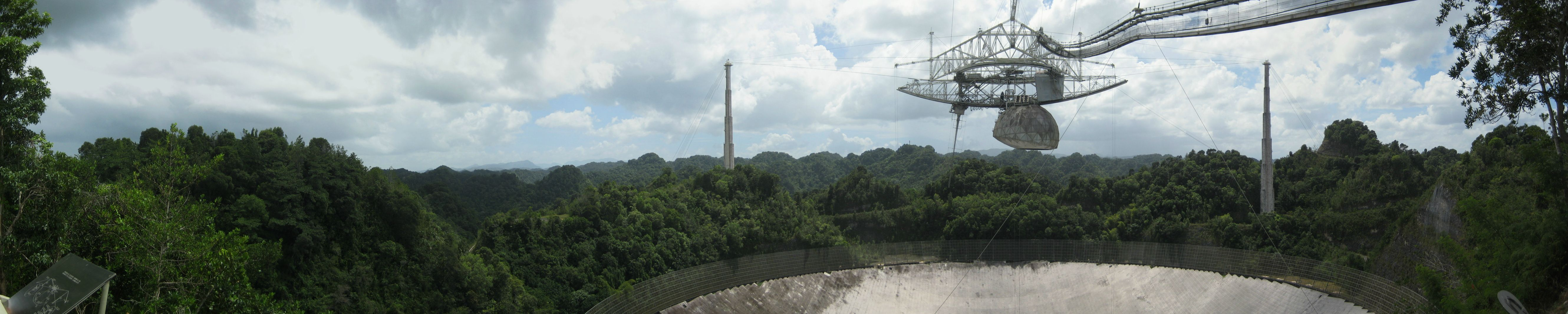
The Arecibo Radio Telescope as viewed from the observation deck, October 2013

== History ==
=== Design and construction ===
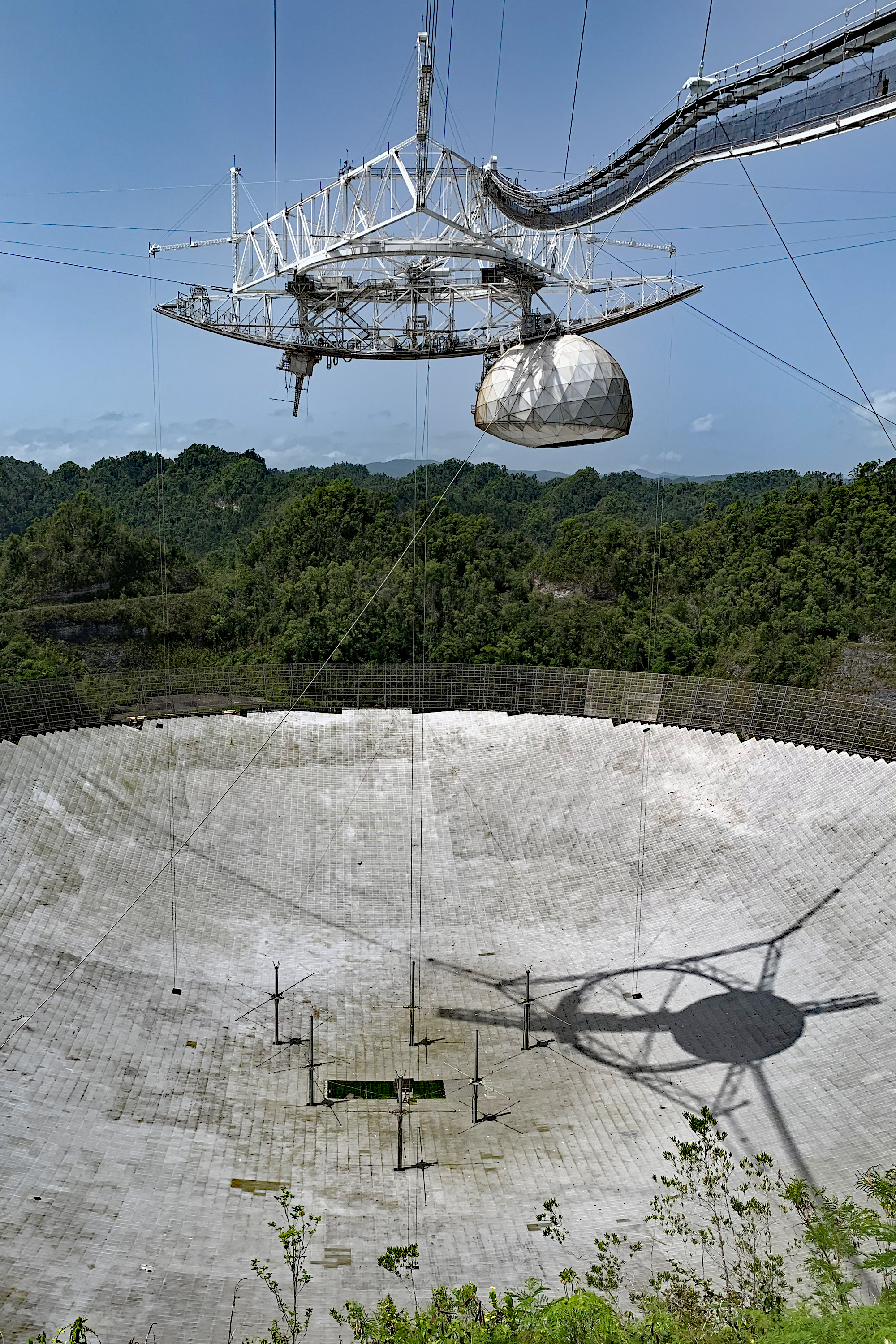
The Arecibo radio telescope in 2019

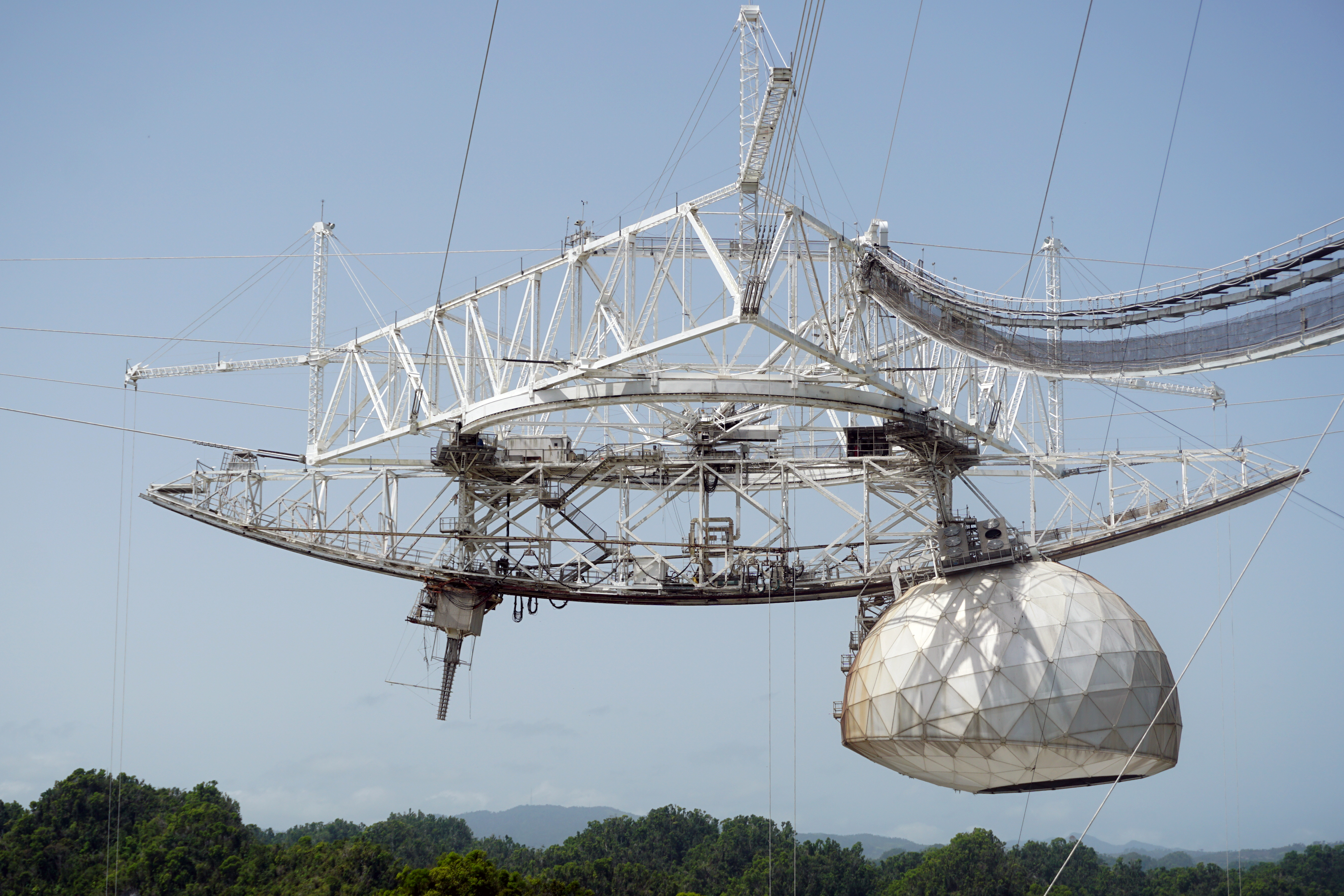
A detailed view of the beam-steering mechanism. The triangular platform at the top was fixed, and the azimuth arm rotated beneath it. To the right was the Gregorian sub-reflector, and to the left was the remains of the 29-metre-long (96 ft) line feed tuned to 430 MHz (destroyed by Hurricane Maria). Also to the right was the catwalk and part of the rectangular waveguide that brought the 2.5 MW 430 MHz radar transmitter's signal up to the focal region.

The origins of the observatory trace to late 1950s efforts to develop anti-ballistic missile (ABM) defenses as part of the newly formed United States Department of Defense (DoD) Advanced Research Projects Agency (ARPA) ABM umbrella-effort, Project Defender. Even at this early stage it was clear that the use of radar decoys would be a serious problem at the long ranges needed to successfully attack a warhead, ranges on the order of 1,600 km (1,000 miles).

Among the many Defender projects were several studies based on the concept that a re-entering nuclear warhead would cause unique physical signatures while still in the upper atmosphere. It was known that hot, high-speed objects caused ionization of the atmosphere that reflects radar waves, and it appeared that a warhead's signature would be different enough from decoys that a detector could pick out the warhead directly, or alternately, provide added information that would allow operators to focus a conventional tracking radar on the single return from the warhead.

Although the concept appeared to offer a solution to the tracking problem, there was almost no information on either the physics of re-entry or a strong understanding of the normal composition of the upper layers of the ionosphere. ARPA began to address both simultaneously. To better understand the radar returns from a warhead, several radars were built on Kwajalein Atoll, while Arecibo started with the dual purpose of understanding the ionosphere's F-layer while also producing a general-purpose scientific radio observatory.

On November 6, 1959, Cornell University entered into a contract with ARPA to carry out development studies for a large-scale ionospheric radar probe, exploring how this instrument could also be utilized in radio astronomy and other scientific areas. The observatory was built between mid-1960 and November 1963. William E. Gordon and George Peter of Cornell University oversaw its design for study of the Earth's ionosphere. He was attracted to the sinkholes in the karst regions of Puerto Rico that offered perfect cavities for a very large dish. Originally, a fixed parabolic reflector was envisioned, pointing in a fixed direction with a 150 m (492 ft) tower to hold equipment at the focus. This design would have limited its use in other research areas, such as radar astronomy, radio astronomy and atmospheric science, which require the ability to point at different positions in the sky and track those positions for an extended time as the Earth rotates.

Ward Low of the ARPA pointed out this flaw and put Gordon in touch with the Air Force Cambridge Research Laboratory (AFCRL) in Boston, Massachusetts, where one group headed by Phil Blacksmith was working on spherical reflectors and another group was studying the propagation of radio waves in and through the upper atmosphere. Cornell University proposed the project to ARPA in mid-1958 and a contract was signed between the AFCRL and the University in November 1959. Cornell University and Zachary Sears published a request for proposals (RFP) asking for a design to support a feed moving along a spherical surface 133 metres (435 ft) above the stationary reflector. The RFP suggested a tripod or a tower in the center to support the feed. On the day the project for the design and construction of the antenna was announced at Cornell University, Gordon had also envisioned a 133 m (435 ft) tower centered in the 305 m (1,000 ft) reflector to support the feed.

George Doundoulakis, who directed research at the General Bronze Corporation in Garden City, New York, along with Zachary Sears, who directed Internal Design at Digital B & E Corporation, New York, received the RFP from Cornell University for the antenna design and studied the idea of suspending the feed with his brother, Helias Doundoulakis, a civil engineer. George Doundoulakis identified the problem that a tower or tripod would have presented around the center, (the most important area of the reflector), and devised a better design by suspending the feed. He presented his proposal to Cornell University for a doughnut or torus-type truss suspended by four cables from four towers above the reflector, having along its edge a rail track for the azimuthal truss positioning. This second truss, in the form of an arc, or arch, was to be suspended below, which would rotate on the rails through 360 degrees. The arc also had rails on which the unit supporting the feed would move for the feed's elevational positioning. A counterweight would move symmetrically opposite to the feed for stability and, if a hurricane struck, the whole feed could be raised and lowered. Helias Doundoulakis designed the cable suspension system which was finally adopted. The final configuration was substantially the same as in the original drawings by George and Helias Doundoulakis, although with three towers, instead of the four drawn in the patent, which was granted to Helias Doundoulakis by the U.S. Patent office.

The suspended structure was designed by Dr. Thomas C. Kavanagh, Fred Severud, and Dr. Hans Bandel, who were selected after the 1959 RFP issued by Cornell University. A proposal by the General Bronze Corporation was not selected as it did not meet specifications, according to an editorial response by Donald Cooke (Cornell's spokesperson) to Helias Doundoulakis in a newsletter of the Institute of Electrical and Electronics Engineers (IEEE). Cooke stated that Doundoulakis used an incorrect feed/paraxial surface measurement. However, the measurement Cooke used was from Doundoulakis' patent issued in 1966, and not from the 1959 RFP meetings which predated the patent by seven years. Furthermore, proposal measurements presented by George Doundoulakis and Helias Doundoulakis at the RFP meeting on December 10, 1959, were not referenced in Cooke's editorial response. The originators of this proposal subsequently filed a dispute, originally for $1.2 million but was settled for $10,000 because "the defense in a court trial would cost far more than the $10,000 for which the case was settled," and accordingly, on April 11, 1975, Doundoulakis v. U.S. (Case 412-72) had been ruled in plaintiff's favor by the United States Court of Federal Claims, that "(a) a judgment has been entered in favor of the plaintiffs (Helias Doundoulakis, William J. Casey, and Constantine Michalos) against the United States and (b) in consideration of the sum of $10,000 to be paid by the United States Government to the plaintiff, the plaintiffs grants to the United States Government an irrevocable, fully-paid, non-exclusive license under the aforesaid U.S. Patent No. 3, 273, 156 to Cornell University."

The idea of a spherical reflecting mirror with a steerable secondary has since been used in optical telescopes, in particular, the Hobby–Eberly Telescope

Construction began in mid-1960, with the telescope operational about three years later. The telescope's and the supporting observatory's official opening as the Arecibo Ionospheric Observatory (AIO) was held on November 1, 1963.

=== Upgrades ===
Since its construction, the telescope was upgraded several times, following the facility's oversight from the DoD to the National Science Foundation on October 1, 1969, and subsequent renaming of the AIO to the National Astronomy and Ionosphere Center (NAIC) in September 1971.

Initially, when the maximum expected operating frequency was about 500 MHz, the surface consisted of half-inch galvanized wire mesh laid directly on the support cables. In 1973, a high-precision surface consisting of 38,000 individually adjustable aluminum panels replaced the old wire mesh, and the highest usable frequency rose to about 5000 MHz.

A Gregorian reflector system was installed in 1997, incorporating secondary and tertiary reflectors to focus radio waves to one point. This allowed installing a suite of receivers, covering the full 1–10 GHz range, that could be easily moved to the focal point, giving Arecibo more flexibility. The additional instrumentation added 270 tonnes (300 short tons) to the platform, so six additional support cables were added, two for each tower. A metal mesh screen was also installed around the perimeter to block the ground's thermal radiation from reaching the feed antennas. As part of this upgrade, the power of the 2380 MHz transmitter was doubled to 1 MW by adding a second Klystron tube and improving the design.

Finally, in 2013 with a grant of US$2.5 million, work for adding the ionospheric modification HF facility began, which was completed in 2015. The HF facility consisted, on the sender side, of six foldable 100 kW crossed dipoles inside the main dish, and a hanging 100m-wide subreflector mesh between the dish and the platform.

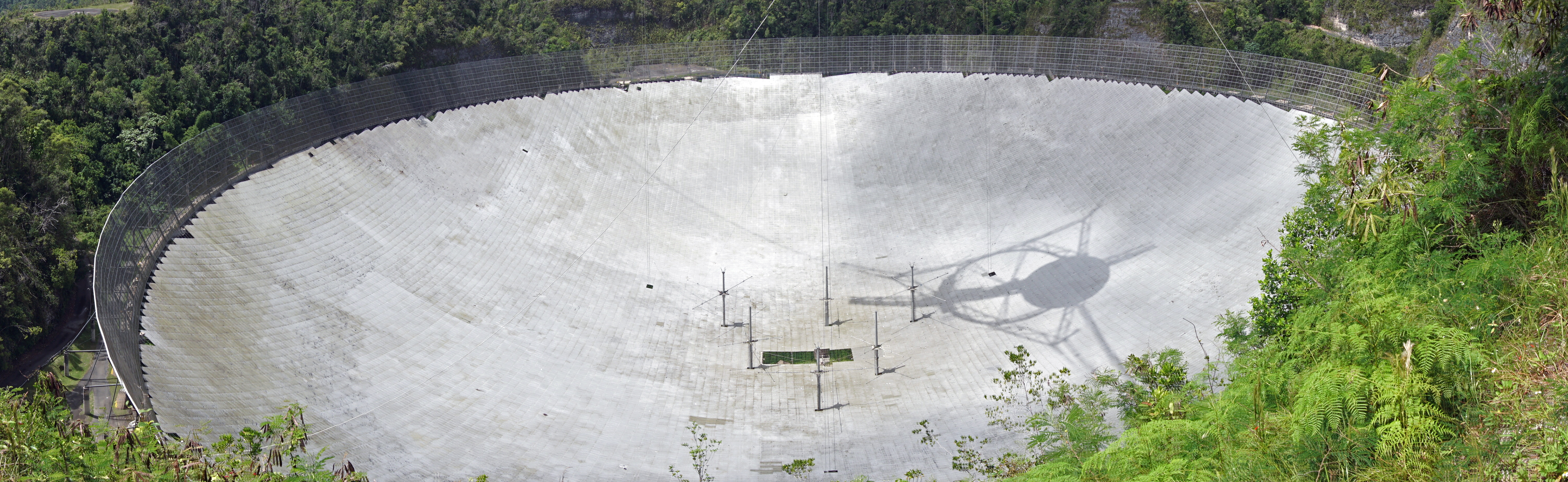
Panoramic view of the Arecibo radio telescope primary dish in June 2019. The HF transmitting antennas can be seen at the base of the dish.

=== Funding reductions ===
The Astronomical Sciences and Atmospheric Sciences divisions of the NSF had financially supported Arecibo since its completion in the 1970s, with incremental support by NASA, for operating the planetary radar. In 2001 NASA announced a rampdown and elimination of its support of the planetary radar by 2005.

In 2002, after several years of discussion, the US Congress passed a bill to double the NSF budget, and instructed the NSF to begin new projects. As a result, the NSF began committing to major projects. However, the funding increase never arrived and the NSF was left with the new commitments. In 2005 the Astronomical Sciences division commissioned a "Senior Review" of its facilities to deal with its increasingly constrained budget. The Senior Review report released in November 2006 "regretfully" recommended substantially decreased astronomy funding for the Arecibo Observatory, beginning with a cut to US$10.5 million in 2007 and continuing to decrease to US$4.0 million in 2011. The report further stated that if other sources of funding could not be found, closure of the Observatory was recommended.

Academics and researchers responded by organizing to protect and advocate for the observatory. They established the Arecibo Science Advocacy Partnership (ASAP) in 2008, to advance the scientific excellence of Arecibo Observatory research and to publicize its accomplishments in astronomy, aeronomy and planetary radar as to seek additional funding support for the observatory. An additional US$3 million in bonds were issued by the government of Puerto Rico to fund the Observatory, which were used to modernize power generation and improve other aging infrastructure. Academics, media and influential politicians pressured the United States Congress on the importance of the work of the observatory. led to additional US$3.1 million in funding to support Arecibo in the American Recovery and Reinvestment Act of 2009. This was used for basic maintenance and for a second, much smaller, antenna to be used for very long baseline interferometry, new Klystron amplifiers for the planetary radar system and student training.

Arecibo's budget from NSF continued to wane in the following years. Starting in FY2010, NASA restored its historical support by contributing $2.0 million per year for planetary science, particularly the study of near-Earth objects, at Arecibo. NASA implemented this funding through its Near Earth Object Observations program. NASA increased its support to $3.5 million per year in 2012.

In 2011, NSF removed Cornell University, which had managed the National Astronomy and Ionosphere Center (NAIC) since the 1970s, as the operator and transferred these responsibilities to SRI International, along with two other managing partners, Universities Space Research Association and Universidad Metropolitana de Puerto Rico, with a number of other collaborators. NSF also decertified NAIC as a Federally Funded Research and Development Center (FFRDC), which the NSF said would give NAIC greater freedom to establish broader scientific partnerships and pursue funding opportunities for activities beyond the scope of those supported by NSF, but which would also remove the FFRDC's promise of stability intended to retain the very best technical staff.

While the Observatory continued to operate under the reduced NSF budget and NASA funds, NSF signaled in 2015 and 2016 that it was looking towards potential decommissioning of the Observatory by initiating environmental impact statements on the effect of disassembling the unit. The NSF continued to indicate it would like to reduce funding to the Observatory in the short term. As in 2008, academics expressed their concern over the loss of scientific discoveries that could occur should the Observatory be shut down.

=== 2020 damage, decommissioning plans, and collapse ===
Map of Arecibo Observatory after November 2020 cable damage

Several hurricanes and storms over the 2010s had raised the concerns of structural engineers over the stability of the observatory. On September 21, 2017, high winds associated with Hurricane Maria caused the 430 MHz line feed to break and fall onto the primary dish, damaging roughly 30 of the 38,000 aluminum panels. Most Arecibo observations did not use the line feed but instead relied on the feeds and receivers located in the dome. Overall, the damage inflicted by Maria was minimal, but it further clouded the observatory's future. Restoring all the previous capabilities required more than the observatory's already-threatened operating budget, and users feared that the decision would be made to decommission it instead.

A consortium consisting of the University of Central Florida (UCF), Yang Enterprises and UMET came forward to supply funding in February 2018 to allow the NSF to reduce its contribution towards Arecibo's operating costs from $8 million to $2 million from the fiscal year 2022–2023, thus securing the observatory's future. With this, the UCF consortium were named the new operators of the observatory in 2018.

On August 10, 2020, an auxiliary platform support cable separated from Tower 4, causing damage to the telescope, including a 30 meters (100 ft) gash in the reflector dish. Damage included six to eight panels in the Gregorian dome, and to the platform used to access the dome. No one was reported to have been hurt by the partial collapse. The facility was closed as damage assessments were made.

The facility had recently reopened following the passing of Tropical Storm Isaias. It was unclear if the cable failure was caused by Isaias. Former Arecibo Observatory director Robert Kerr stated that prior to the 1997 installation of the Gregorian dome, the main support cables and support towers had been engineered with a safety factor of two, as to be able to sustain twice the weight of the platform. When the dome was added in 1997, the auxiliary cables were intended to retain the safety factor of two once all design factors were considered, but Kerr believed that that was never the case, as evenly distributing the loads following that install would be difficult to do. Kerr also stated that there had been periods of neglect at the Observatory, during which the fans that were used to blow dry air along the wire bundles were not operating. The earlier storms would have brought seawater to the cables, which could accelerate the rate of corrosion as well, according to Kerr. Engineering firms hired by UCF inspected the socket area where the cable had failed, and found a similar problem that had been observed in the 1980s during a routine cable replacement, in which the use of molten zinc to affix the cable to the socket mount at the tower was not complete, allowing moisture to get into the wire bundle and cause corrosion, and leading to the cable slipping from its socket. The firms had developed models of the telescope that showed that the safety factor for Tower 4 had dropped to 1.67, believing that the structure was still safe while repairs could be effected, even if another cable collapsed. Plans were made to replace all six auxiliary cables since their socket welds were all considered suspect, at a cost of US$10.5 million.

Before repairs could be started, on November 7, 2020, one of the two main support cables from Tower 4 snapped, shattering part of the dish itself as it fell. The UCF engineering staff, which had been monitoring the cables with support from the U.S. Army Corps of Engineers, and the engineering firms they had hired previously evaluated the remaining cables from Tower 4. One engineering firm proposed stabilization efforts, while another suggested that they try to sever parts of the instrument platform such as the Gregorian dome to reduce the load. The third firm made the determination that there was no way to safely repair the damage at that point, as the remaining cables could be suspect, and furthermore that a controlled decommissioning of the telescope was the only effective means to avoid catastrophic failure which would threaten the other buildings on campus. The NSF took this advice and made the announcement on November 19, 2020, that they would decommission Arecibo over the following few weeks after determining the safest route to do so, with a safety exclusion zone immediately put in place. NSF's Sean Jones stated, "This decision is not an easy one for NSF to make, but safety of people is our number one priority." The lidar facility was to remain operational.

While waiting for NSF to make the decommissioning plans, steps had been taken to try to reduce the load that each of the towers was carrying, including reducing the strain on the backstay support cables for the individual towers. Other plans, such as having helicopters hoisting part of the load while hovering above the telescope, were proposed but deemed too risky. Engineers from UCF had been monitoring the telescope and observed that wires in the backstay cables for the support towers had been breaking at a rate of one or two a day, and estimated that the telescope would soon collapse. In the weekend prior to December 1, 2020, wire strands in the receiver's supporting cables had also been snapping apart at a rapid rate, according to Ángel Vázquez, the director of operations. This culminated in the collapse of the receiver platform at around 6:55 a.m. AST (10:55 UTC) on December 1, 2020, as the second main cable from Tower 4 failed, with the other two remaining support cables failing moments later. The collapse of the receiver structure and cables onto the dish caused extensive additional damage. As the receiver fell, it also sheared the tips of the towers which the support cables ran through. Once the main cables from Tower 4 released, the backstay cables, which normally balanced the horizontal component of force from the main cables, pulled the tower outwards and broke off the top. The other two towers, once the force of supporting the platform was released, also had their tips sheared off due to the backstay cable tension. The top of Tower 12 caused some structural damage to other buildings on the observatory as it fell. No injuries from the collapse were reported.

Collapse of Arecibo radio telescope captured from the control tower (Tower 12) camera. Tower 4 can be seen in the background, while the top of Tower 12 appears rolling in front of the camera later in the video.

Collapse of the Arecibo telescope from the vantage point of a drone initially monitoring the cables at the top of Tower 4.

Synchronized views of the Arecibo Telescope collapse.

=== Post-collapse ===
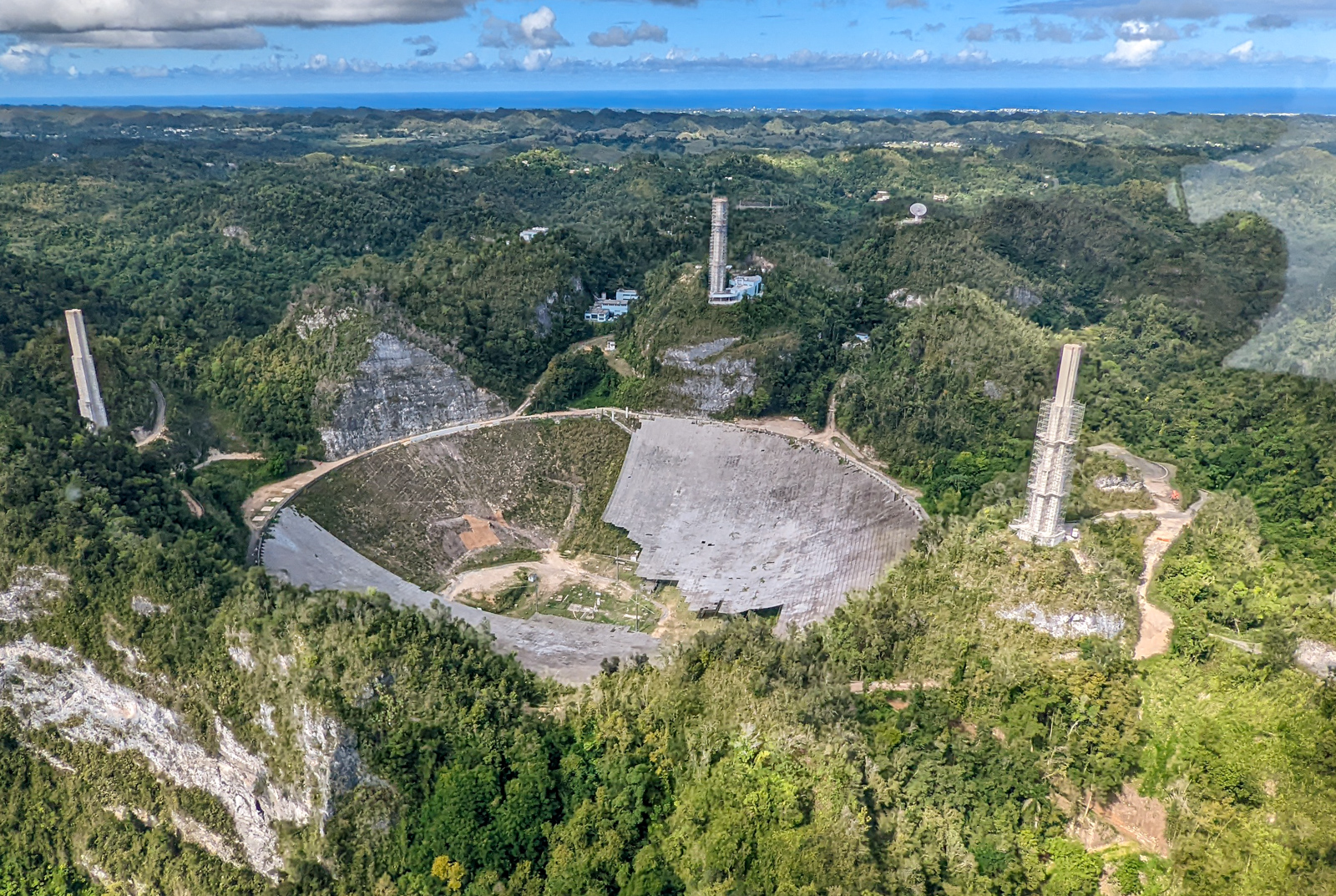
The Arecibo Telescope during demolition process, December 2021

In the weeks following Arecibo's collapse, the administration of the Five-hundred-metre Aperture Spherical Telescope (FAST) in China, which had drawn some design principles from Arecibo, stated that they would start taking applications for international researchers to use the telescope starting in 2021.

In late December 2020, Wanda Vázquez Garced, then governor of Puerto Rico signed an executive order for $8 million for the removal of debris and for the design of a new observatory to be built in its place. The governor stated reconstruction of the observatory is a "matter of public policy". The executive order also designated the area as a historical site.

As required by the Consolidated Appropriations Act, 2021, the NSF sent a report to Congress in March 2022 "on the causes and extent of the damage, the plan to remove debris in a safe and environmentally sound way, the preservation of the associated [Arecibo Observatory] facilities and surrounding areas, and the process for determining whether to establish comparable technology at the site, along with any associated cost estimates". On March 25, 2022, a survey salvage committee formed by UCF and the NSF issued a final report, identifying materials from the site that may be salvaged for their "historic importance or scientific utility."

A team from the University of Texas at Austin was able to completely recover and back up the 3 petabytes of data that the telescope had captured since opening in the 1960s by May 2021 before further harm could come to the storage equipment. The data was relocated to the school's servers at the Texas Advanced Computing Center to be made available for continued research.

An early plan developed by NSF scientists suggest one possible replacement called the Next Generation Arecibo Telescope, using 1000 closely-packed 9-meter (30 ft) telescopes mounted on one or more flat plate(s) that would cover the 300-meter (980 ft) width of the Arecibo sinkhole. While the telescopes themselves would be fixed, the plate(s) would be able to be rotated more than 45° off the horizontal in any direction. This would allow the new instrument to have 500 times the field of view of the original Arecibo Telescope, and be twice as sensitive with four times the radar power. It was expected this would cost roughly US$450 million to build. This would enable better study of the supermassive black hole at the center of the Milky Way as a prime target.

NSF decided in October 2022 that the Arecibo site would not be used for a new telescope, instead converting the site to be a STEM educational center.

The Arecibo Salvage Survey committee preserved some parts of the telescope, including parts of the zenith and azimuth tracks, a corner of the platform, the rotary joint, and the cable car.

In 2024 the National Academies of Sciences, Engineering and Medicine issued a report on the collapse. The report cited many of the previous reports and findings, including the role of the high-energy output interacting with the zinc wire rope "booming". Issues of redundancy, a typical engineering principle, was raised since there was no provision for major overhauls. The report also discussed the organizational issues of transfer of knowledge over time regarding various long term maintenance issues. It also raised the issue of the original engineering safety standards available in the 1980s versus the later advances in wind load engineering.

== Research and discoveries ==
The Arecibo message with added color to highlight the separate parts. The actual binary transmission carried no color information.

Many scientific discoveries were made with the observatory. On April 7, 1964, soon after it began operating, Gordon Pettengill's team used it to determine that the rotation period of Mercury was not 88 days, as formerly thought, but only 59 days. In 1968, the discovery of the periodicity of the Crab Pulsar (33 milliseconds) by Richard V. E. Lovelace and others provided the first solid evidence that neutron stars exist. In 1974, Hulse and Taylor discovered the first binary pulsar PSR B1913+16, an accomplishment for which they later received the Nobel Prize in Physics. In 1982, the first millisecond pulsar, PSR B1937+21, was discovered by Donald C. Backer, Shrinivas Kulkarni, Carl Heiles, Michael Davis, and Miller Goss. This object spins 642 times per second and, until the discovery of PSR J1748-2446ad in 2005, was identified as the fastest-spinning pulsar.

In 1980, Arecibo made the first radar observation of a comet when it successfully detected Comet Encke. In July 1985, the observatory obtained the first two-dimensional image of an asteroid, 1627 Ivar.

In August 1989, radar observations of near-Earth asteroid 4769 Castalia yielded a sequence of delay–Doppler images showing two lobes in contact, providing the first observation of a contact binary. The following year, Polish astronomer Aleksander Wolszczan made the discovery of pulsar PSR B1257+12 (Lich), which later led him to discover its three orbiting planets. These were the first extrasolar planets discovered. In 1994, John Harmon used the Arecibo Radio Telescope to map the distribution of ice in the polar regions of Mercury.

In January 2008, detection of prebiotic molecules methanimine and hydrogen cyanide were reported from the observatory's radio spectroscopy measurements of the distant starburst galaxy Arp 220.

From January 2010 to February 2011, astronomers Matthew Route and Aleksander Wolszczan detected bursts of radio emission from the T6.5 brown dwarf 2MASS J10475385+2124234. This was the first time that radio emission had been detected from a T dwarf, which has methane absorption lines in its atmosphere. It is also the coolest brown dwarf (at a temperature of ~900K) from which radio emission has been observed. The highly polarized and highly energetic radio bursts indicated that the object has a >1.7 kG-strength magnetic field and magnetic activity similar to both the planet Jupiter and the Sun.

=== The Arecibo message ===
In 1974, the Arecibo message, an attempt to communicate with potential extraterrestrial life, was transmitted from the radio telescope toward the globular cluster Messier 13, about 25,000 light-years away. The 1,679 bit pattern of 1s and 0s defined a 23 by 73 pixel bitmap image that included numbers, stick figures, chemical formulas and a crude image of the telescope.

=== SETI and METI projects ===
Search for extraterrestrial intelligence (SETI) is the search for extraterrestrial life or advanced technologies. SETI aims to answer the question "Are we alone in the Universe?" by scanning the skies for transmissions from intelligent civilizations elsewhere in our galaxy.

In comparison, METI (messaging to extraterrestrial intelligence) refers to the active search by transmitting messages.

Arecibo was the source of data for the SETI@home and Astropulse distributed computing projects put forward by the Space Sciences Laboratory at the University of California, Berkeley, and was used for the SETI Institute's Project Phoenix observations. The Einstein@Home distributed computing project has found more than 20 pulsars in Arecibo data.

=== Other uses ===
Terrestrial aeronomy experiments at Arecibo included the Coqui 2 experiment, supported by NASA. The telescope also originally had military intelligence uses, including locating Soviet radar installations by detecting their signals bouncing off the Moon.

Limited amateur radio operations were carried out, using Moon bounce or Earth–Moon–Earth communication, in which radio signals aimed at the Moon are reflected back to Earth. The first of these operations was on June 13–14, 1964, using the call sign KP4BPZ. A dozen or so two-way contacts were made on 144 and 432 MHz. On July 3 and 24, 1965, KP4BPZ was again activated on 432 MHz, making approximately 30 contacts on 432 MHz during the limited time slots available. For these tests, a very wide-band instrumentation recorder captured a large segment of the receiving bandwidth, enabling later verification of other amateur station call signs. These were not two-way contacts. From April 16–18, 2010, the Arecibo Amateur Radio Club KP4AO again conducted Moon-bounce activity using the antenna. On November 10, 2013, the KP4AO Arecibo Amateur Radio Club conducted a Fifty-Year Commemoration Activation, lasting seven hours on 14.250 MHz SSB, without using the main dish antenna.

== Cultural significance ==
Due to its unique shape and concept, the telescope had been featured in many contemporary works. It serves as one of the central locations in the 1972 novel The Listeners and the 1996 novel The Sparrow. It was used as a filming location in the films GoldenEye (1995), Species (1995), and Contact (1997) (based on Carl Sagan's novel of the same name, which also featured the observatory), The Losers (2010), , as the climatic battleground against Ultron in Season 3 of Avengers Assemble, and in The X-Files episode "Little Green Men". One map in the 2013 video game Battlefield 4, while set in China, is based on the distinctive layout of the Arecibo Telescope. In 2014, a video art installation piece titled The Great Silence by artists Jennifer Allora and Guillermo Calzadilla in collaboration with science fiction writer Ted Chiang featured the radio telescope at Arecibo Observatory to represent the search for extraterrestrial life. The next year, Chiang published a novelette also called The Great Silence. The juxtaposed text was later published as a short story with the same title in a special issue of the art journal e-flux in 2015 and was included in the author's short story collection Exhalation: Stories in 2019.

The asteroid 4337 Arecibo is named after the observatory by Steven J. Ostro, in recognition of the observatory's contributions to the characterization of Solar System bodies.

== See also ==
- List of radio telescopes
- Lunar Crater Radio Telescope - a proposed project by NIAC to place a radio telescope on the far side of the Moon
- Orgov Radio-Optical Telescope
