= Thomas Dunbabin =

British archaeologist (1911–1955)

Thomas James Dunbabin
- Born: 12 April 1911; Hobart, Tasmania, Australia
- Died: 31 March 1955 (aged 43)
- Military career
- Allegiance: Australia
- Branch: Australian Army

Thomas James Dunbabin DSO (12 April 1911 – 31 March 1955), was an Australian classical scholar and archaeologist of Tasmanian origin, as well as a renowned WWII soldier in Crete.

== Early life ==
He was born in Hobart, Tasmania, on 12 April 1911. His father was Thomas Dunbabin (1883–1973), a distinguished journalist and a contributor to Walkabout.

He attended Sydney Church of England Grammar School where he won the Cooper Prize and was a school prefect. He shared the Burke Prize for highest general proficiency in his school in 1926 and in that year achieved first class honours in English, Latin and Greek.

He studied at the University of Sydney and then moved to Corpus Christi College, Oxford. There, he won the Haigh prize and was eventually appointed Reader in Classical Archaeology and Fellow of All Souls College, specializing in the Greek colonization in Italy.

He was the assistant director of the British School of Archaeology at Athens in 1936 when he became engaged to Adelaide Doreen Delacour, the daughter of Paul Fulcrand Delacour De Labillière (1879–1946), then Bishop of Knaresborough and later Dean of Westminster, the engagement taking place on the terrace roof of the Villa Ariadne at Knossos, a short distance north of Heraklion, Crete. They married the following year and they went on to have two children, John (b.1938) and Katherine (b.1941).

== Military service ==
During World War II, he attained the rank of lieutenant colonel as a SOE Field Commander behind enemy lines in occupied Crete. Remembered as a particularly modest man, he was, from 1942, the senior British liaison officer with the resistance and it was during this period he earned his DSO. He used the Greek codename Yanni and was also known to locals as Tom. His role was made more difficult by the rivalry between various Greek resistance groups. Those he worked with on the island included Patrick Leigh Fermor, Xan Fielding, John Pendlebury, Manolis Paterakis, Sandy Rendel, and Dennis Ciclitira. One of the operations carried out was the notorious capture of General Heinrich Kreipe in April 1944, in which, however, Dunbabin played no active part due to illness. (In her 1973 book The Villa Ariadne, Dilys Powell writes: “Whether Tom Dunbabin approved of the plan I very much doubt; level-headed, he may have feared the consequences for the Cretans.")

In his translation of George Psychoundakis’, The Cretan Runner (1993), Leigh Fermor records: “Tom Dunbabin – O Tom – raggedest of guerrillas, a scholar gypsy, Fellow of All Souls in peace-time, distinguished classical scholar and author of The Western Greeks… who eventually became head of mission…” The resistance recollections of Psychoundakis fully document his memories of Dunbabin’s activities on Crete.

Dunbabin was sent in 1945 to Athens to work as the director of the Monuments, Fine Arts, and Archives section in Greece.

For his services to the country, on 16 January 1948 the Greek state awarded him the Gold Cross of the Royal Order of the Phoenix (Τάγμα του Φοίνικος - Χρυσούς Σταυρός.

Dunbabin's obituary in the London Times notes his finest achievement was using his influence to keep peace between various partisan groups and is credited with saving the island from the turmoil experienced on the mainland during the Greek Civil War.

A transcription of Dunbabin's own account of his time on Crete was prepared by his nephew, also named Tom Dunbabin, and published as T.J. Dunbabin: An archaeologist at war (in Greek and English) in 2015 by the Society of Cretan Historical Studies, Heraklion.

== Post-war career ==
He returned to Oxford after the war where in 1945 he became a Reader in classical archaeology under Sir John Beazley. In 1952, as a Leverhulme Research Follow, he travelled widely to examine artefacts indicating oriental influence on Greek culture of the 7th century. This resulted in his book, The Western Greeks; The History of Sicily and South Italy from the Foundation of the Greek Colonies to 480 B.C. (1948).

Dunbabin died from pancreatic cancer on 31 March 1955, twelve days before his 44th birthday. He was survived by his wife and two children, as well as, among other relatives, his father.

Memorial services were held both in Athens and on Crete. In Athens, the funeral oration was delivered by the Cretan politician Emmanouil Papadoyannis, who had been a member of the resistance; on Crete the oration was given by Patrick Leigh-Fermor.

== Sources ==
Of particular relevance as sources of information on Dunbabin are Peter Monteath’s 2018 essay for the online journal Intelligence and National Security, and Antonis Kotsonas’ 2020 contribution in The Bulletin of the Australian Archaeological Institute at Athens. Both have bibliographies for further reading and rare photographs.

== See also ==
- George Doundoulakis
- Helias Doundoulakis
