= Dennis Ciclitira =

Dennis John Ciclitira
- Διονύσης Τσικλητήρας
- Born: 11 August 1918; Patras, Greece
- Died: 9 June 2000 (aged 81)
- Military career
- Allegiance: United Kingdom
- Branch: British Army
- Service years: 1939–1945
- Rank: Major
- Units: Essex Regiment; South Staffordshire Regiment; Special Operations Executive
- Conflicts: World War II
- Other work: Businessman

Dennis John Ciclitira (Greek: Διονύσης Τσικλητήρας; 11 August 1918 – 9 June 2000) was a British soldier and businessman of Greek descent.

== Early life and education ==
Ciclitira was born in Patras, Greece, but his family emigrated to England, settling in Westcliff-on-Sea, Essex. His father Demosthenes set up a company importing dried fruit. Ciclitira was educated at Wycliffe School and was then sent to Greece to learn the family business.

== Military service in World War II ==
In 1939 Ciclitira enlisted into the Territorial Army, serving in the 2/4th Essex Regiment, before graduating from an Officer Cadet Training Unit and being commissioned as a second lieutenant in the South Staffordshire Regiment on 20 April 1940.

After two years with the South Staffordshire Regiment, Ciclitira volunteered to serve with the Special Operations Executive, and in October 1942 was assigned to "Force 133", SOE's Cretan section, based in Cairo. He was responsible for organising clandestine deliveries of arms and supplies to the Cretan resistance, and also the exfiltration of those for whom it had become too dangerous to remain. In December 1943 Ciclitira took over from Xan Fielding as commander of SOE activities in western Crete, operating from a mountain hideout near Canea. In May 1944, after the abduction of General Kreipe, Ciclitira organized the evacuation of Patrick Leigh Fermor, W. Stanley Moss, and their captive by Motor Launch, and met them at a remote beach on the southern coast. Just as Leigh Fermor and Moss realised that neither knew enough Morse to make the correct recognition code Ciclitira arrived, having been ordered to return to Cairo, took the torch, called them "bloody fools", and made the correct signal.

Ciclitira returned to Crete in September 1944, remaining there until the end of the war. In March 1945, he negotiated a prisoner exchange, swapping 36 German prisoners for 12 Cretans, including Konstantinos Mitsotakis, later the Prime Minister of Greece. On 8 May 1945, V-E day, Ciclitira arranged for Generalmajor Hans-Georg Benthack to formally surrender all German forces on the island to Major-General Colin Callander.

== Post-war career ==
On 23 May 1946, Ciclitira received a mention in despatches "in recognition of gallant and distinguished services in the Mediterranean Theatre".

His father having died in 1943, Ciclitira and his brother John revived the family business in the late 1950s, forming Demos Ciclitira Ltd. The company remains one of the UK's leading importers of dried fruit, as well as other products. It was run by Ciclitira's nephew Andrew until the latter's death in December 2020; the Company Chairman is now Andrew's brother David.

Dennis Ciclitira died on 9 June 2000.
