= André Gerolymatos =

Greek-Canadian historian and professor (1951–2019)

André Gerolymatos (2 September 1951 – 30 May 2019) was a Greek-Canadian historian and professor who held the Hellenic Canadian Congress of BC Chair in Hellenic Studies, and served as director of the Stavros Niarchos Foundation Centre for Hellenic Studies at Simon Fraser University.

== Early life ==
Andre Gerolymatos was born in Kefalonia, Greece on 2 September 1951. After moving to Montreal, Quebec, Canada Dr. Gerolymatos studied classics at Loyola College (Dipl.), Concordia University (BA), and McGill University (MA), before switching to History for his PhD, also at McGill. He was a specialist in military and diplomatic history. His dissertation researched British Intelligence and the Guerilla Warfare Operations during the Second World War in Greece (1941–1944). He taught at McGill University, and opened the first Hellenic Studies Centre in Montreal at Dawson College, where he served as its founding director between 1986 and 1996. During this time he also worked for Minister Michel Dupuy as a senior political advisor in Ottawa.

== Simon Fraser University ==
Gerolymatos was appointed the inaugural Hellenic Canadian Congress of BC Chair in Hellenic Studies in 1996. Starting off as a sole professorship, Dr. Gerolymatos expanded Hellenic Studies at SFU, culminating in the founding of the Stavros Niarchos Foundation Centre for Hellenic Studies in 2011. With the establishment of the Stavros Niarchos Foundation Centre for Hellenic Studies and as its first director, Dr. Gerolymatos established Hellenic Studies as an independent program at Simon Fraser University, one of the few remaining in North America. The Stavros Niarchos Foundation Centre for Hellenic Studies not only emphasizes academic excellence, but community outreach as well. In line with Dr. Gerolymatos personal goal, as well as SFU's institutional objective of furthering community engagement and knowledge, Dr. Gerolymatos was a founding member and co-director of the Terrorism, Risk, and Security Studies Professional Master's Program as well as helping to launch the world's first online language learning platform designed specifically for the Modern Greek Language. The technology developed during this project has continued to evolve and has been used to support Arabic, French, and Italian, as well as thirteen critically endangered First Nations languages in Western Canada in partnership with the First Nations Language Centre at SFU.

== Other works ==
Gerolymatos was actively engaged in both the Canadian-Greek community as well as the broader diaspora. He also held numerous positions outside of academia and gave back to the broader public through his active engagement with the media, and through his role on the Advisory Council on National Security and as a Member of the Board for the Alexander S. Onassis Foundation, New York. Dr. Gerolymatos’ contributions were recognized both by the academic community and various other agencies and governments. His awards and distinctions include: running with the Olympic flame Vancouver (2010), The Order of Phoenix-Hellenic Republic (2011), and the HRH Queen Elizabeth the Second Diamond Jubilee Medal for Service to Canada (2012) as well as Simon Fraser University honour for his services through engagement with the media (2012).

== Bibliography ==
- Guerrilla Warfare and Espionage in Greece 1940–1944, Pella Publishing Company, New York 1992, pp. 400.
- The Balkan Wars: Myth, Reality and the Eternal Conflict, (Toronto: Stoddart Publishing Co. April 2001).
- Espionage and Treason: A Study of the Proxenia in Political and Military Intelligence Gathering in Classical Greece, J.C. Gieben Publishers, Amsterdam, 1986, pp. 140. Translated into Greek as Kataskopia stin Archaia Ellada [Espionage in Ancient Greece] (Kaktos Publishers, Athens 2001)
- The Balkan Wars: Conquest, Revolution and Retribution from the Ottoman Era to the Twentieth Century and Beyond. Basic Books, New York, 2002.
- Red Acropolis, Black Terror: The Greek Civil War and the Origins of Soviet-American Rivalry, 1943–1949 (2004).
- Castles Made of Sand: A Century of Anglo-American Espionage and Intervention in the Middle East (2010).
- An International Civil War: Greece, 1943–1949 (2016).
- The British and the Greek Resistance, 1936–1944: Spies, Saboteurs, and Partisans (2018).
