= List of prisons in Greece =

This is a list of prisons in Greece.

== Adult and juvenile prisons and detention facilities in Greece ==
Special Adult Detention Establishments - Rural Prisons

1. Agia (Crete) Prison
2. Cassandra Prison
3. Tyrintha Prison
4. Central Prison Supply Storage Centre (Kayf)

Special Juvenile Establishments

1. Avlona Special Juvenile Detention Establishment (Ekkn)
2. Volos Special Juvenile Detention Establishment (Ekkn)
3. Kassavetia Rural Penitentiary Establishment for Minors (Aska)

Therapeutic Establishments

1. Korydallos Psychiatric Establishment for Prisoners
2. Korydallos Hospital for Prisoners
3. Eleona of Thiva Drug Rehabilitation Centre for Prisoners

Closed Prisons

1. Central Prison for Women
2. Patras Prison
3. Halkida Prison
4. Corfu Prison
5. Alikarnassos Prison
6. Trikala Prison
7. Malandrinos Detention Establishment
8. Domokos Prison

Judicial Prisons

1. Korydallos Prison
2. Ioannina Prison
3. Komotini Prison
4. Corinth Prison
5. Thessaloniki Prison
6. Larissa Prison
7. Nafplio Prison
8. Neapolis Prison
9. Tripoli Prison
10. Chania Prison
11. Chios Prison
12. Kos Prison
13. Amfissa Preventorium for Prisoners
- Korydallos Prison, Korydallos
- Ioannia Prison, Ioannia
- Komotini Prison, Komotini
- Corinth Prison, Corinth
- Thessaloniki Prison, Thessaloniki
- Larissa Prison, Larissa
- Nafplio Prison, Nafplio
- Neapolis Prison, Neapolis
- Tripoli Prison, Tripoli
- Chania Prison, Chania
- Chios Prison, Chios
- Kos Prison, Kos
- Amfissa Preventorium For Prisoners, Amfissa
