= Morale Operations Branch =

Military unit specializing in psychological warfare

Agency overview
- Formed: 3 March 1943
- Dissolved: 1945
- Agency executives: Frederick Cable Oechsner, Chief (1943–1944); Kenneth D. Mann, Chief (1944–1945)
- Parent department: Office of Strategic Services

Morale Operations was a branch of the Office of Strategic Services during World War II. It utilized psychological warfare, particularly propaganda, to produce specific psychological reactions in both the general population and military forces of the Axis powers in support of larger Allied political and military objectives.

== Origins ==
William Joseph Donovan formed the Morale Operations Branch of the Office of Strategic Services on March 3, 1943. Donovan admired the perceived effectiveness of Nazi propaganda and saw the United States' lack of similar operations as a significant weakness. To that end, he created the Morale Operations branch, which used many different tactics in both the informational and physical domains to sap morale, induce confusion and sow distrust within the populations of Axis countries and within the ranks of their armed forces.

Donovan held the belief that warfare should be conducted with an eye specifically to the psychological effect of both the actions and deeds of parties to a conflict both upon the constituent populations of the warring parties and the armed forces of the parties themselves, asserting that such psychological considerations are as important in devising wartime strategy as any other factor considered in planning a military campaign.

In a speech delivered by then Colonel Donovan, he cites the specific importance of the psychological effect of both physical action and communication in warfare: "The element of surprise in military operations, which is psychological warfare translated into field tactics, is achieved by artifice and stratagem, by secrecy and rapidity of information, by mystifying and misleading the enemy. When you strike at the morale of a people or any army, you strike at the deciding factor, because it is the strength of their will that determines the length of wars, the measure of resistance, and the day of final collapse."

Donovan on psychological warfare

In the same speech, Donovan somewhat incorrectly cites Adolf Hitler's assertion from Mein Kampf as an example of how Nazi Germany paid considerable attention to the psychological aspects of warfare in preparation for hostilities in the late 1930s: "The place of the artillery barrage as preparation for infantry attack will be taken, in the future, by revolutionary propaganda. Its task is to break down the enemy physically before the armies begin to function at all."

Donovan's template for the organization of the Morale Operations Branch may be attributed loosely to the 'black' propaganda elements of the British Political Warfare Executive (PWE), upon which OSS personnel drew heavily for guidance in designing the makeup and mission of the Morale Operations Branch.

Though MO Branch drew a great deal of its origins from the British PWE, there was tension between the US and British agencies on the use of what was then referred to as 'Terror Propaganda.' Donovan viewed Hitler's use of the threat of overwhelming violence followed by ultimatums for surrender as tactics that could be made to backfire, and took issue with Churchill's focus on 'unconditional surrender' as the only option for Nazi Germany following an Allied victory. In a document outlining the purpose of the OSS to President Roosevelt, he wrote the following: "Espionage is not a nice thing, nor are the methods employed exemplary. Neither are demolition bombs nor poison gas, but our country is a nice thing and our independence is indispensable. We face an enemy who believes one of his chief weapons is that none but he will employ terror. But we will turn terror against him - or we will cease to exist."

This statement, and the guiding principles Donovan set down for the OSS which placed a premium on the importance of 'influence' as the primary objective of many of the OSS's operations, set the tone for the activities of the entire service during its lifespan until 1945.

Use of Terror Propaganda

== Organization ==
The Morale Operations Branch comprised five sections;

- Special Communications Detachment
- Radio Division
- Special Contacts Division
- Publications and Campaigns Division
- Foreign Division.

The Special Communications Detachment was responsible for "combat propaganda operations in coordination with the U.S. Army in Europe." The Radio Division "conducted all black or clandestine radio programs." The Special Contacts Division "distributed propaganda to partisan groups." The Publications and Campaigns Division "produced leaflets, pamphlets, and whispering campaigns." The Foreign Division "conducted miscellaneous [Morale Operations] activities abroad." Collectively these divisions carried out psychological warfare operations for the U.S. Army.

The Morale Operations Branch had outposts in several locations across the globe. Usually these stations were close to U.S. Army combat stations or integrated into Army intelligence posts. By 1945 the Morale Operations Branch had one station in Algeria, Egypt, France, and Britain, two in Sweden, and six in Italy. The most important of these stations was in London, Britain.

== Relationship with other wartime information agencies ==
=== Relationship with Political Warfare Executive ===
The Morale Operations Branch gained a great deal of its early sources of information through its liaison relationship with the British Political Warfare Executive. This relationship was to continue for the duration of the war, and would vary in intensity given the particular inclinations of various officers involved with Morale Operations in the OSS and their British counterparts. The Morale Operations Branch took much inspiration for its tactical campaigns from tactics developed by the British, some of which dealt with the regular dissemination of rumors into sources of popular media in Axis occupied or neutral countries.

=== Relationship with Office of War Information ===
The US Office of War Information was an office within the Executive Branch resulting from the consolidation of many of the more overt information dissemination services managed by the US government during the war. In June 1942, the OWI gained some of the overt broadcast components of the OSS's predecessor, Donovan's Office of the Coordinator of Information, while the more covert components charged with the conduct of subversion and deception became part of the MO Branch. Among other US media notables enlisted to serve the government during the war, playwright Robert E. Sherwood played a large role in determining the character and functions of both the OWI and MO Branch. Sherwood served as an advisor to both organizations, and contributed greatly to many of Donovan's plans for coordinated psychological warfare against the Axis powers throughout the war.

No ministry of propaganda

Archibald MacLeish, another luminary of the American media community also served a critical role in advising both the MO Branch and OWI, serving as the director of OWI's Office of Facts and Figures and as senior advisor to OSS's Research and Analysis Branch on matters pertaining to Psychological Warfare strategy.

The MO Branch and OWI coordinated their activities by design, to the point the OWI occasionally allowed subversive content to be injected into overt OWI broadcasts in order to enhance the effect of covert MO Branch activities overseas.

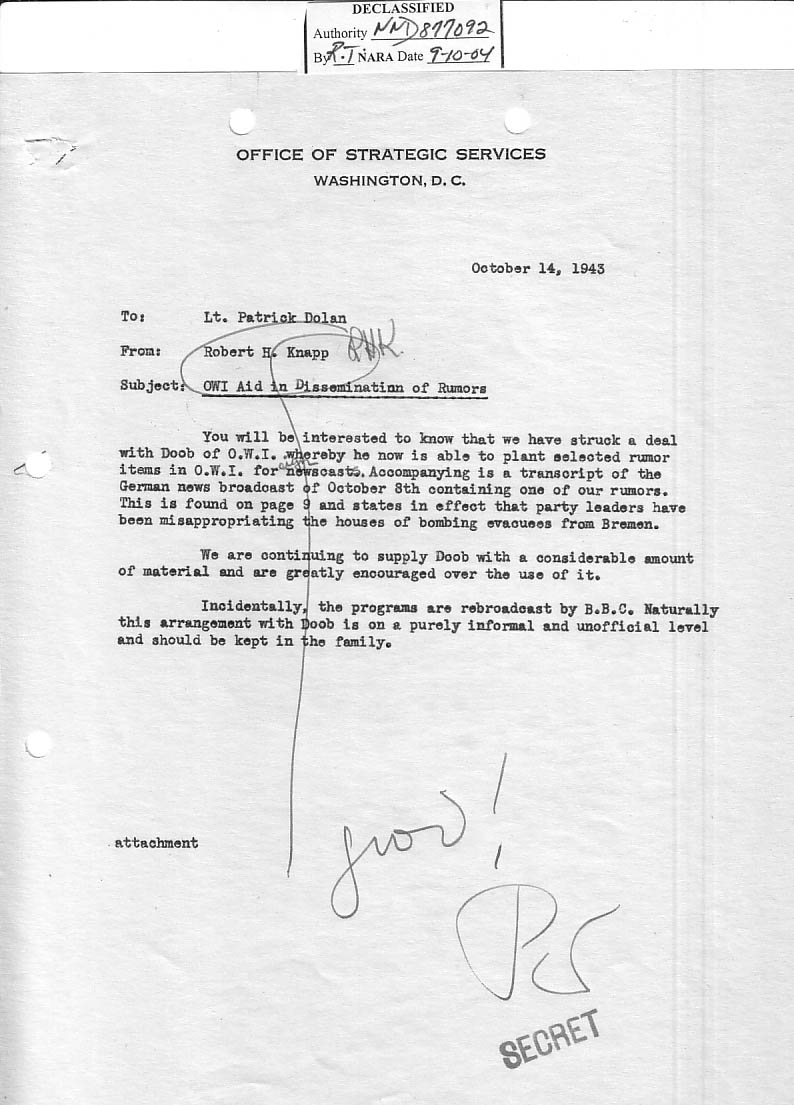
OWI black propaganda memo, 1943

=== Relationship with Supreme Headquarters Allied Expeditionary Force Psychological Warfare Division (PWD/SHAEF) ===
MO Branch additionally maintained operational detachments that were attached to major maneuver units of the US military under the operational control of the Supreme Headquarters Allied Expeditionary Force. These tactical teams were divided into three distinct categories: Combat Teams, Occupational Teams and Base Teams.

Psychological Warfare Branch Field Teams Memo

== Campaigns ==
=== Leaflets ===
==== Fünf Minuten ====
The 'Fünf Minuten' leaflet campaign (translated as 'Five Minutes' from German) centered on inculcating a sense of futility within the German military and general German citizenry based on the industrial and manufacturing supremacy of the combined allied economies. The graphic leaflets dropped behind Axis lines presented audiences with facts about the number of US warplanes produced every five minutes in the United States in order to lead the audience to the conclusion that no matter how many US aircraft the Luftwaffe brought down, there were dozens more on the way. The central focus of this leaflet campaign was twofold - both to demoralize the German military by presenting them with odds that cannot be overcome, and instilling a sense of inferiority in the industrial workers that made up Germany's wartime manufacturing base.

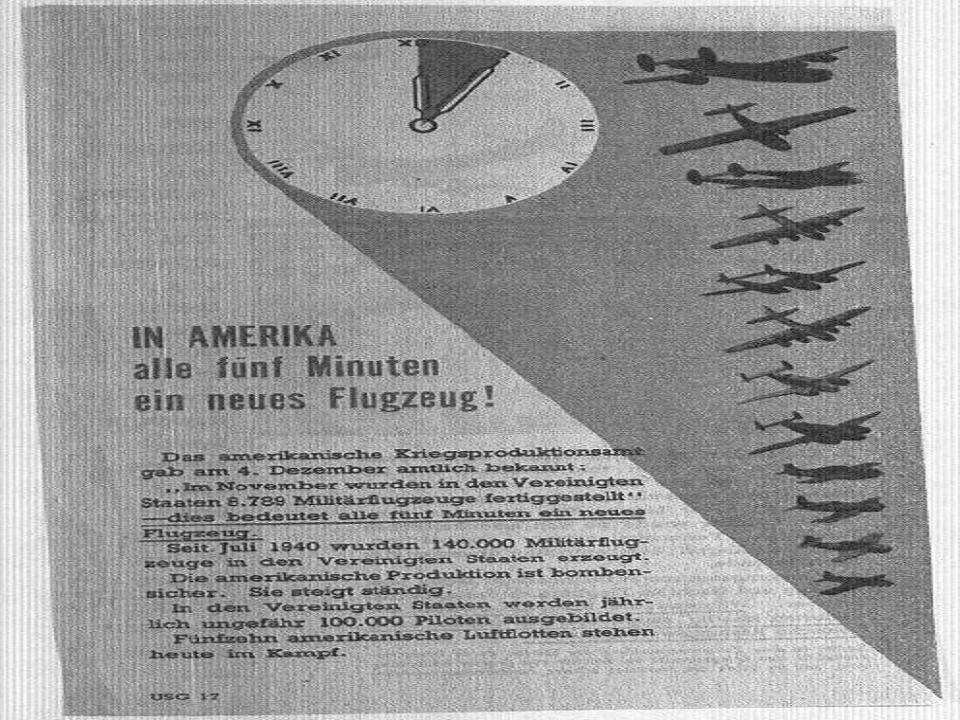
Fünf Minuten leaflet

Leaflet samples

==== How Much Longer? ====
The "How Much Longer?" campaign was the first major black propaganda leaflet campaign. The campaign produced sixteen different leaflets. Each of these featured a cartoon depicting a burdensome situation and asked how much longer German citizens would tolerate it. These leaflets were "distributed throughout Italy, southern France, and the Balkans."

==== Skorpion West ====
Skorpion West was another successful leaflet campaign. After the German defeat at Normandy, a German propaganda team located in France created optimistic leaflets in an effort to boost morale. Germany then airdropped these leaflets over their lines to bolster the spirits of the German soldiers.

The Morale Operations branch obtained copies of these leaflets and immediately produced their own facsimiles. The Germans believed these false documents were genuine and began distributing them. The first of these leaflets indicated that the German high command did not believe their soldiers would be able to hold the line and "encouraged soldiers to scorch the earth before dying in a last stand for Nationalist Socialism." The second ordered all soldiers to shoot any officers who attempted to surrender or retreat. A third pamphlet ordered soldiers to carry out the evacuation of civilian populations by force (Morale Operations hoped that this would create traffic congestion and clog supply lines).

Ultimately the Germans denounced all Skorpion West pamphlets, including the ones that the German propaganda team had created, as enemy propaganda and ordered all troops to ignore their messages.

=== Poison-pen letters ===
==== Operation Hemlock ====
Operation Hemlock was a poison-pen letter campaign consisting of anonymous letters sent to Gestapo officers that implicated various German soldiers and officials in pro-Allied behavior. One such letter implied that the Gestapo had killed German Major General Franz Krech after plotting to defect to the Allies. In actuality, Greek guerillas had ambushed and killed Krech.

==== Death notices ====
The Morale Operations Branch also sent letters to the families of German soldiers. These letters indicated that the recently deceased was a victim of a mercy killing at the hands of a German doctor. Other letters claimed that Nazi Party officials had stolen valuable possessions while he lay on his deathbed.

==== Lichtenau Letter ====
One Morale Operations letter appeared to be a Christmas greeting from the mayor of Lichtenau. At first glance it appeared as a morale booster for Nazi soldiers, but it also contained several indications of hardships resulting from the war. The letter included claims that government had drafted civilians into the military, that young teenagers were becoming pilots after only a few weeks of training, and that loved ones back home were sacrificing their health to promote the Nazi cause.

=== Newspapers ===
==== Das Neue Deutschland ====
The Morale Operations branch created the Das Neue Deutschland newspaper to appear as if a fictional clandestine peace party in Germany had written it. The goal of the newspaper was to promote an anti-Nazi revolution and the re-establishment of a liberal democracy. Morale Operations sent thousands of peace party membership applications to enemy soldiers and civilians in Europe, leading Himmler to denounce the paper and threaten soldiers with execution if they read it.

==== The Harvard Project ====
The Harvard Project created a four-page weekly business publication, Handel and Wandel, which appeared to analyze world economic news. The leaflet suggested that if Germany expelled the Nazi regime, Allied and German businessmen could work together to defend capitalism from an impending wave of Bolshevism.

==== Operation Cornflakes ====
During Operation Cornflakes, Morale Operations agents interviewed German POWs who had worked as mail clerks to discover how the German postal service functioned. Morale Operations then created replicas of German mailbags and stuffed them with various forms of printed propaganda. They placed these bags near trains after an Allied air raid in hopes that the Germans would believe the bags were genuine and thus unwittingly distribute the propaganda. The German postal service delivered a total 320 bags of Morale Operations propaganda. Postwar interrogations of German prisoners revealed that many soldiers received Das Neue Deutschland as a result of this operation.

=== Radio ===
==== Soldatensender ====
Soldatensender was a Morale Operations grey radio station that broadcast anti-Nazi propaganda hidden in news, music, and entertainment. It quickly became the most popular station in Western Europe. Morale Operations also used it to report news on German military failures, which eroded Nazi morale. After the 1944 coup against Hitler during Operation Valkyrie, Soldatensender broadcast the names of hundreds of Germans in an attempt to cast suspicion on as many Germans as possible. As a result of this the Gestapo arrested and executed roughly 2,500 Germans.

==== Joker Campaign ====
German General Ludwig Beck, the former German Army Chief of Staff, died after the attempt on Hitler's life during Operation Valkyrie, although the Nazi regime never acknowledged his death. During the Joker Campaign a Morale Operations agent, pretending to be Beck, broadcast several messages from London to German soldiers and civilians.These messages blamed German losses on Nazi incompetence and urged the German people to overthrow Hitler and sue for peace in hopes that this would stop the Allies from annihilating their country.

==== Volkssender Drei ====
The Volkssender Drei campaign created the first Morale Operations radio station on the European continent. An agent claiming to be Hoffman, a German commander and the son of the general who signed the Brest-Litovsk Treaty, broadcast messages on a nightly basis. These messages stated that Hoffman had liberated a small town in the mountainous region of Germany and encouraged other German commanders to do the same. The program ended in October 1944 when the Allies purportedly liberated the fictional city.

==== Operation Anne / Radio 1212 ====
Operation Anne, also known as Radio 1212, was one of the most successful radio operations of the war. It reportedly came from an anti-Nazi Rhineland group and initially provided accurate information, prompting Wehrmacht commanders to trust its information. After the Allies had broken through the Moselle region however, Radio 1212 issued false reports, evacuation and mobilization orders, and rumors in order to create maximum confusion and hysteria. The station even created a fictional resistance group and encouraged listeners to join.

=== Rumor ===
Doctrine Regarding Rumors

In coordination with the British PWE, MO Branch made significant use of carefully formulated rumors in order to cause confusion, sow distrust and ultimately incite revolt or assassination attempts in Axis occupied territory. MO Branch and PWE collaborated regularly on lists of 'sibs' (rumors) to be injected into mass media by recruited agents or to be used as themes in Allied-controlled propaganda outlets.

Targeted rumors were also designed to create the notion in Axis occupied areas that attempts had been made by their fellow countrymen on Axis leaders, and thereby motivate disenfranchised populations under Axis control to make such attempts themselves. The purpose of such tactics was twofold: at once to provoke violent action against Axis leadership in order to cause the attention of Axis intelligence and operations units to focus on the source of the rumor or actual attempt, and at the same time provide populations in occupied areas with a cause (or at least an idea) to rally around in support and hope for liberation.

Rumor as a device to instigate assassinations

Rumor as an Instrument of PW

Much of the work done in relation to rumor was directed by Robert H. Knapp, a notable academic with significant history of researching the anatomy and effectiveness of rumors. In addition to his wartime service to the OSS, he contributed readily to the body of academic knowledge on the psychology of suggestion, rumors and lies in many scholarly publications.
