= Sandy Rendel =

British diplomat and solicitor (1910–1991)

Alexander Meadows Rendel CBE (1910–1991) was a British diplomat and solicitor who also served as a Special Operations Executive agent in Crete during World War II, rising to the rank of major.

Rendel was commissioned in the Royal Artillery in May 1940. In early 1943, he met Colonel Thomas Dunbabin, a former fellow student at Corpus Christi College, Oxford, in Cairo. Dunbabin recruited Rendel to the SOE. Rendel arrived in Crete in September 1943, after being appointed in charge of Lasithi, the eastern most region. He was known to Cretans as Alexis (Greek: Αλέξης).

After the war, Rendel worked as a diplomatic correspondent for The Times. He was made a Commander of the Order of the British Empire (CBE) in the 1975 Birthday Honours.

His son was the Liberal Democrat MP David Rendel.
