= Pancretan Association of America =

North American ethnic fraternal group

The Pancretan Association of America (PAA) is an ethnic fraternal association in the United States and Canada for people of Cretan Greek ancestry.

== History ==
The Pancretan Association of America was founded in 1929. It began as a national organization when a number of local Cretan organizations that had been established in the United States in the 1910s and 1920s, such as the Omonia in New York City, Arkadi of Pittsburgh and Epimenides of San Francisco. On April 7, 1929 these groups met in New York to set up a preparatory committee to develop a general unifying federation of Cretan clubs. On October 14 of that same year a convention was held in Chicago with representatives of the above groups as well as the Cretan Fraternity of Chicago, Minos of Salt Lake City, Psilorites of Detroit, Mutual Benefit of Cleveland and Minos of Chicopee. The delegates established the Pancretan Association of America. KPHTH the newsletter of Omonia was adopted as the national publication. Women's chapters were established the following years in several cities. In 1948 a movement began to organize Cretan Youth chapters. The organization was informal and by the late 1950s only one youth chapter (in New York City) remained. A second revival of youth chapters began in 1970 and the Pancretan Youth Association (PYA) was formally reestablished in 1971. By 2015 there were 14 active PYA chapters.

== Organization ==
The operating headquarters of the PAA currently is at The Hellenic Center in Bethesda, MD. A national convention meets every two years; in the interim it has elected officers and a board of directors. The association, in 2023, has 3,500 members in 60 local chapters, including youth and women's chapters in seven districts.

The Pancretan Association is an association of chapters. Members of a chapter are automatically, in effect, members of the association. For most all chapters, a membership is open to "individuals of Cretan lineage and their spouses." However, a few chapters do allow "friends of Crete," usually limited to 5 percent of the total membership, to be full members, while some of these chapters do not permit such members to be president.

== Purpose ==
The primary purpose is to maintain and promote the Cretan culture and values among its members. The programs to accomplish this are centered on philanthropy, culture and education. The association has a large scholarship program and grants thousands of dollars annually to youth members who meet the criteria established in its constitution (a two year membership in the Pancretan is mandatory among other criteria). The PAA also donates to educational and philanthropic institutions and programs in Crete and the United States. The Association also supports its chapters with online programming and an active website (www.pancretan.org) and social media sites such as instagram (pancretanamerica) and Facebook (Pancretan Association of America). In 2022, the PAA traveled back to Crete for a highly successful one week excursion to "Discover our Roots." In 2023, the Association elected their first woman president, Diane Kounalakis.

=== Mission Statement ===
"The Pancretan Association of America (PAA) is a national organization comprised of members who support and perpetuate Cretan culture through scholarship, educational, cultural and philanthropic programs for those in the United States, Canada and in Crete. Founded by descendants from Crete, the PAA strives to promote the rich historical significance of the island, while also preserving its “philoxenia” and “philotimo.” "
