= Monument to the Dead of Rauba-Capeu =

War memorial in Nice, France

Coordinates: 43°41′38″N 7°16′52″E

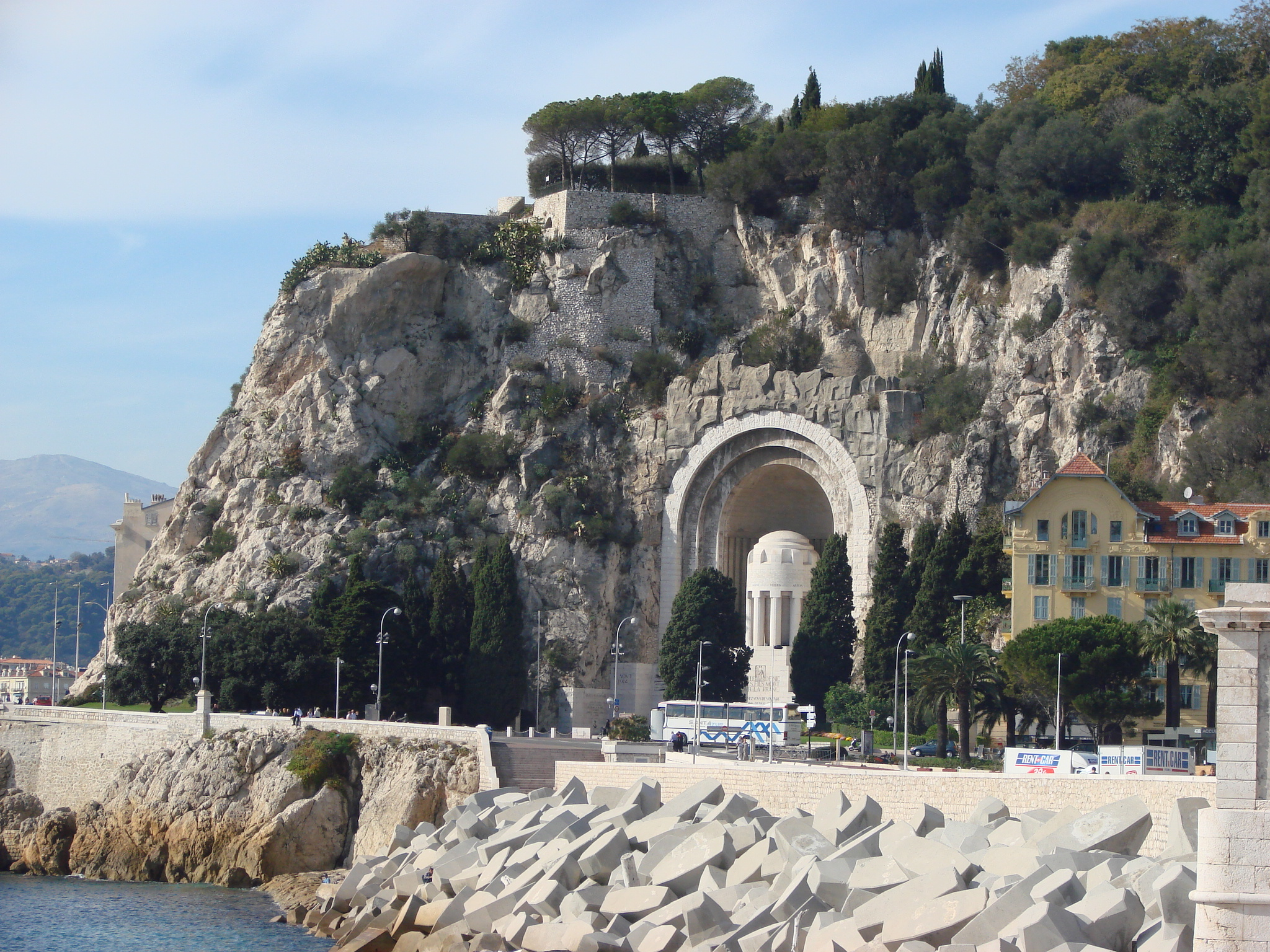
- Monument the Dead of Rauba-Capeu
- Interactive map of Monument to the Dead of Rauba-Capeu
- Location: Nice, Alpes-Maritimes, Provence-Alpes-Côte d'Azur, France
- Designer: Roger Séassal
- Beginning date: 1924
- Completion date: 1927
- Inauguration date: January 29, 1928

The Monument to the Dead of Rauba-Capeù is located at the quay Rauba-Capeù along the tourist Seaside Road (Route du bord de mer) in Nice, France. The quay takes its name from the section of the promenade des Anglais near the monument, where the wind is said to be so strong as to "steal one's cap" (rauba capeù in the dialect of niçois).

== History ==
The monument is situated on the first path cut into the rock, the ancient road Ponchettes, which joins Saleya Avenue to the Lympia harbor. The road was enlarged in 1826.

As presented by the winner of the 1913 Premier Grand Prix de Rome, Nicois architect Roger Séassal, the proposal for a monument to the war dead was approved on February 6, 1923. The first stone was placed on November 11, 1924 on the site of the ancient racetrack. It was completed in 1927 on Séassal’s plans. It was inaugurated by Marshall Foch on January 29, 1928. It was the mayor of Nice, Francois Goiran, who precipitated its construction in 1919 as a homage to Nice's war dead.

The monument obtained the label Patrimoine du XX^{e} siècle (Heritage of the Twentieth Century), on November 28, 2000, and was awarded first place among Trophées de l'Aménagement Urbain in 2004. It was designated as a monument historique on February 22, 2010, before being classed on May 24, 2011.

In 2018, a twenty-meter high reliquary sculpture in the form of a Niçois eagle was discovered concealed within the monument, containing plaques of 2,000 soldiers who lost their lives during the First World War; no records make note of it.

== Description ==
With its surroundings, the monument reaches a height of 32 meters, making it one of the tallest in France. A sundial is inscribed in its base and measures two meters around. The urn, set in an arched niche, bears the 3,665 nameplates of Niçois who lost their lives as a result of the First World War. The monument possesses two reliefs sculpted by Alfred Janniot: a relief on the monument's left is based on a theme of war; on the right, a theme of peace. The inscription which separates the reliefs reads:

The City of Nice to its sons, who died for France: Remember that which your fathers accomplished in their time and you shall have glory and an immortal name.

== See also ==
- Ministry of Culture (France)

== Bibliography ==
- Paul Isoart, « Veilleurs de pierre, mémoire des vivants. Les monuments aux morts du Comté de Nice et du Mentonnais », Nice-Historique, 1999, No. 185, pp. 193–243. (Lire en ligne)
- Bertrand Roussel; Frédéric Boyer (2025). Patrimoine historique - Les 70 sites majeurs des Alpes-Maritimes (in French). Saint-Laurent-du-Var: Éd. Mémoires Millénaires. pp. 140, 152. ISBN 978-2-487329-00-3. 70SitesMajeurs06..
