= La Maison Francaise (Rockefeller Center) =

Building in Rockefeller Center, New York City

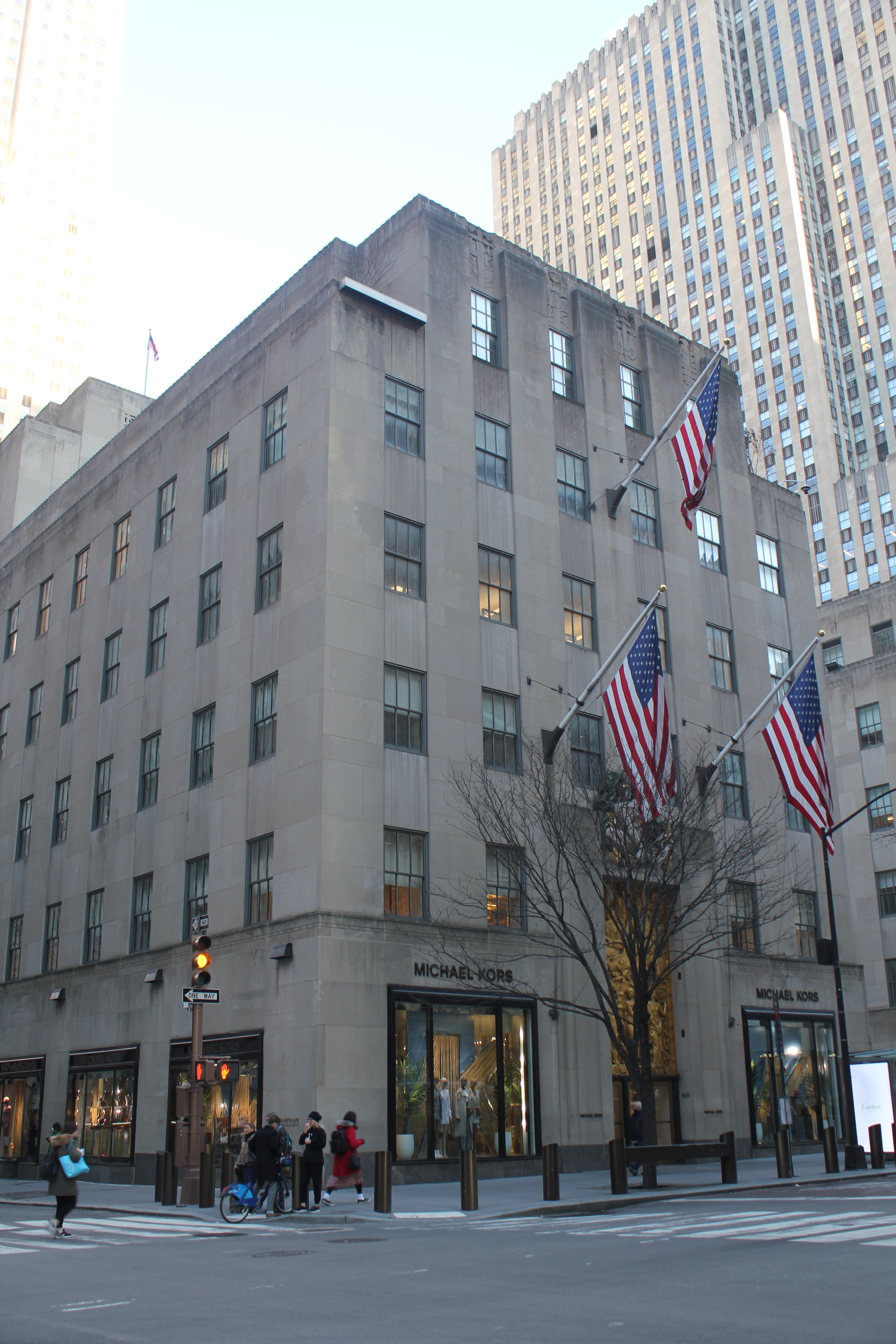
- Viewed from Fifth Avenue
- Interactive map of the La Maison Francaise area

General information
- Type: Office building
- Location: 610 5th Avenue; New York, NY 10112
- Coordinates: 40.75856°N 73.97792°W
- Completed: 1933
- Owner: Tishman Speyer

Height
- Roof: 90 ft (27 m) (excluding penthouse)

Technical details
- Floor count: 6 (+1 1/2-story penthouse)

Design and construction
- Architects: Associated Architects, including Raymond Hood
- Developer: John D. Rockefeller Jr.
- Structural engineer: Post & McCord
- La Maison Francaise
- U.S. Historic district – Contributing property
- New York City Landmark
- Area: 22 acres (8.9 ha)
- Architect: Raymond Hood
- Architectural style: Modern, Art Deco
- Part of: Rockefeller Center (ID87002591)
- NYCL No.: 1446

Significant dates
- Added to NRHP: December 23, 1987
- Designated CP: December 23, 1987
- Designated NYCL: April 23, 1985

La Maison Francaise (French: La Maison Française, literally French House), also known by its address 610 Fifth Avenue, is a commercial building at Rockefeller Center in the Midtown Manhattan neighborhood of New York City. Completed in 1933, the six-story structure was designed in the Art Deco style by Raymond Hood, Rockefeller Center's lead architect. La Maison Francaise, along with the nearly identical British Empire Building and the high-rise International Building to the north, comprise a group of retail-and-office structures known as the International Complex. La Maison Francaise and the British Empire Building are separated by Channel Gardens, a planted pedestrian esplanade running west to the complex's Lower Plaza.

The facade is made of limestone, with a main entrance along Fifth Avenue and secondary entrances on 49th Street and Channel Gardens. The top of La Maison Francaise contains setbacks, a rooftop garden, and a partial seventh-story penthouse. The building's entrances contain ornate decorations by Lee Lawrie, Alfred Janniot, and Rene Paul Chambellan. The entire Rockefeller Center complex is a New York City designated landmark and a National Historic Landmark.

La Maison Francaise and the British Empire Building were developed as part of the construction of Rockefeller Center after a proposal for a single building on the site was scrapped. Work began in February 1932 and French companies agreed to occupy the building the next month. The building was completed in 1933 and initially mainly hosted French companies. Over the years, the building has contained a variety of tenants, including stores and travel companies.

== Site ==
Buildings of Rockefeller Center
Buildings and structures in Rockefeller Center:
1 1 Rockefeller Plaza
2 10 Rockefeller Plaza
3 La Maison Francaise
4 British Empire Building
5 30 Rockefeller Plaza
6 International Building
7 50 Rockefeller Plaza
8 1230 Avenue of the Americas
9 Radio City Music Hall
10 1270 Avenue of the Americas
11 75 Rockefeller Plaza
12 600 Fifth Avenue
13 608 Fifth Avenue
14 1271 Avenue of the Americas
15 1251 Avenue of the Americas
16 1221 Avenue of the Americas
17 1211 Avenue of the Americas

La Maison Francaise is part of the Rockefeller Center complex in the Midtown Manhattan neighborhood of New York City. Located at 610 Fifth Avenue, it is part of Rockefeller Center's International Complex. La Maison Francaise's architectural twin the British Empire Building is directly to the north, and the International Building is one block north. The rectangular land lot is shared with the British Empire Building and is bounded by Rockefeller Plaza to the west, 50th Street to the north, Fifth Avenue to the east, and 49th Street to the south. It covers 63,261 square feet (5,877.1 m^{2}) and has a frontage of 200.83 ft (61 m) on Fifth Avenue and 315 ft (96 m) on the streets.

The Channel Gardens, a 60-foot-wide (18 m), 200-foot-long (61 m) planted pedestrian esplanade, separates the British Empire Building and La Maison Francaise. It is named after the English Channel, the waterway separating Britain and France. The plaza slopes down toward the Lower Plaza to the west. The Lower Plaza is a below-grade courtyard containing Paul Manship's Prometheus sculpture and aseasonal ice rink. Architectural critic Paul Goldberger of The New York Times described the British Empire Building, Channel Gardens, and La Maison Francaise as "leading to a central focus", namely the Lower Plaza.

La Maison Francaise is in the eastern section of the Rockefeller Center complex. Within Rockefeller Center, the building faces 1 Rockefeller Plaza to the south, 10 Rockefeller Plaza to the southwest, 30 Rockefeller Plaza to the west, 50 Rockefeller Plaza to the northwest, and the British Empire Building and International Building to the north. The building is also near St. Patrick's Cathedral to the northeast, the Saks Fifth Avenue flagship store (including 623 Fifth Avenue) to the east, 597 Fifth Avenue to the southeast, and 608 Fifth Avenue and 600 Fifth Avenue to the south. The site was previously part of the campus of Columbia University, which retained ownership of most of the land well after the complex was built.

== Architecture ==
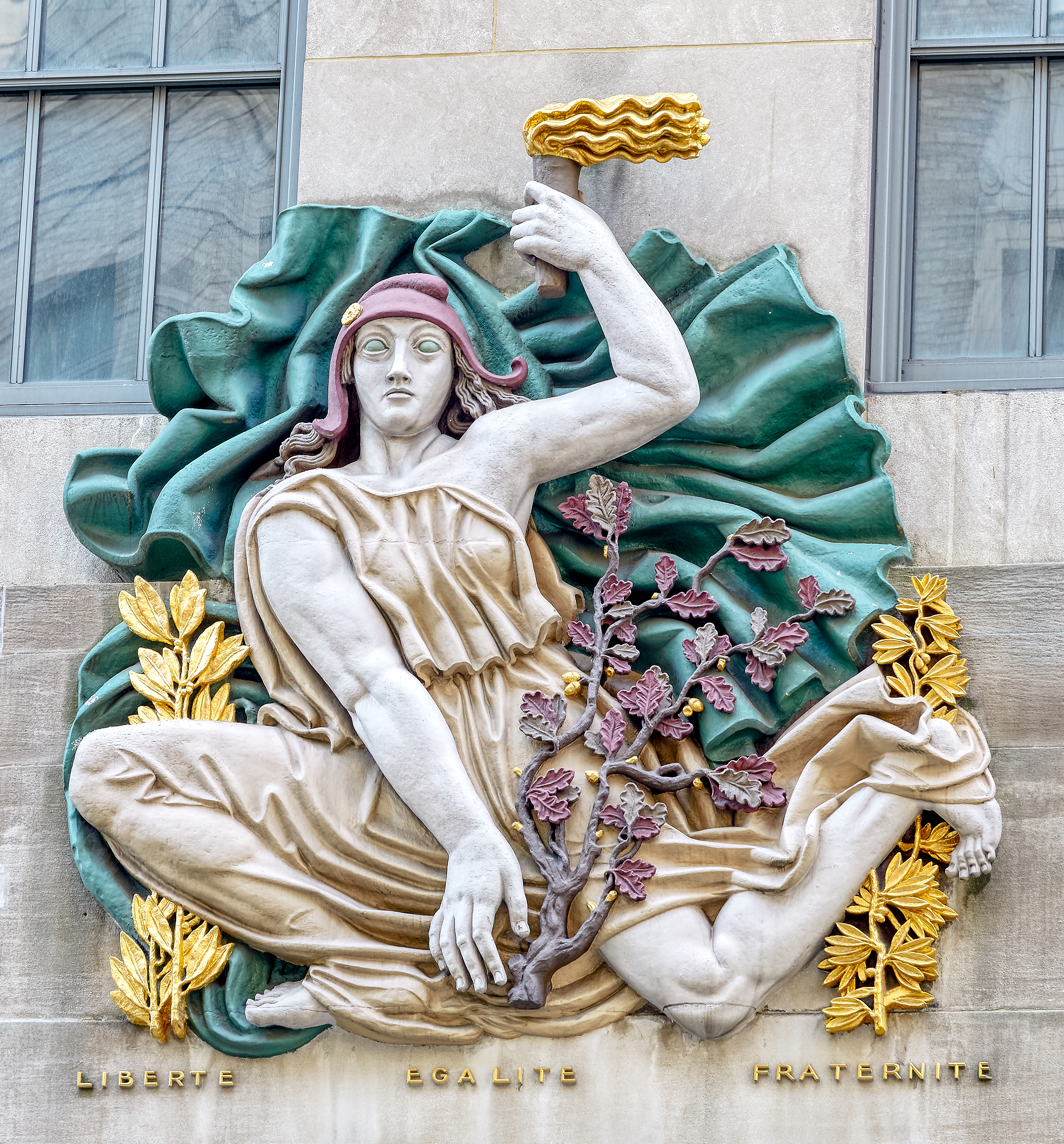
Janniot cartouche

La Maison Francaise is a six-story limestone building, with setbacks to the north and south above the fifth story. The building was designed by the Associated Architects of Rockefeller Center, composed of the firms of Corbett, Harrison & MacMurray; Hood, Godley & Fouilhoux; and Reinhard & Hofmeister. The Associated Architects designed all of Rockefeller Center's buildings in the Art Deco style.

According to The New York Times, La Maison Francaise measures 90 feet (27 m) tall to the top of its sixth story. The edifice measures 70 feet (21 m) on Fifth Avenue and 200 feet (61 m) on 50th Street. There is a 1 1/2-story penthouse above the west half of the sixth story and a roof garden above the eastern half of the sixth story. The seventh-story penthouse gives the building a more imposing massing along the Lower Plaza than along Fifth Avenue. The masses of the British Empire Building and La Maison Francaise complement that of 623 Fifth Avenue to the east and 30 Rockefeller Plaza to the west.

=== Facade ===
The entire facade is made of limestone. The ground floor of La Maison Francaise includes storefronts and display windows on all four elevations. The building's storefronts were originally assigned address numbers 610A to 610G on Fifth Avenue. La Maison Francaise contains a cornerstone at its northeast corner, with inscriptions. Above the ground floor is a cornice with a bead and reel molding. The second through seventh floors have steel sash windows with slightly recessed limestone spandrels between the windows on each story. The windows are separated by flat vertical piers with ribbon moldings at their capitals. Three flagpoles hang from the piers on Fifth Avenue. The setbacks are also topped by ribbon moldings. There are also cornices above the setbacks, which were intended to draw viewers' attention toward 30 Rockefeller Plaza.

Hartley Burr Alexander, a mythology and symbology professor who oversaw Rockefeller Center's art program, led the installation of artwork throughout the complex. Rockefeller Center's international complex was decorated to an international theme, with motifs representing the arts, peace, and commerce. La Maison Francaise's artwork was themed to French art, industry, and trade. The decorations were mostly designed by French artists.

==== Fifth Avenue ====
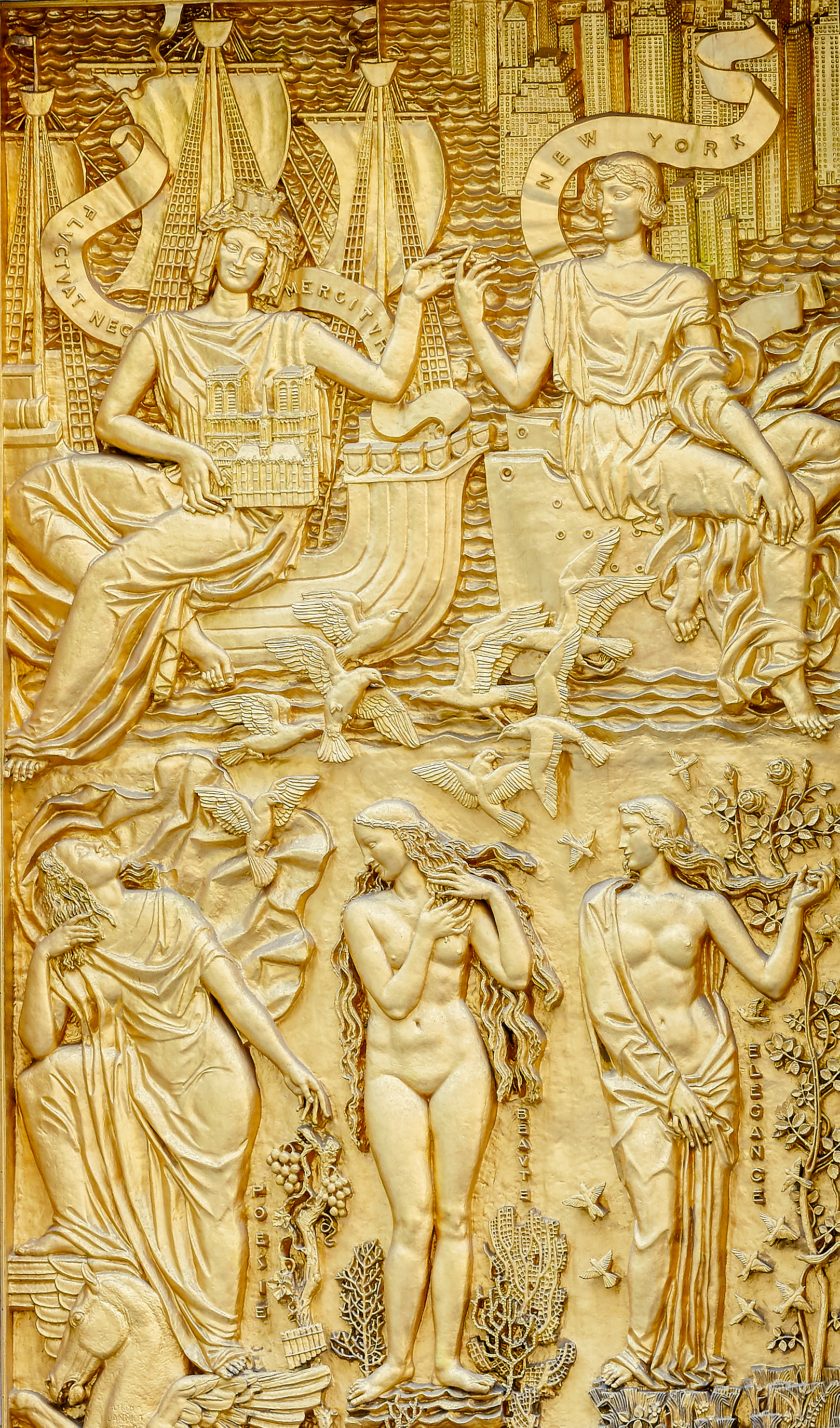
Janniot gilded bronze engraving

Alfred Janniot's 10-short-ton (8.9-long-ton) gilded bronze engraving above the entrance measures 11 feet (3.4 m) wide by 18 feet (5.5 m) tall. It contains personifications of France and New York holding hands above the ocean. The personification of France holds the Notre Dame on her lap and the scroll unfurling behind is inscribed with the Latin motto of Paris: "fluctuat nec mergitur" (it floats, but never sinks). The personification of New York sits in front of an unfurling scroll with the state's name, as well as a carving of Rockefeller Center's skyscrapers. Below are three female personifications of poetry, beauty, and elegance in varying states of dress. The engraving also contains birds, plants, and fruits.

Above this bronze engraving, Janniot also sculpted a cartouche of a female personification of French freedom, with the French motto "liberté, egalité, fraternité" (liberty, equality, fraternity) inscribed below. The figure measures 10 feet (3.0 m) tall and about 11 feet (3.4 m) wide. The woman is depicted in a twisted position amid a green background. Her left hand holds a torch of freedom aloft, while her right hand points downward, holding olive branches and laurel wreaths. The figure's left breast is barely covered, which was meant to symbolize danger, while her pose was intended to signify triumph.

Rene Chambellan created four bas-reliefs above the sixth-story windows. They symbolize historical eras of France: Charlemagne's Empire, New France, Louis XIV's Absolute Monarchy, and the French Republic from left to right. The Charlemagne's Empire panel contains a large sword and the initials SPQR, while the New France panel has fleurs-de-lis around five spears. The Louis XIV panel shows a scepter, a pair of fleurs-de-lis, and a torch intersected by a banner with the inscription "L'etat, c'est moi" (I am the state). The French Republic panel contains the letters "R F", a Phrygian cap, fasces, a laurel crown, and three bands with the French motto. Early plans called for the Fifth Avenue elevation to be capped by a limestone frieze and statues, but these were greatly simplified in the final plans.

==== Other elevations ====
The west elevation rises seven stories and includes display windows, but no doors, at ground level. West of the building, stairs descend from the sidewalk to the Lower Plaza. As a result, the west elevation's right display window is smaller than the other display windows on that elevation. The west elevation does not itself set back, but the fifth- and seventh-story setbacks of the north and south elevations are visible. The west elevation is divided by four piers, each with a bronze hood for illumination. The rightmost pier contains a small inscription with the text "Rockefeller Center".

The north and south elevations are similar to each other and include ground-level storefronts and display windows. On the ground story of both elevations, there are four storefronts or display windows on either side of a secondary entrance. Lee Lawrie decorated the spaces above the secondary entrances. The entrances themselves are recessed and include revolving doors. The western eight bays of each elevation rise to the seventh story, with limestone lattice spandrels and an additional setback above six of these bays. There is a cornerstone with an inscription at the northeast corner of the building.

The southern entrance at 9 West 49th Street is simple in design. It contains three gilded fleurs-de-lis, which are carved into the limestone block above the entrance. Beneath the fleurs-de-lis is a lintel with scalloped gray-green panels and rectangular golden dentils. The northern entrance on Channel Gardens is topped by Seeds of Good Citizenship, a gilded carving of a woman wearing a Phrygian cap and throwing seeds. Beneath the carving is a multicolored lintel. From top to bottom, there are scalloped bands in gold and green hues, a band of red chevrons, and a set of black triangles. Léon-Victor Solon helped create the carvings, which were made in intaglio.

=== Features ===
The British Empire Building and La Maison Francaise together contain only 173,000 square feet (16,100 m^{2}) of floor area, even though their site can theoretically accommodate a 912,800-square-foot (84,800 m^{2}) building. When the building was completed, it had a gross floor area of 54,000 square feet (5,000 m^{2}) across six stories and two basements. The building's lobby contains a model airplane created by Cartier & Co. The plane, installed in 1933, signifies the transatlantic flight that Dieudonné Costes and Maurice Bellonte made from France to New York in 1930. The basement connects to other buildings at Rockefeller Center, including 30 Rockefeller Plaza, the International Building, and the British Empire Building.

The superstructure is made of skeletal steel and weighs 1,700 short tons (1,500 long tons; 1,500 t). The building's steel structure was strengthened to support the weight of the rooftop garden, which is planted with flowers and hedges. C. J. Hughes of The New York Times described the roof gardens in 2019 as "jewels that have broken loose from a necklace and landed on a dusty floor".

== History ==
The construction of Rockefeller Center occurred between 1932 and 1940 (Note: 30 Rockefeller Plaza was the first building to start construction, in September 1932. The last building was completed in 1940.) on land that John D. Rockefeller Jr. leased from Columbia University. The Rockefeller Center site was originally supposed to be occupied by a new opera house for the Metropolitan Opera. By 1928, Benjamin Wistar Morris and designer Joseph Urban were hired to come up with blueprints for the house. However, the new building was too expensive for the opera to fund by itself, and it needed an endowment. The project ultimately gained Rockefeller's support. The planned opera house was canceled in December 1929 due to various issues, and Rockefeller quickly negotiated with Radio Corporation of America (RCA) and its subsidiaries, National Broadcasting Company (NBC) and Radio-Keith-Orpheum (RKO), to build a mass media entertainment complex on the site. By May 1930, RCA and its affiliates had agreed to develop the site.

=== Development ===
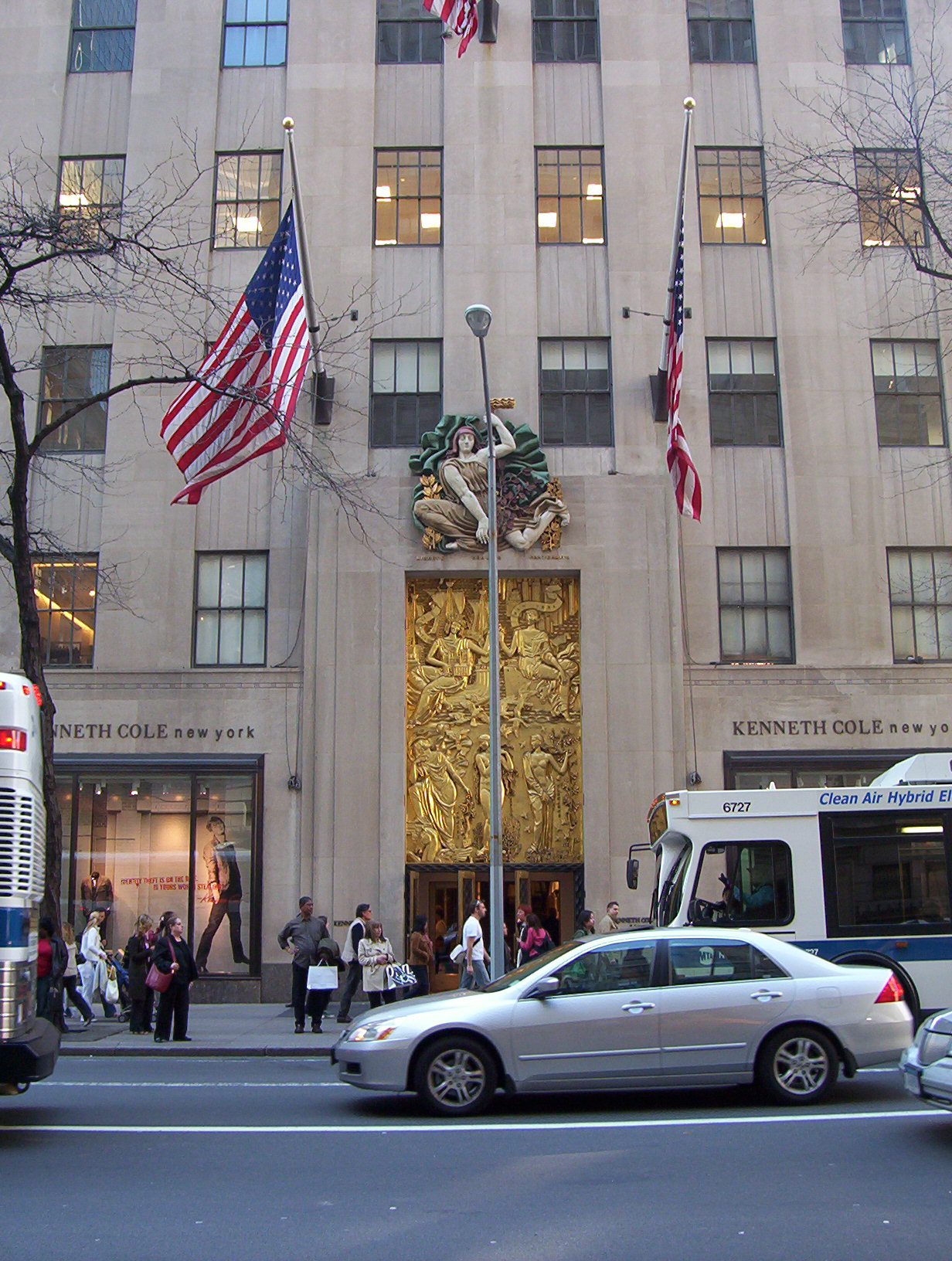
Fifth Avenue facade

One proposal for Rockefeller Center, revealed in March 1930, included an oval retail building on Fifth Avenue between 49th and 50th Streets, whose top floors would contain Chase National Bank offices. A refined proposal, announced in March 1931, called for a rooftop garden atop the oval building. The public criticized the revised plan and saw the oval building in particular as clashing with other designs on Fifth Avenue. The oval building was scrapped in early 1931 after Chase withdrew from the project. It was replaced by a pair of six-story retail buildings between 49th and 50th Streets, as well as a 41-story tower on the block to the north. Because the canceled oval building had contained rooftop gardens, Raymond Hood suggested the idea for rooftop gardens across the complex, including on all of the retail buildings. These gardens would be curated by Ralph Hancock.

As American tenants were reluctant to rent in these retail buildings, Rockefeller Center manager Hugh Robertson, formerly of Todd, Robertson and Todd, suggested foreign tenants for the buildings. The complex's managers promoted Rockefeller Center as a "hub for international trade". Rockefeller Center's managers held talks with prospective Czech, German, Italian, and Swedish lessees who could potentially occupy the six-story internationally themed buildings on Fifth Avenue. Dutch, Chinese, Japanese, and Russian tenants were also reportedly considered. The British government had agreed to occupy the British Empire Building in January 1932, making it the first themed building for which an agreement was made. The second themed building was La Maison Francaise, which French tenants agreed to occupy in March 1932. Unlike for the British building, for which the British government was a tenant, the French government was not originally planned to be a tenant. Like the British building, La Maison Francaise was to be a free port, with all of its merchandise being exempted from tariffs. The seventh-story penthouse above the building was added late in the design process.

Excavation for the sites of the British Empire Building and La Maison Francaise began in February 1932. Within two months, more than 28,000 cubic yards (21,000 m^{3}) of dirt had been excavated. Work on the buildings temporarily stopped in May 1932 because of a labor strike. Though the British building's steel frame was completed by November 1932, work on the French building's superstructure had not begun. By early April 1933, the building's steel superstructure was being erected. Former French prime minister Edouard Herriot dedicated La Maison Francaise on April 29, 1933. France's economy was relatively stable at the time of the building's completion, but Herriot praised the Rockefeller Center building as embodying "prosperity, freedom and peace of the world". In June 1933, the New York Building Congress hosted a ceremony on the first floor, giving craftsmanship awards to 22 workers who were involved in the project. Janniot was commissioned the next month to sculpt the cartouche above the main entrance. In addition, 350 workers were hired for the construction of the superstructure.

=== 1930s to 1970s ===
The French government had expressed interest in occupying space at La Maison Francaise shortly after the building plans were announced, and a tourist bureau opened in October 1933. Other early tenants included wine distributor G. H. Mumm, perfume store Les Parfums Marley, steamship line Compagnie Générale Transatlantique, designer Anny Blatt, and newspaper Courrier des États-Unis. Janniot's sculpture was unveiled in June 1934; The New York Times described it as "a new Statue of Liberty on Fifth Avenue". By the beginning of 1935, La Maison Francaise was 82 percent occupied. La Maison Francaise also hosted exhibitions in its early years, including an exhibit on urban basements, a display of Napoleon artifacts, and an amateur photography show. Other tenants in the late 1930s included Air France, Cafe Louis XIV, a French information bureau, Eastern Steamship Lines, and a buying office of the French embassy.

The French consulate in the building only operated until 1942 (under Vichy France), when the consular office bought a building further north on Fifth Avenue. Also during the 1940s, jewelry firm J. Chaumet Inc. and perfume store Coty Inc. leased space in La Maison Francaise. Even during World War II, in 1944, the building was recorded as being fully occupied. After the war, the building hosted a United Nations committee to identify sites for a new United Nations headquarters. After World War II, Rockefeller Center sought to add air conditioning to its original structures, as this feature was already in place in newer buildings. The British Empire Building and La Maison Francaise already had cooling systems, which were upgraded. Columbia University was tasked with installing air conditioning in the buildings. The onset of the Korean War in 1950 delayed the project but, by the next year, Columbia had acquiesced to reimbursing Rockefeller Center Inc. for the installation.

Further leases were signed in the 1950s with importers Corroyer & Co., Israeli airline El Al, French advertising company Publicis, and the Mohawk Brush Company. During the next decade, the building's tenants included technology firm Raytheon Company, film producers WSK Associates, and a South African travel office. The bookstore Librairie de France also had an outlet in La Maison Francaise; it was one of several bookstores on Fifth Avenue in midtown. During the 1970s, womenswear store Pierre D'Alby replaced the French National Tourist Bureau offices at ground level, while accessories retailer Botticelli replaced an airline office. The building was also upgraded in the early 1980s to comply with more stringent fire-safety regulations.

=== 1980s and 1990s ===
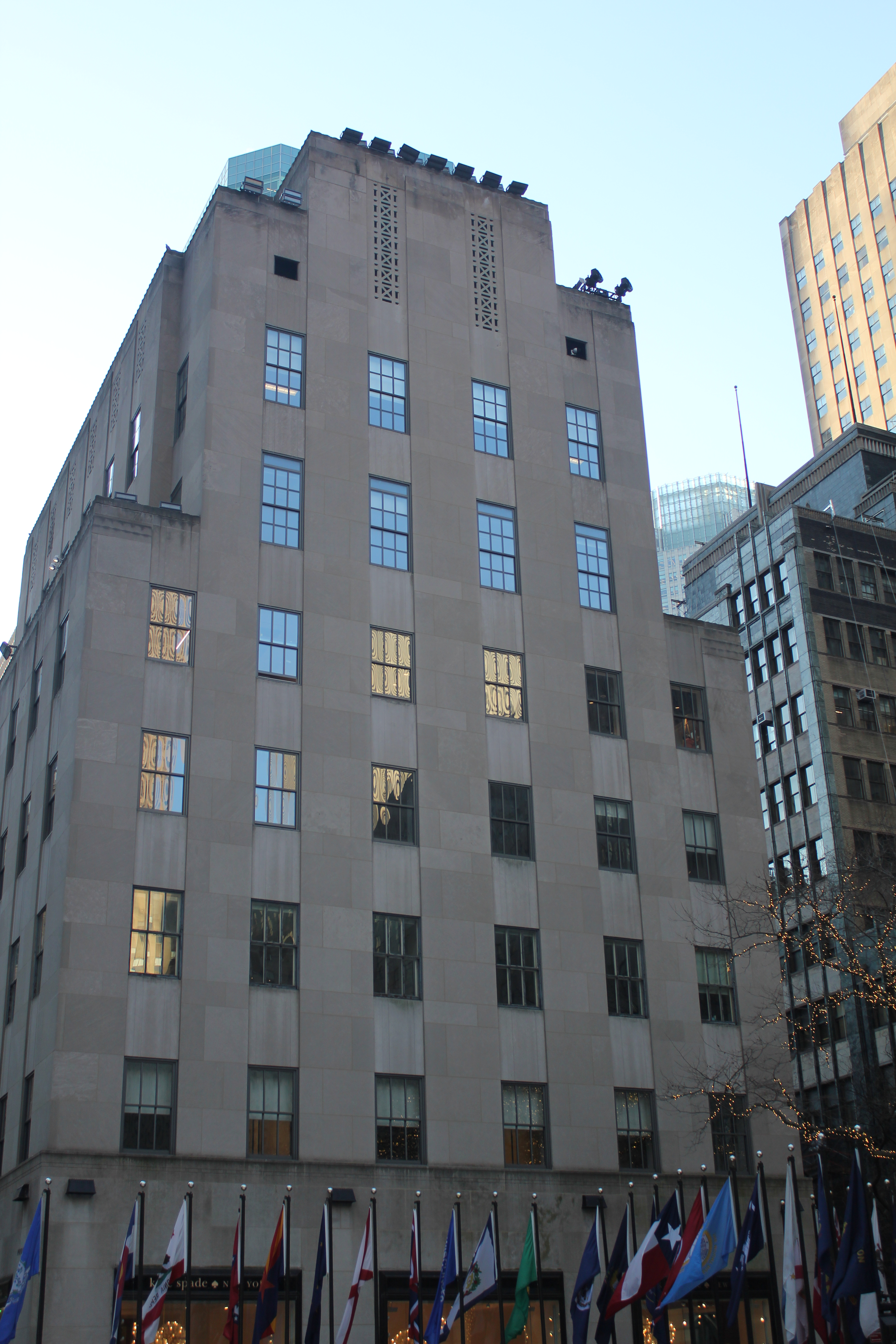
View of the building's Lower Plaza elevation

Columbia University was not making enough money from Rockefeller Center leases by the 1970s, and the university started looking to sell the land beneath Rockefeller Center, including the International Building, in 1983. That year, the New York City Landmarks Preservation Commission (LPC) held hearings to determine how much of Rockefeller Center should be protected as a landmark. The Rockefeller family and Columbia University acknowledged that the buildings were already symbolically landmarks, but their spokesman John E. Zuccotti recommended that only the block between 49th and 50th Streets be protected, including La Maison Francaise. (Note: Namely 1250 Avenue of the Americas, 30 Rockefeller Plaza, the British Empire Building, La Maison Francaise, the Channel Gardens, and the Lower Plaza) By contrast, almost everyone else who supported Rockefeller Center's landmark status recommended that the entire complex be landmarked. The LPC granted landmark status to the exteriors of all of the original complex's buildings, as well as the interiors of two lobbies, on April 23, 1985. (Note: The final landmark designation covers 12 buildings as well as the Channel Gardens, Rockefeller Plaza, and Lower Plaza. These are 1230, 1250, and 1270 Avenue of the Americas; 1, 10, 30, 50, and 75 Rockefeller Plaza; the British Empire Building; the International Building; La Maison Francaise; and Radio City Music Hall. The lobbies of the International Building and 30 Rockefeller Plaza were also protected.) Rockefeller Center's original buildings also became a National Historic Landmark in 1987.

Meanwhile, Columbia had agreed to sell the land to the Rockefeller Group for $400 million in February 1985. The Rockefeller Group formed Rockefeller Center Inc. that July to manage La Maison Francaise and other properties. The Hudson-Shatz Painting Company also restored Janniot's cartouche and bronze panel above La Maison Francaise's entrance in 1985, coating these with a 23-karat layer of gold. During 1987, the roof gardens were restored at a cost of $48,000 for each garden. Mitsubishi Estate, a real estate company of the Mitsubishi Group, purchased a majority stake in the Rockefeller Group in 1988, including La Maison Francaise and Rockefeller Center's other structures. Subsequently, Rockefeller Center transferred some of the unused air rights above the British Empire Building and La Maison Francaise to the Rockefeller Plaza West skyscraper on Seventh Avenue. In exchange, the Rockefeller Group had to preserve the original buildings between 49th and 50th Streets under a more stringent set of regulations than the rest of the complex.

The Rockefeller Group filed for bankruptcy protection in May 1995 after missing several mortgage payments. That November, John Rockefeller Jr.'s son David and a consortium led by Goldman Sachs agreed to buy Rockefeller Center's buildings for $1.1 billion, beating out Sam Zell and other bidders. The transaction included $306 million for the mortgage and $845 million for other expenses. In the late 1990s, French boutique Rodier moved into one of the building's retail spaces. A preservation dispute arose in May 1998, when the owners announced plans to enlarge shop windows on the center's Fifth Avenue buildings to two stories. The window sizes were reduced upon the LPC's request, and the modifications were approved in September 1998.

=== 2000s to present ===
Tishman Speyer, led by David Rockefeller's close friend Jerry Speyer and the Lester Crown family of Chicago, bought the original 14 buildings and land in December 2000 for $1.85 billion, including La Maison Francaise. A Kenneth Cole clothing store opened in the building in the early 2000s; it was replaced in 2012 by a Michael Kors clothing store. The building's Librarie de France bookstore closed in 2009, after three-quarters of a century, due to rapidly increasing rent. In January 2020, Tishman Speyer hired Gabellini Sheppard Associates to design a renovation for Channel Gardens, Rockefeller Plaza, and the Lower Plaza. These plans included modifications to lighting, planting, pathways, and facades, such as the storefronts of La Maison Francaise and the British Empire Building. The plans were approved that April.
