= Librairie de France =

Bookstore in New York City, United States

Coordinates: 40°45′30″N 73°58′40″W

Librairie de France was a famous French bookstore at Rockefeller Center in New York City.

The store, located at 610 Fifth Avenue on Rockefeller Center Promenade, was opened in 1935 by Isaac Molho, though the company itself was founded in 1928. Molho had studied in Athens at a French school and come to the United States in 1928, but before leaving Europe, become acquainted with officials from Paris' Hachette publisher. The Rockefeller family were eager for some retail space in the new center to be filled by Europeans, and invited Molho to open shop as one of its first tenants.

The store closed on September 30, 2009, as a result of a spike in its annual rent from $360,000 to $1,000,000. The store continues to operate as a mail-order outlet.
