= International Building (Rockefeller Center) =

Office skyscraper in Manhattan, New York

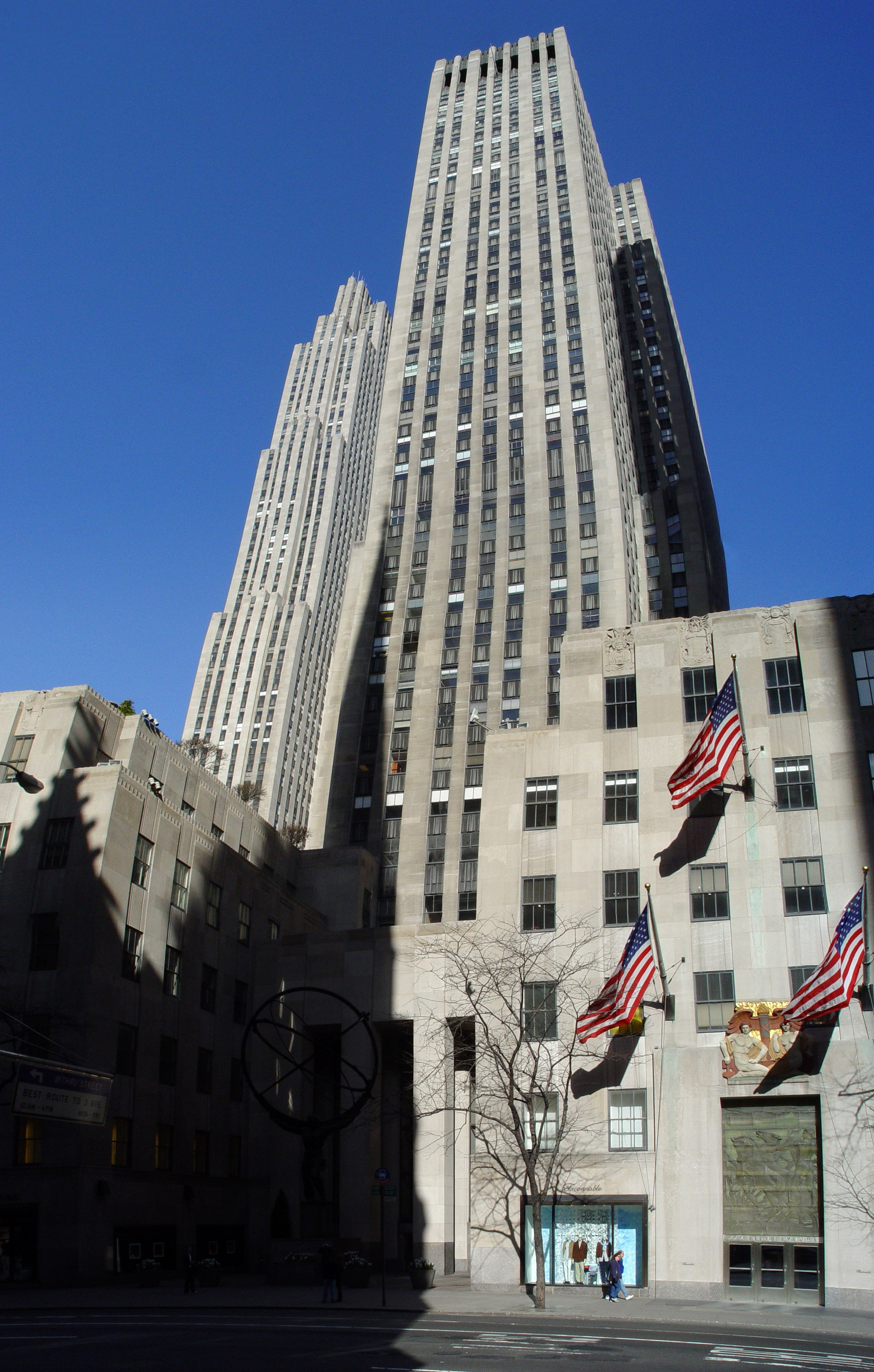
- Viewed from Fifth Avenue

General information
- Type: Office building
- Location: 626–636 Fifth Avenue; Manhattan, New York 10112, United States
- Coordinates: 40°45′33″N 73°58′40″W
- Completed: May 1, 1935
- Owner: Tishman Speyer

Height
- Roof: 512 ft (156 m)

Technical details
- Floor count: 41
- Floor area: 1,148,369 sq ft (106,687.0 m^{2})

Design and construction
- Architect: Raymond Hood
- Developer: John D. Rockefeller Jr.
- International Building
- U.S. Historic district – Contributing property
- New York City Landmark
- Area: 22 acres (8.9 ha)
- Architect: Raymond Hood
- Architectural style: Modern, Art Deco
- Part of: Rockefeller Center (ID87002591)
- NYCL No.: 1446, 1449 (Note: New York City designated landmark no. 1446 applies to Rockefeller Center, and landmark no. 1449 applies to the International Building's first floor interior.)

Significant dates
- Added to NRHP: December 23, 1987
- Designated CP: December 23, 1987
- Designated NYCL: April 23, 1985

Buildings of Rockefeller Center
Buildings and structures in Rockefeller Center:
1 1 Rockefeller Plaza
2 10 Rockefeller Plaza
3 La Maison Francaise
4 British Empire Building
5 30 Rockefeller Plaza
6 International Building
7 50 Rockefeller Plaza
8 1230 Avenue of the Americas
9 Radio City Music Hall
10 1270 Avenue of the Americas
11 75 Rockefeller Plaza
12 600 Fifth Avenue
13 608 Fifth Avenue
14 1271 Avenue of the Americas
15 1251 Avenue of the Americas
16 1221 Avenue of the Americas
17 1211 Avenue of the Americas

The International Building, also known by its addresses 630 Fifth Avenue and 45 Rockefeller Plaza, is a skyscraper at Rockefeller Center in the Midtown Manhattan neighborhood of New York City. Completed in 1935, the 41-story, 512 ft (156 m) building was designed in the Art Deco style by Raymond Hood, Rockefeller Center's lead architect. The main tower is set back from Fifth Avenue and includes two 6-story wings to the east, known as Palazzo d'Italia and International Building North. The wings flank an entrance plaza that contains Lee Lawrie's Atlas statue.

The facade is made of limestone, with granite at the base. The wings, patterned around the British Empire Building and La Maison Francaise to the south, contain rooftop gardens. The building's entrances contain ornate decorations by numerous artists. The main entrance on Fifth Avenue leads to a four-story-tall lobby with large marble pillars and escalators. The office space is arranged around the elevator core, with all offices being within 27 ft (8.2 m) of a window. The entire Rockefeller Center complex is a New York City designated landmark and a National Historic Landmark, and the lobby is also a New York City landmark.

The International Building was developed as part of the construction of Rockefeller Center, although plans for the building were modified multiple times. A groundbreaking ceremony was hosted in July 1933, after Italian interests leased the southern wing, but Rockefeller Center's managers could not secure a commitment for a specific country in the northern wing. The building's superstructure was constructed in 136 days from September 1934 to May 1935. The Palazzo d'Italia was modified in the 1940s after the start of World War II, and further modifications were made in the late 20th century. Over the years, the International Building has contained a variety of tenants, including numerous foreign consulates.

== Site ==
The International Building is part of the Rockefeller Center complex in the Midtown Manhattan neighborhood of New York City. The building carries the addresses 630 Fifth Avenue to its east and 45 Rockefeller Plaza to its west. The rectangular land lot is shared with the buildings at 1260 Avenue of the Americas and 50 Rockefeller Plaza to the west. The lot is bounded by Sixth Avenue to the west, 51st Street to the north, Fifth Avenue to the east, and 50th Street to the south. It covers 184,764 ft^{2} (17,165.1 m^{2}) and has a frontage of 920 ft (280 m) on the streets and a frontage of 200 ft (61 m) on the avenues. The International Building and 1260 Avenue of the Americas are separated by Rockefeller Plaza, a private pedestrian street running through the complex. The building is assigned its own ZIP Code, 10111; it was one of 41 buildings in Manhattan that had their own ZIP Codes as of 2019.

The International Building is at the northeast corner of the Rockefeller Center complex. The building faces La Maison Francaise and the British Empire Building to the south; the two structures are architectural twins of the International Building's low-rise wings. Also within Rockefeller Center are 30 Rockefeller Plaza to the southwest and 1260 Avenue of the Americas, Radio City Music Hall, and 50 Rockefeller Plaza to the west. In addition, 75 Rockefeller Plaza, the Women's National Republican Club, and 650 Fifth Avenue are immediately to the north. The Cartier Building, 647 Fifth Avenue, and the Olympic Tower are diagonally across Fifth Avenue and 51st Street to the northwest. The building also faces St. Patrick's Cathedral to the east and the Saks Fifth Avenue flagship store (including 623 Fifth Avenue) to the southeast. The site was previously part of the campus of Columbia University, which retained ownership of most of the land well after the complex was built.

== Architecture ==
The International Building was designed by the Associated Architects of Rockefeller Center, composed of the firms of Corbett, Harrison & MacMurray; Hood, Godley & Fouilhoux; and Reinhard & Hofmeister. Raymond Hood was the complex's lead architect. The Associated Architects designed all of Rockefeller Center's buildings in the Art Deco style. Developed as part of the construction of Rockefeller Center, the International Building opened in 1935. The 512 ft (156 m) building is 41 stories high, including mechanical floors. One of two skyscrapers that opened in Manhattan in 1935, (Note: The other was the Thurgood Marshall United States Courthouse.) it was noted for its short 136-day duration of construction, as well as the construction quality, overall design, and materials used.

Hartley Burr Alexander, a mythology and symbology professor who oversaw Rockefeller Center's art program, led the installation of artwork throughout the complex. Rockefeller Center's international complex was decorated to an international theme, with motifs representing the arts, peace, and commerce.

=== Form ===
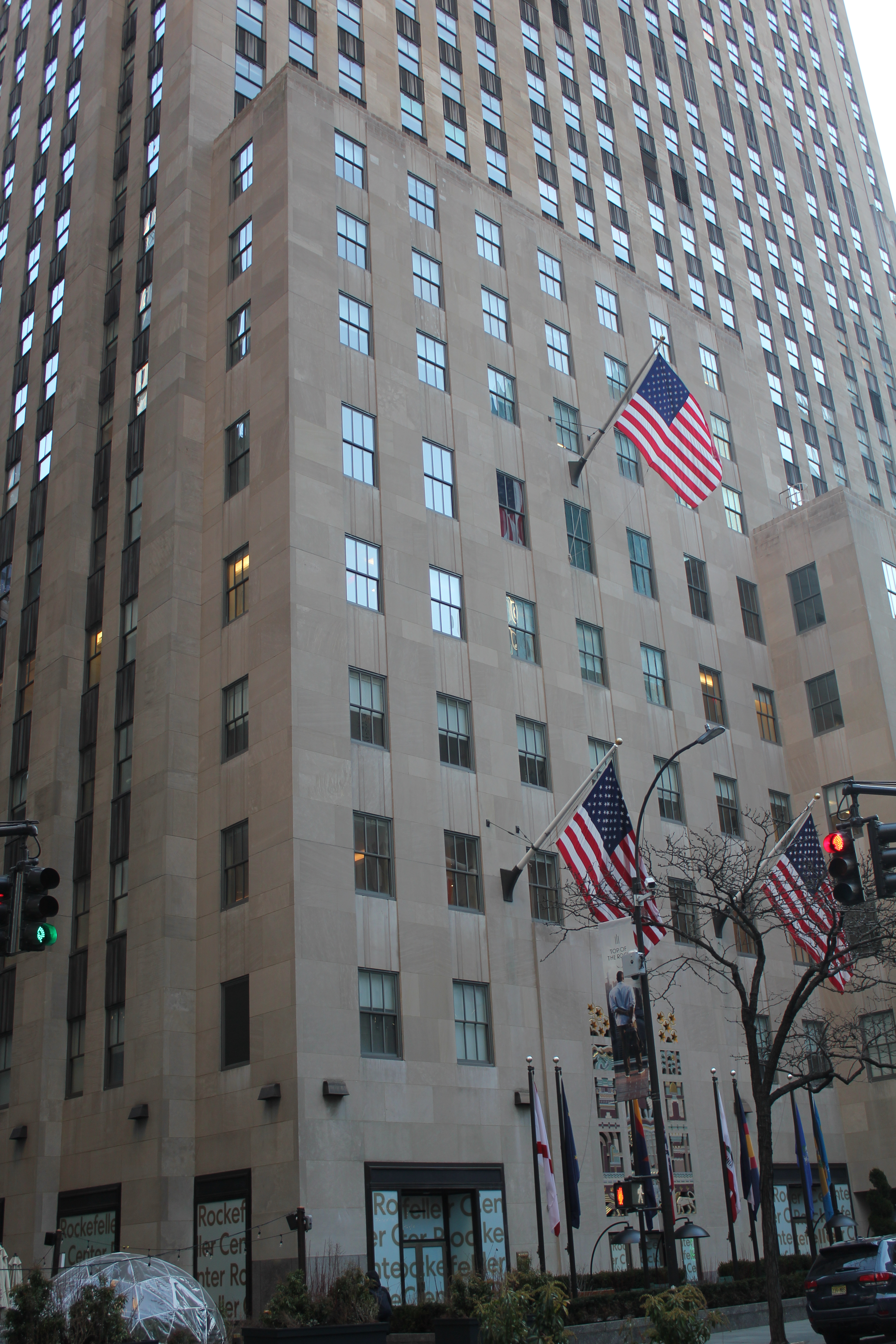
The International Building has several setbacks. Pictured is the western end of the south elevation, with a nine-story-tall mass in front of the main tower. At far right, a six-story wing continues east and becomes the Palazzo d'Italia.

The main portion of the International Building is its 41-story tower. The main tower was recessed as far back from Fifth Avenue as possible to maximize rental space while still complying with the 1916 Zoning Resolution, which mandated that buildings contain setbacks above a certain height. Aside from the four-story entrance on Fifth Avenue, the tower has no setbacks along its eastern elevation. The tower contains three setbacks on its north and south elevations, which are not visible from either Rockefeller Plaza or Fifth Avenue. The western ends of the north and south elevations contain nine-story-tall masses, which are visible from Rockefeller Plaza. The northwest corner contains a diagonal chamfer, while the southwest corner is slightly set back, creating a small plaza. The setbacks on the 50th and 51st Street elevations correspond to the tops of the elevator banks inside.

==== Wings ====
The tower is flanked by two six-story wings: Palazzo d'Italia and International Building North. At the sixth story, both wings contain setbacks to their north and south. The Palazzo d'Italia (literally the Italian Palace) is at 626 Fifth Avenue. The limestone-clad wing is attached to the main tower at its northwest corner. International Building North, at 636 Fifth Avenue, is identical to the Palazzo d'Italia and is attached to the main tower at its southwest corner. The northeast and southeast corners of the main tower are set back above the seventh story, running above both wings.

Both wings contain Mediterranean-themed rooftop gardens designed by A. M. van den Hoek, each measuring 229 by 52 ft (70 by 16 m). The gardens were initially grass lawns but subsequently replaced with ivy beds surrounded by curving hedges. The gardens are also decorated with terracotta planters, two stone plaques transported from the Roman Forum, and walkways with cobblestones from Italian roads. Two 6 ft-tall (1.8 m) statues by Paul Manship, depicting a young man and woman, stood above the Palazzo d'Italia from 1935 to 1984. The statues were sculpted in 1934 and originally complemented Manship's Prometheus sculpture to the south.

The wings surround a central entrance plaza to the east. The plaza is paved in gray and pink stone, arranged in geometric shapes. Lee Lawrie's 15 ft-tall (4.6 m), 14,000 lb (6,400 kg) bronze Atlas statue is at the center of the Fifth Avenue entrance plaza, placed on a 9 ft-high (2.7 m) pedestal. It depicts the ancient Greek Titan Atlas holding a 21 ft-wide (6.4 m) armillary sphere. The statue incorporates motifs such as zodiac signs and an axis aligned with the North Star. The pedestal is placed diagonally, with its eastern corner facing Fifth Avenue, and it is surrounded by granite benches.

=== Facade ===
The entire facade is made of limestone; the vertical piers and the reveals of the windows are very plain in design. When the building was developed, the Associated Architects gave the recessed main tower a one-story-tall entryway on Fifth Avenue, emphasizing the wings on either side. The wings' entrances on Fifth Avenue complement the main tower. The side entrances on 50th and 51st Streets contain limestone reliefs created by Lawrie. The exterior contains 9,600 short tons (8,600 long tons; 8,700 t) of limestone and 2,900 windows. In addition, the building uses 4.65 million bricks, weighing 8,360 short tons (7,460 long tons; 7,580 t).

==== Fifth Avenue ====
The building contains a central plaza on its east, facing the Fifth Avenue entrance. Behind the Atlas statue, the main slab contains a limestone loggia with four piers, between which are three doorways to the four-story-high lobby. Each opening contains a revolving door with a granite frame. Plate-glass windows rise above the doors, reflecting both the Atlas statue and St. Patrick's Cathedral across the street. Both wings originally included artworks by Attilio Piccirilli above their entrances, as well as decorations by Leo Lentelli. The south elevation of International Building North, as well as the north elevation of the Palazzo, also face the plaza. These elevations contain storefronts and display windows.

===== Palazzo d'Italia =====
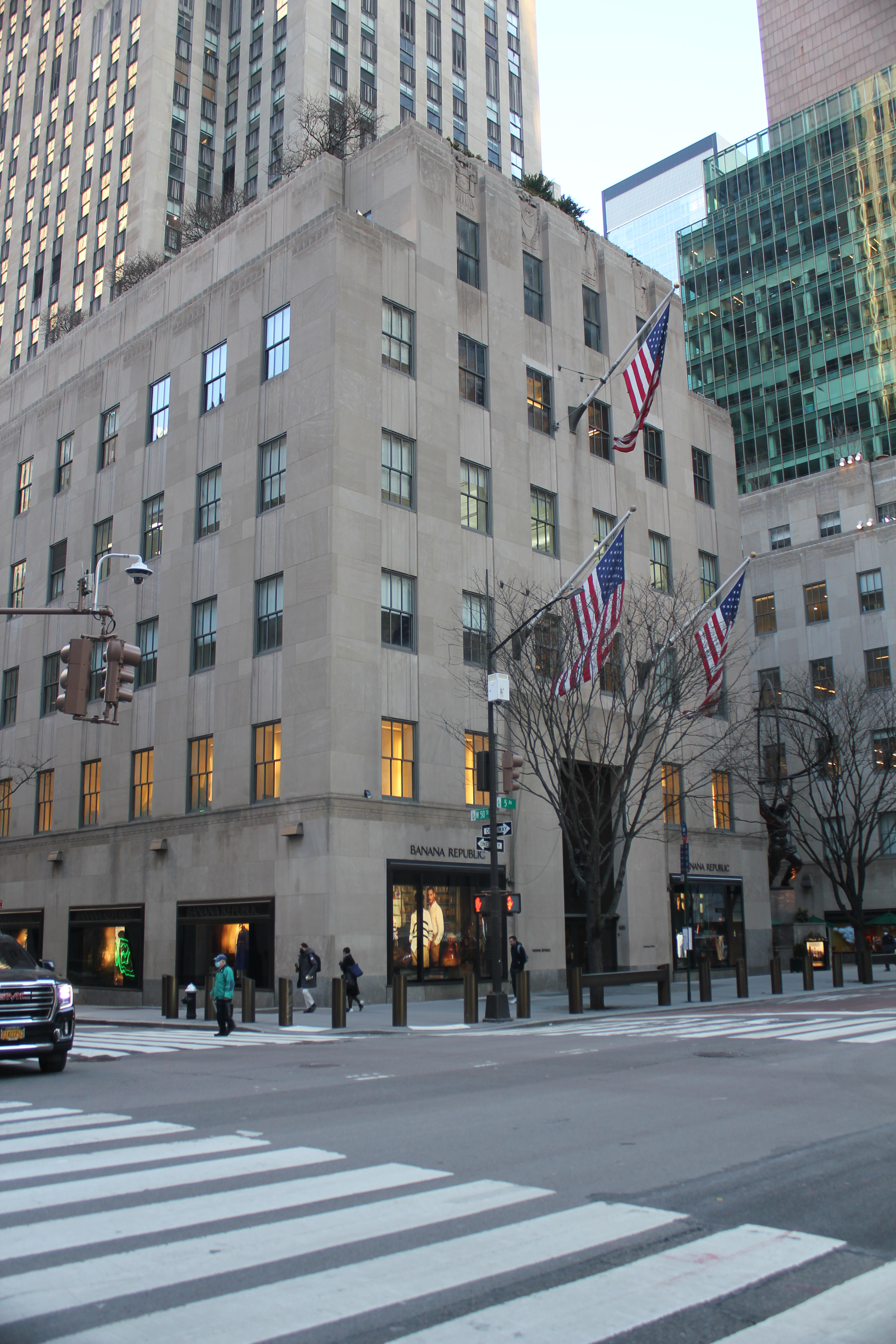
Palazzo d'Italia

The ground floor of the Palazzo includes storefronts and display windows, above which runs a cornice. The center of the Palazzo contains a main entrance with bronze doors. Above the doors and within the entrance, Piccirilli designed a 10 by 16 ft (3.0 by 4.9 m) glass panel, which depicted a man holding a spade with Italian inscriptions above and below. Corning Inc. manufactured the panel, which was built in 45 pieces. The works were covered in 1941 because they overtly celebrated fascism. In 1965, the original Piccirilli work above the entrance was replaced by Giacomo Manzù's bronze relief Italia, which depicts fruits below the word "Italia". The same year, Manzù created The Immigrant, a bas-relief depicting a penurious mother and child with their belongings, upon a background of sgraffito foliage. The Immigrant replaced the center door of the entryway, but it was reoriented in 2001 when the center door was re-added.

The entrance cartouche above the doorways originally depicted the Crown of Savoy and the Fasces, the latter an Italian fascist symbol depicting a bundle of rods bound together with an axe. The second through sixth floors have steel sash windows, with limestone spandrels between the windows on each story. The windows are separated by flat vertical piers with ribbon moldings at their capitals. Three flagpoles hang from the piers. Lentelli's limestone bas-reliefs above the sixth-story windows signify four periods of Italian history: Roman Empire, the Italian Renaissance, the unification of Italy, and Fascist Italy from left to right. The Roman Empire panel depicts a military uniform, crown, wreath, and the initials SPQR, while the Renaissance panel contains a shield, a lion's head, and the Roman numerals "MCCCC" (the year 1400). The unification panel depicts two flags and the words "Morteo/Liberata" (death/liberty). The Fascist panel depicts an eagle above fasces; the inscription "AXII" (representing the Fascists' March on Rome in 1922) was removed in 1949.

===== International Building North =====
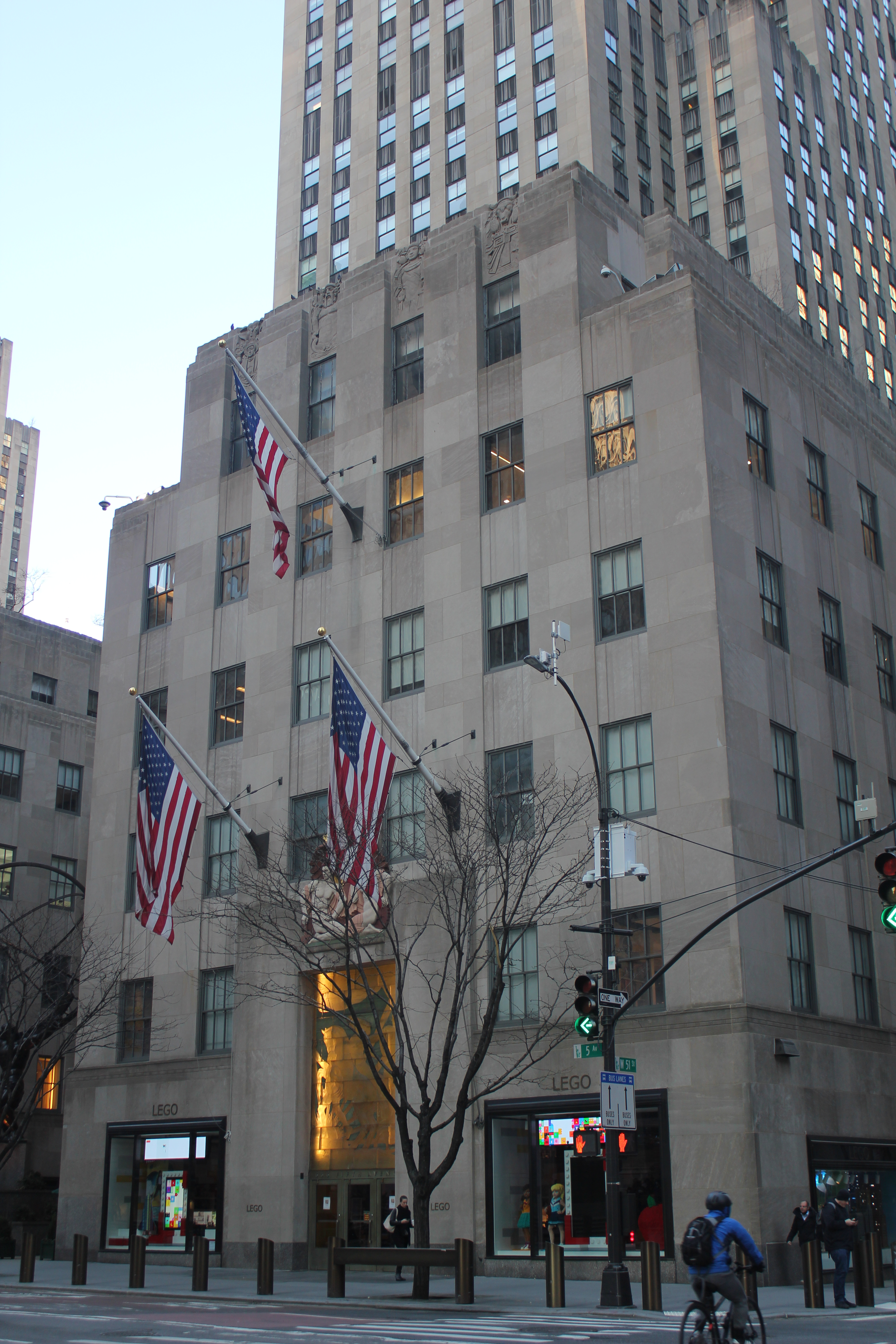
International Building North

The ground floor of International Building North also includes storefronts and display windows topped by a cornice. The center of International Building North contains a main entrance with three bronze doors. Because it was not originally built for a specific country, International Building North contains generic works related to international cooperation. Piccirilli designed an opaque "Poetic Glass" screen within the entryway above the doors, symbolizing a youth's involvement in world affairs. The glass panel, manufactured by Corning Inc. in 45 pieces, measures 10 by 16 ft (3.0 by 4.9 m) and is made of semi-opaque "poetic glass". Each glass piece was made with a unique mold, which was destroyed after the glass piece had been cast. The panel depicts a youth behind two rearing horses and a chariot driver, pointing to the left.

Piccirilli's cartouche above the entryway depicts a male and female holding brown tools. The figures are separated by a winged caduceus, representing the god Mercury, and are topped by gilded leaves. The cartouche was intended to signify international cooperation but instead had a fascist effect. The second through sixth floors are arranged similarly to those on the Palazzo's facade. Three flagpoles hang from the piers. Lentelli created four bas-reliefs above the sixth-story windows, which signify Asia, Europe, Africa, and the Americas from left to right. Asia's icon is a praying Buddha with an elephant head above, and Europe's icon is the god Neptune flanked by dolphins. Africa is represented by a figure in traditional garb, surrounded by fruits, while the Americas are represented by a buffalo head, corn cobs, and Mayan motifs. During World War II, both Piccirilli's and Lentelli's works for International Building North were retained.

==== 50th Street ====
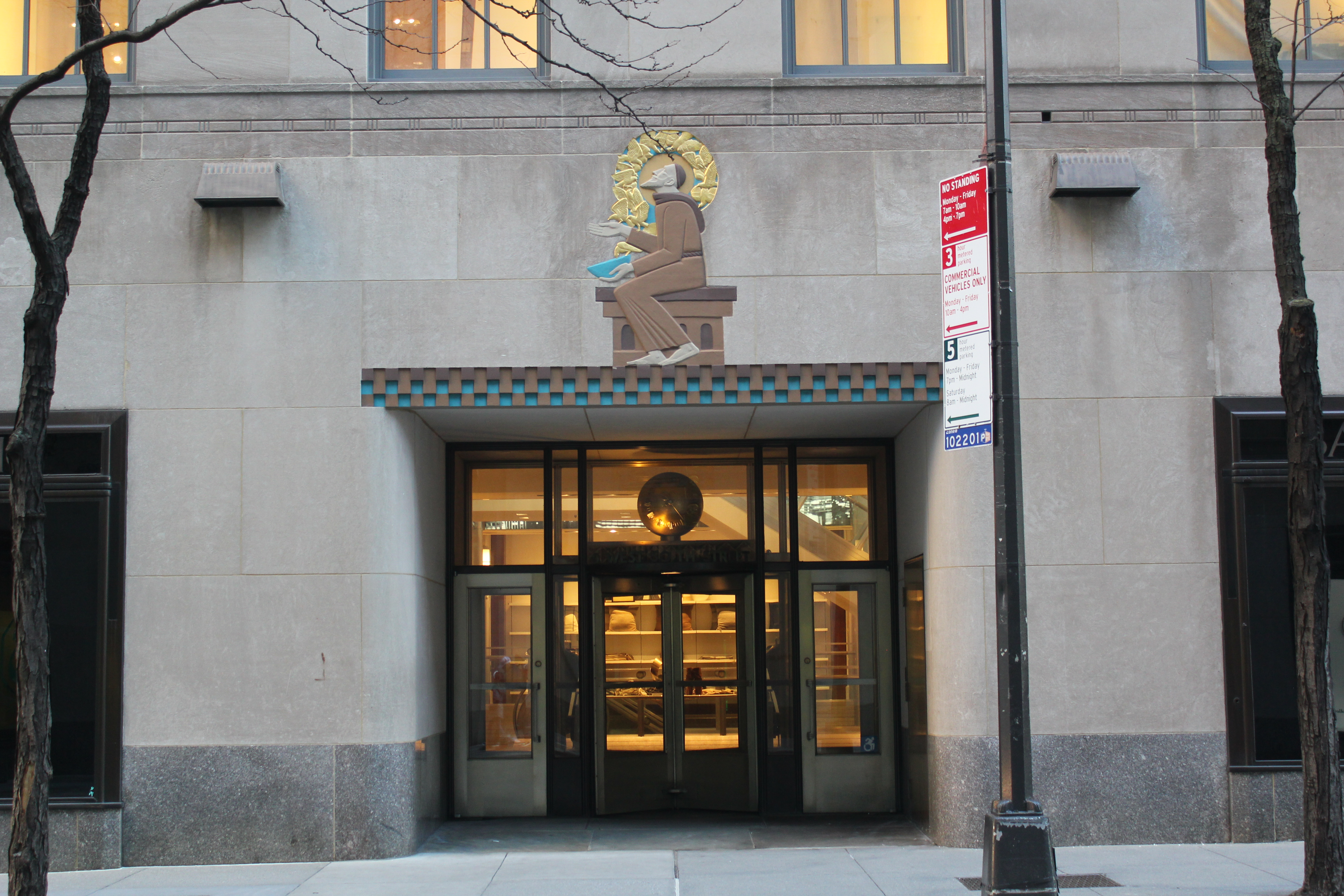
9 West 50th Street entrance

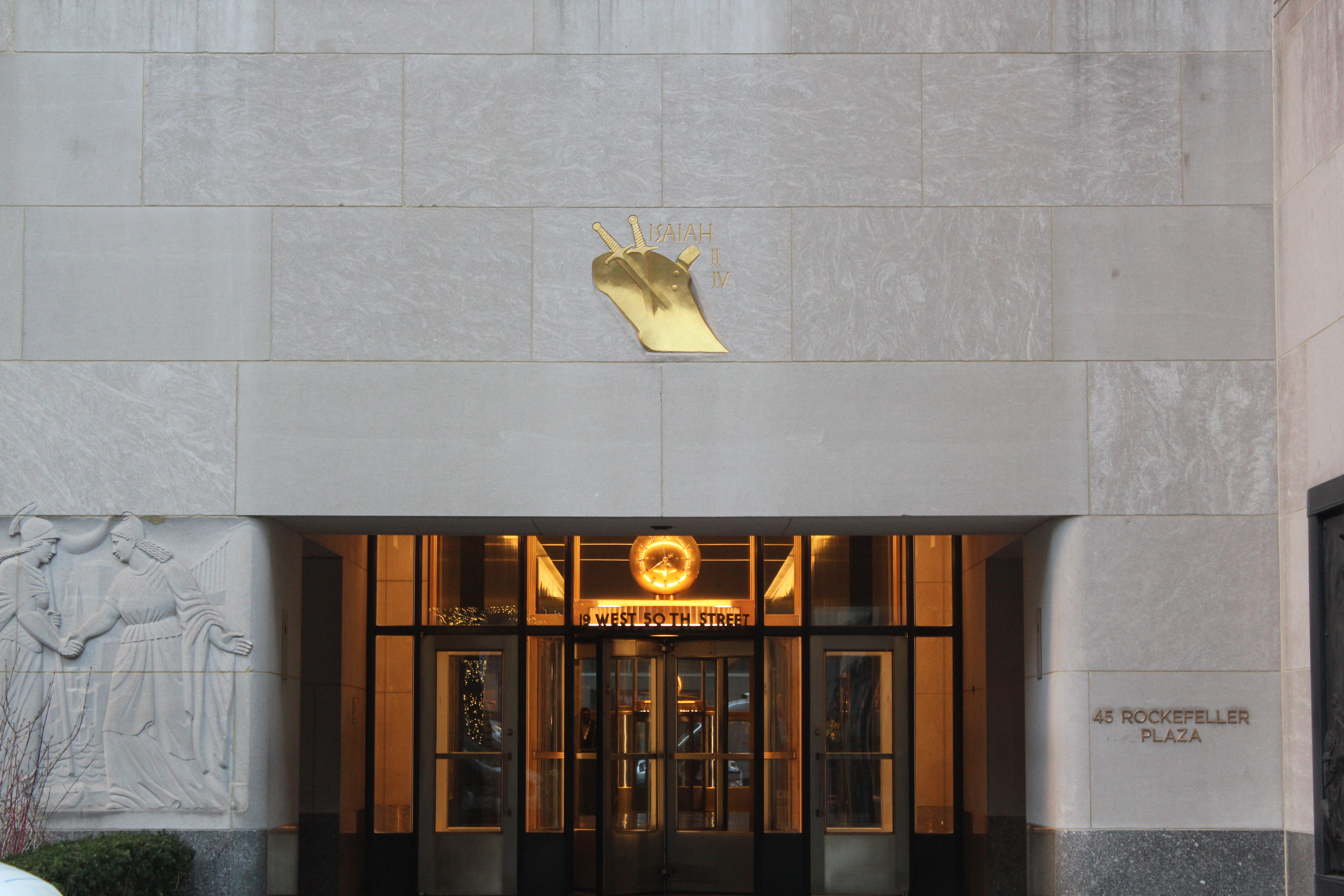
19 West 50th Street entrance

On 50th Street, there are several storefronts and display windows, interrupted by three entrances. A cornice runs above the first story there. For the 9 West 50th Street entrance (leading to the Palazzo d'Italia), Lawrie had created Saint Francis of Assisi with Birds, a bas-relief depicting Francis of Assisi. Francis is depicted wearing a brown robe, sitting on a brown bench, with a halo of golden birds around his head and more golden birds eating from a bowl in his hand. Below this artwork are horizontal brown and aqua strips, interrupted by light-brown dentils in a checkerboard pattern. This was the only original artwork on the Palazzo d'Italia's exterior that were not modified during World War II.

Further west along 50th Street is an entrance to the main tower at 19 West 50th Street. Above the doorway is a depiction of a gilded plowshare containing crossed swords. The letters "Isaiah II IV" are inscribed in gold leaf above the plowshare, referencing chapter 2, verse 4 of the Book of Isaiah. (Note: The text of Isaiah II:IV is "And he shall judge among the nations, and shall rebuke many people: and they shall beat their swords into plowshares, and their spears into pruninghooks: nation shall not lift up sword against nation, neither shall they learn war any more.") Lawrie intended for his inscription to advocate for world peace. Lawrie did not decorate the lintel above the doorway, in contrast to all of the building's other side-street entrances. To the left of the doorway is a freestanding limestone pier with two intaglio and bas-relief carvings by Lawrie. The south face of the pier depicts Columbia (symbolizing America), greeting an immigrant woman who has just alighted from a ship, with the Manhattan skyline in the background. The west face depicts a young man unfurling a ship's sail in New York Harbor. Recessed within the doorway is a circular bronze clock above stainless steel capital letters reading "19 West 50th Street".

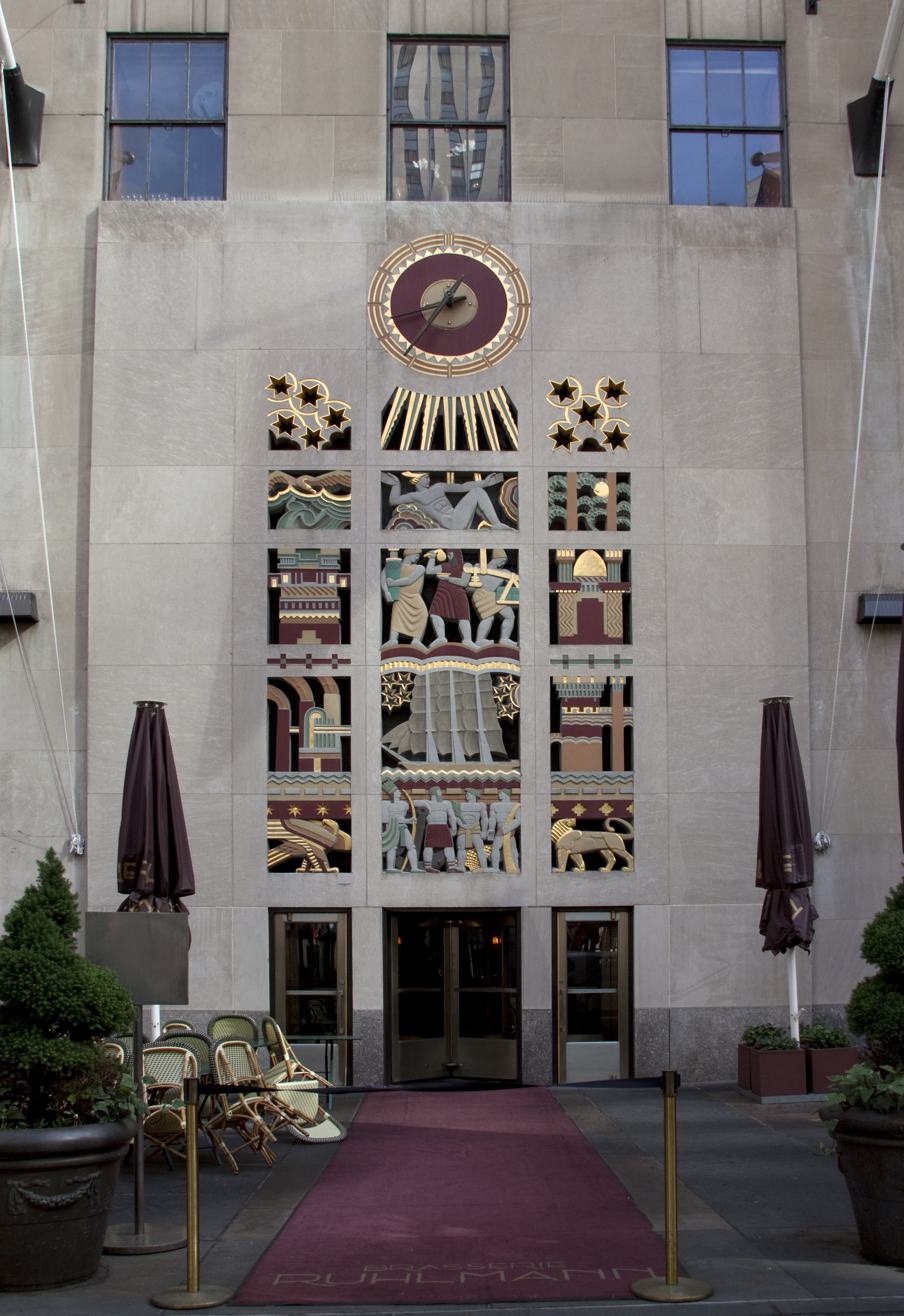
Lawrie's stone screen

At the far west end of the 50th Street elevation is a third entrance. Above this, Lawrie designed a screen of 15 hieroglyphic panels, arranged in five rows with three bays each. The screen measures 15.5 ft (4.7 m) wide by 21.5 ft (6.6 m) tall and was designed to be backlit. The screen contains several sets of symbolic figures. The lowest panel in the center bay contains four men, each signifying a different race; the figures have the same skin color and are identified by their sculptural features. This panel is flanked by an eagle to the left (representing republics) and a lion to the right (representing kingdoms). The second row from the bottom contains a factory with smokestacks, a ship of trade, and a Norman-era tower from left to right. The center bay contains a panel with three men representing art, science, and industry in the third row, as wells a representation of the Roman god Mercury in the fourth row. These are flanked by panels depicting "man's four habitats": a mosque (the East), an Aztec temple (the West), palm trees (the South), and a seagull and whale fluke (the North). The center bay of the top row represents the rays of the sun, with the Big Dipper to the left and the Southern Cross to the right, representing the two hemispheres. Above the center bay is a clock measuring 6 ft (1.8 m) across. Lawrie drew sketches of the screen, which Rene Paul Chambellan then executed as clay models.

==== Rockefeller Plaza ====
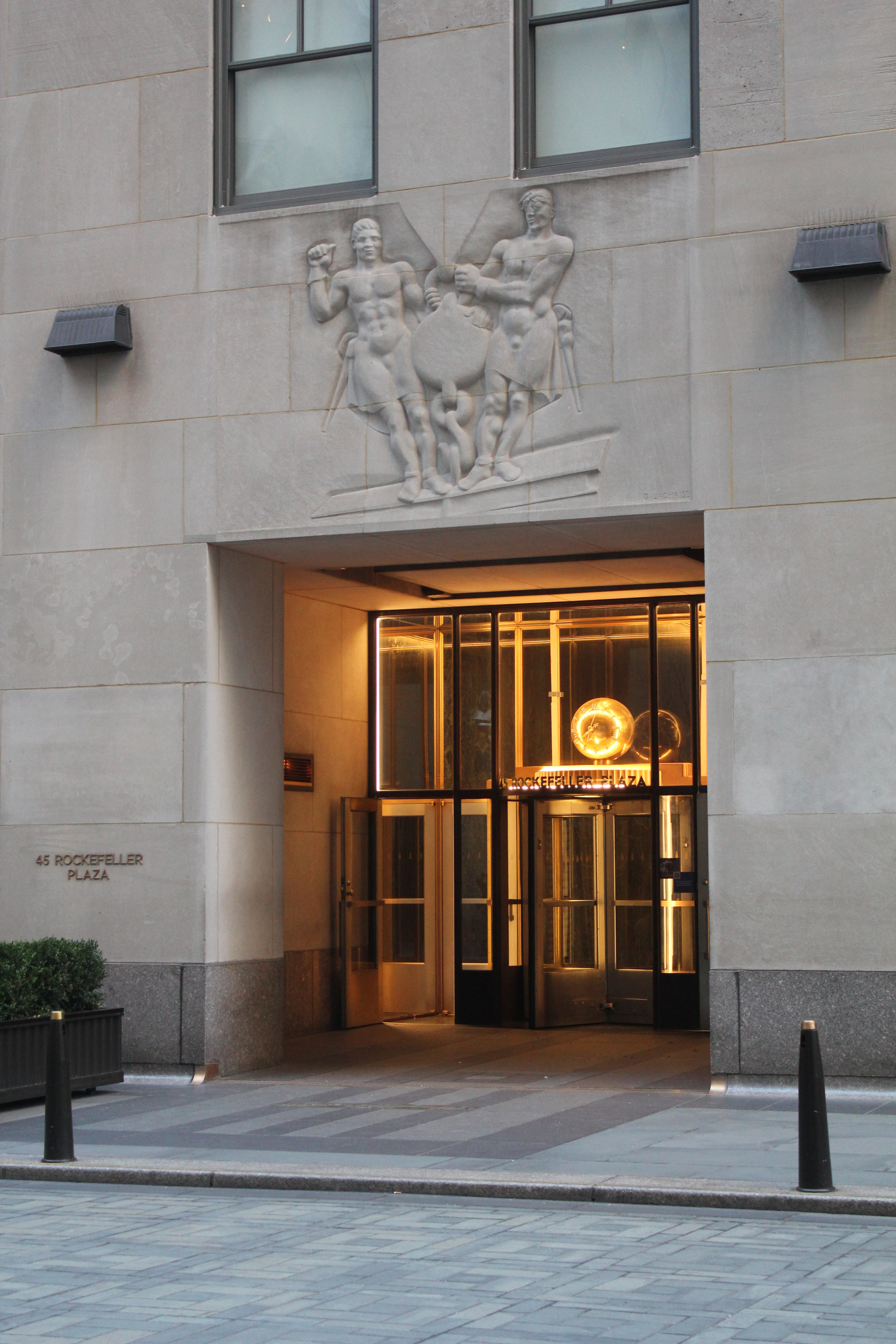
45 Rockefeller Plaza entrance

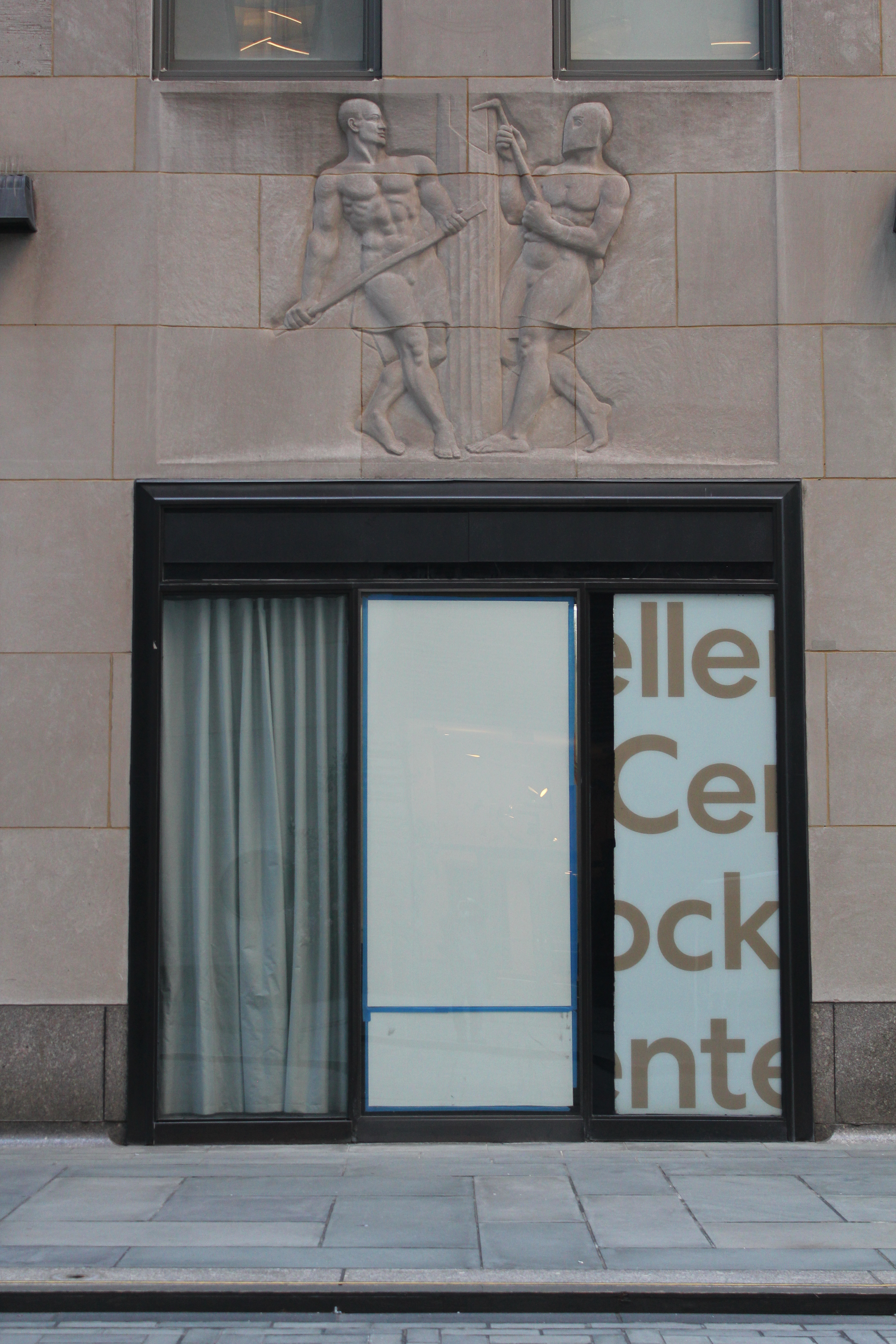
Former 41 Rockefeller Plaza entrance

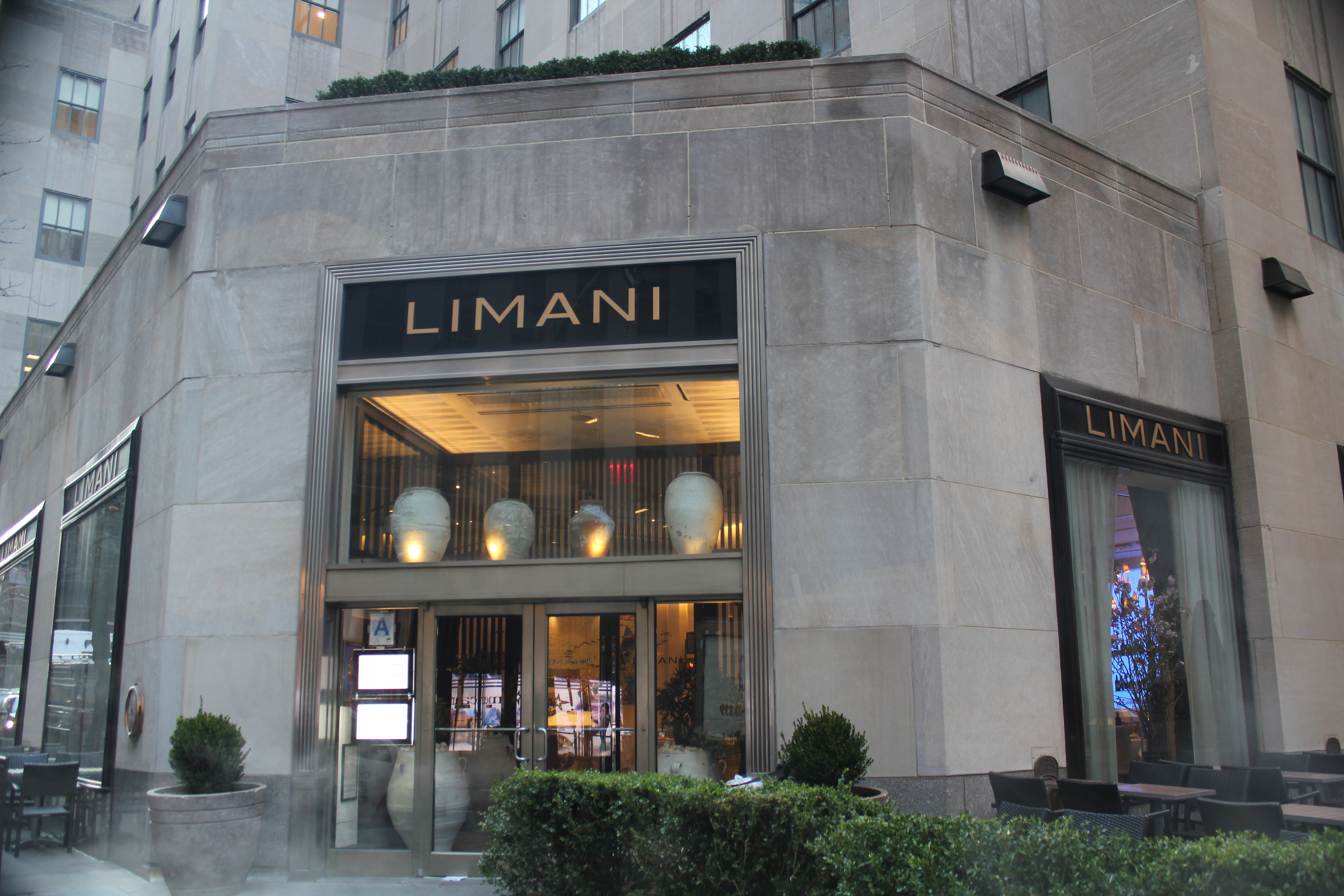
Chamfered storefront

The facade's rear elevation on Rockefeller Plaza contains storefronts and display windows. The rear elevation contains two limestone reliefs by Gaston Lachaise, which honor the workers who built the complex. They were two of six carvings Lachaise did for Rockefeller Center, the other four being at the rear of 30 Rockefeller Plaza. The panels are placed above what were originally entrances at 41 Rockefeller Plaza (to the right) and 45 Rockefeller Plaza (to the left). Each panel measures 12 by 7 ft (3.7 by 2.1 m). The left panel shows two workers riding on a steel beam, the worker on the left giving the signal, "raise the beam." The right panel shows workmen demolishing buildings on the site: one with a crowbar and the other with a blowtorch.

After the building's completion, the rear elevation was modified to reflect Isamu Noguchi's design of 50 Rockefeller Plaza's entrance. As a result, the entrance at 41 Rockefeller Plaza has been infilled and replaced with a storefront. The remaining entrance at 45 Rockefeller Plaza is recessed deeply from the facade. There are three storefronts to the left (north) and four to the right (south) of the remaining entrance. In addition, the northwest corner was replaced with a diagonal chamfer, the only one in the original Rockefeller Center complex.

==== 51st Street ====
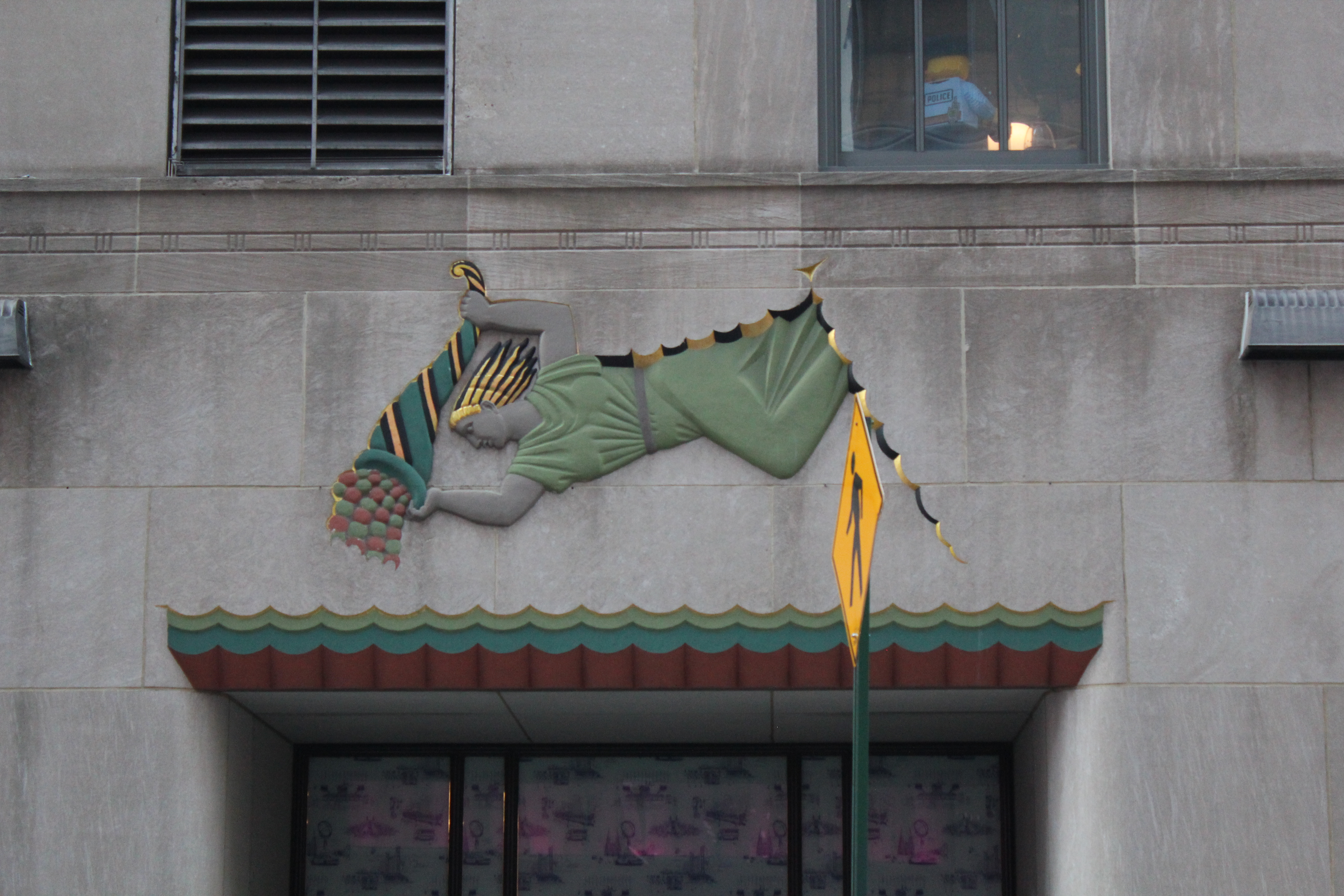
Lintel at 10 West 51st Street entrance

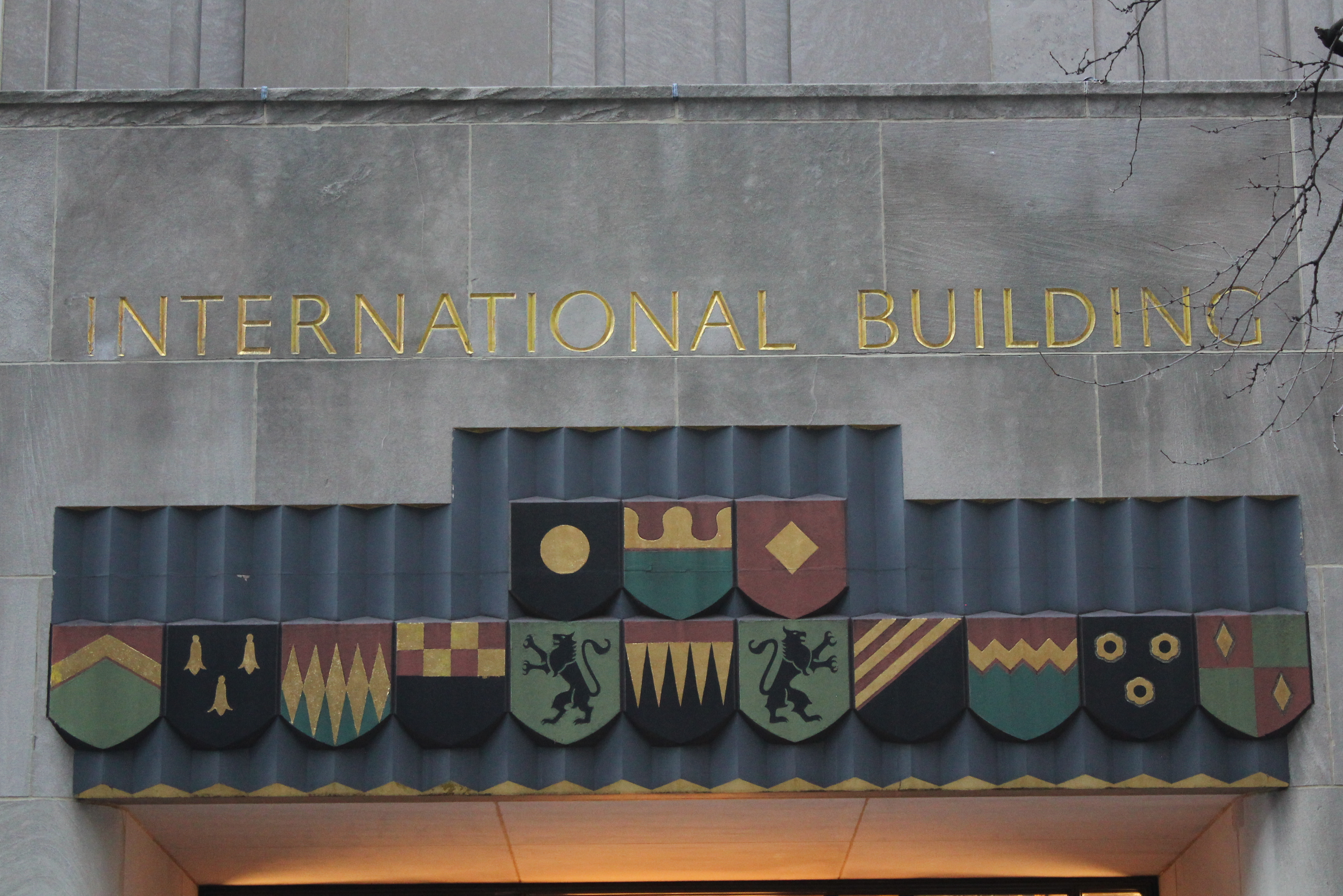
Lintel at 20 West 51st Street entrance

On 51st Street, there are several storefronts and display windows, interrupted by two entrances at 10 and 20 West 51st Street. A cornice runs above the first story there. For the 10 West 51st Street entrance (leading to International Building North), Lawrie designed a bas-relief with a woman and horn as an allegory for world cooperation. The woman wears a green robe and is depicted as a flying figure, arising from gilded clouds with black borders. The horn contains green-and-gold dots depicting cornucopia. Beneath the woman are three scalloped bands, which represent waves. From top to bottom, the bands are green, blue, and brown. Leon V. Solon collaborated with Lawrie in the coloring of the carving.

Further west along 51st Street is an entrance to the main tower at 20 West 51st Street. Above this is a lintel with gray-green trim and diagonally-oriented ridges. Lawrie designed 14 heraldic shields in front of the lintel. These shields are arranged in two rows, with three shields on the upper row and eleven on the lower row. Solon collaborated with Lawrie in the coloring of the shields. While the coats of arms are fictional, they were intended to represent the international character of the building. Gold letters with the building's name are placed above these shields. The sidewalk of the entryway is made of gray-and-pink pavement and includes ornamental bronze plates.

=== Interior ===
The superstructure uses 22,750 short tons (20,310 long tons; 20,640 t) of steel. When built, the International Building had 827,149 ft^{2} (76,844.7 m^{2}) of office space. The building included several modern mechanical systems, including a "selective cooling system", characterized in Architectural Forum as "probably the most important single advance in the technique of large-scale cooling". The International Building's lobby was inspired by the triangular lobby of the Chrysler Building and the chapel-like lobby of the Empire State Building. As the International Building was not as big as 30 Rockefeller Plaza, the Associated Architects designed the lobby to give an illusion of grandeur.

==== Lobby ====
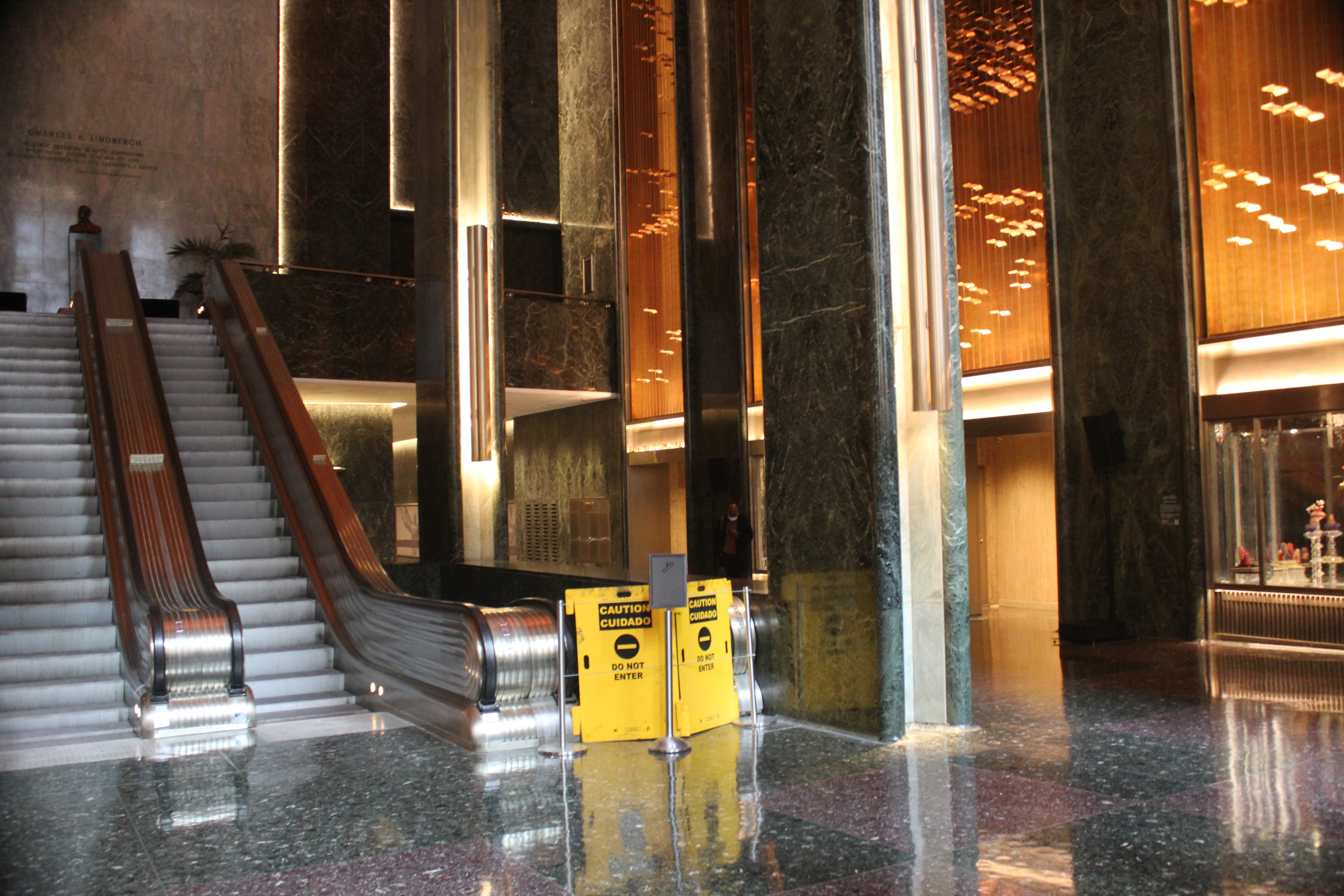
Lobby view

The lobby includes veined green marble piers spanning the height of each wall. The east wall has three glass-and-nickel bronze revolving doors underneath a sign with "Fifth Avenue" in nickel bronze capital letters. St. Patrick's Cathedral is visible through the glass panels above these doors. The north and south walls were originally used as storefronts. Above the storefronts were three-story-tall metal-framed openings, intended for exhibitions. However, no exhibits were ever installed, and advertising panels were placed there instead. Since 1978, the upper walls have included metallic structures designed by Michio Ihara. These comprise stainless-steel cables with gold leaves amid a gold-leaf background. There are 1,600 leaves, each in a different position and shape. Because the panels are backlit, many visitors consider them part of the lobby's lighting scheme.

As designed, the lobby had tiled floors with patterned red and green mosaic tiles. There are four green marble pillars supporting the ceiling, topped by nickel bronze moldings. The pillars have an H-shaped cross-section. Their marble cladding conceals their internal steel structure, and reflectors are embedded in the surface, providing illumination. Between the pillars are four escalators, two ascending to an upper mezzanine and two descending to the complex's underground mall. These also have nickel bronze gilding. The lobby's ceiling is 54 ft (16 m) high and is made of copper leaf. The ceiling does not contain lighting fixtures; the space is instead illuminated by the side walls, main entrance windows, and columns.

Three-story-high hallways stretch north and south of the lobby, leading to the Palazzo d'Italia and International Building North. Two additional passageways run west, connecting with the elevator lobbies and Rockefeller Plaza. Marble piers, topped by nickel bronze moldings, surround the green-marble walls of the elevator bank at ground level. Reeded moldings of marble are placed at the corners of these piers.

The mezzanine level includes Paul Fjelde's bronze bust of Charles Lindbergh, installed in 1975. There are red terrazzo tiles on the mezzanine's floor, surrounded by nickel-bronze bands. The mezzanine also has green marble walls, as well as corridors to the north and south leading to the annexes. The openings to each corridor are surrounded by reeded moldings made of marble. Signs with the text "Mezzanine North Corridor" and "Mezzanine South Corridor" are placed above the corridor openings. The basement connects to other buildings at Rockefeller Center, including 30 Rockefeller Plaza, the British Empire Building, and La Maison Francaise. This tunnel is 60 ft (18 m) wide; its roof, 7 ft (2.1 m) below 50th Street, is held up by six steel pillars and steel girders.

==== Other stories ====
The passenger elevators are placed in a central core, ringed by a rectangular corridor on each floor. The interiors of the elevator cabs were clad in metal with strips of wood veneer. There were originally 28 elevators. At the building's opening, Westinghouse Electric Corporation equipped the elevator cabs with a "quota control" system, under which elevator calls would be distributed evenly to prevent overcrowding. One original cab was donated to the Metropolitan Museum of Art in 1979.

Offices surround the corridors on each of the levels above the four-story lobby. The office stories are arranged in a similar plan to the lobby. The complex's original architect, Raymond Hood, ensured that all of the offices in the entire complex be a maximum of 27 ft (8.2 m) from a window since that was the maximum distance that sunlight could permeate the windows of a building at New York City's latitude.

== History ==
=== Development ===
The construction of Rockefeller Center occurred between 1932 and 1940 (Note: 30 Rockefeller Plaza was the first building to start construction, in September 1932. The last building was completed in 1940.) on land that John D. Rockefeller Jr. leased from Columbia University. The Rockefeller Center site was originally supposed to be occupied by a new opera house for the Metropolitan Opera. By 1928, Benjamin Wistar Morris and designer Joseph Urban were hired to come up with blueprints for the house. However, the new building was too expensive for the opera to fund by itself, and it needed an endowment. The project ultimately gained the support of John D. Rockefeller Jr. The planned opera house was canceled in December 1929 due to various issues, and Rockefeller quickly negotiated with Radio Corporation of America (RCA) and its subsidiaries, National Broadcasting Company (NBC) and Radio-Keith-Orpheum (RKO), to build a mass media entertainment complex on the site. By May 1930, RCA and its affiliates had agreed to develop the site.

==== Planning ====
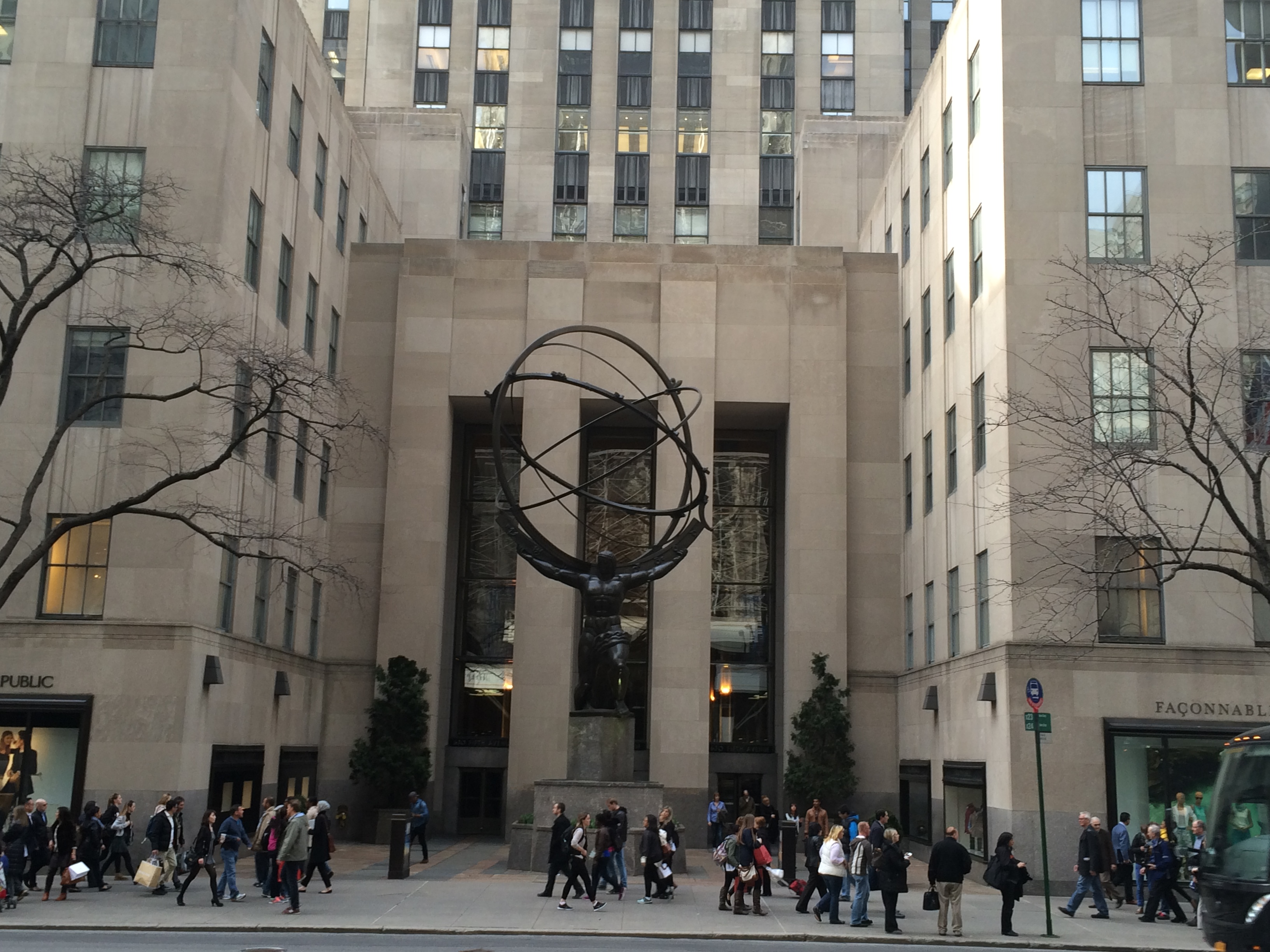
The main plaza with the Atlas statue

When plans for Rockefeller Center arose, a retail building with an oval plan was planned for the adjacent block to the south, between 49th and 50th Streets. This was scrapped in early 1931. An updated proposal for that site called for a 41-story tower and a pair of six-story retail buildings. As American tenants were reluctant to rent in these retail buildings, Rockefeller Center's manager Hugh Robertson, formerly of Todd, Robertson and Todd, suggested foreign tenants for the buildings. Rockefeller Center's managers held talks with prospective Czech, German, Italian, and Swedish lessees who could potentially occupy the six-story internationally themed buildings on Fifth Avenue. Dutch, Chinese, Japanese, and Russian tenants were also reportedly considered. Because the canceled oval building had contained rooftop gardens, Raymond Hood suggested the idea for rooftop gardens across the complex, including on all of the retail buildings. These gardens would be curated by Ralph Hancock.

A department store and 45-story building was planned for the site of the current International Building, between 50th and 51st Streets, with the department store portion facing Fifth Avenue. When the department store was canceled, the building was downsized to 30 stories, then to 14 stories. The retail buildings on the block to the south, the British Empire Building and La Maison Francaise, were respectively leased by Britain and France. The final plans did not arise until after the British and French buildings were completed, when the architects decided that a series of identical retail structures on Fifth Avenue would be esthetically pleasing.

The International Building plan was modified to its current status in June 1932, along with its two retail wings, which were nearly identical to the retail buildings to their south. After making this change, Hood resigned from the development of Rockefeller Center because of his illness. With this plan, the main tower was increased to 38 stories. The retail wings were to be connected to the main tower via a four-story galleria measuring 60 ft (18 m) wide and 100 ft (30 m) long. The southern wing had been named the Italian Building (later the Palazzo d'Italia), and Italy's dictator Benito Mussolini had expressed his approval of the project. Mussolini was impressed by the wing's 9-story height, which beat the 6-story height of the French and British buildings. Rockefeller Center's officials projected that the northern wing would be occupied by German interests.

==== Construction and opening ====
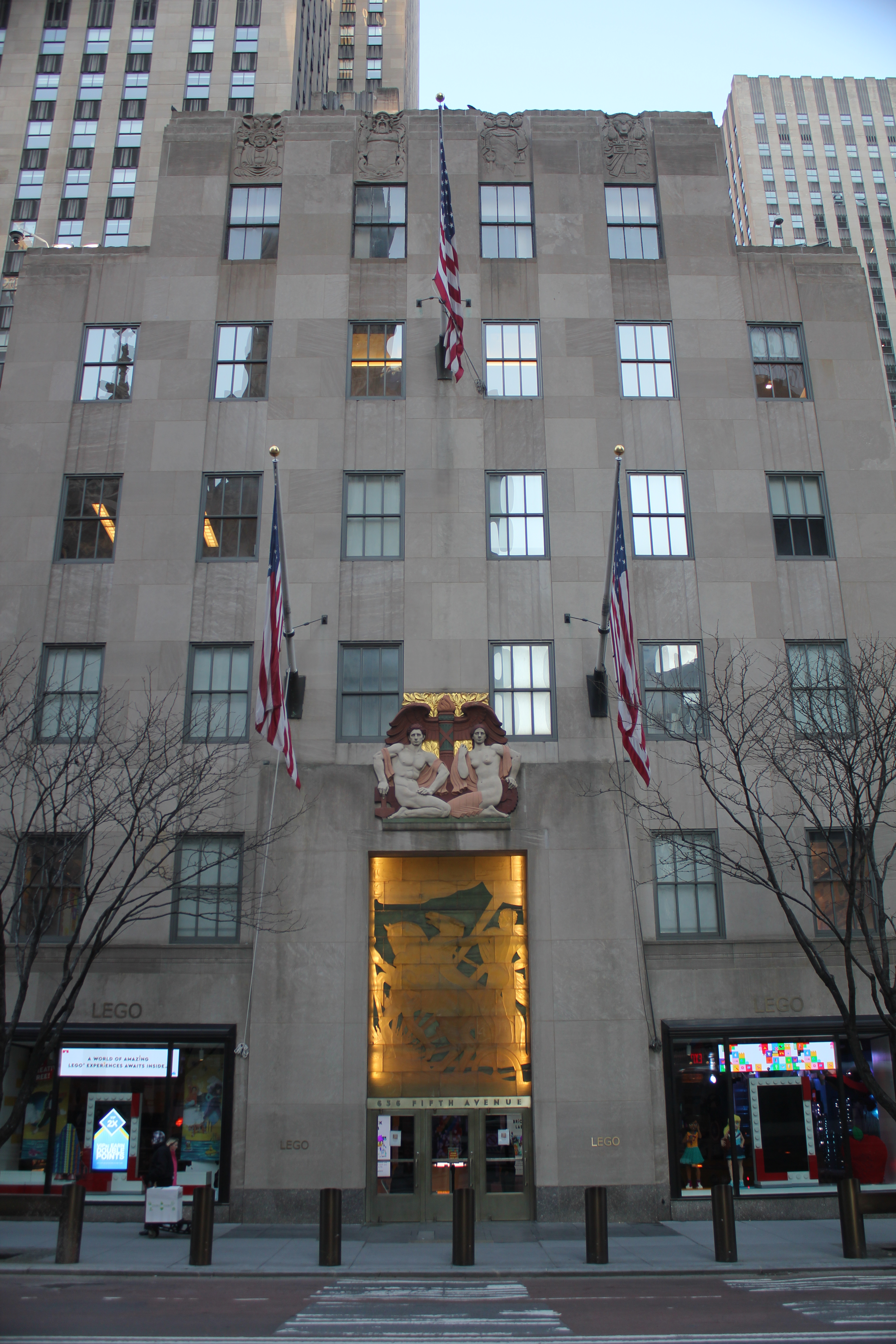
Entrance to International Building North

In March 1933, a company led by Italian senator Vittorio Scialoja was established for the purpose of operating the Palazzo d'Italia. The wing was to be occupied by four subsidiaries of that company, known as the Commercial, Art, Food, and Tourist corporations. By early July, Rockefeller Center's developers had leased 40,000 ft^{2} (3,700 m^{2}) of space in the Palazzo, representing about a third of that structure's total floor area. A groundbreaking ceremony for Palazzo d'Italia took place on July 12, 1933, attended by Italian senator Antonio Mosconi, Rockefeller Center Inc. president Arthur Woods, and John D. Rockefeller Jr.'s son Nelson Rockefeller. The otherwise formal event was interrupted by a fascist chant led by an unemployed bricklayer. Rockefeller Center Inc. filed plans with the New York City Department of Buildings in May 1934 for the two wings and a 38-story, 512 ft (156 m) International Tower at 45 Rockefeller Plaza.

The final small wing would have been rented by Germany under the name "Deutsches Haus", but Rockefeller ruled this out following Adolf Hitler's rise to power in 1932. Russia started negotiating to lease the north wing in 1934, but the Russians were no longer actively seeking a lease by the next year. With no definite tenant for the northernmost building, the Rockefeller Center's managers reduced the proposed nine-story wings to six stories, enlarged and realigned the main building from a north–south to a west–east axis, and replaced the galleria between the two retail wings with an expansion of the International Building's lobby. The empty office site thus became International Building North, rented by various tenants.

The steel frame for the Palazzo was constructed starting in September 1934, after the plans had been modified. Work proceeded quickly, with the building rising about 4 ft (1.2 m) per day. The International Building's construction involved 1.3 million man-hours of work, during which only 5,000-man-hours of delays were reported due to accidents. The low accident rate was attributed to construction contractors' use of modern safety measures, as well as the use of automatic equipment and two staging areas for columns and beams on the building's seventh floor. In April 1935, Nelson Rockefeller hosted a ceremony in the International Building's lobby, giving craftsmanship awards to 31 workers who were involved in the project. When Rockefeller Center's developers opened the building on May 1, 1935, only 136 days had elapsed from groundbreaking to completion. The International Building was seen as a symbol of solidarity during the interwar period, when Italy's entry in the League of Nations was obstructed by American isolationists.

=== 1930s to 1960s ===
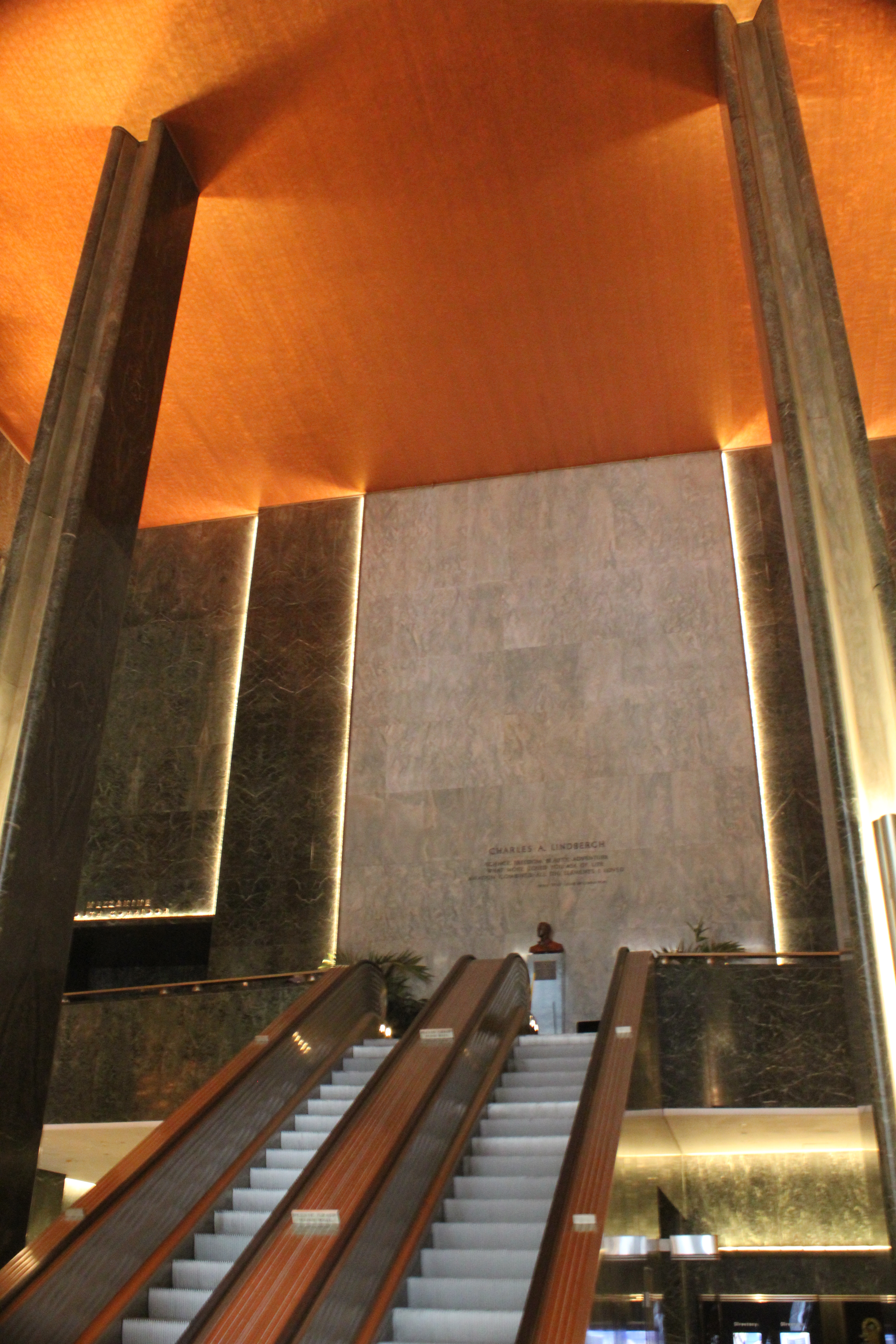
View of lobby, looking toward mezzanine

The month after the building opened, Rockefeller Center's managers selected Piccirilli, Lawrie, Lachaise, Chambellan, and Lentelli to create work for the International Building. Lachaise's panels on the rear entrance were unveiled shortly afterward. Piccirilli's work for Palazzo d'Italia was installed in July 1935, followed by his work for International Building North in April 1936. Lawrie's Atlas was installed in January 1937, and his panels above three of the entrances on 50th and 51st Streets were unveiled in September 1937.

Among the earliest tenants were booking offices for the Cunard-White Star Line, Furness Withy, and the Italian Line. Sinclair Oil leased seven stories in the building in July 1935, bringing the building's occupancy to 40 percent. Other early tenants included United States Tobacco Company, the Bristol Myers Company, the Swedish American Line, the Berlitz Language School, the Chalif School of Dancing, and a tourist bureau of the federal government of Mexico. The building was also used for events such as New York Times book fairs and an international dance exhibition. A permanent art gallery was announced for the building's mezzanine and third floor in 1938. By the late 1930s, tobacco firm Liggett & Myers, watch company Bulova, jeweler Van Cleef & Arpels, the International Alliance of Theatrical Stage Employees, and nine consulates had leased office space at the International Building.

The International Building soon became a hub for consular offices; at the beginning of 1941, there were 19 consulates. Though the U.S. government forced the closure of the Italian consulate that June, Rockefeller Center officials initially indicated they would not rename the Palazzo. With the United States' entry into World War II that December, the Japanese consulate at the building was closed and Piccirilli's artwork on the Palazzo wing boarded up, as the U.S. was fighting both Japan and Italy. At this time, the Palazzo d'Italia was renamed International Building South. The building continued to host exhibitions, including a Sculptors Guild display in 1942 and a showcase of Le Corbusier art in 1945. In 1945, Bankers Trust leased a bank branch on three stories in International Building South, filing alteration plans with the Department of Buildings. The branch spanned the basement, ground, and mezzanine levels with safe-deposit vaults below the basement. Also around this time, the northwest corner of the ground floor was modified. The Italian tourist bureau finally returned in 1949, at which point International Building South was planned to be renamed Palazzo d'Italia.

When Sinclair Oil built a new headquarters two blocks south at 600 Fifth Avenue in the early 1950s, it vacated seven stories of space, which were quickly taken by Simon & Schuster and Esso. Occupants of the storefront space during this time included American President Lines, which remodeled a storefront in International Building North; the United States Passport Agency; and the Egyptian government. By 1954, the International Building contained travel and information bureaus for 22 countries. During the 1960s, the building housed executive offices for companies such as Xerox, Bulova, and Executive House Hotels. The Italia panel was installed above the Palazzo's main entrance in 1965. A bomb detonated outside the building in 1968, though there were only minor damage and two injuries.

=== 1970s and 1980s ===
The Investors Funding Corporation of New York and the Security National Title and Guaranty Company took up three floors by the early 1970s. Other tenants during that decade were the Consolidated Newsprint Company, Hanes, and Bank Brussels Lambert. Fjelde's bust of Charles Lindbergh was dedicated in the lobby in 1975, and Ihara's Light and Movement was installed there in 1978 after Nelson Rockefeller, a modern-art connoisseur, had commissioned a structure to fill the empty lobby walls. Rockefeller Center's managers cleaned the facade of the International Building and its wings during 1979 as part of a restoration program across the entire complex. Manship's 6 ft-tall (1.8 m) statues, which had stood atop the Palazzo d'Italia since it opened, were removed in 1984 and relocated to Rockefeller Center's central plaza.

Columbia University was not making enough money from Rockefeller Center leases by the 1970s, and the university started looking to sell the land beneath Rockefeller Center, including the International Building, in 1983. That year, the New York City Landmarks Preservation Commission (LPC) held hearings to determine how much of Rockefeller Center should be protected as a landmark. The Rockefeller family and Columbia University acknowledged that the buildings were already symbolically landmarks, but their spokesman John E. Zuccotti recommended that only the block between 49th and 50th Streets be protected; (Note: Namely 1250 Avenue of the Americas, 30 Rockefeller Plaza, the British Empire Building, La Maison Francaise, the Channel Gardens, and the Lower Plaza) the International Building was excluded from this area. By contrast, almost everyone else who supported Rockefeller Center's landmark status recommended that the entire complex be landmarked. The LPC granted landmark status to the exteriors of all of the original complex's buildings, as well as the interiors of the International Building's and 30 Rockefeller Plaza's lobbies, on April 23, 1985. (Note: The final exterior landmark designation covers 12 buildings as well as the Channel Gardens, Rockefeller Plaza, and Lower Plaza. These are 1230, 1250, and 1270 Avenue of the Americas; 1, 10, 30, 50, and 75 Rockefeller Plaza; the British Empire Building; the International Building; La Maison Francaise; and Radio City Music Hall.) Rockefeller Center's original buildings also became a National Historic Landmark in 1987.

Meanwhile, Columbia had agreed to sell the land to the Rockefeller Group for $400 million in February 1985. The Rockefeller Group formed Rockefeller Center Inc. that July to manage the International Building and other properties. The roof gardens of the wings were restored in 1986 at a cost of $48,000 for each garden. The complex became a National Historic Landmark in 1987. Mitsubishi Estate, a real estate company of the Mitsubishi Group, purchased a majority stake in the Rockefeller Group in 1988, including the International Building and Rockefeller Center's other structures.

=== 1990s to present ===
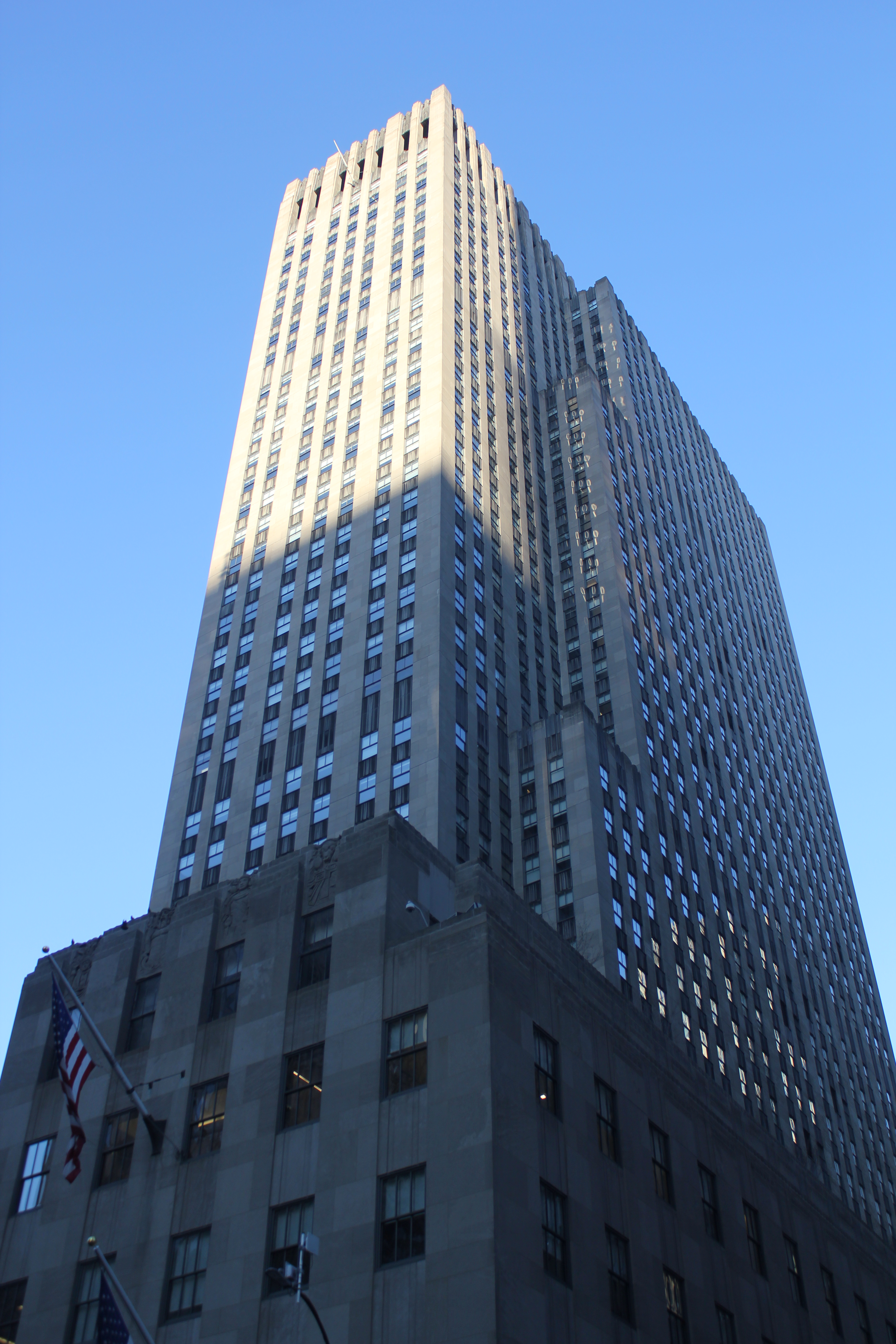
View from Fifth Avenue and 51st Street

By the early 1990s, the International Building was 87 percent occupied. During that decade, the International Building contained a business center shared by several small tenants, with reception and communications services as well as conference rooms. The Rockefeller Group filed for bankruptcy protection in May 1995 after missing several mortgage payments. That November, John Rockefeller Jr.'s son David and a consortium led by Goldman Sachs agreed to buy Rockefeller Center's buildings for $1.1 billion, beating out Sam Zell and other bidders. The transaction included $306 million for the mortgage and $845 million for other expenses. The International Building's U.S. passport office moved out during 1998 and was replaced by a three-story New York Sports Club. A preservation dispute arose in May 1998, when the owners announced plans to enlarge shop windows on the center's Fifth Avenue buildings to two stories. The window sizes were reduced upon the LPC's request, and the modifications were approved in September 1998.

Tishman Speyer, led by David Rockefeller's close friend Jerry Speyer and the Lester Crown family of Chicago, bought the original 14 buildings and land in December 2000 for $1.85 billion, including the International Building. The new owners opened several restaurants throughout the complex, including Campari and Brasserie Ruhlmann at the ground floor. Office tenants during the 2000s included investment firm AlpInvest Partners; stock-market indices provider FTSE Group; law firms BakerHostetler and Venable LLP; and radio network Premiere Networks. The Atlas statue at the entrance was restored in 2008. During the 2010s, office tenants included satellite television provider DirecTV, TV Guide Magazine, private equity advisory firm Campbell Lutyens, and Rockefeller Capital Management.

In 2020, Tishman Speyer hired Gabellini Sheppard Associates to design a renovation for the lobby. The plans included cleaning wall and floor surfaces, adding recessed lighting, and creating brass niches beneath Ihara's lobby structures. The Lego Group opened a Lego Store at the building in June 2021, and the restaurant Le Rock opened there in late 2022. Gabellini Sheppard Associates' renovation of the lobby was completed by early 2024.

== Reception ==
At the International Building's completion, Architectural Forum wrote, "The form of the building is severe and rather clunky", with the main slab rising its full height without any setbacks on Fifth Avenue. Conversely, Architectural Forum wrote that the plaza had "splendid and imposing design" and that the lobby was "one of the best things of its kind that has yet been done". Paul Goldberger of The New York Times wrote in 1976 that the escalators at the center of the lobby were "a modern equivalent of the triumphal staircase". Six years later, Goldberger said 30 Rockefeller Plaza's form, "made sumptuous by its mounting setbacks", contrasted with the "smaller and bulkier" International Building and other structures in the complex. Architect and writer Robert A. M. Stern wrote in his 1987 book New York 1930: "Its virtually reveal-less facades and detail-free columns and piers were complemented by the severe machine-like precision of the interior details."

== See also ==
- Art Deco architecture of New York City
- List of New York City Designated Landmarks in Manhattan from 14th to 59th Streets
