= Alfred Janniot =

French sculptor

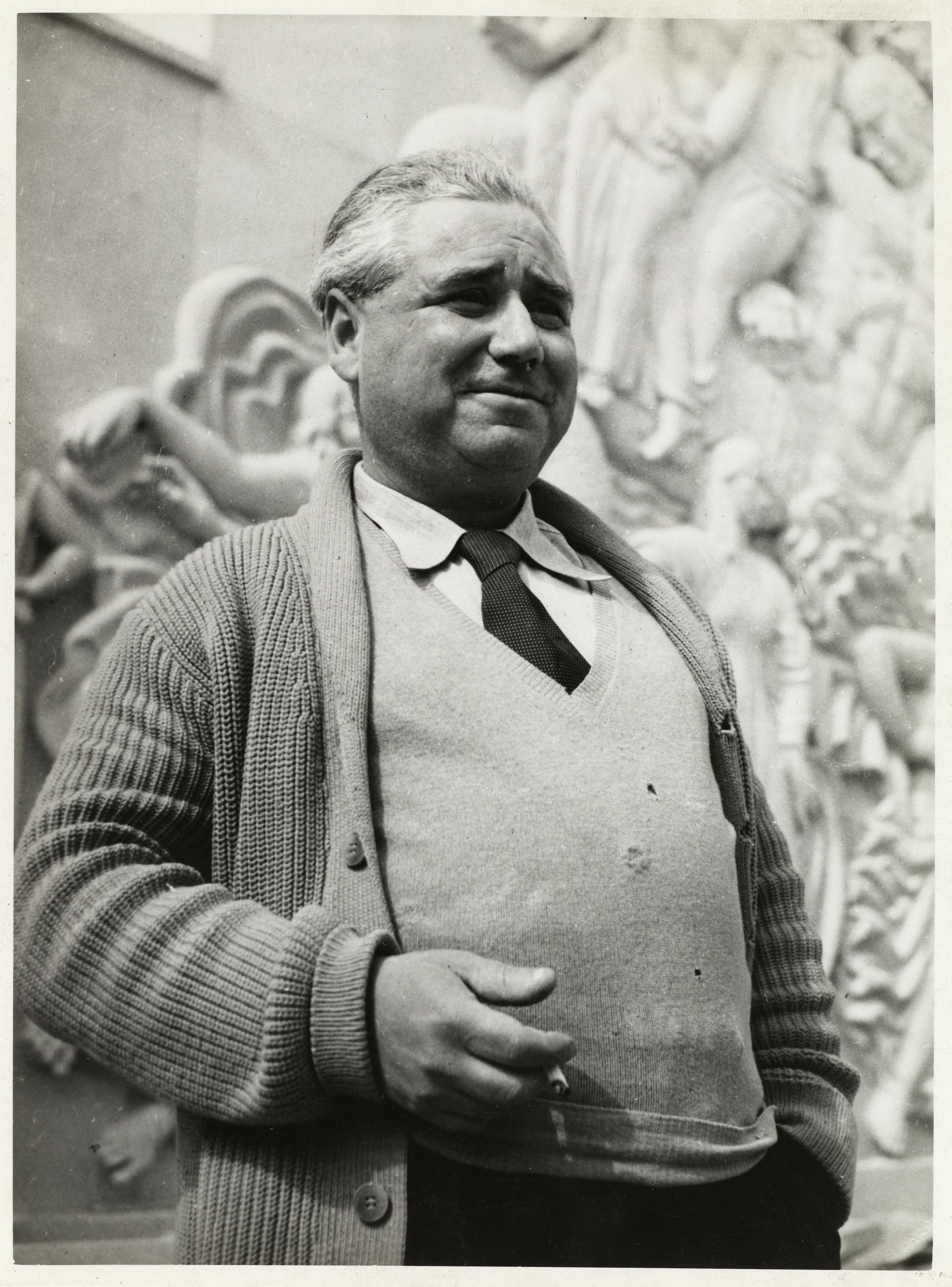
Alfred Janniot in 1937

Alfred Auguste Janniot (French: [alfʁɛd oɡyst ʒanjo]; 13 June 1889 – 15 July 1969) was a French Art Deco sculptor most active in the 1930s.

== Biography ==
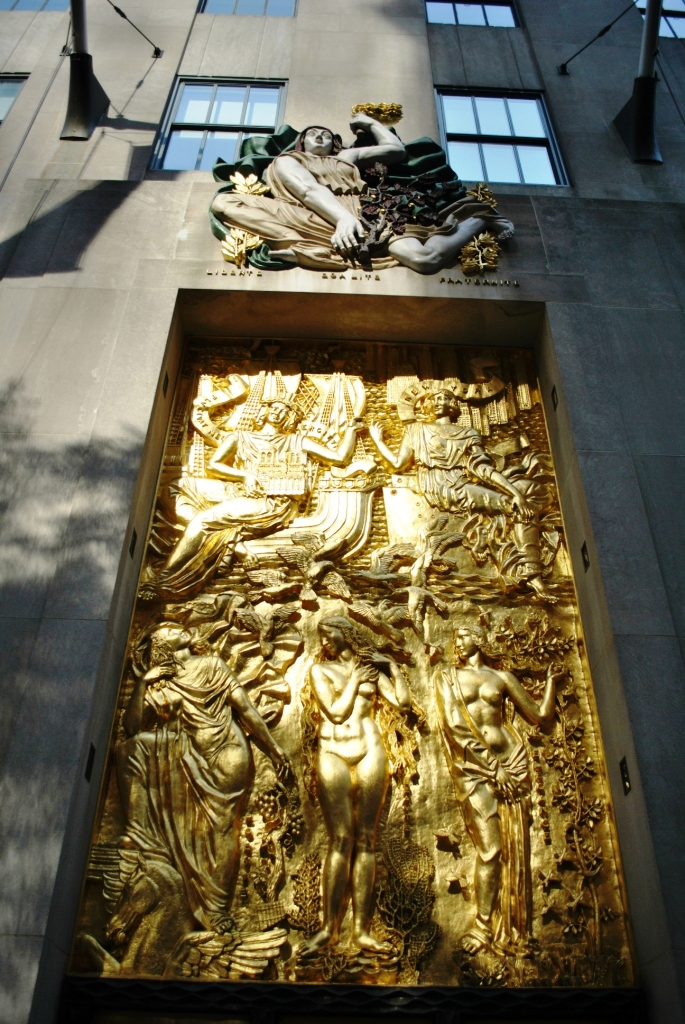
Gilded panel, the Maison Française at Rockefeller Center

Janniot was educated at the École des Beaux-Arts in Paris, a pupil of Jean Antoine Injalbert, and was the winner of the 1919 Prix de Rome. Under the influence of Antoine Bourdelle, most of Janniot's career was devoted to monumental and architectural sculpture.

In 1938 he became an officer in the Legion of Honor. From 1945 through 1959, he held the title of Professor of Monumental Art at the École des Beaux-Arts.

His extensive bas-reliefs on the Palais de la Porte Dorée in Paris – built in 1931 for the Paris Colonial Exposition – portray ships, oceans, and wildlife, including antelopes, elephants, zebras, and snakes. Janniot also contributed the gilded panel Paris and New York Joining Hands Above Figures of Poetry, Beauty and Elegance on the façade of the Maison Française, Rockefeller Center, circa 1930.

He died on 15 July 1969 at Neuilly-sur-Seine.

== Other work ==
- Legend of the Earth and Legend of the Sea reliefs on the southern facade of the Palais de Tokyo, Paris, 1937
- Fountain of the Sun, Place Masséna, Nice, completed 1957, removed in the 1970s and reinstalled in 2011
- decor for the ocean liner Normandie
