= John Polachek =

John Polachek (industrialist)
- Born: Moscar, Hungary
- Died: April 16, 1955 (aged 81–82); New York City, U.S.
- Known for: bronze fabrication, General Bronze Corporation
- Spouse: Susan
- Parent(s): Ignatz and Amalia Polachek

John Polachek (1873 – April 16, 1955) was an industrialist, known for founding the General Bronze Corporation in New York City.

== Life and career ==
Polachek was born in Mocsar, Hungary, in 1873, the son of Ignatz and Amalia Polachek. After arriving in the United States with only a pocket-full of change in 1892, Polachek began working at the William H. Jackson Company in Long Island City, Queens, New York City. He quickly climbed the ladder from laborer to foreman, eventually earning him favor with upper management. His employment with William H. Jackson Co. served as the foundation for his coming endeavors in bronze fabrication. In 1903, he left William H. Jackson Co., and became a supervisor overseeing bronze manufacturing at the Tiffany Glass Studios in Corona, Queens New York, in which he further applied his trade of stonemasonry and learned the trade of metalworking. Tiffany Glass Studios, which commonly referred to their product as "favrile glass" or "Tiffany glass", would use bronze in their artisan work, particularly Tiffany lamps. Polachek would later buy the Tiffany Studios, which had been re-branded as the Roman Bronze Works.

== Early life ==
Polachek's grand idea was to become the leader in the use of bronze for metal fabrication. He foresaw the need for bronze with the advent of its worldwide expansion. The use of bronze, as a result of its increased demand in the architectural and art world, followed. Polacheck anticipated the requirement for bronze and sought to fill that opportunity for the much-needed metal "bronze" that occurred simultaneously with the rise of Art Deco, Art Nouveau, and international movements. The implementation of bronze in one's construction project or artwork became avant-garde or popular, since it was the cutting-edge style at the time. Polacheck's intuition paid dividends finding his bonanza in the bronze fabrication trade.

== John Polacheck Bronze & Iron Works Company ==
In 1910, after saving enough money, Polachek left Tiffany Glass Studios and opened his own bronze architectural company in a loft, called the John Polacheck Bronze & Iron Works Company at 480-494 Hancock Street & 577-591 Boulevard, Long Island City, Queens. But three months later, the two banks in which he deposited his money went bankrupt, and he borrowed $400 to pay his workers and meet his payroll. "Three months after I started I lost every cent I had put Into the business. The office boy called me up and told me that the two banks where I deposited my money had failed," according to Polachek, and then recounted, "It was a terrible shock. I didn't know whether to tell my men and let them go or keep them in ignorance of what had happened."

He slowly saved his money again, and opened his business in another loft under the same name. In 1912 he purchased a 1.75-acre site in Long Island City, Queens at 34-19 Tenth Street. He hired fifty men, and it grew to one of the most important bronze fabricators in the field. In 1923, the John Polachek Bronze Company grew exponentially, and he finally incorporated the new entity, giving twenty-two workers who had been managers (those men with him from the beginning in 1910), a share in the corporation. "They received substantial dividends a few months ago when the business was reorganized. He turned over to them stock amounting to a million dollars."

== General Bronze Corporation ==
With the booming bronze industry, changing the landscape of the metal working industry for the foreseeable future, Polachek acquired his competitors. "When I reorganized my business last November I was able to buy them out." General Bronze became a larger corporation formed through a merger of the John Polachek Bronze and Iron Company, the Renaissance Bronze and Iron Works, and the Tiffany Studios. In 1927, Polacheck merged his new company with another metals fabricator, the Renaissance Bronze and Iron Works also located in Long Island City, Queens. The new company became known as the General Bronze Corporation. "Office buildings, banks, theaters and municipal structures are replete with ornamental bronze work, and million dollar contracts for the embellishment of a "single building have become quite usual," according to Polachek in an article of the Brooklyn Daily Eagle in 1928. According to Polachek, "the world is "going wild over bronze. The process of making bronze has come down through the ages, taught by experienced craftsmen to their younger apprentices."

Polachek remained at General Bronze Corporation until 1934 as CEO. At the time of his retirement, General Bronze Corporation was the largest company in the architectural bronze industry in the United States, employing 600 workers with assets in excess of $5 million. Besides the world's largest bronze fabricator in 1928, perhaps his greatest legacy was his attitude toward his employees.

When Polachek was asked what he considered the greatest factor in his success, he replied, "I have always believed in treating my workers right."

== Notable General Bronze Corporation Projects ==
The Seagram Building on New York City's Park Avenue remains the "iconic glass box sheathed in bronze, designed by Mies van der Rohe." To supply the demand for bronze required for the construction, the General Bronze Corporation fabricated 3,200,000 pounds (1,600 tons) at its plant in Garden City, New York. It was also known for New York City's Atlas and Prometheus bronze sculptures in Rockefeller Center, the bronze doors for the United States Supreme Court, Commerce, and Department of Justice Buildings in Washington, DC, the aluminum windows for the United Nations Secretariat Building and Chase Manhattan Bank Building.

== Gallery ==
Bronze Sculptures

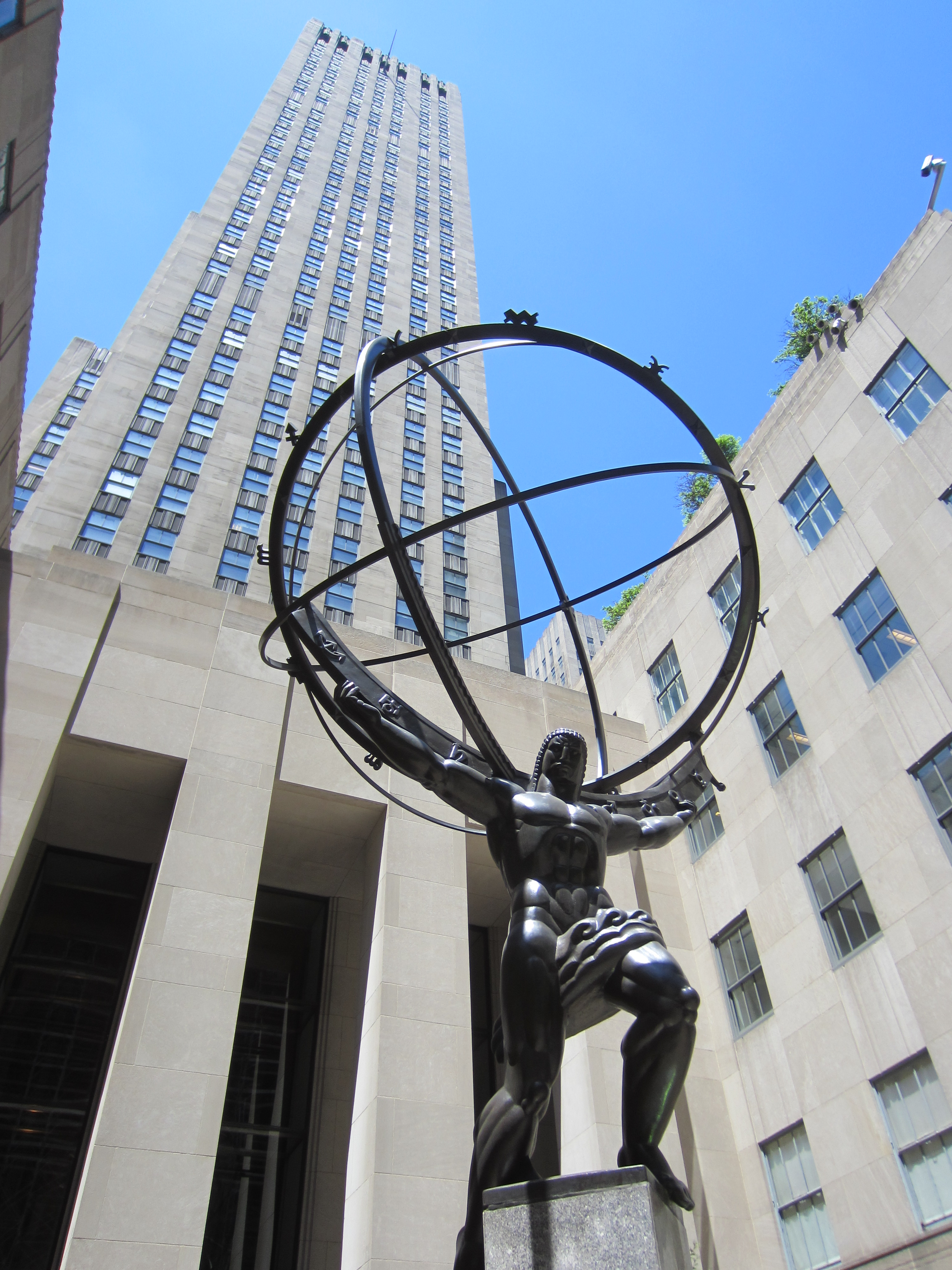
Atlas in the plaza of the International Building of Rockefeller Center, New York City

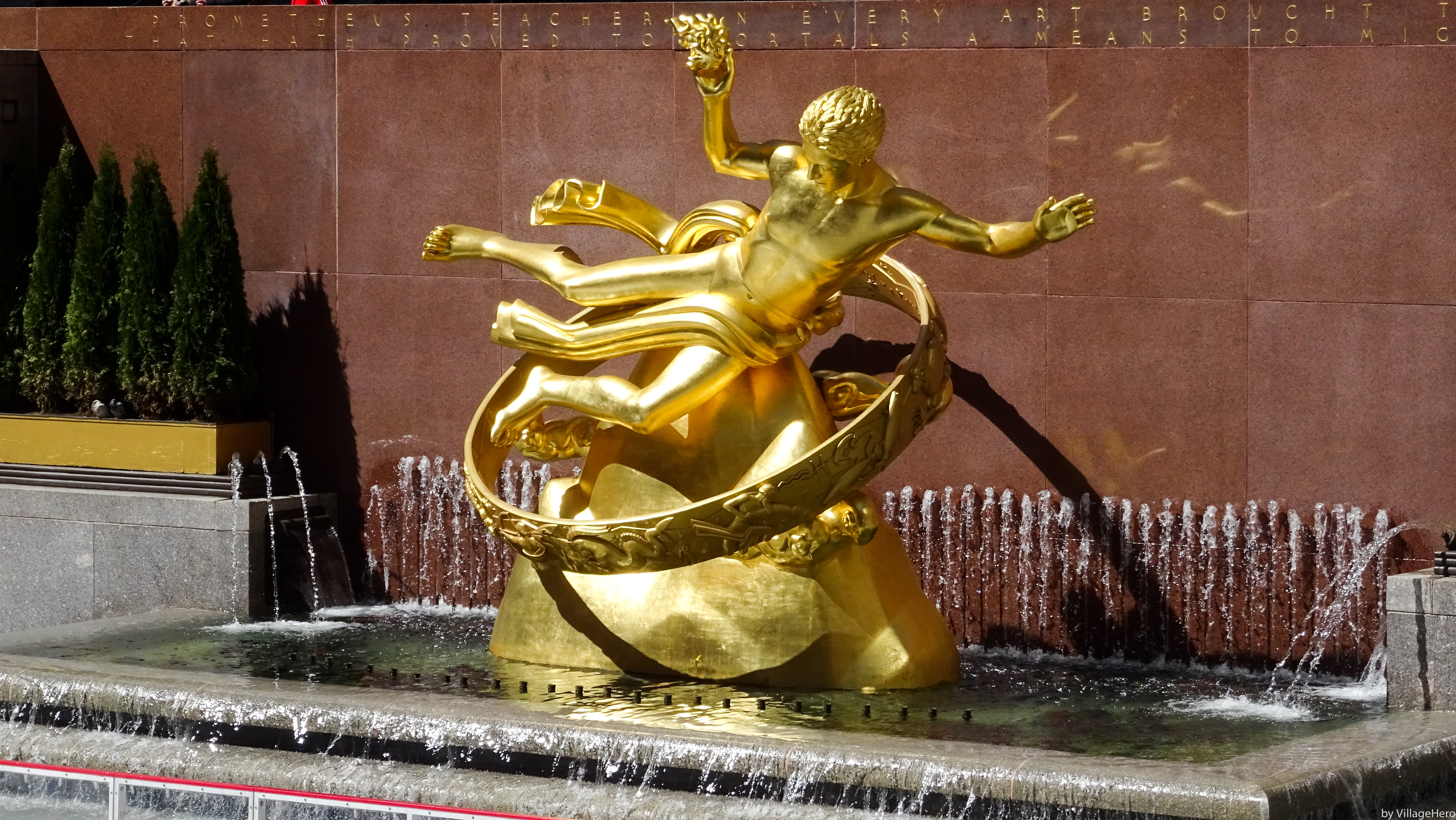
Rockefeller Center's Prometheus by Paul Manship

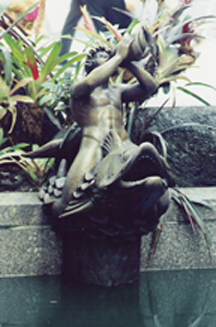
One of the promenade fountains by Rene Paul Chambellan at Rockefeller Center

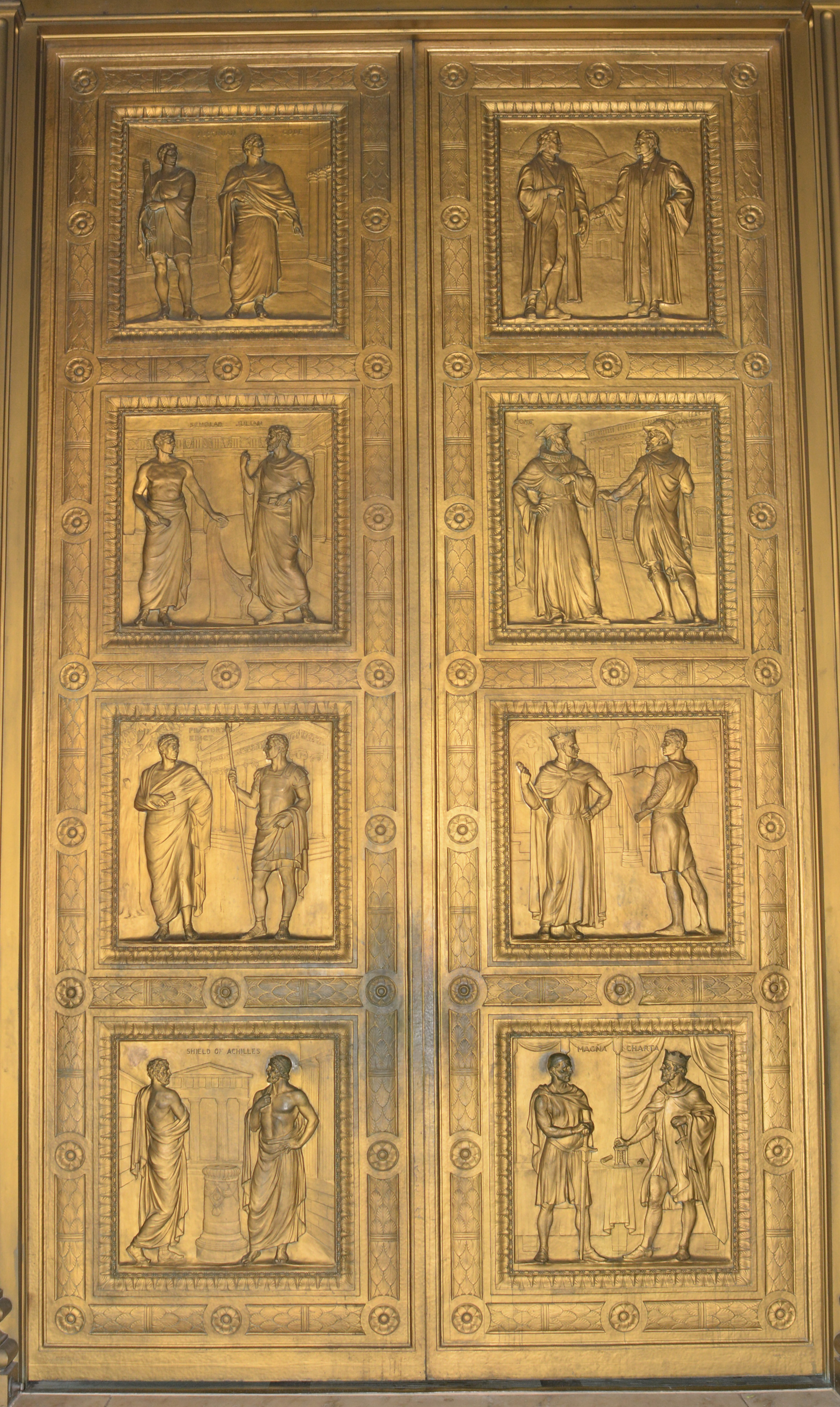
United States Supreme Court bronze doors by Gilbert Donnelly Sr., and his son John Donnelly Jr.
General Bronze Buildings

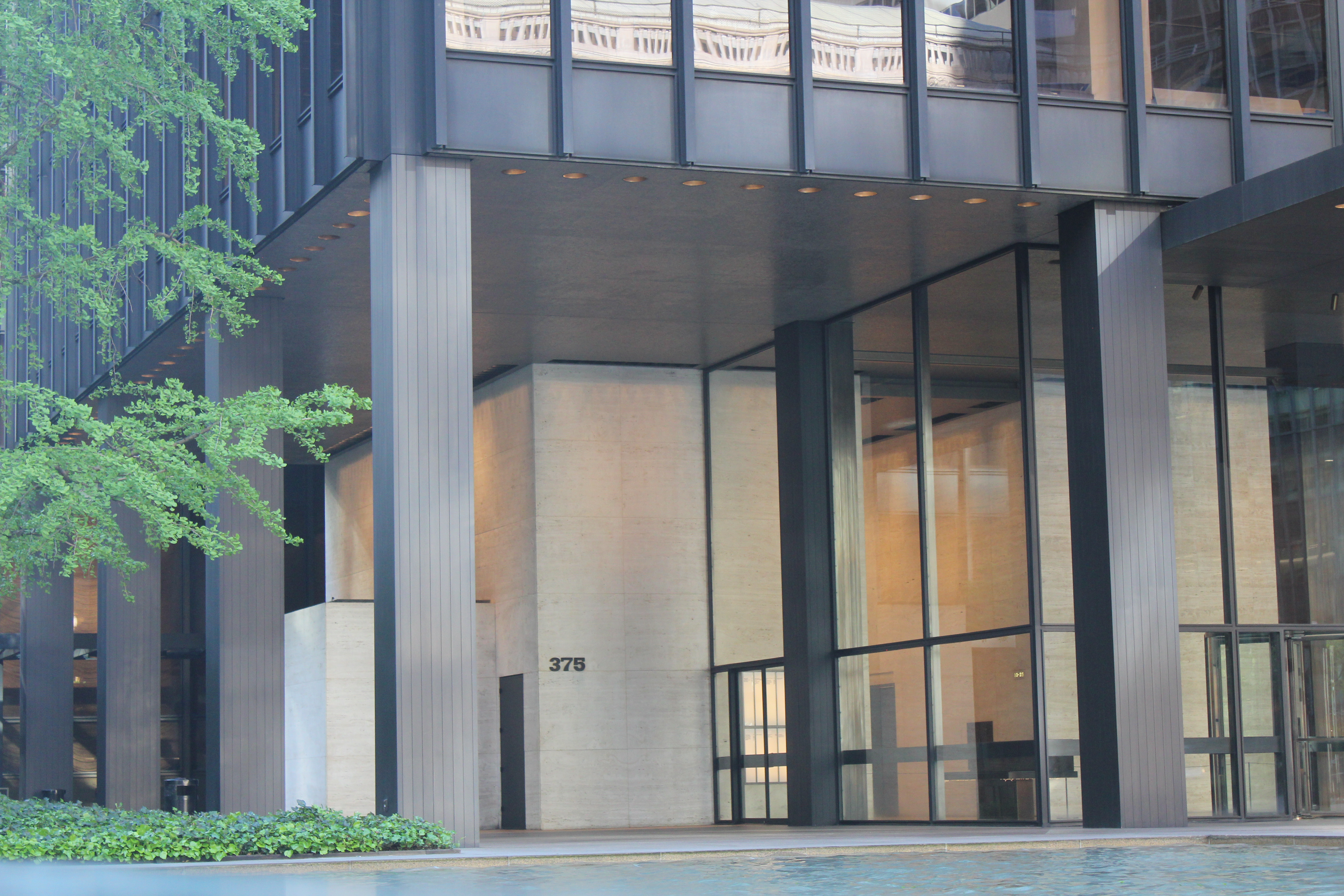
Seagram Building seen from Park Avenue

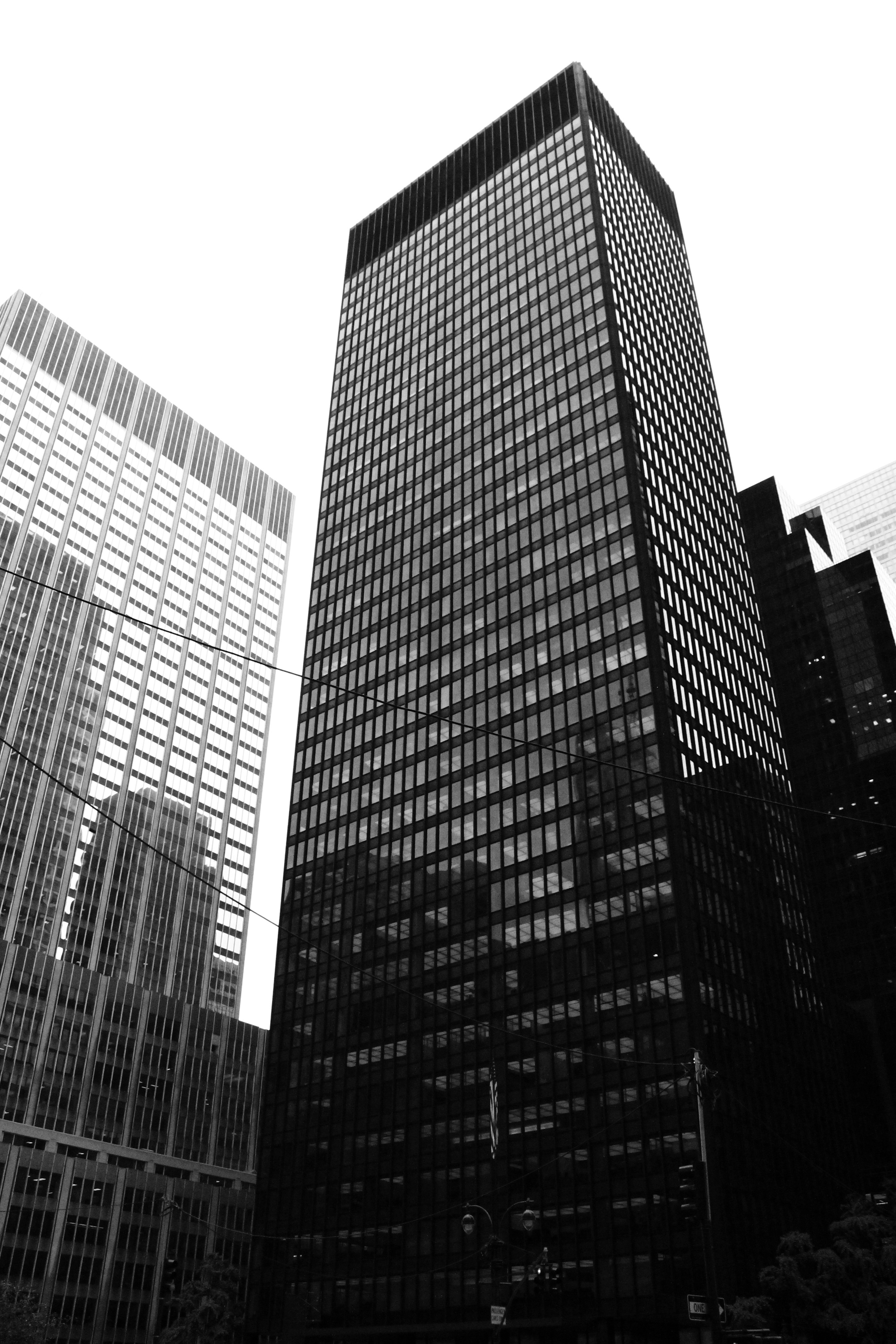
Seagram Building seen from across the street on "Park" and 52nd

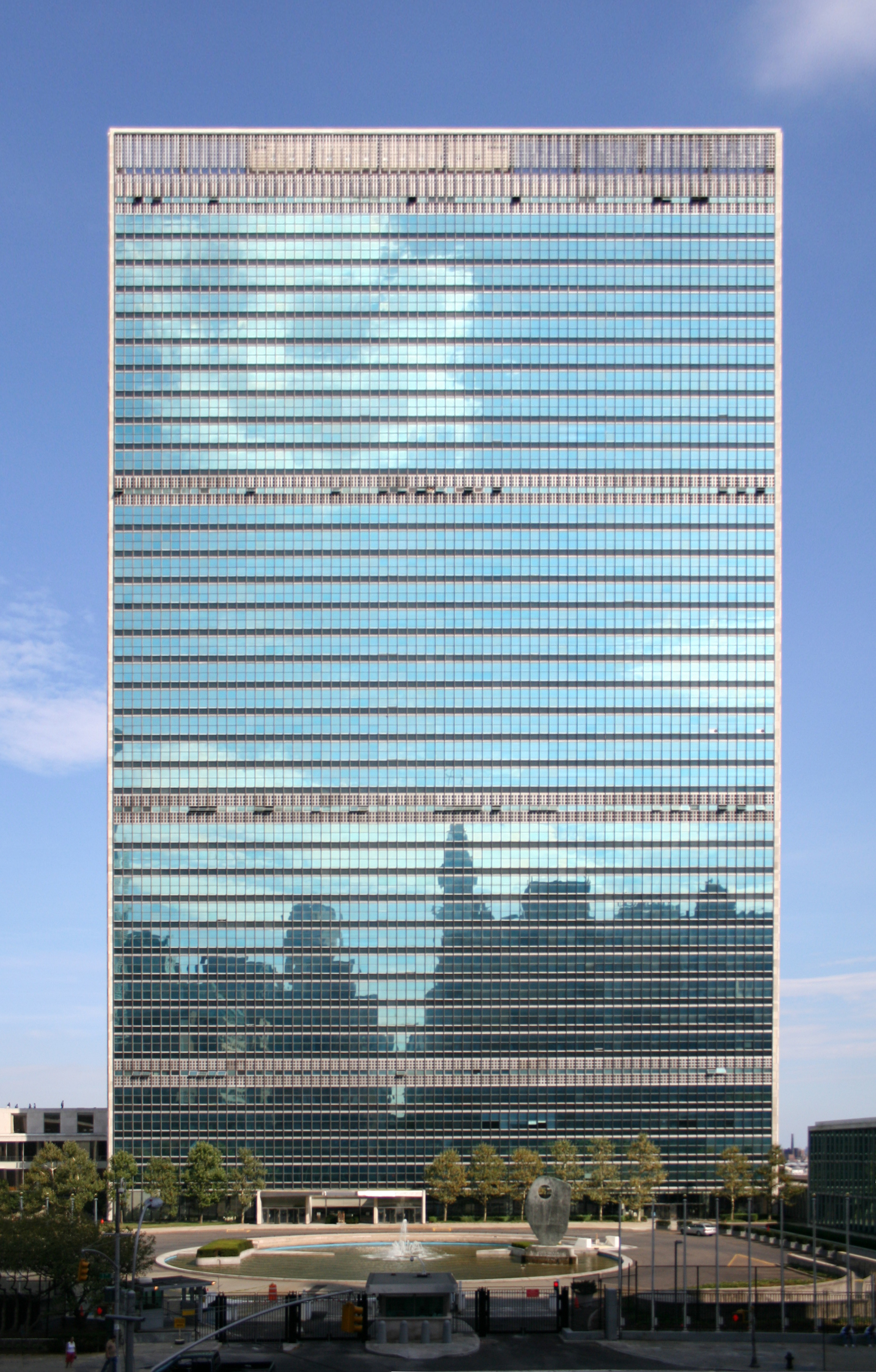
United Nations Secretariat Building, reflecting International design

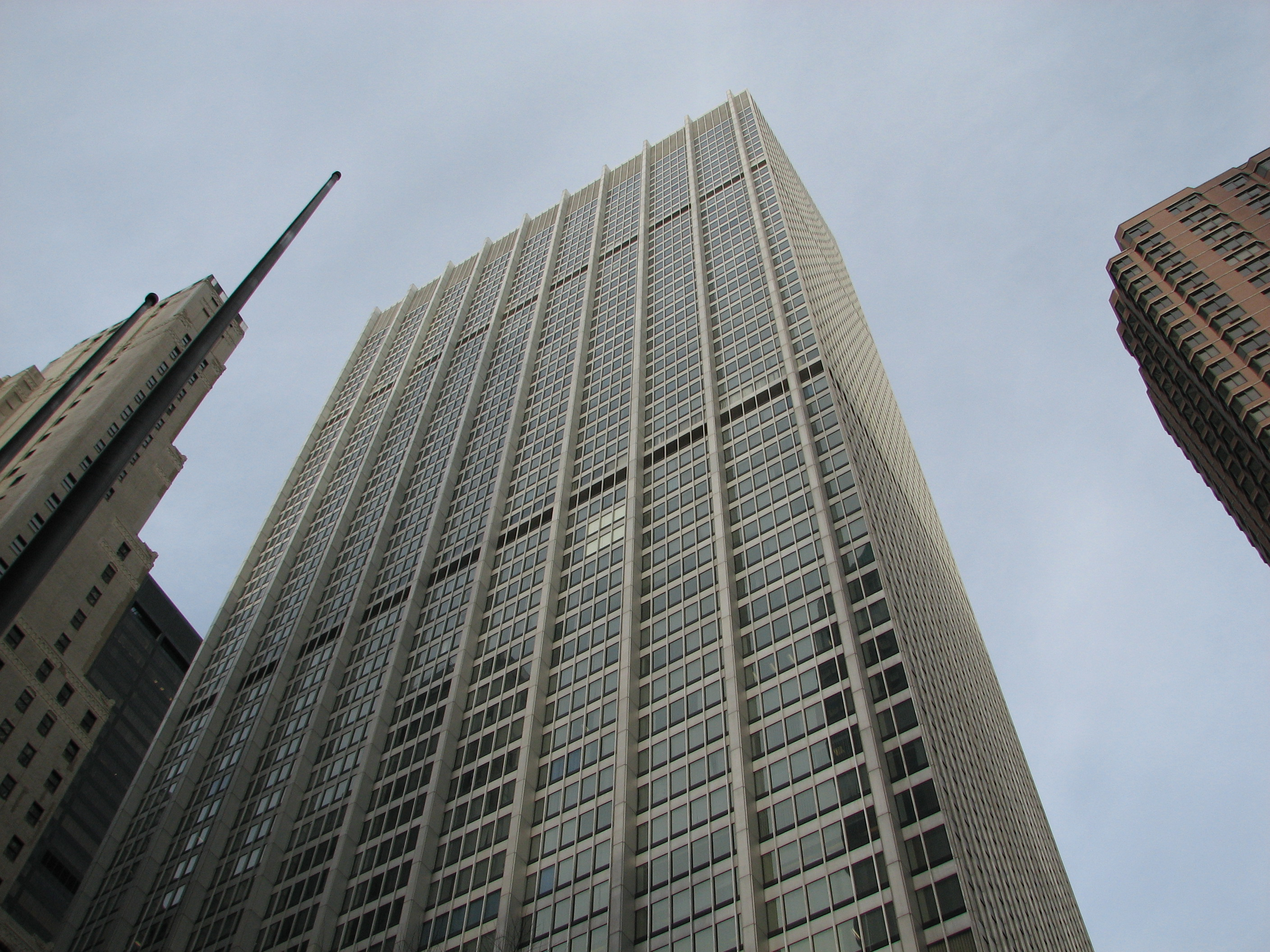
Looking up from the plaza below at David Rockefeller's Chase Manhattan Bank Building in New York City

== Death ==
John Polachek died on April 16, 1955, in New York City.

== See also ==
- Architecture of New York City
- List of cities with the most skyscrapers
- List of tallest buildings
- List of tallest buildings in the United States
