= Ray Van Cleef =

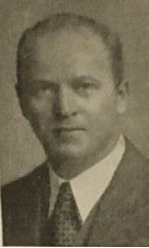
- Born: June 22, 1910
- Died: June 26, 1964 (aged 54); San Jose, California, U.S.
- Occupation(s): Artist's model, magazine editor, columnist
- Spouse: Virginia Van Cleef
- Children: 2 daughters

Raymond DeGray Van Cleef (June 22, 1910 – May 26, 1964) was an American artist's model, magazine editor, physical culturist, and columnist.

== Life ==
Van Cleef took up weightlifting in Siegmund Klein's gym.

Van Cleef was an artist's model. He was "once in demand by sculptors as a model for Grecian gods." He may have been the original small scale model for Prometheus, a sculpture designed by Paul Manship in Rockefeller Center, even though Leonardo Nole is often credited as the only model.

Van Cleef was the owner of a gym in San Jose, California. He trained the New York Giants, a baseball team in New York City. He also trained Olympic weightlifters, and he organized weightlifting competitions like the Santa Clara Valley Invitational Tournament in 1963.

Van Cleef resided in San Jose with his wife, Virginia, and their two daughters, Lois and Martha. He died of a heart attack, on May 26, 1964, at age 53, at his home in San Jose.

== Physical culture ==
Van Cleef was an associate editor at Strength & Health, for which he wrote a column called Strong Men Around the World. In his columns, he wrote about wrist-wrestling competitions and walkathons. Van Cleef was one of the few vegetarians involved in physical culture. He was supportive of the American Vegetarian Convention and in 1949 commented that the vegetarian movement needed to clean itself up by dissociating itself from cultists or those making unrealistic claims.
