= General Bronze Corporation =

American metals fabricator (1927–1967)

- Industry: Metal fabrication Metal working
- Founded: 1931; 95 years ago as General Bronze Corporation
- Founder: John Polachek
- Defunct: 1967; 59 years ago
- Fate: Acquired by Allied Products Corporation of Chicago, IL in 1967, various divisions sold or liquidated, with trademark and patent rights sold in 1967.
- Headquarters: Long Island City, New York, US
- Key people: John Polachek, Aaron Saphier, Milton Salmon, A. Walter Nelson, Warren Freeman
- Products: Metal fabrication Metalworking; Beams; Girders; Antennas; Aluminum windows Bronze; TV station equipment: TV broadcast antennas
- Divisions: Brach Manufacturing Company of Newark, New Jersey, Roman Bronze Works

The General Bronze Corporation (also known as General Bronze or GBC) was an American metals fabricator, primarily of bronze and aluminum, and the most recognized company in the architectural bronze and aluminum industry during the first half of the 20th century. It was known for New York City's Seagram Building on Park Avenue designed by Mies van der Rohe, the Atlas and Prometheus bronze sculptures in Rockefeller Center, the bronze doors for the United States Supreme Court, Commerce, and Department of Justice Buildings in Washington, DC, the aluminum windows for the United Nations Secretariat Building and Chase Manhattan Bank Building, and for the design of the Arecibo Radio Telescope suspension system. As American cities evolved, the need for architectural and sculptural bronze increased. An innovative and progressive company, General Bronze Corporation stepped up to supply that demand. It became the dominant leader in the architectural bronze industry for both bronze fabrication and bronze sculpture, and aluminum fabrication in the United States for over three decades. In the early 1950s, General Bronze was also at the forefront of the fledgling television radio industry as a major manufacturer of radio antennas, and one of the first to introduce automatic motorized antennas for the automobile industry. General Bronze's Brach Manufacturing subdivision offered electronics to the early radio telescope field, such as the Green Bank Telescope of the National Radio Astronomy Observatory in Green Bank, West Virginia and the Arecibo Radio Telescope.

Overextending their resources by diverting capital from bronze manufacturing to antenna and radio telescope research, concomitant with the declining use of bronze in the construction industry due to changes in architectural style, eclipsed General Bronze's main focus leading to their ultimate demise. In 1967, they were acquired by Allied Products of Chicago, IL, and ceased to exist.

== History and establishment ==
General Bronze Corporation was founded as a reorganization of the John Polachek Bronze and Iron Company, founded in 1910 by John Polachek, a Hungarian immigrant. He became a supervisor overseeing bronze manufacturing at the Tiffany Glass Studios in Corona, Queens New York, which served as the basis for his future enterprise in bronze fabrication.

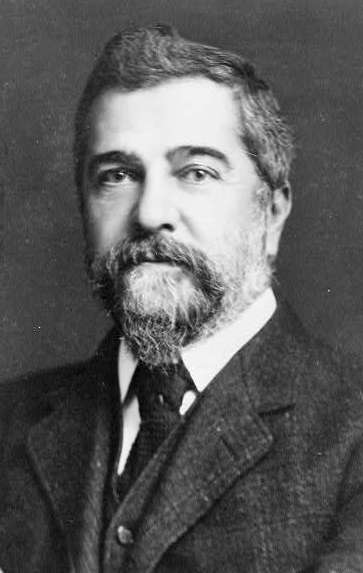
Louis C. Tiffany

Tiffany Glass Studios, made famous by Louis C. Tiffany commonly referred to his product as favrile glass or "Tiffany glass," and used bronze in their artisan work for his Tiffany lamps. In 1910, Polachek left Tiffany Glass Studios and opened his own bronze architectural company called the John Polachek Bronze Company. In 1912 he purchased a 1.75-acre site in Long Island City, Queens at 34–19 Tenth Street and grew it into one of the most important bronze fabricators in the field. In 1927, Polachek merged his new company with another metals fabricator, the Renaissance Bronze and Iron Works located in Long Island City, Queens. The new company became known as the General Bronze Corporation. In 1934, General Bronze Corporation was the largest company in the architectural bronze industry in the United States, employing a combined total of 1,200 workers from General Bronze, Renaissance Bronze and Iron Works, and Tiffany Studios with assets over $5 million.

Polachek's grand idea was to become the leader in the use of bronze for metal fabrication as he foresaw the worldwide demand for the metal alloy would only increase. This was due to a rise in the use of bronze in the architectural and art world, and Polachek leaped at the opportunity. The sought-after metal coincided with the timing of the Art Deco, Art Nouveau, and international art movements, in which it became popular to use bronze. Polachek's intuition paid off, as he cornered the bronze fabrication market. Bronze and aluminum became popular to use and were implemented in art, architecture, and the construction industry by artists, architects, and construction companies respectively. As General Bronze gained notoriety, the company quickly became the forerunner. General Bronze's most acclaimed entry to the construction industry was the bronze mullion I-beams for the Seagram Building, the no-set-back windows clad in aluminum for the United Nations Secretariat Building, and the Chase Manhattan Bank Building.

The company purchased the Brach Manufacturing Company of Newark, New Jersey, as one of its subsidiaries in the 1950s. General Bronze (GBC) intended to become a pioneer in the development of TV antennas. During this period, GBC was closely identified with the leadership of Aaron Saphier. He became general manager after the company's founding, and served as president from 1931 to 1959, remaining active as chairman of the board until the end of 1960.

During the 1930s through 1950s, the General Bronze Corporation's leadership as one of America's leaders in metals and especially the architectural bronze industry began to weaken as General Bronze expanded beyond their main focus with their developing interest in marketing consumer communications with antennas, as well as aluminum-manufactured products. As General Bronze began to face increasing domestic competition from international electronics firms like RCA, Sony, Philips, Matsushita and Mitsubishi, they continued primarily manufacturing aluminum windows, that which they were known for on prior construction projects, such as the Tripler Army Base Hospital in Hawaii. Although General Bronze's division for manufacturing aluminum windows for the American construction industry climbed after World War II, they suffered enormous financial losses and other failed projects including the loss of existing contracts with metal fabrication partners. This occurred simultaneously with the waning use of architectural bronze and the failed attempts to secure a bid for both the Arecibo Radio Telescope and the Green Bank Telescope in Green Bank, WV. The company slowly rebounded by the early 1960s, but never regained its former status. General Bronze was eventually acquired by Allied Products Corporation of Chicago in 1967, a company which was once owned by Jay Pritzker, the uncle of present Illinois governor JB Pritzker.

== General Bronze Subsidiaries ==
=== Bronze art ===
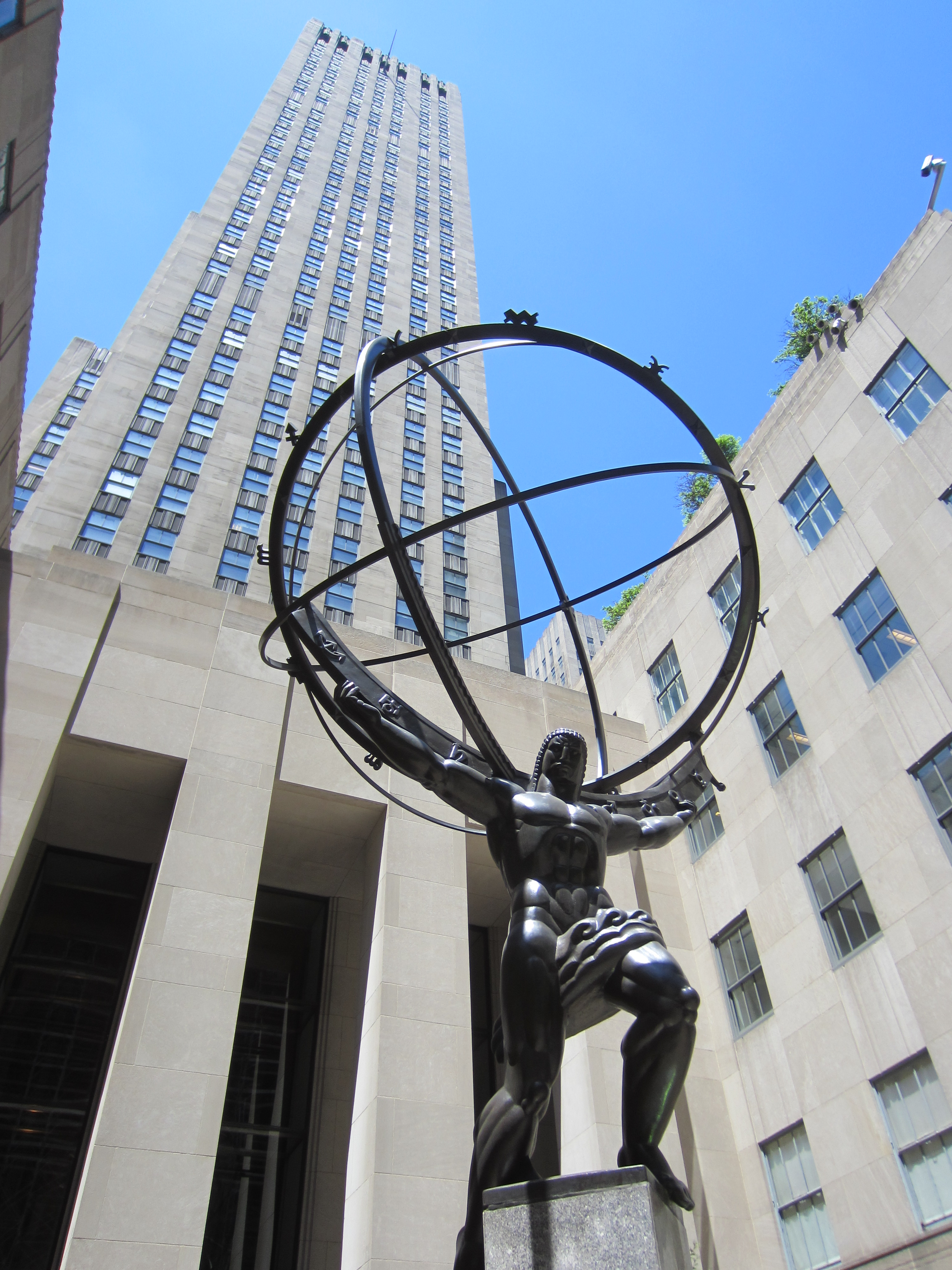
Atlas in the International Building's plaza

The General Bronze Corporation, with the acquisition of the Roman Bronze Works, became the primary company behind many of America's buildings and sculptures. Early man has used bronze throughout history. In the ancient Mayan, Egyptian, Greek, and Roman ruins, bronze tools, instruments, statues, and weapons has always been found in an almost perfect state of preservation. "Centuries hence there will undoubtedly be many fine works of bronze that will bear eloquent testimony to craftsmanship of our day."

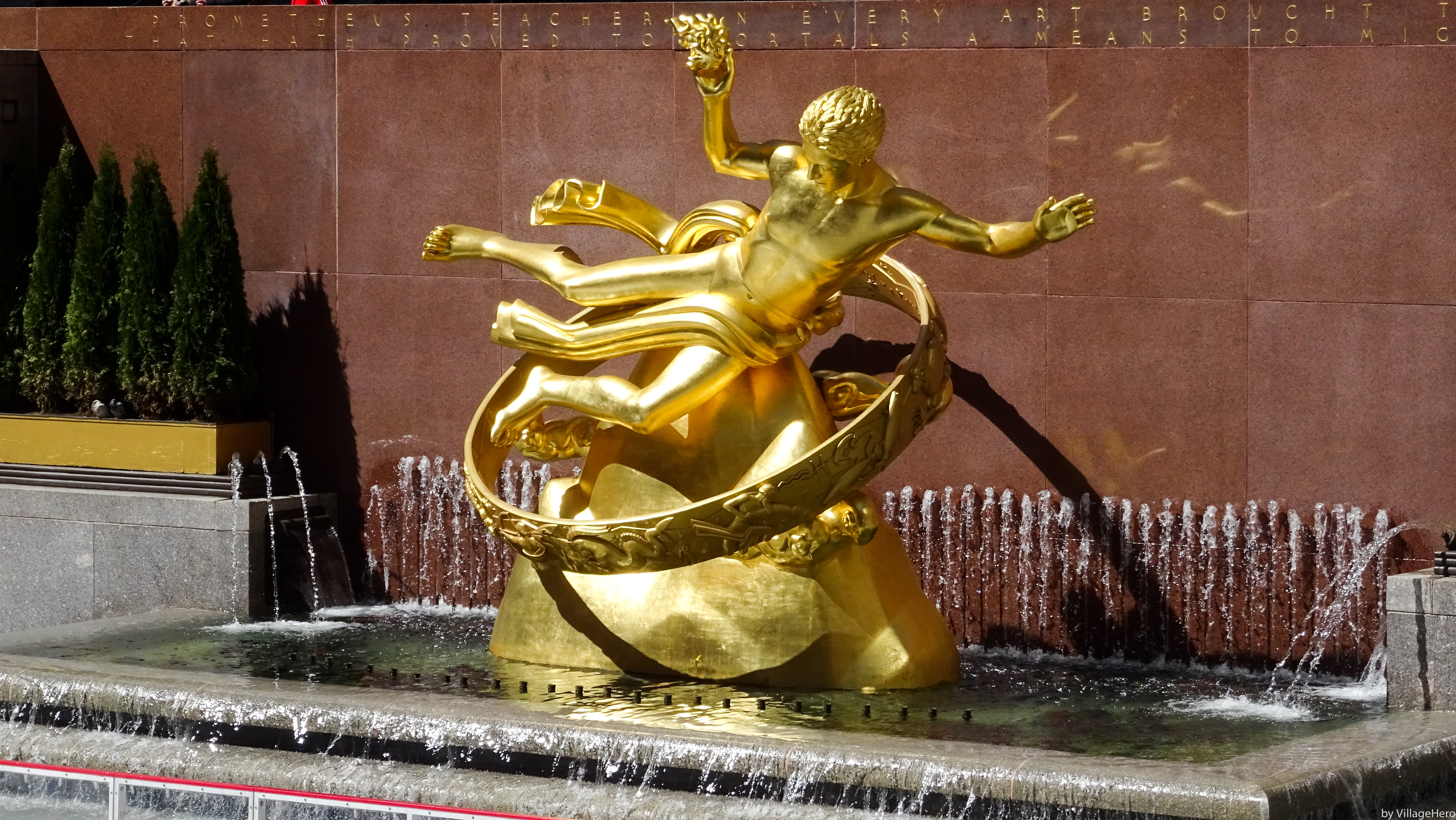
Prometheus (1934)

Visitors to Rockefeller Center have admired the bronze statuary such as the art deco Atlas by Lee Lawrie, and the Prometheus by Paul Manship." Other Rockefeller Center sculptures admired worldwide are on display. These include the fountain figures by Rene Chambellan adorning the fountain flanking Manship's Prometheus statue; Lawrie's Atlas sculpture in the plaza of Rockefeller Center's International Building at its 5th Avenue entrance; and the aluminum "Spirit of the Dance" of William Zorach at Rockefeller Center's Radio City Music Hall, New York.

=== Roman Bronze Works ===
The General Bronze Corporation became the leader of the most famous bronze sculptures of the 20th Century, most notably after its acquisition of the Roman Bronze Works. The Roman Bronze Works "had seen many of America's greatest sculptors." The General Bronze Corporation purchased the Roman Bronze Works in 1928. This ownership lasted for twenty years, up until 1948. General Bronze's newly purchased foundry produced “virtually all of the sculpture for Rockefeller Center, numerous national monuments, and many sculptures for the W.P.A, in addition to its usual complement of private commissions." The Roman Bronze works excelled in the lost-wax casting method and permitted large works to be cast in one piece. Most of the sculptures at Rockefeller Center, like the statues of Prometheus and Atlas, were cast at the Corona, Queens building.

== Gallery ==
Manship, Chambellan & Lawrie Sculptures

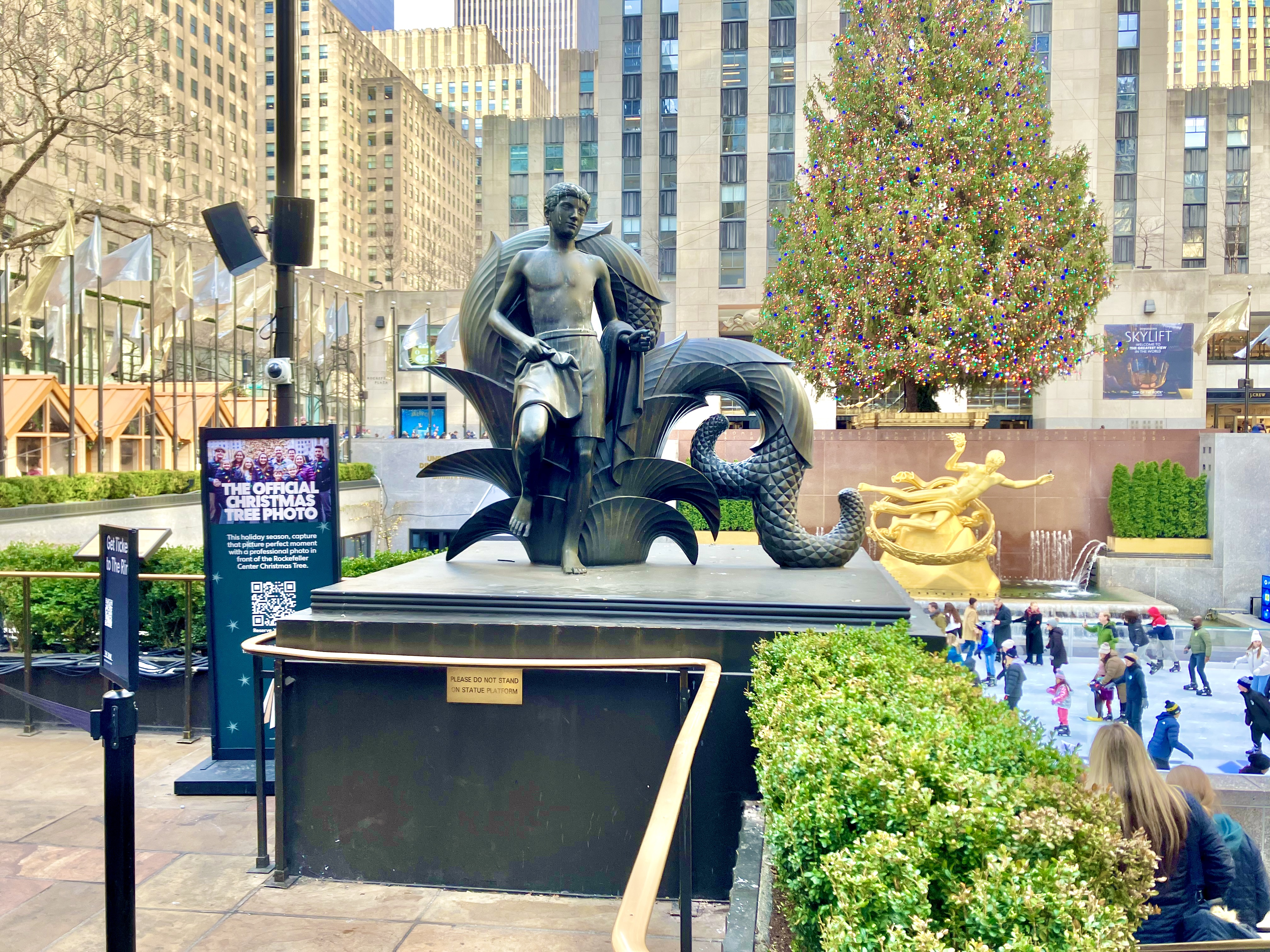
"Youth" bronze sculpture by Paul Manship, on the left top of the stairs leading down to the ice skating rink, designed by Manship to "announce" Prometheus.

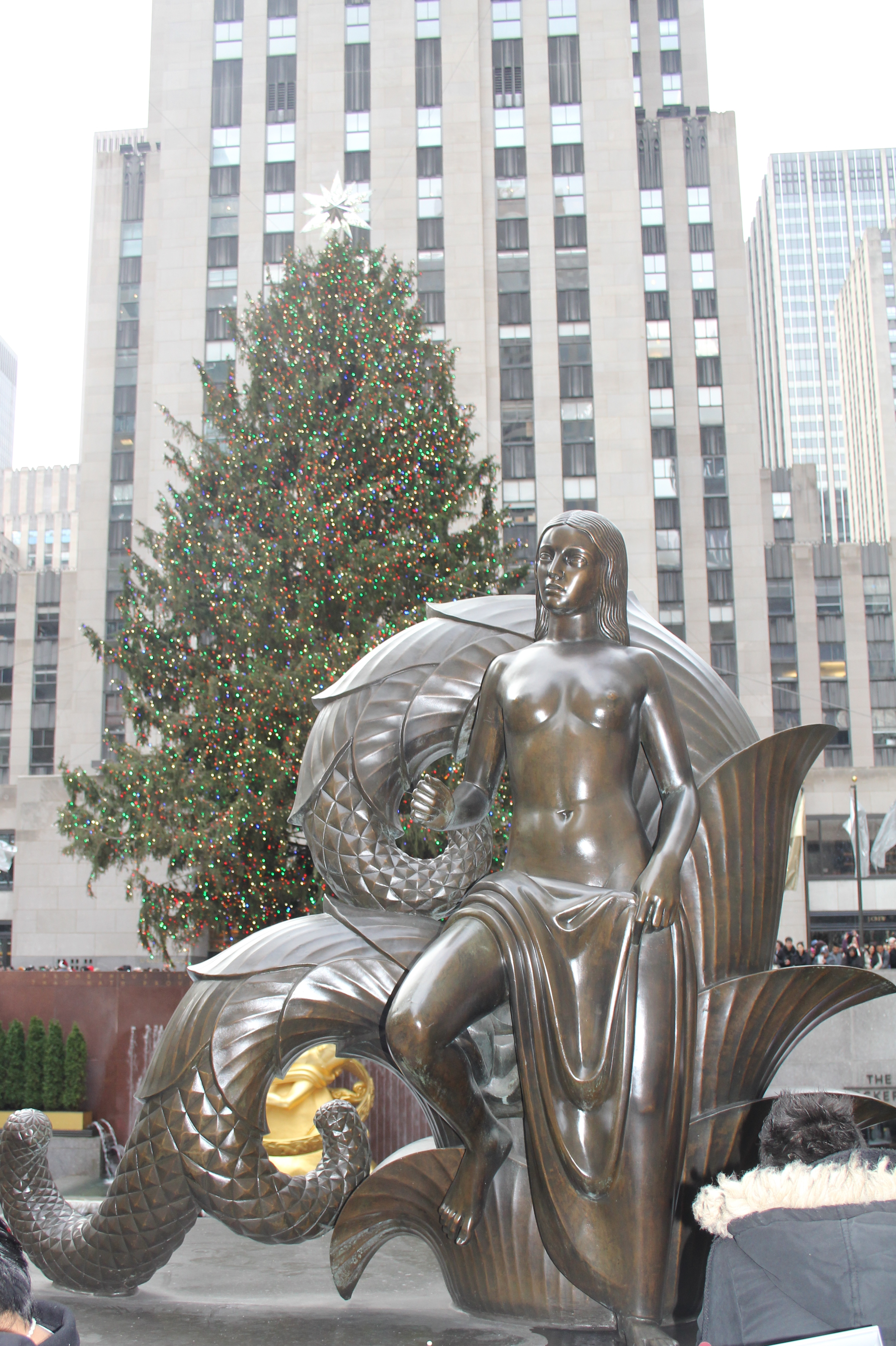
Paul Manship "Maiden" flanks right side of staircase.

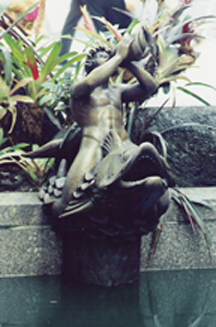
A promenade fountain by Rene Paul Chambellan at Rockefeller Center.

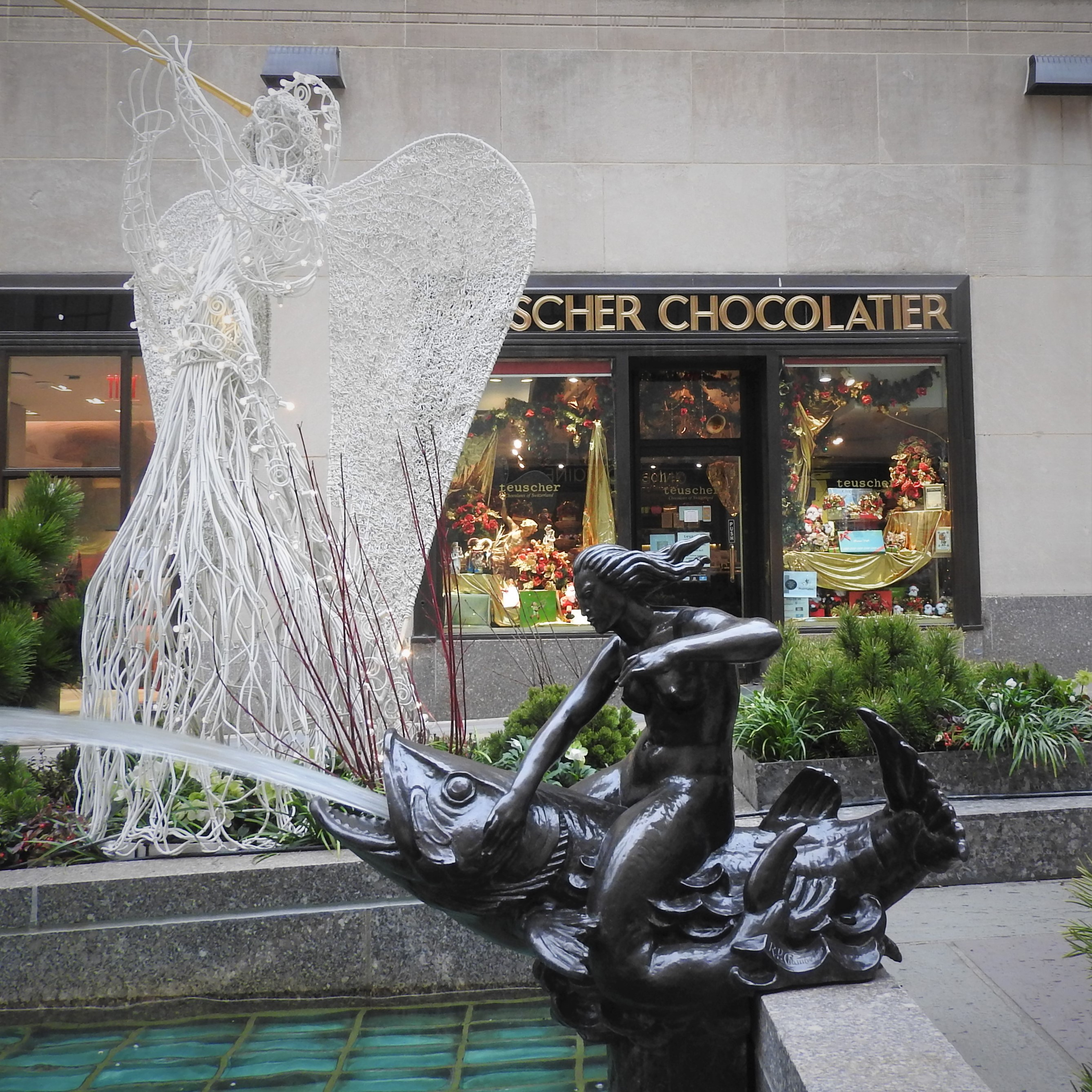
Nereid by Chambellan

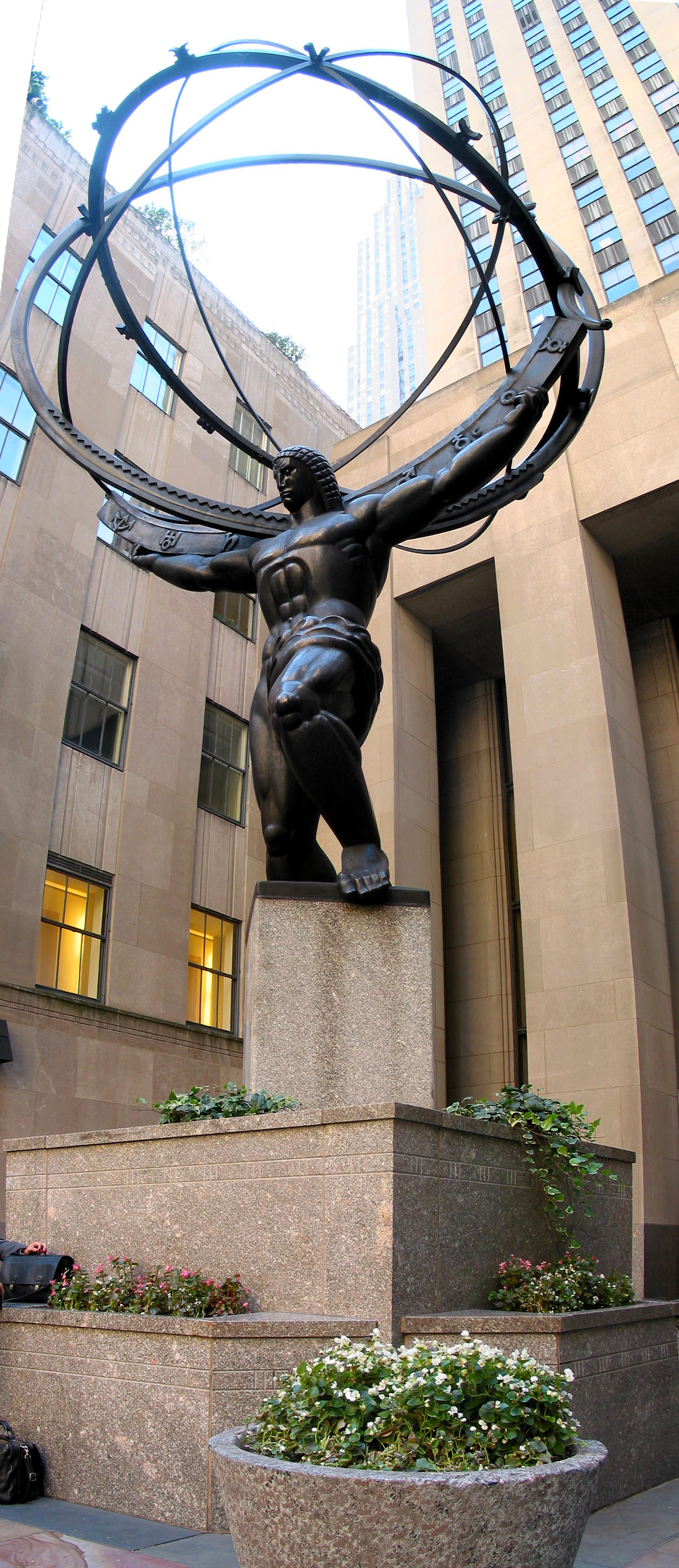
Atlas

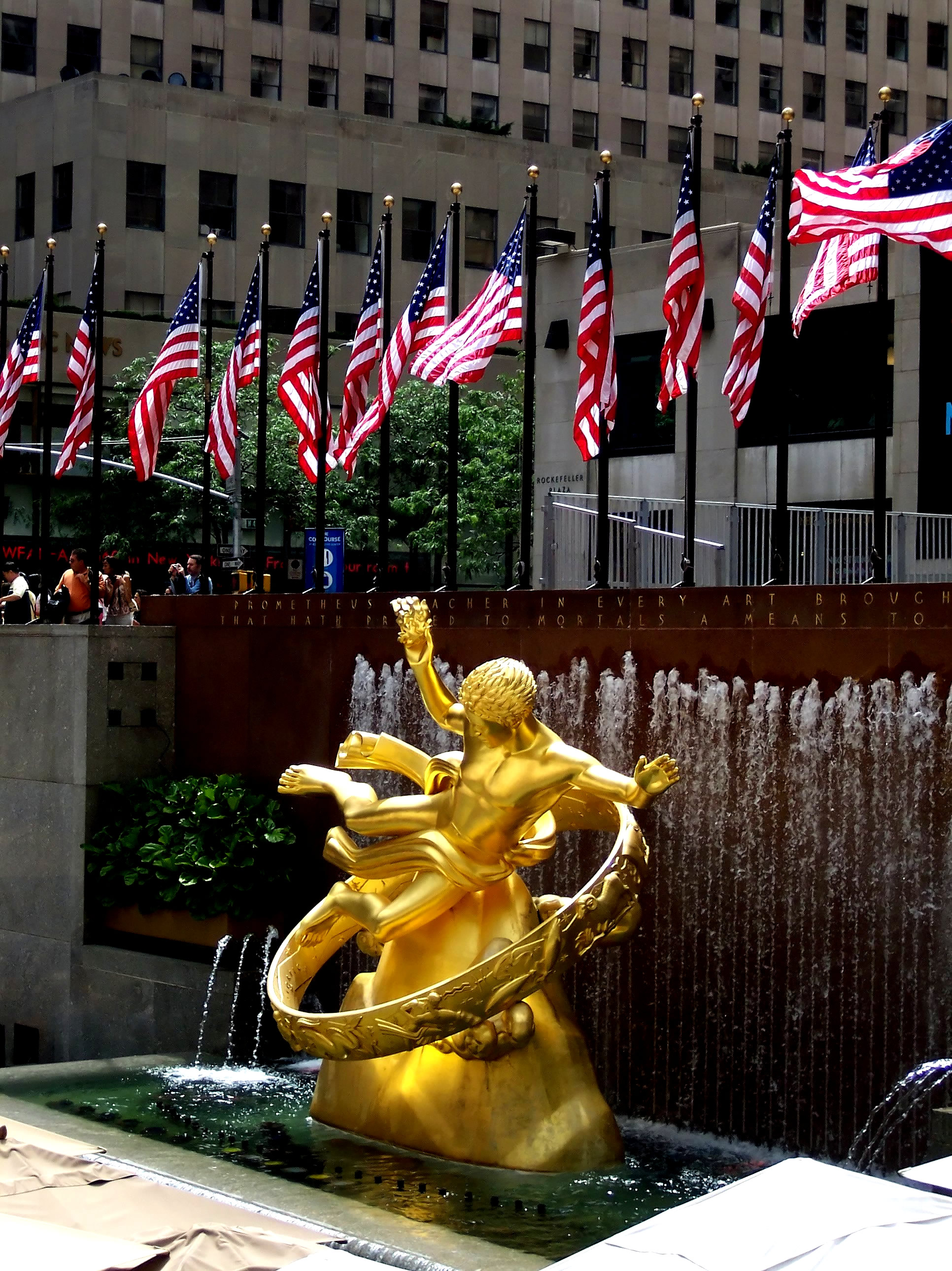
Prometheus, Rockefeller Center NYC

Early on, the Roman Bronze Works’ use of the lost-wax casting technique, was eyed by Polachek as he once worked there. Begun in 1899 by Riccardo Bertelli, an immigrant who attained technical knowledge of European methods of casting bronze in wax from his native Genoa, Italy, flourished under his management while casting primarily art sculpture. In 1928, the prized foundry was purchased by John Polachek of General Bronze, not only for its workers and workmanship but for the sizable physical plant in Corona, Queens. It was then purchased by General Bronze Corporation and became a subsidiary. Under General Bronze's leadership, Roman Bronze Works produced America's finest patriotic monuments, statues, and most ornate public doors. The factory was the old Tiffany Studios in Corona, Queens, at the southwest corner of 43rd Avenue and 97th place, where it was used to cast art sculptures of bronze designs for sculptors, and bronze architectural elements such as floor registers, door jambs, window casings, lamps, and sconces, most notably for Tiffany.

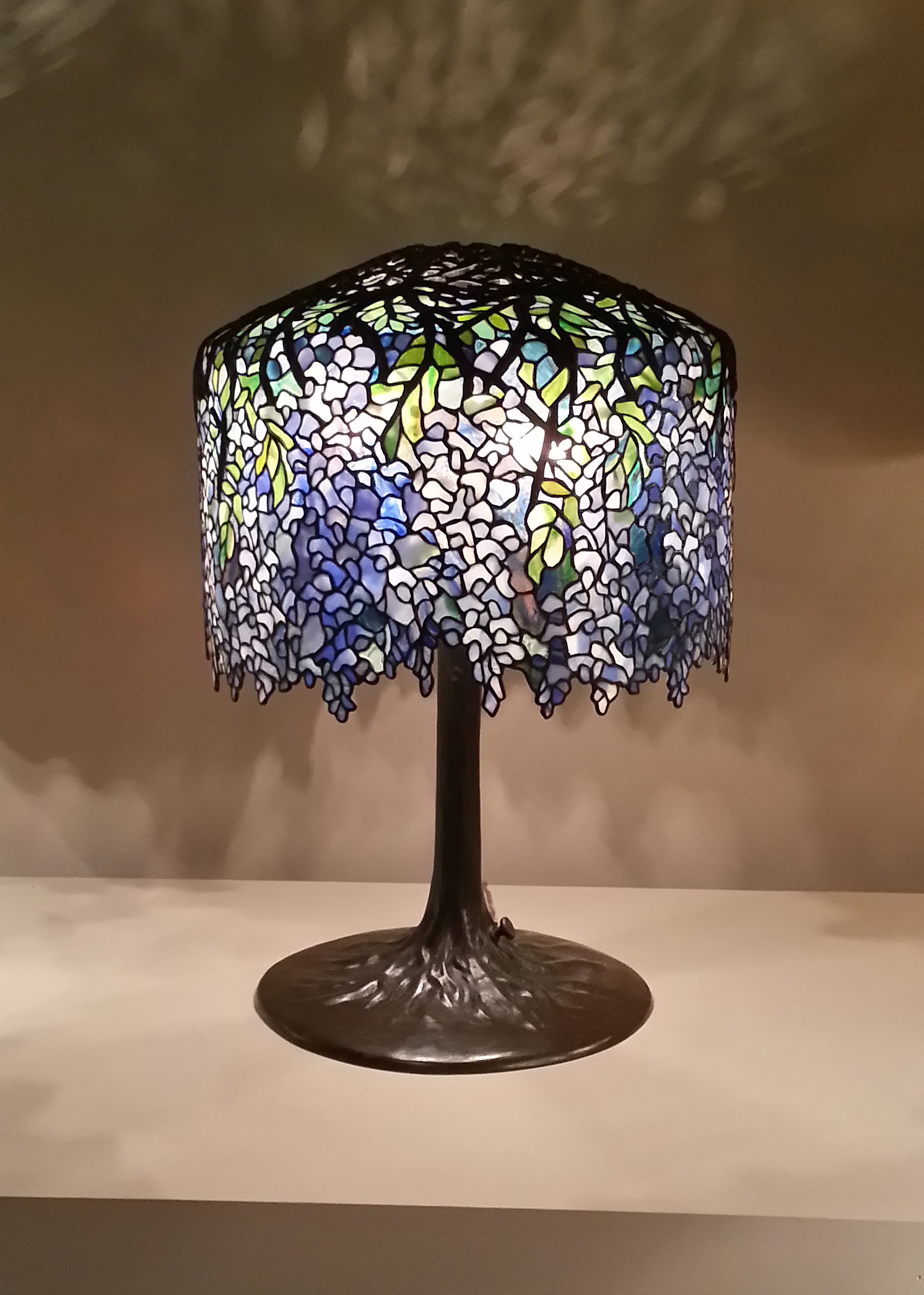
Tiffany's Wisteria table lamp with bronze base

The building had undergone a metamorphosis of name changes, beginning with the Tiffany Glass and Decorating Company, in 1892. Arthur J. Nash, apparently became Tiffany's partner, as Nash applied the favrile glass technique learned from his hometown of Stourbridge, England to the glassworks produced by Tiffany. Thereafter, its name evolved from being called the Stourbridge Glass Company in 1893 (in deference to the technique learned from Nash's hometown), to the Tiffany Glass Furnaces, and finally to the Tiffany Studios. Stourbridge Glass Company was absorbed by Tiffany into the Tiffany Furnaces in 1902. "Within this complex, Tiffany carried out experiments in glass colors and pottery glazing, perfected techniques of assembling stained glass windows." “By 1901, Tiffany was at the peak of his profession. But Tiffany's glass fell out of favor in the 1910s, and by the 1920s a foundry had been installed for a separate bronze company. In 1932 Tiffany Studios filed for bankruptcy. Ownership of the complex passed back to the Roman Bronze Works, which had served as a subcontractor to Tiffany in prior years.” In 1948, General Bronze relinquished ownership of the Roman Bronze Works foundry and was brought back under family control rather than remaining corporate. General Bronze Corporation sold off the subsidiary to a family member of a prior employee of the Roman Bronze Works to the Schiavo family, who had once been employed by Roman Bronze Works.

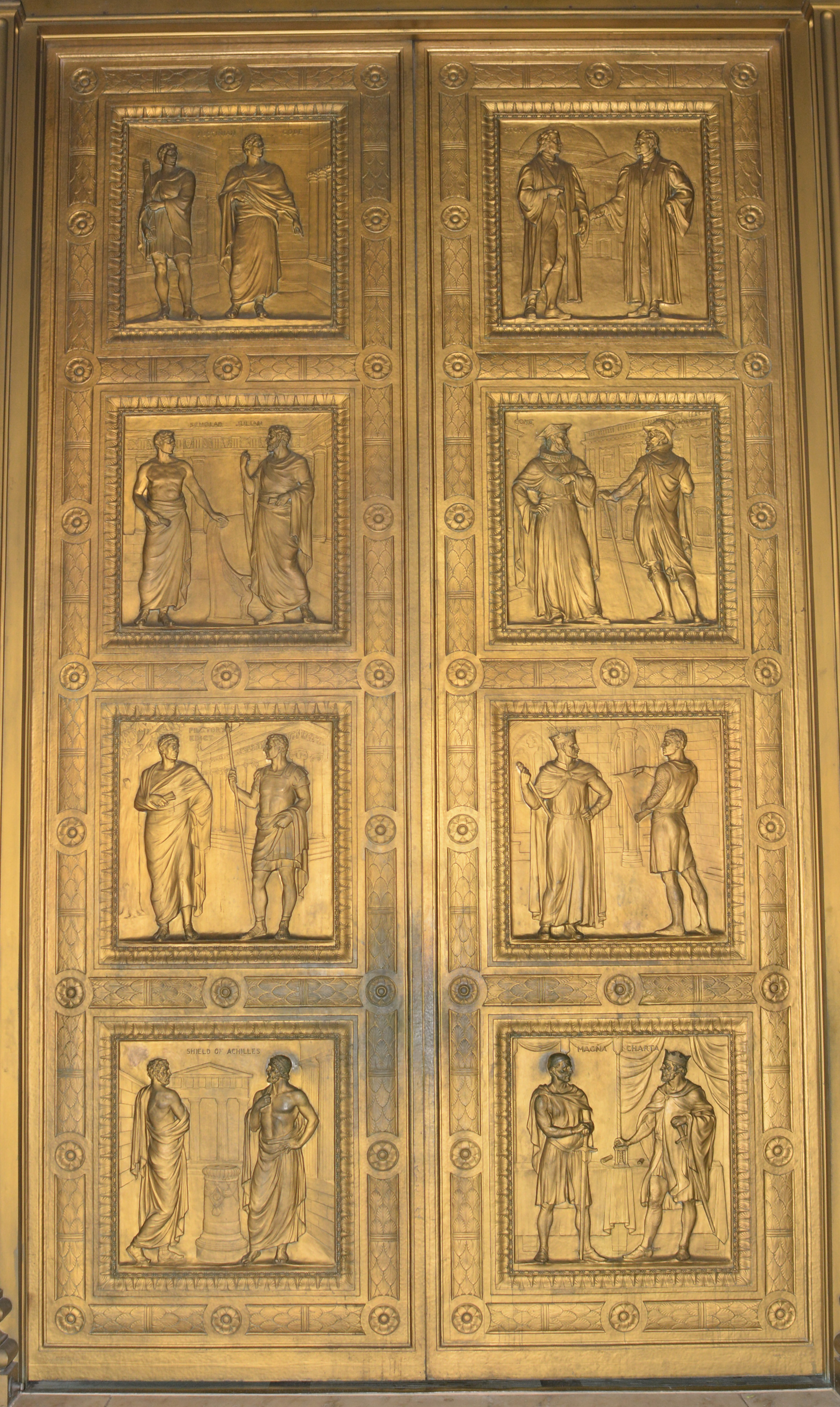
US Supreme Court Building's massive bronze doors by Gilbert Donnelly, Sr., and his son John Donnelly, Jr.

The largest and most ornate bronze fountain known to be cast in the world was by the Roman Bronze Works and General Bronze Corporation in 1952. The material used for the fountain, known as statuary bronze, is a quaternary alloy made of copper, zinc, tin, and lead, and traditionally golden brown in color. This was made for the Andrew W. Mellon Memorial in Federal Triangle in Washington, DC. Another example of the massive, ornate design projects attributed to General Bronze/Roman Bronze Works were the massive doors to the United States Supreme Court Building in Washington, DC.

== Architectural Bronze and Metals ==
When the United States entered World War II in December 1941, the federal government required metal for use in the war effort. General Bronze Corporation began assisting in the manufacture of weapons, such as machine gun emplacements. General Bronze became a major manufacturer to the American war effort. Upon its founding, General Bronze Corporation was one of the largest metal fabricators in New York City.

=== Seagram Building ===
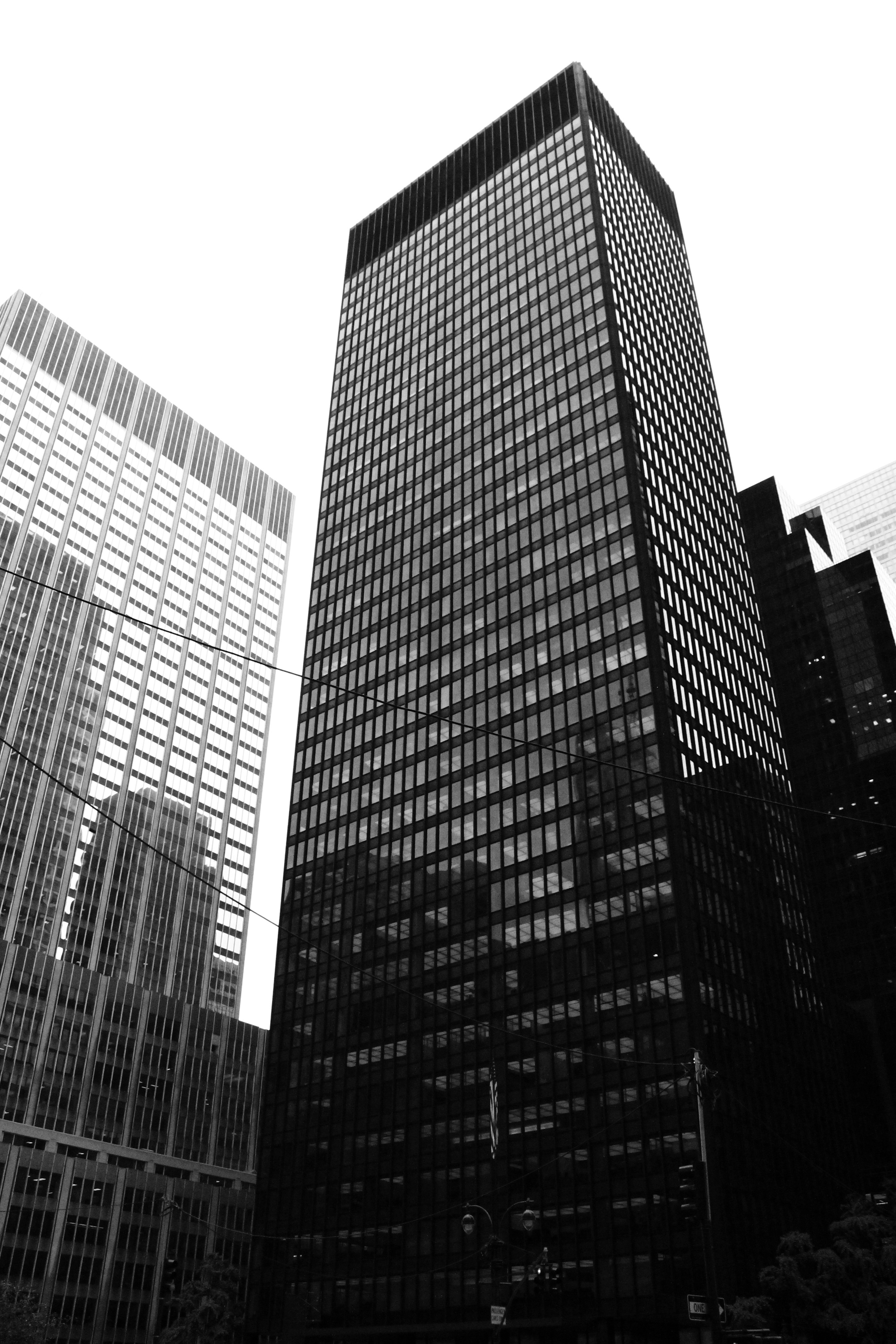
The Seagram Building viewed from across Park Avenue at 52nd Street

The Seagram Building on New York City's Park Avenue remains the "iconic glass box sheathed in bronze, designed by Mies van der Rohe." To supply the demand for bronze required for the construction, the General Bronze Corporation fabricated 3,200,000 pounds (1,600 tons) at its plant in Garden City, New York.

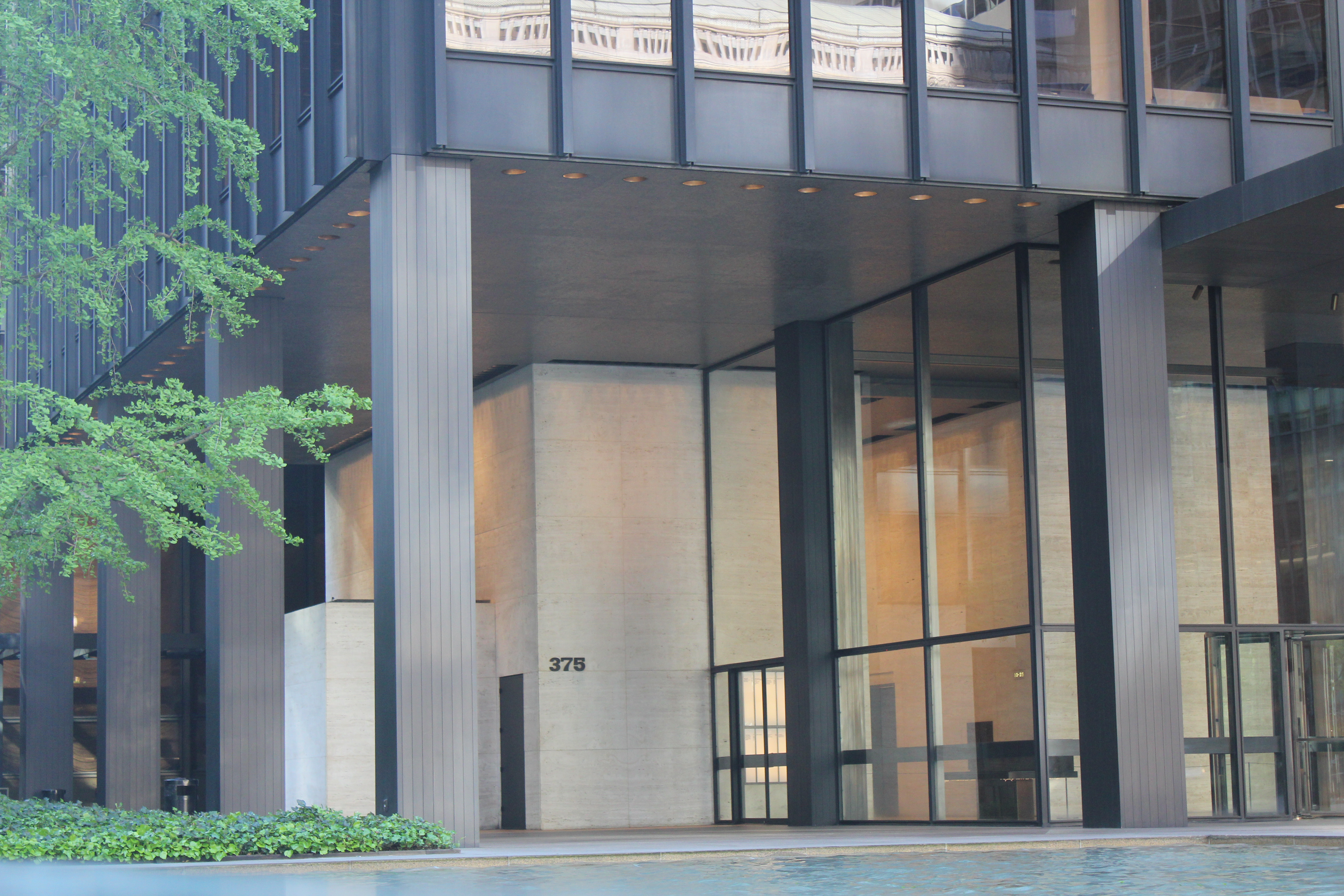
Seagram Building's columns and bays at the lobby's northwestern corner

The building "exuded transparency, as an expression of Mies van der Rohe's near-mystic faith in structure as the foundation of architecture." The Seagram Building is a 38-story, 516-foot bronze-and-topaz-tinted glass slab, in the purest expression of Mies van der Rohe style, where 27-foot bays or recessed areas offer the eye a perfect Cartesian grid. The building looks like a "squarish 38-story tower clad in a restrained curtain wall of metal and glass." Structural columns form bays that are divided by "extruded bronze-covered I-beam mullions, which run the entire length of the façade." The most interesting fact about the Seagram Building is that it was the first time that an entire building was sheathed in bronze. Another interesting fact was that New York City's zoning laws were reconfigured for the Seagram Building, so that setbacks were no longer required. "This proved to be a no-setback building but a building all set back," since the entire building was set back 100 feet from Park Avenue. "Bronze was selected because of its color, both before and after aging, its corrosion resistance, and its extrusion properties." The extrusion process, where malleable metal is "forced through dies by pressure produced the bronze mullions — vertical lines between windows," set the Seagram Building apart from all other buildings worldwide. The effect Mies van der Rohe obtained was the "sharp edges" between the glass and the bronze. "One is as much aware of the metal as of the glass that forms most of the building's walls." This produced the desired design by Mies van der Rohe. It was not only the most expensive building of its time — $36 million — but it was the first building in the world with floor-to-ceiling glass walls. Mies van der Rohe achieved the crips edges that were custom-made with specific detailing by General Bronze and "even the screws that hold in the fixed glass-plate windows are made of brass." William Jordy, an acclaimed architectural historian, said that the Seagram Building was "the first metal-and-glass skyscraper consciously designed to age as masonry buildings age—as appropriate for Seagram's whisky, as sheen to Lever's soap."

=== United Nations Secretariat Building ===
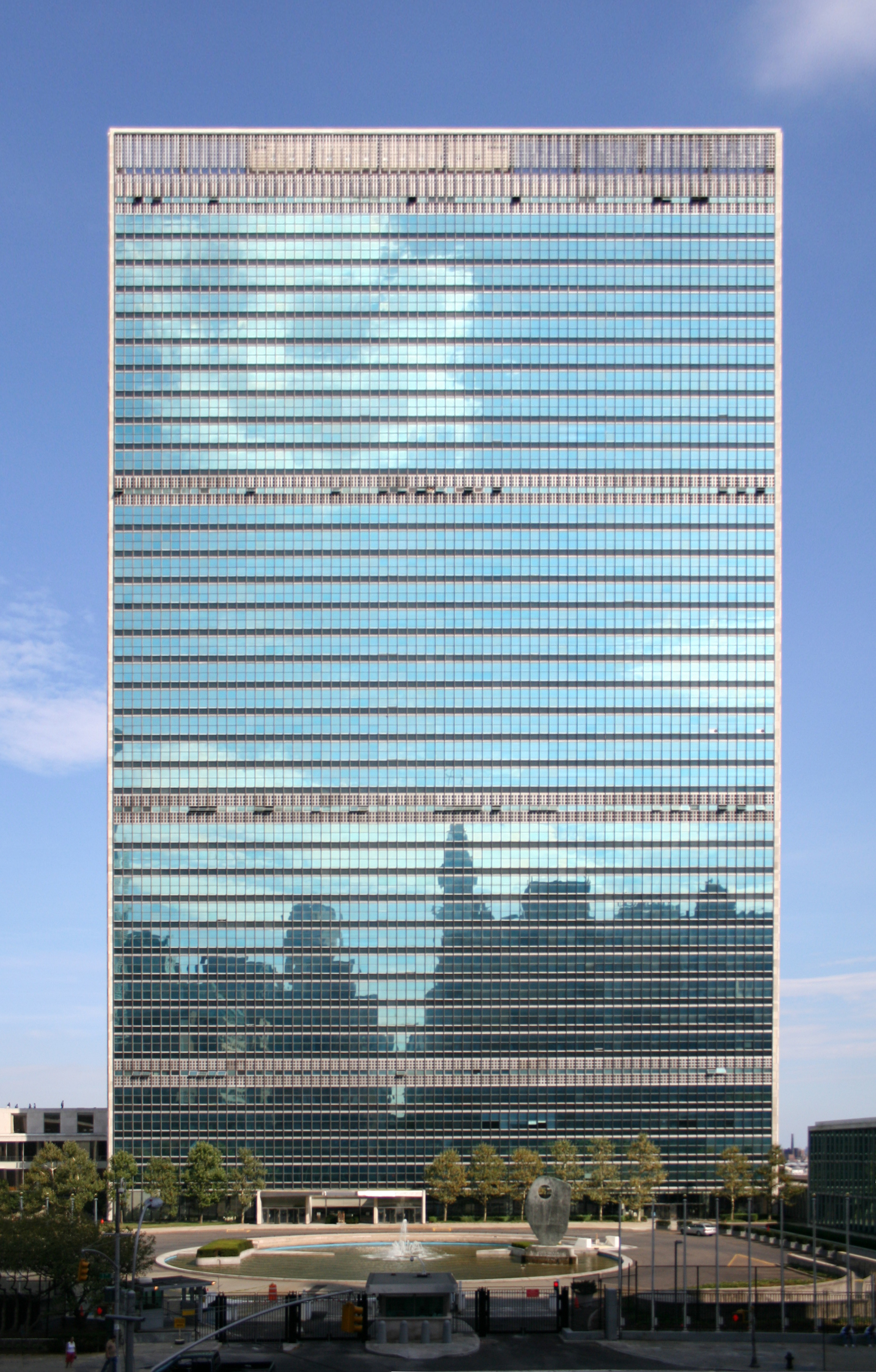
Western or front view of U.N. Secretariat, reflecting 1st Avenue buildings on the sheer face of the glass façade in classic postwar International design

It was remarked early on that the United Nations Secretariat Building was the world's largest window. It was 287 feet wide and 544 feet tall, described as "two great windows (front, or western exposure, and back, or eastern sides of the building), framed in Vermont marble." General Bronze Corporation manufactured and supplied the building with 5400 individual windows, spandrel frames, louvers, and architectural metalwork since at that time it was the world's largest fabricator of aluminum and other non-ferrous metals. The land had been donated by the Rockefeller family, the old slaughterhouse district along the East River bordered by First Avenue between East 41st and East 47th Streets. The most important building in the UN Plaza was the UN Secretariat Building, overshadowing the UN General Assembly Building. The group of architects, overseen by a lead architect, was Wallace Harrison. He coordinated an international group of designers which included Sven Markelius, Le Corbusier, and Oscar Niemeyer.

The East River site for the U.N, extending some 1500 feet from 42nd to 48th Streets, from First Avenue to the edge of the East River, had a "sufficient scale for applying the fundamental elements of modern urbanism, sunlight, and verdure. Protected, yet given spaciousness by the wide expanse of the East River, the site has breadth enough to be made a living unit of strength, dignity, and harmony, befitting a building which embodied the world." Although located in New York City, the land the U.N. rents is strictly under the administration of the U.N. and extraterritorial by a treaty with the U.S. Government. The Secretariat Building dwarfs the General Assembly Building and contains executive offices for the Secretary General, the Deputy Secretary General and the Under-Secretary-General of the U.N.; offices for the major U. N. Councils; many general business offices: legal department, public information, transportation, translators, interpreters, typing pools, dining rooms, places of worship, etc.

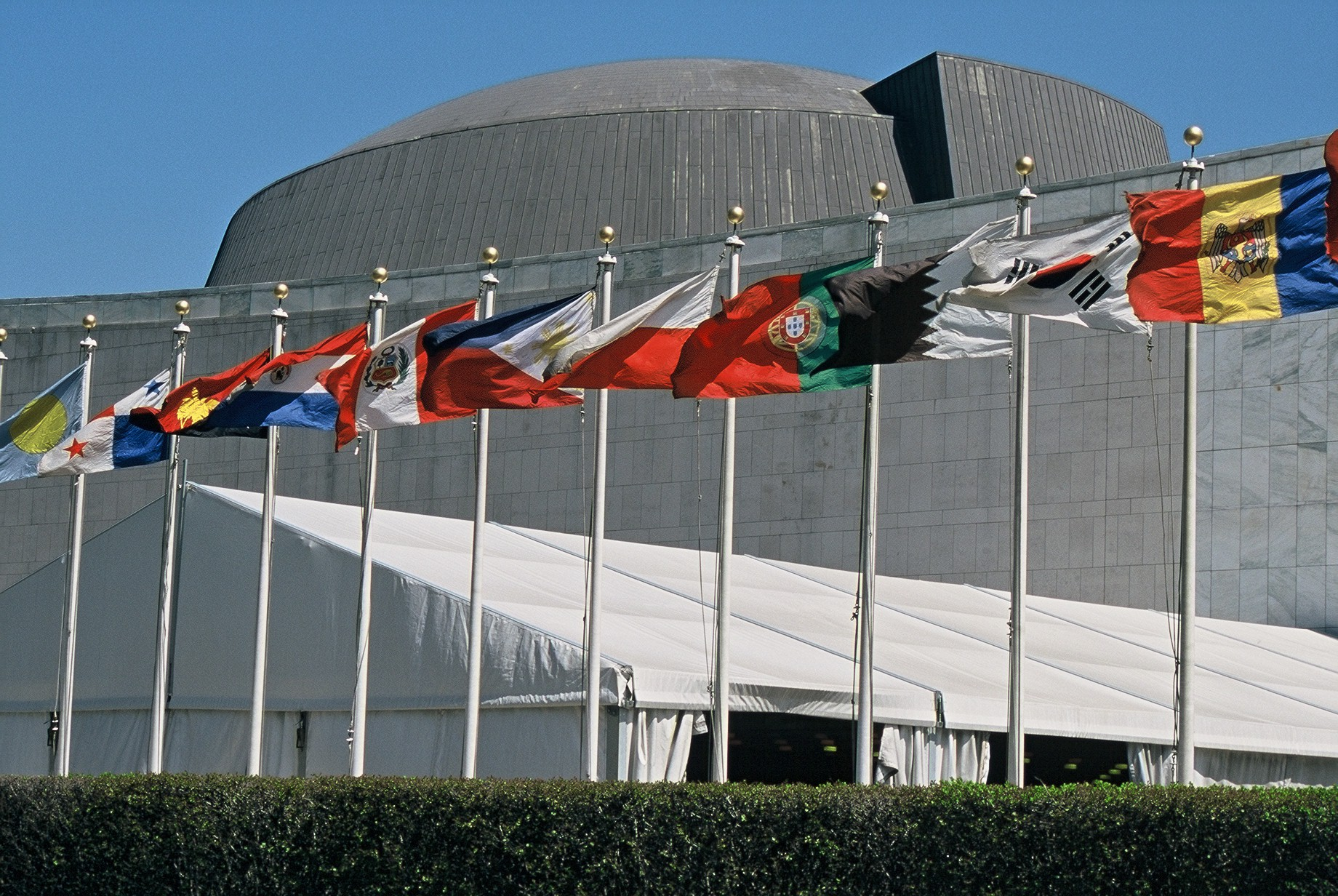
Flags of the member states of the U.N.

The vast aluminum windows manufactured by General Bronze on the east and west building walls are cantilevered beyond the structural steel columns and are supported within the light aluminum framework on double-hung aluminum sashes and fitted with blue-green heat-absorbing plate glass. The iconic building sits as a testament to world unity. Wallace Harrison "insisted that air-conditioning was its cornerstone, unlike Le Corbusier, who wanted windows that could be opened. General Bronze manufactured the windows from Harrison's innovative design, "a curtain wall catilevered two feet, nine inches, in front of the steel structure so that it formed a flush skin of blue-green Thermopane heat-absorbing glass, painted black on the inner face." The International Style design, much like the Seagram Building, "represented postwar (World War II) prosperity; for Europe it was a chance to rebuild; and for developing countries it stood for a brighter future.

=== Chase Manhattan Bank Building ===
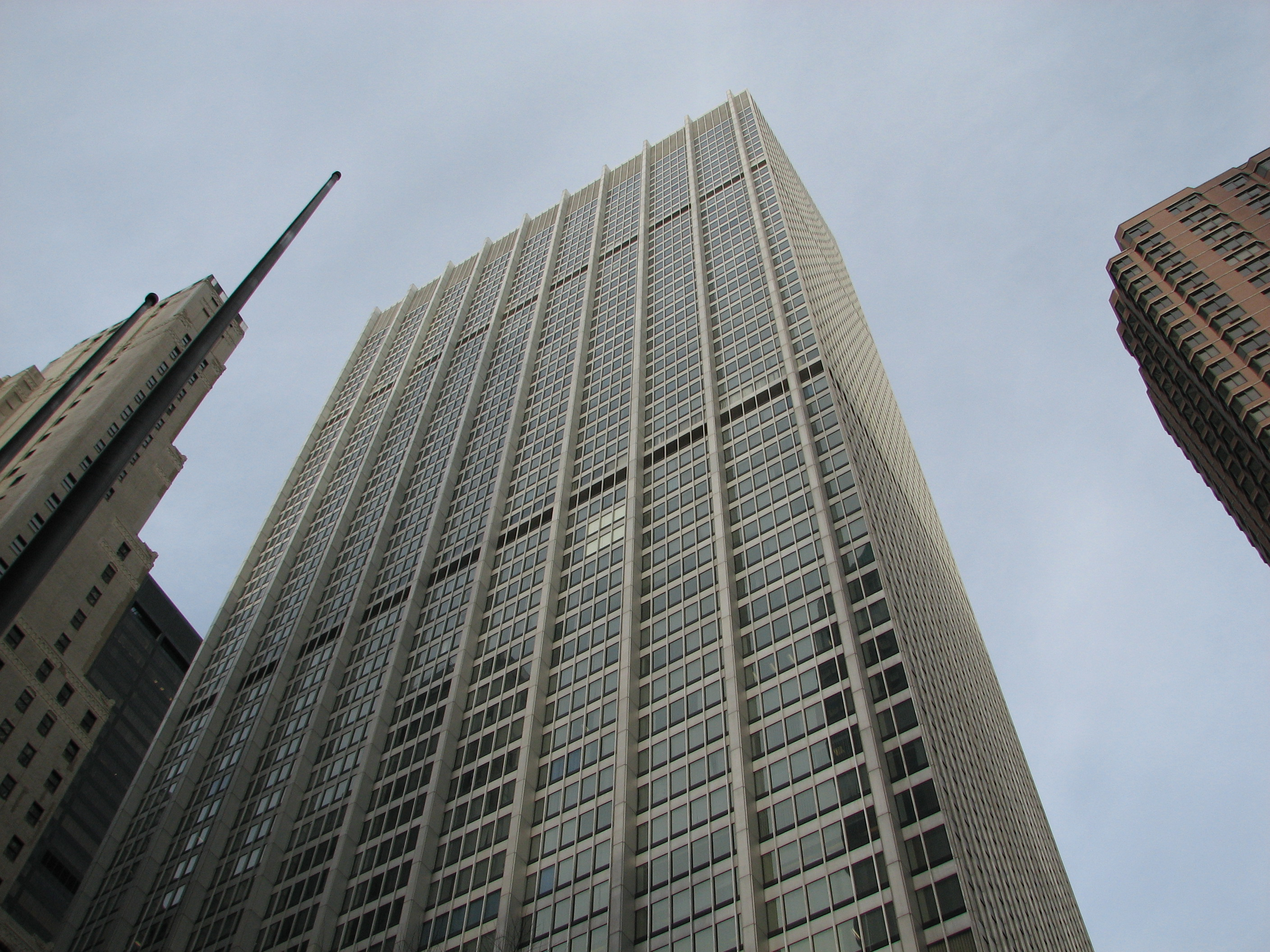
Looking up at Chase Manhattan Bank from the plaza

The Chase Manhattan Bank Building, once known as One Chase Manhattan Plaza, at 28 Liberty Street, is a "sheer, 60-story, 813-foot-tall aluminum-and-glass-sheathed tower which contains 1.8 million square feet." "The General Bronze Corporation engineered and manufactured the ¼ inch-thick aluminum panels — some as tall as 13 feet — which enclose the perimeter piers, as well as the extruded H-shaped aluminum mullions that flank the windows. General Bronze assured that the "aluminum panels would be recessed flush with the inside faces of the huge (2-foot, 10-inch by 4-foot, 11-inch) aluminum-sheathed columns." The curtain wall consists of a 4-foot 7-inch-high, two-tone aluminum spandrel and sill panel and an 8-foot-high window of clear glass. All of the natural-finished aluminum has a matte texture, as does the narrow black-anodized aluminum sill panel. Each bay is subdivided by five extruded aluminum mullions which are spaced 4 feet, 10 inches on center concerning each other and to the structural columns." Skidmore, Owings & Merrill built the present structure, where the "shining, anodized-aluminum skin stood out among the dark towers of Wall Street like a newly minted coin." The Chase Manhattan Bank Building was built on the first commercial "superblock" in New York ever since John D. Rockefeller Jr. developed Rockefeller Center. It was Rockefeller's money that "revitalized New York's financial district and paved the way for other Lower Manhattan projects like the World Trade Center and the South Street Seaport." The building was constructed after a change in New York City's building and zoning laws so that the area was large enough for Skidmore, Owings & Merrill to accommodate the building. The political method employed was a "demapping" (literally, removing a street from the city plan) of Lower Manhattan." The building sits on a two-and-a-half-acre plot after Cedar Street was removed, "to form a superblock, bordered by Pine, Liberty, William, and Nassau Streets. The Chase Manhattan Building, the trademark for David Rockefeller and the empire forged by his grandfather John D. Rockefeller, rise "60 steel-ribbed stories out of the dark canyons of the financial district, the great glass and aluminum slab of the Chase Manhattan Bank stands at 813 feet, the sixth tallest building in the city and the world," in 1961. There are 2,239,530 square feet of gross floor area, and "is the largest banking operation ever assembled under one roof, costing $813 million, the largest total investment in a building of its type, and detail for detail, in overall quality as well as outright size, one of the most remarkable planning, architectural, and engineering accomplishments," at the time it was built.

== L.S. Brach Manufacturing Corporation and Antennas ==
The radio industry had been making technical advances, particularly in the area of antenna technology, and instituted antenna design/model production for the MIT Lincoln Laboratory at Massachusetts Institute of Technology, NASA, and the Bureau of Standards. Since General Bronze has enormous access to the aluminum industry, it pursued the acquisition of L.S. Brach Manufacturing Corporation in 1948 to gain a foothold in the field of radio technology and Brach's patents. Ira Kamen became the director of the Brach Manufacturing Corporation, while George Doundoulakis became the Director of Research. Kamen had hired Doundoulakis at the RCA Institutes in New York City. Doundoulakis had experience working on the DEW Line system earlier. Kamen believed that with his expertise and Doundoulakis' energy, they both would forge ahead and seek to gain contracts in the expanding field of radio telescopes. Doundoulakis had been tutored by Kamen, an electrical engineer, in New York City who taught at the RCA Institutes. Doundoulakis, a physicist, had gained a solid foothold in the field of electronics and was encouraged by Kamen to also teach at the RCA Institutes. Subsequently, in 1956, both Doundoulakis and Kamen filed their first US patent. Later, Doundoulakis and Kamen co-authored a book on "Scatter Propagation." Doundoulakis hired Stanley Gethen, and together, both filed patents for antenna designs and radar-related projects for General Bronze. Brach Electronics had developed antennas for the automobile industry, which included motorized antennas.

=== National Radio Astronomy Observatory – Green Bank, WV ===
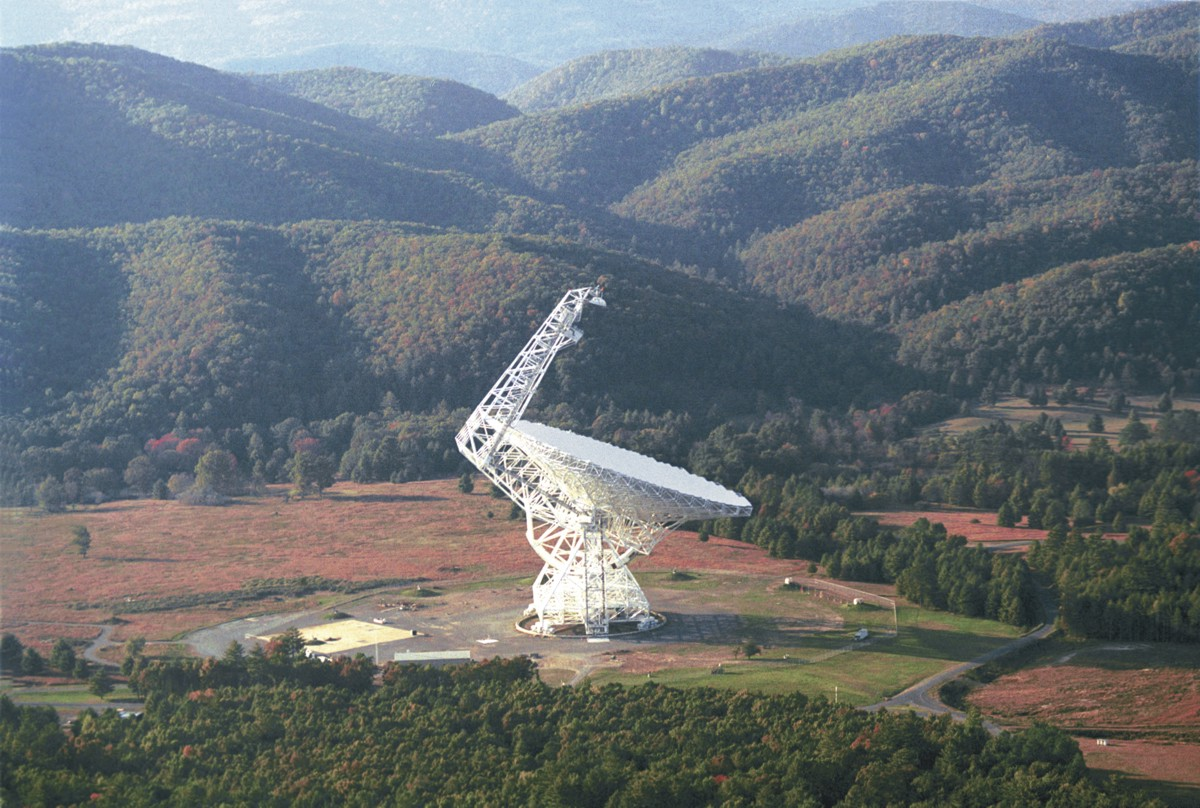
Green Bank Radio Telescope

General Bronze Corporation's (GBC) Brach subsidiary had been interested in radio telescope research in addition to automobile and boat antennas. GBC was requested, and then bid for the construction of the 90-foot and the 140-foot radio telescopes in Green Bank, VA, for the National Radio Astronomy Observatory (NRAO). The plans submitted from General Bronze include details of the bid. The Green Bank, WV, antennas were managed by the Associated Universities Incorporated (AUI), a consortium of scientists, initially from nine northeastern universities, dedicated to developing and building scientific tools for the community. GBC submitted design proposals for both the 85-foot and 140-foot radio telescopes. Ira Kamen, as director of the Brach subdivision was in direct communication with Richard Emberson, who was the assistant to the president of AUI at the founding of the National Radio Astronomy Observatory. In 1957, he became the project manager for the development of Green Bank, West Virginia radio telescopes. Kamen worked with the AUI, the overseeing entity between the National Science Foundation (NSF) and the NRAO at Green Bank. General Bronze's technical drawings, photographs, and correspondence in 1957–58, at the outset of the design and construction of the Green Bank Telescopes are referenced. However, GBC's bid was not accepted as a contractor for either the 85-foot or the 140-foot radio projects.

=== Arecibo Radio Telescope ===
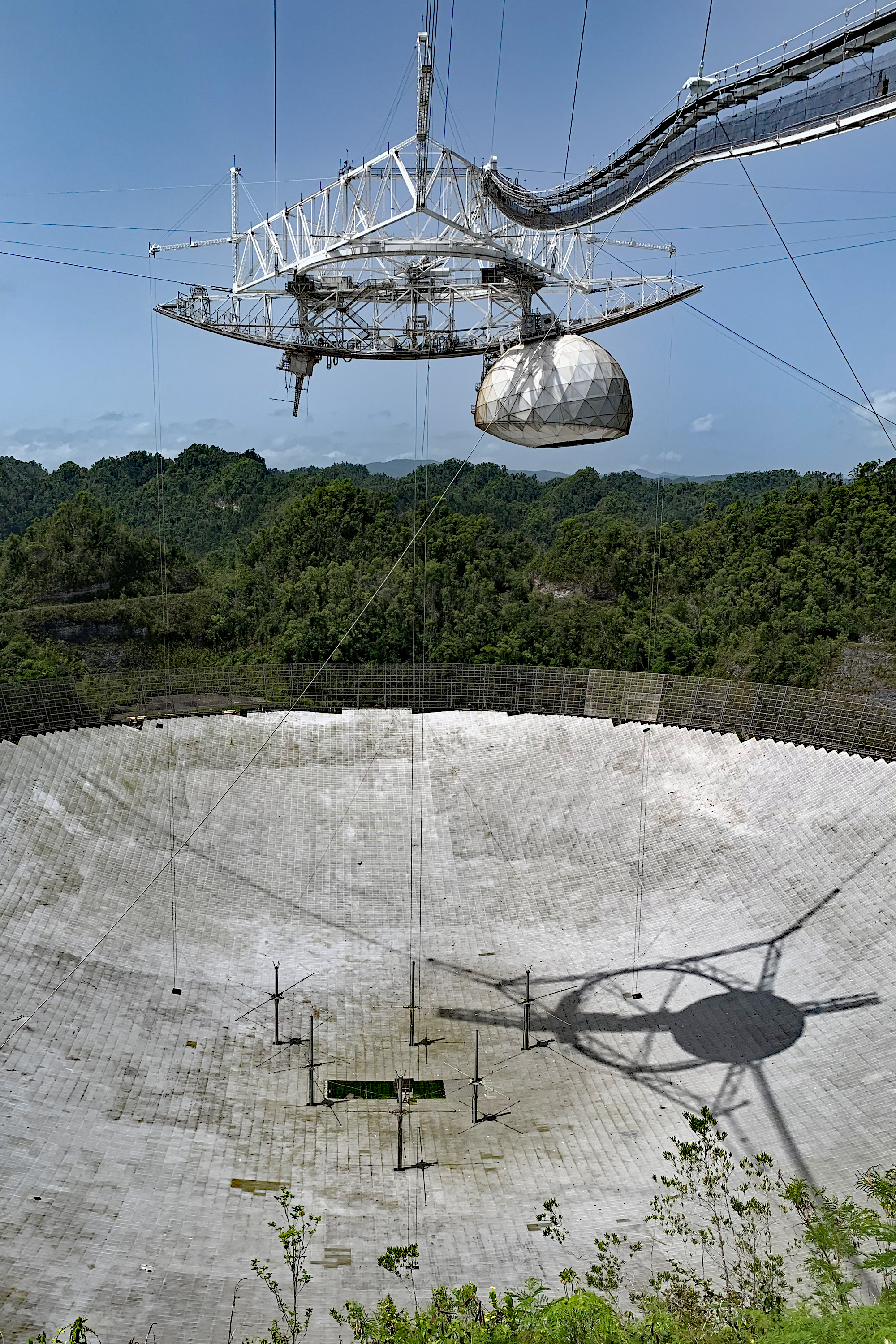
The Arecibo Radio Telescope in 2019

On the day the project for the design and construction of the Arecibo Radio Telescope was announced at Cornell University, Professor William Gordon of the electrical engineering department envisioned a 133 m (435 ft) single tower centered in a 305 m (1,000 ft) reflector to support an antenna feed. He proposed that this antenna would "be fed from a horn on a high tower." Gordon also suggested a tripod or four-legged design similar to the arches of the St. Louis Gateway Arch to suspend the antenna feed. Subsequently, Cornell University and Zachary Sears published a request for proposal (RFP) requesting a design to support an antenna feed moving along a spherical surface 133 metres (435 ft) above a stationary reflector. The RFP recommended to those chosen antenna companies that a tripod or a tower in the center to support an antenna feed was conceptualised by Gordon.

The RFP was mailed out to all major antenna companies/researchers in the field. George Doundoulakis received the RFP from Aaron Saphier, CEO of General Bronze Corporation. GBC had previously submitted proposals for the radio telescope at Green Bank, WV under the auspices of the National Radio Astronomy Observatory from GBC's Brach subdivision. General Bronze presented their proposal in the final round in December 1959, in Ithaca, New York at Cornell for their antenna suspension design RFPs. Doundoulakis had studied the idea of suspending the feed with his brother, Helias Doundoulakis, a civil engineer who received his master's thesis in bridge suspension from Brooklyn Polytechnic. George Doundoulakis recognised that Gordon's idea of supporting the proposed radio telescope's antenna feed from a tower, tripod, or four-legged structure around the center, (the most crucial area of the reflector), would severely limit the reception of radio waves. George Doundoulakis thought of a more practical way of suspending the antenna feed — by cables from four towers – thereby eliminating the problem of a "high" tower in the center of the reflector. Both George and Helias Doundoulakis told professors Gordon and Gold at the RFP meetings on 14 December 1959 "General Bronze Corporation proposes a radical departure from the other companies: two suspension bridges perpendicular to one another which will double for an antenna." He presented this proposal to Cornell University for his idea for three-and-a-half hours, while other companies were given 45 minutes. They explained how the antenna feed would hang at the intersection of two suspension bridges — in turn, supported by four towers — by a doughnut or torus-type truss attached to the antenna feed." Doundoulakis informed Professors Gordon and Gold that the tower/tripod/four-legged designs, compared to his towers/suspension bridge idea, were major engineering challenges with high construction costs. Helias Doundoulakis designed the cable suspension system – with assignees William J. Casey and Constantine Michalos – that was finally adopted. It is essentially the same design as in the original drawings by Doundoulakis – although configured with three towers rather than four towers in Doundoulakis, Michalos, and Casey's patent.

Controversy arose after Helias Doundoulakis, Constantine Michalos, and William J. Casey (CIA director under President Ronald Reagan) discovered the suspension design was used by Cornell University without their permission as exclusive patent holders. They subsequently filed a lawsuit, originally for $1.2 million but was settled for $10,000 because "the defense in a court trial would cost far more than the $10,000 for which the case was settled," and accordingly, on April 11, 1975, Doundoulakis v. U.S. (Case 412–72) had been ruled in plaintiff's favor by the United States Court of Federal Claims, that "(a) a judgment has been entered in favor of the plaintiffs Helias Doundoulakis, William J. Casey, and Constantine Michalos against the United States and (b) in consideration of the sum of $10,000 to be paid by the United States Government to the plaintiff, the plaintiffs grants to the United States Government an irrevocable, fully-paid, non-exclusive license under the aforesaid U.S. Patent No. 3, 273, 156 to Cornell University."

== See also ==
- Architecture of New York City
- List of cities with the most skyscrapers
- List of tallest buildings
- List of tallest buildings in the United States
