= Atlas (statue) =

Statue of Atlas at Rockefeller Center in Manhattan, New York, U.S.

Coordinates: 40°45′32.12″N 73°58′37.84″W

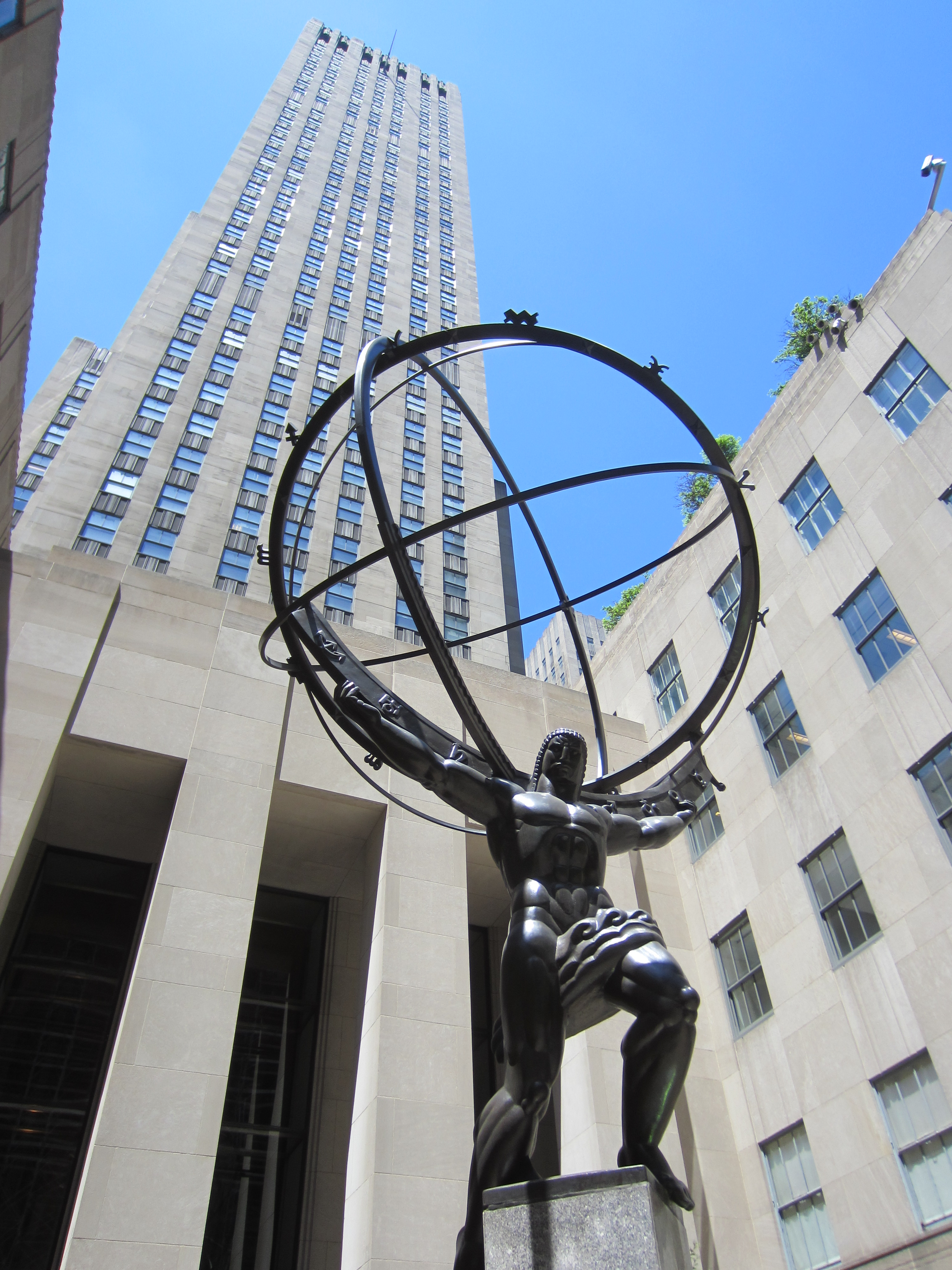
- Artist: Lee Lawrie
- Year: 1937
- Type: Bronze
- Dimensions: 14 m (45 ft)
- Location: New York City

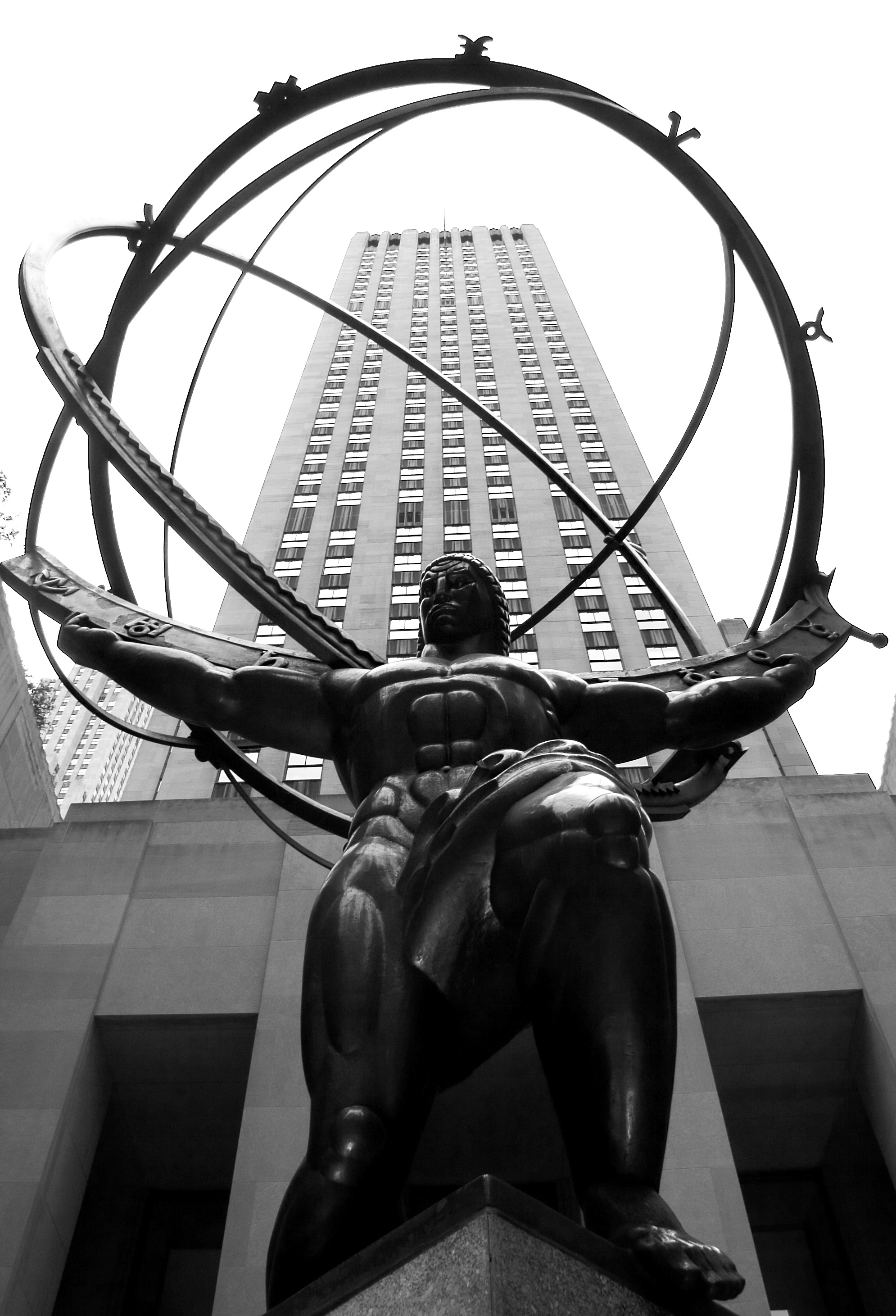
Atlas statue located at Rockefeller Center

Atlas is a bronze statue in Rockefeller Center, within the International Building's courtyard, in Midtown Manhattan in New York City. It is across Fifth Avenue from St. Patrick's Cathedral. The sculpture depicts the ancient Greek Titan Atlas holding the heavens on his shoulders.

Atlas was created by the sculptor Lee Lawrie with the help of Rene Paul Chambellan and was installed in 1937. Atlas was cast at the Roman Bronze Works, a subsidiary of the General Bronze Corporation in Corona, Queens. The Roman Bronze Works had long been a sub-contractor to Louis C. Tiffany's Tiffany Studios which was then bought out by the General Bronze Corporation in 1928. Under the ownership of General Bronze, the Roman Bronze Works produced some of its finest bronze artwork from sculptors like Paul Manship, Rene Chambellan, and Lawrie.

The sculpture is in the Art Deco style of Rockefeller Center. The figure of Atlas in the sculpture is 15 feet (4.6 m) tall, while the entire statue is 45 feet (14 m) tall. It weighs 14,000 pounds (6,400 kg), and is the largest sculpture at Rockefeller Center.

Atlas is depicted carrying the celestial vault on his shoulders. The north–south axis of the armillary sphere on his shoulders points towards the North Star's position relative to New York City. The statue stands on one muscular leg atop a small stone pedestal, whose corner faces Fifth Avenue.

== In popular culture ==
Most Rainforest Cafe locations have a Atlas statue and water fountain holding a Earth globe with the words "Rescue The Rainforest" to communicate a conversation message in the middle of the restaurant.

The piece has since been appropriated as a symbol of the Objectivist movement and has been associated with Ayn Rand's novel Atlas Shrugged (1957).

It has been featured in almost every episode of the television series 30 Rock, appearing in numerous establishing shots depicting the 30 Rockefeller Plaza building, where the series is set.

Ridley Scott has cited the sculpture as the aesthetic inspiration for the character "Mother," on HBO Max's Raised by Wolves.

== See also ==
- Atlas (architecture)
- Farnese Atlas
