= Prometheus (Manship) =

Sculpture by Paul Manship in Manhattan, New York

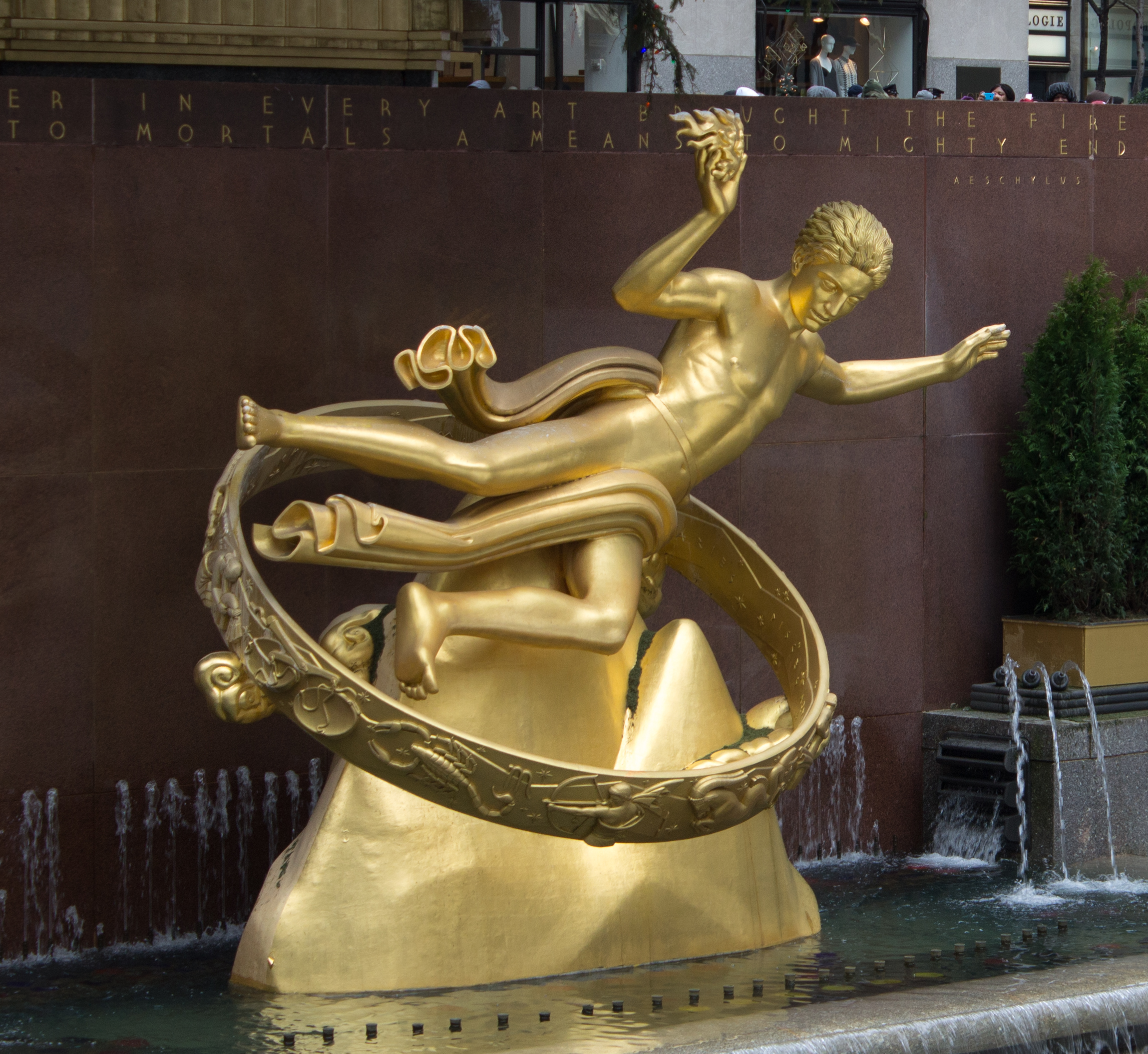
- The sculpture in 2013
- Artist: Paul Manship
- Year: 1934
- Type: Sculpture
- Medium: Bronze
- Dimensions: 5.5 m (18 ft)
- Location: New York City, New York, United States; 40.75872°N 73.97859°W

Prometheus is a 1934 gilded, cast bronze sculpture by Paul Manship, located above the lower plaza at Rockefeller Center in Manhattan, New York City.

It was created by the Roman Bronze Works, a subsidiary of the General Bronze Corporation in Corona, Queens. The Roman Bronze Works had long been a sub-contractor to Louis Comfort Tiffany's Tiffany Studios which was then bought out by the General Bronze Corporation in 1928. Under the ownership of General Bronze, the Roman Bronze Works produced some of its finest bronze artwork from sculptors like Paul Manship, Rene Chambellan, Gaston Lachaise and Lee Lawrie.

The "Prometheus" is set against the west wall of the sunken plaza in front of 30 Rockefeller Plaza, of what was once the RCA Building. It is visible from Fifth Avenue. The "Prometheus Fountain," with its restaurants and ice skating rink (winter), has become one of the most visited and photographed places in New York City, especially around Christmas time with the lighting of the Christmas Tree.

The statue is 18 ft (5.5 m) tall and weighs 8 tons. It depicts the Greek legend of the Titan Prometheus, who was the son of the Titan Iapetus and the Oceanid Clymene, brought fire to mankind by stealing it from the Chariot of the Sun, which resulted in Zeus chaining Prometheus and sending an eagle to prey upon his continually regenerating liver.

== Description ==
The recumbent figure is in a 60-by-16-foot (18.3 by 4.9 m) fountain basin in front of a gray, rectangular wall in the Lower Plaza, at the middle of Rockefeller Center. Prometheus falls through a ring – representing the heavens, and inscribed with the signs of the zodiac - toward the earth (the mountain) and the sea (the pool). The inscription – a paraphrase from Aeschylus – on the granite wall behind, reads: "Prometheus, teacher in every art, brought the fire that hath proved to mortals a means to mighty ends."

Prometheus is considered the main artwork of Rockefeller Center, and is one of the complex's more well-known works. The seasonal Rockefeller Center Christmas Tree is erected above the statue every winter. During the rest of the year, Prometheus serves as the main aesthetic draw in the lower plaza's outdoor restaurant.

=== Associated artworks ===
The statue was initially flanked by Manship's Youth and Maiden - the "Mankind Figures" - which occupied the granite shelves to the rear. They were relocated to Palazzo d'Italia from 1939 to 1984 because Manship thought they did not fit visually. Originally gilded, they were given a brown patina when restored. They were moved to the staircase above the skating rink in 2001, as if they are "announcing Prometheus". Today their original locations are covered with plants. Four Prometheus maquettes exist: one at the Smithsonian Institution's Smithsonian American Art Museum, one at the Minnesota Museum of Art, and two in private collections. A full-scale replica existed at Jakarta's Grand Indonesia Shopping Town in the Entertainment District's Fountain Atrium, but it has been removed in late 2019 due to the new LED Screen display.

== History ==
Manship's early passion for Ancient Greece's mythological heroes, most notably Heracles, can be attributed to his apprenticeships of two Danish-American brothers — Gutzon and Solon Borglum — and later to Isidore Konti. It was these masters who taught Manship the classical "archaic Greek figurative sculpture which is so much more abstract than Hellenistic or Roman art, and particularly impressed Manship," according to Harry Rand.

Throughout his travels to Italy and Greece during the early 1900s, Manship's drawings from that time period illustrate how he was inspired with "archaic Greek" fundamentals. He was the "first American sculptor to exalt such principles over the classical art of Phidias and Polykleitos." Manship was transfixed by the archaic style and simplicity as seen in the Artemision Bronze, a statue of either Zeus or Poseidon, on display at the National Archaeological Museum in Athens, Greece. Manship's "Spear Thrower" and his "Atalanta," exhibit these same graceful, sublime curves, as seen in the Artemision Bronze.

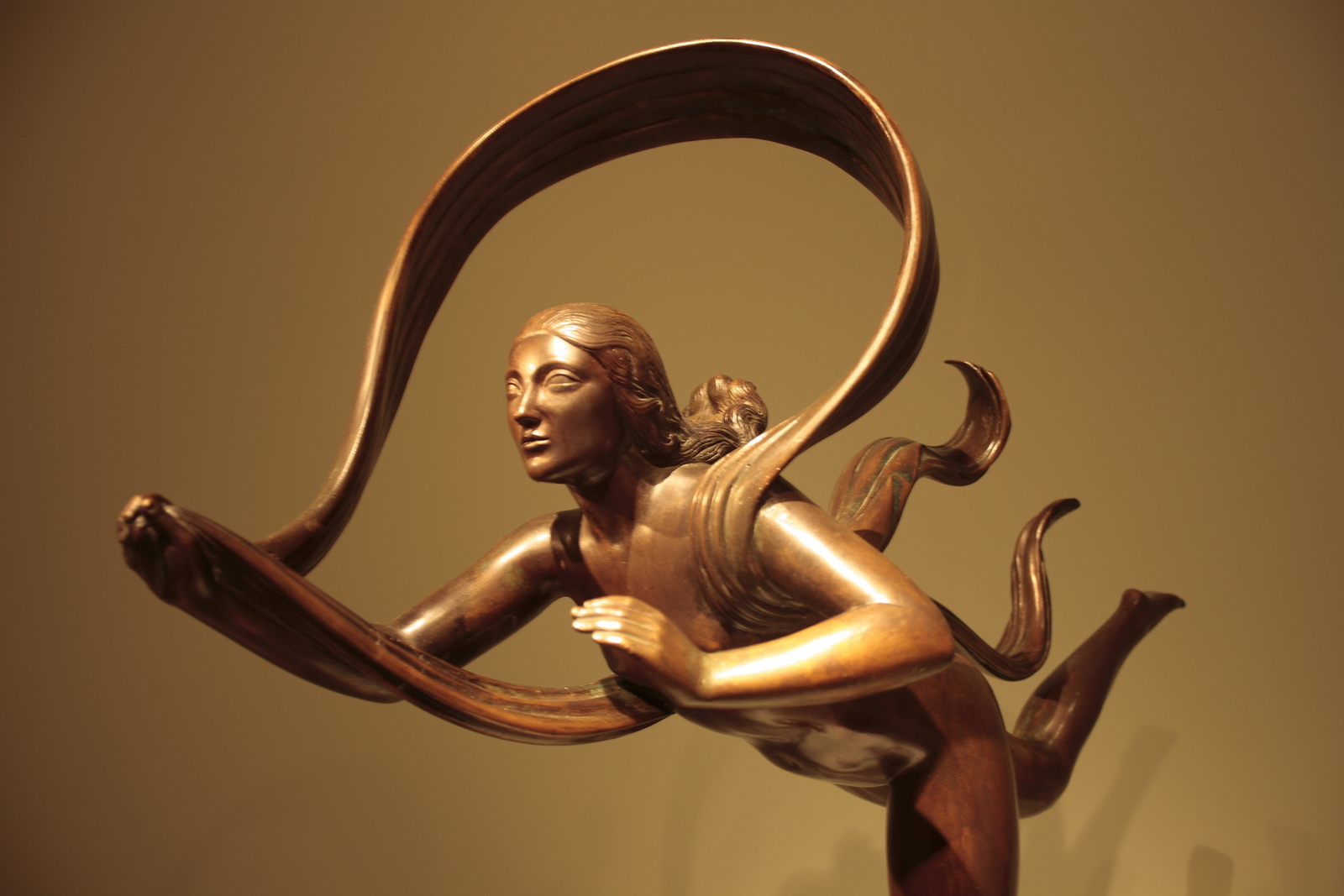
Manship's Atalanta, 1921, Smithsonian American Art Museum, Washington, D.C.

When he was notified by the Rockefeller Center architects that he was chosen over countless others, he wasn't surprised. It was a moment Manship had prepared himself for all his life. According to Rand, "the Rockefeller Center architects knew that he alone was the only sculptor that they could count on." What had been marvelous in his "archaic" apprenticeships became magical in his Prometheus.

"Manship produced truly derivative work; he had studied the sculptors of other ages firsthand, and the distillate of his observations formed the elements of his style. The process Manship went through was the same "as any Greek artist who had been taught to accept the canons of art formulated by the Masters""

— Harry Rand, Paul Manship, p. 144.

The sculpture was regilded in 2025.

=== Models ===
The model for the full-scale Prometheus sculpture was Leonardo Nole (c. 1907–1998), an Italian-American lifeguard from New Rochelle who modeled for college art classes. He spent three months posing for this assignment in the spring of 1933. After World War II, he became a postal worker. Manship's assistant Angelo Colombo did most of the detail work when Nole was posing. Henry Kreis, another assistant, sculpted the hair. (Note: "Kreis" was misspelled as "Krist" in Nole's obituary in The New York Times.) Artist's model Ray Van Cleef evidently posed for the original small-scale rendering that the full-scale sculpture was based on.

== Gallery ==
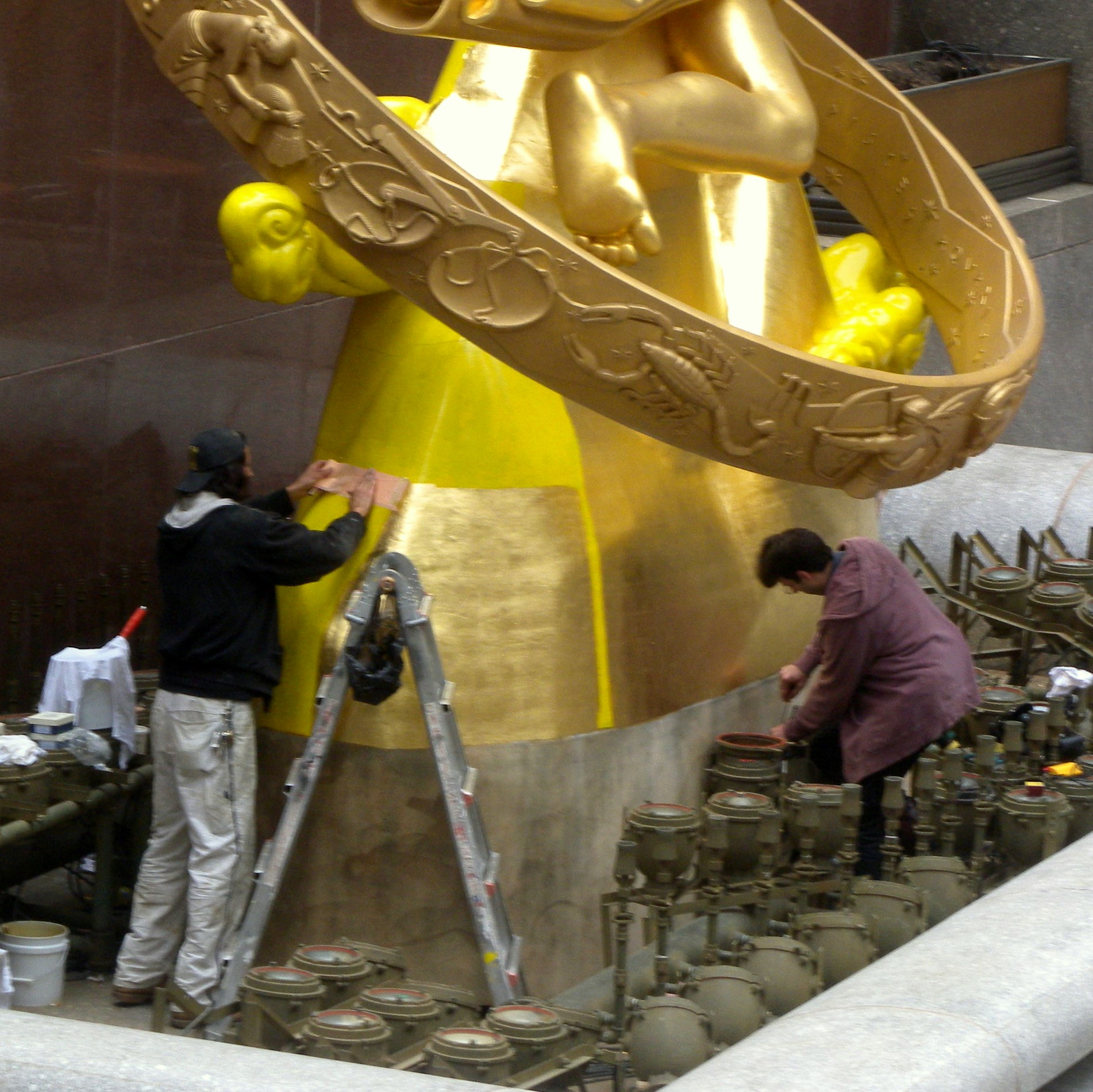
Regilding in 2011

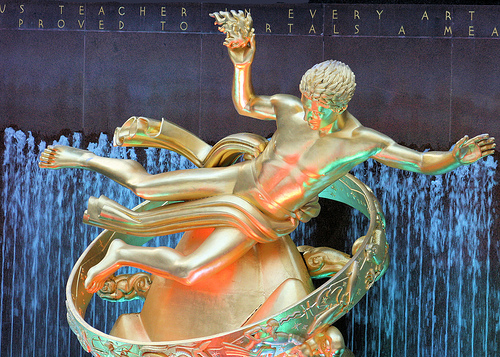
Prometheus, 1934, Rockefeller Center, New York City

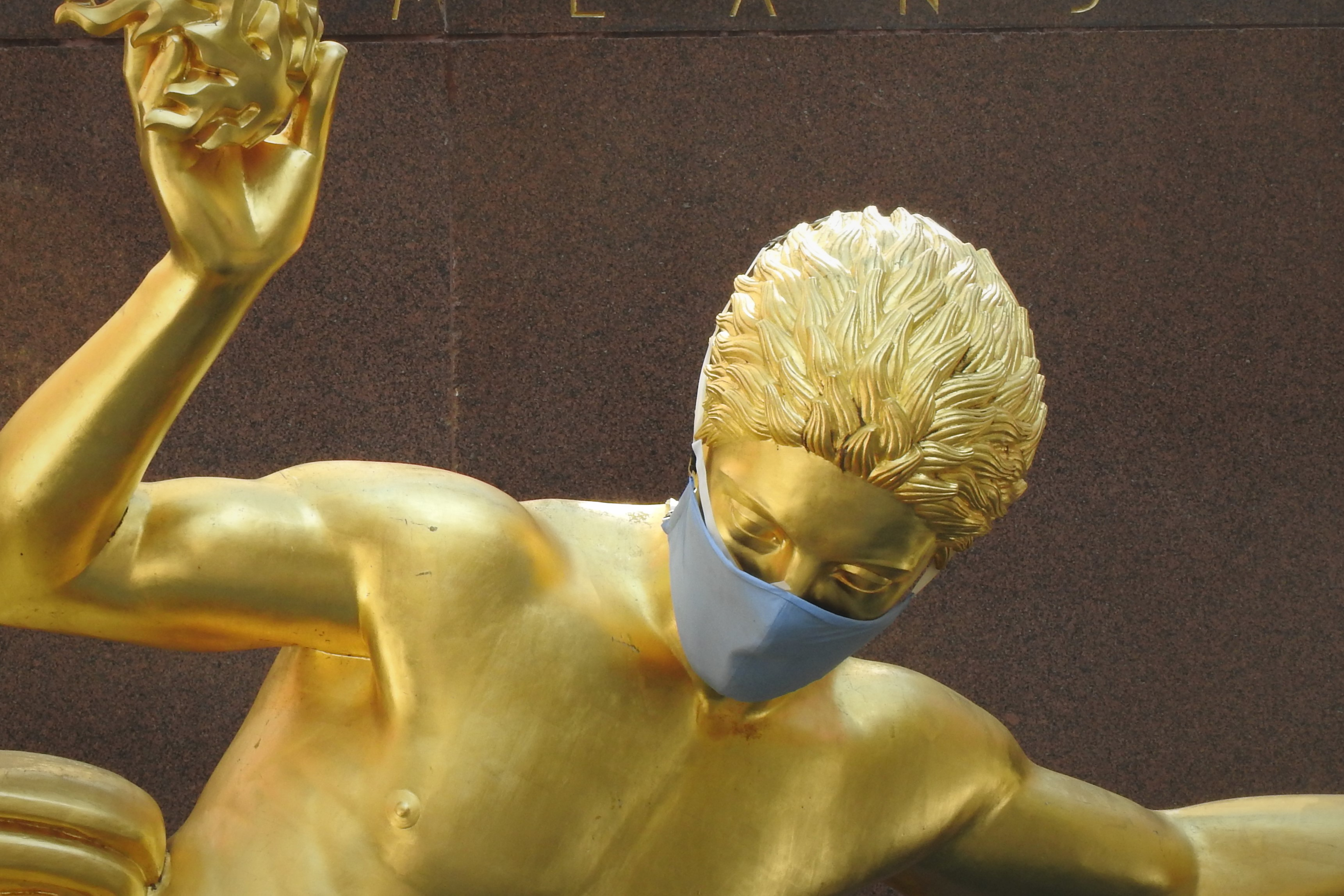
Wearing a mask during the COVID-19 pandemic in New York City

== See also ==
- 1934 in art
