= British Empire Building =

Building in Rockefeller Center, New York City

- Viewed from Fifth Avenue (2026)

General information
- Type: Office building
- Location: 620 Fifth Avenue; New York, NY 10112
- Coordinates: 40.75826°N 73.97792°W
- Completed: 1933
- Owner: Tishman Speyer

Height
- Roof: 90 ft (27 m) (excluding penthouse)

Technical details
- Floor count: 6 (+1 1/2-story penthouse)

Design and construction
- Architects: Associated Architects, including Raymond Hood
- Developer: John D. Rockefeller Jr.
- Structural engineer: Post & McCord
- British Empire Building
- U.S. Historic district – Contributing property
- New York City Landmark
- Area: 22 acres (8.9 ha)
- Architect: Raymond Hood
- Architectural style: Modern, Art Deco
- Part of: Rockefeller Center (ID87002591)
- NYCL No.: 1446

Significant dates
- Designated CP: December 23, 1987
- Designated NYCL: April 23, 1985

The British Empire Building, also known by its address 620 Fifth Avenue, is a commercial building at Rockefeller Center in the Midtown Manhattan neighborhood of New York City. Completed in 1933, the six-story structure was designed in the Art Deco style by Raymond Hood, Rockefeller Center's lead architect. The British Empire Building, along with the nearly identical La Maison Francaise to the south and the high-rise International Building to the north, comprise a group of retail-and-office structures known as the International Complex. La Maison Francaise and the British Empire Building are separated by Channel Gardens, a planted pedestrian esplanade running west to the complex's Lower Plaza.

The facade is made of limestone, with a main entrance along Fifth Avenue and secondary entrances on 50th Street and Channel Gardens. The top of the British Empire Building contains setbacks, a rooftop garden, and a partial seventh-story penthouse. The building's entrances contain ornate decorations by Lee Lawrie and Carl Paul Jennewein, while the windows include decorations by Rene Paul Chambellan. The entire Rockefeller Center complex is a New York City designated landmark and a National Historic Landmark.

La Maison Francaise and the British Empire Building were developed as part of the construction of Rockefeller Center after a proposal for a single building on the site was scrapped. After the British government signed a lease for the building in January 1932, work began the next month with a groundbreaking ceremony in July 1932. The building was completed in 1933 and initially mainly hosted British companies. Over the years, the building has contained a variety of tenants, including stores and travel companies.

== Site ==
Buildings of Rockefeller Center
Buildings and structures in Rockefeller Center:
1 1 Rockefeller Plaza
2 10 Rockefeller Plaza
3 La Maison Francaise
4 British Empire Building
5 30 Rockefeller Plaza
6 International Building
7 50 Rockefeller Plaza
8 1230 Avenue of the Americas
9 Radio City Music Hall
10 1270 Avenue of the Americas
11 75 Rockefeller Plaza
12 600 Fifth Avenue
13 608 Fifth Avenue
14 1271 Avenue of the Americas
15 1251 Avenue of the Americas
16 1221 Avenue of the Americas
17 1211 Avenue of the Americas

The British Empire Building is part of the Rockefeller Center complex in the Midtown Manhattan neighborhood of New York City. Located at 620 Fifth Avenue, it is part of Rockefeller Center's International Complex. The British Empire Building's architectural twin La Maison Francaise is directly to the south, and the International Building is directly to the north. The rectangular land lot is shared with La Maison Francaise and is bounded by Rockefeller Plaza to the west, 50th Street to the north, Fifth Avenue to the east, and 49th Street to the south. It covers 63,261 square feet (5,877.1 m^{2}) and has a frontage of 200.83 ft (61 m) on Fifth Avenue and 315 ft (96 m) on the streets.

The Channel Gardens, a 60-foot-wide (18 m), 200-foot-long (61 m) planted pedestrian esplanade, separates the British Empire Building and La Maison Francaise. It is named after the English Channel, the waterway separating Britain and France. The plaza slopes down toward the Lower Plaza to the west. The Lower Plaza is a below-grade courtyard containing Paul Manship's Prometheus sculpture and a seasonal ice rink. Architectural critic Paul Goldberger of The New York Times described the British Empire Building, Channel Gardens, and La Maison Francaise as "leading to a central focus", namely the Lower Plaza.

The British Empire Building is in the eastern section of the Rockefeller Center complex. Within Rockefeller Center, the building faces 1 Rockefeller Plaza to the south, 10 Rockefeller Plaza to the southwest, 30 Rockefeller Plaza to the west, 50 Rockefeller Plaza to the northwest, and the British Empire Building and International Building to the north. The building is also near St. Patrick's Cathedral to the northeast, the Saks Fifth Avenue flagship store (including 623 Fifth Avenue) to the east, 597 Fifth Avenue to the southeast, and 608 Fifth Avenue and 600 Fifth Avenue to the south. The site was previously part of the campus of Columbia University, which retained ownership of most of the land well after the complex was built.

== Architecture ==
The British Empire Building is a six-story limestone building, with setbacks to the north and south above the fifth story. The building was designed by the Associated Architects of Rockefeller Center, composed of the firms of Corbett, Harrison & MacMurray; Hood, Godley & Fouilhoux; and Reinhard & Hofmeister. The Associated Architects designed all of Rockefeller Center's buildings in the Art Deco style.

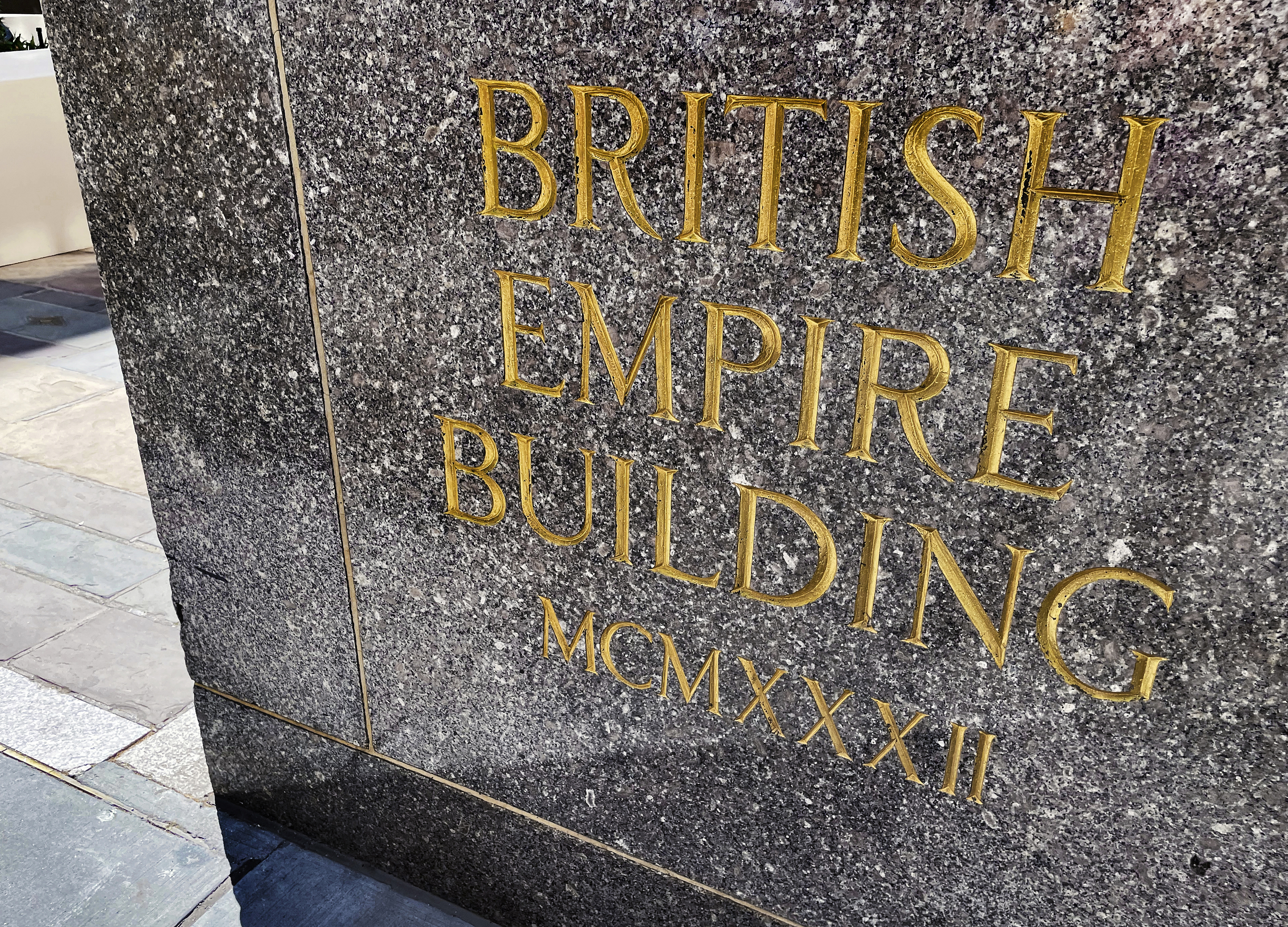
British Empire Building Marker 1932

According to The New York Times, the British Empire Building measures 90 feet (27 m) tall to the top of its sixth story. The edifice measures 70 feet (21 m) on Fifth Avenue and 200 feet (61 m) on 50th Street. There is a 1 1/2-story penthouse above the west half of the sixth story and a roof garden above the eastern half of the sixth story. The seventh-story penthouse gives the building a more imposing massing along the Lower Plaza than along Fifth Avenue. The masses of the British Empire Building and La Maison Francaise complement that of 623 Fifth Avenue to the east and 30 Rockefeller Plaza to the west.

=== Facade ===
The entire facade is made of limestone. The ground floor of the British Empire Building includes storefronts and display windows on all four elevations. The building's storefronts were originally assigned address numbers 620A to 620G on Fifth Avenue. The British Empire Building contains a cornerstone at its southeast corner, with inscriptions. Above the ground floor is a cornice with a bead and reel molding. The second through seventh floors have steel sash windows with slightly recessed limestone spandrels between the windows on each story. The windows are separated by flat vertical piers with ribbon moldings at their capitals. Three flagpoles hang from the piers on Fifth Avenue. The setbacks are also topped by ribbon moldings. There are also cornices above the setbacks, which were intended to draw viewers' attention toward 30 Rockefeller Plaza.

Hartley Burr Alexander, a mythology and symbology professor who oversaw Rockefeller Center's art program, led the installation of artwork throughout the complex. Rockefeller Center's international complex was decorated to an international theme, with motifs representing the arts, peace, and commerce. The British Empire Building's artwork was themed to "symbols of a new day". The building's art was designed by American artists. This contrasted with La Maison Francaise and the International Building's Palazzo d'Italia wing, which were decorated by artists from the buildings' respective home countries of France and Italy. As Britain did not have a good economy at the time of the building's construction, most of the artwork in the building focused on the historical empire rather than its artistic contribution.

==== Fifth Avenue ====
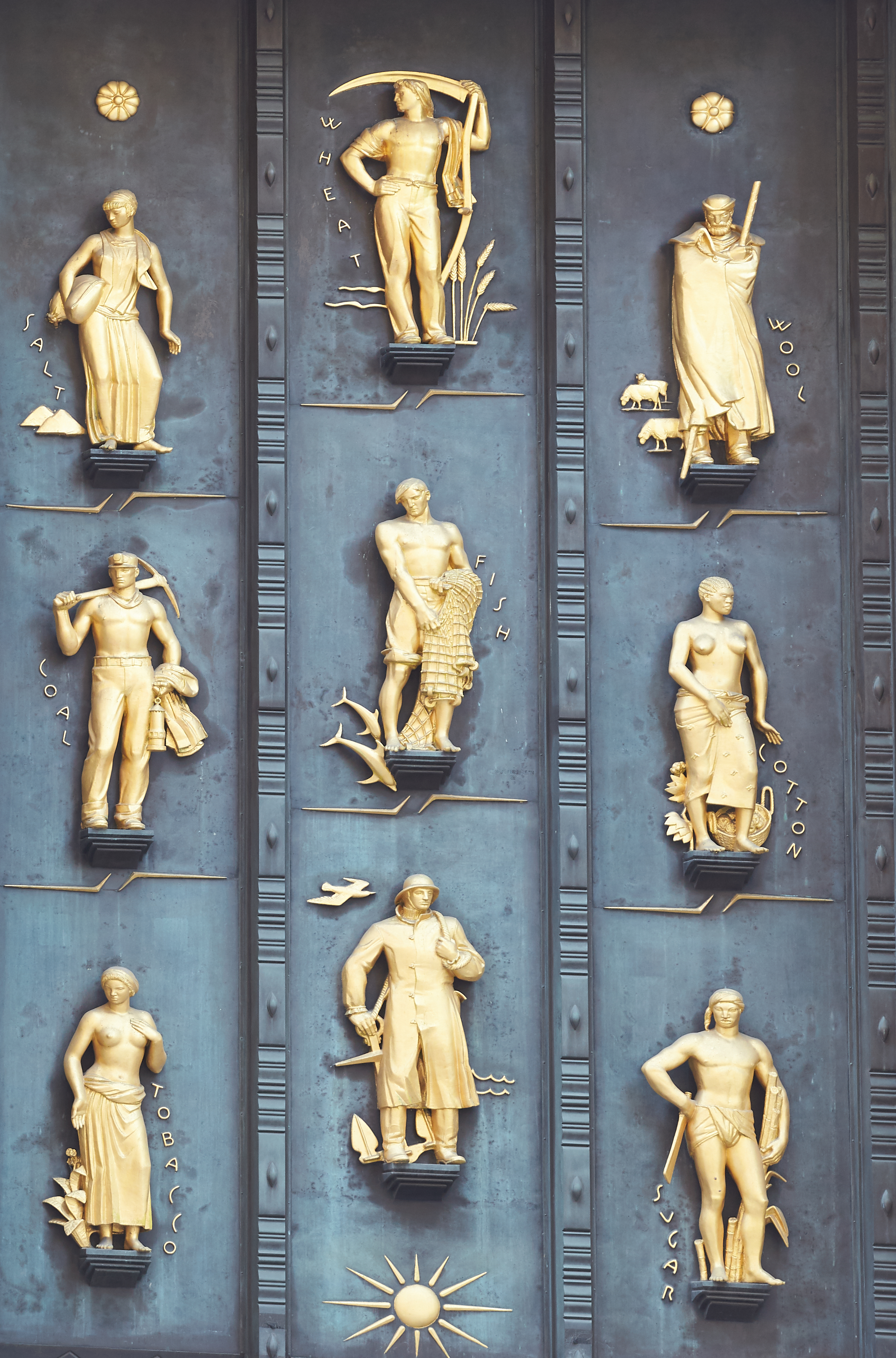
Portal with gold leaf figures

Carl Paul Jennewein sculpted nine gold-leaf figures on three vertical panels above the entrance, signifying commerce and industry in different parts of the British Empire. They represent the major industries and the products traded within the empire: salt, coal, tobacco, wheat, fish, wool, cotton, and sugar. Some of the figures also serve as personifications of countries in the Commonwealth of Nations. All figures except the central one are labeled with their respective industry. A radial sun beneath the center figures symbolizes the global empire on which "the sun never sets".

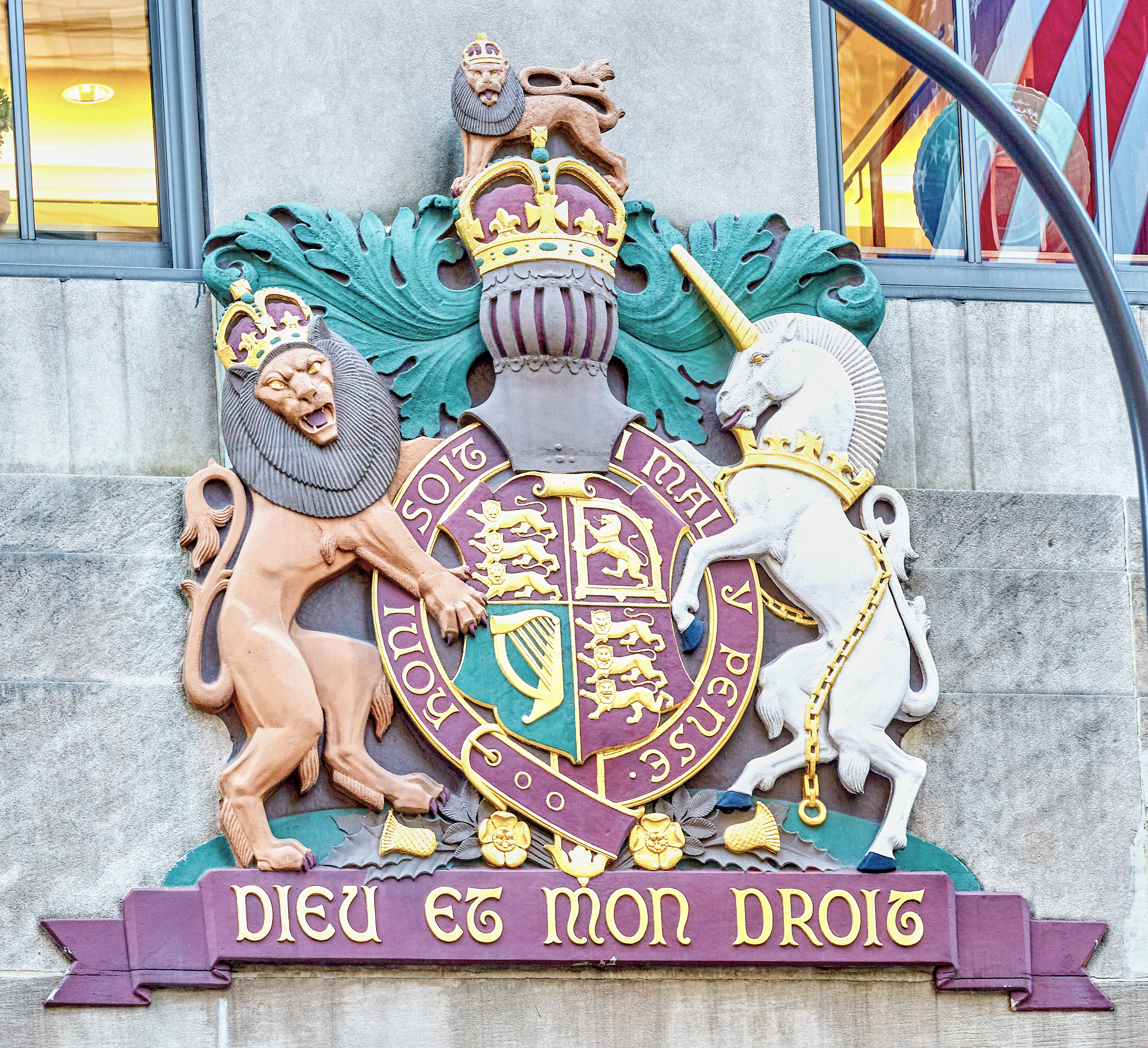
Limestone cartouche

Above these panels, Jennewein also sculpted a cartouche that depicts the British coat of arms. The coat of arms is divided into quadrants with gold-colored motifs. The top left and bottom right quadrants have three passant guardant lions on a red background, signifying England. The top right quadrant shows a rampant lion on a red background, representing Scotland. The bottom left quadrant depicts a harp on a green background, standing for Ireland. Around the coat of arms is a ribbon with the gilded motto of the British chivalric Order of the Garter: "Honi soit qui mal y pense" (Shame on him who thinks evil about it). A lion with a crown is to the left of the coat of arms, while a unicorn is to the right; they represent England and Scotland respectively. Additional motifs of the British Isles are present below the animals. The bottom of the bas relief is inscribed with the motto of the British Royalty: "Dieu et mon droit" (God and my right).

Rene Chambellan created four bas-reliefs above the sixth-story windows. They depict the coats of arms of Wales, England, Scotland, and Ireland from left to right. The Welsh panel depicts plumes above a Welsh Dragon, while the English panel depicts a lion and a Tudor rose. The Scottish panel is a unicorn with a thistle, while the Irish panel contains a stag, a harp, and a trefoil shamrock. Early plans called for the Fifth Avenue elevation to be capped by a limestone frieze and statues, but these were greatly simplified in the final plans.

==== Other elevations ====
The west elevation rises seven stories and includes display windows, but no doors, at ground level. West of the building, stairs descend from the sidewalk to the Lower Plaza. As a result, the west elevation's left display window is smaller than the other display windows on that elevation. The west elevation does not itself set back, but the fifth- and seventh-story setbacks of the north and south elevations are visible. The west elevation is divided by four piers, each with a bronze hood for illumination. The leftmost pier contains a small inscription with the text "Rockefeller Center".

The north and south elevations are similar to each other and include ground-level storefronts and display windows. On the ground story of both elevations, there are four storefronts or display windows on either side of a secondary entrance. On the secondary entrances, Lee Lawrie placed decorations signifying symbols of the empire's power. The entrances themselves are recessed and include revolving doors. The western eight bays of each elevation rise to the seventh story, with limestone lattice spandrels and an additional setback above six of these bays. There is a cornerstone with an inscription at the southeast corner of the building.

The northern entrance at 10 West 50th Street is simple in design. It contains three gilded lions in a passant-gardant posture, which are carved into the limestone block above the entrance. Beneath the lions is a lintel with gray-and-gold background and red Tudor roses. The southern entrance on Channel Gardens is topped by a gilded carving of Mercury, flying over a set of blue-green waves. Mercury is depicted carrying a caduceus, with a fan-shaped sun above him. Below Mercury is a lintel with dark-blue rhombuses and golden triangles. Both entrances' decorations were made in intaglio, making them flush with the facade.

=== Features ===
The British Empire Building and La Maison Francaise together contain only 173,000 square feet (16,100 m^{2}) of floor area, even though their site can theoretically accommodate a 912,800-square-foot (84,800 m^{2}) building. When the building was completed, it had a gross floor area of 54,000 square feet (5,000 m^{2}) across six stories and two basements. The basement connects to other buildings at Rockefeller Center, including 30 Rockefeller Plaza, the International Building, and La Maison Francaise. The building had a high-pressure steam system in place of radiators. During summer, the interior spaces were cooled to 80 °F (27 °C) by high-pressure steam, supplied by melting up to 600,000 pounds (270,000 kg) of ice per day. During winter, the interior temperature was kept at 70 °F (21 °C).

The superstructure is made of skeletal steel and weighs 1,700 short tons (1,500 long tons; 1,500 t). The building's steel structure was strengthened to support the weight of the rooftop garden, which is planted with flowers and hedges. The rooftop also contains a memorial garden known as Anzac Garden, which was installed in 1942. C. J. Hughes of The New York Times described the roof gardens in 2019 as "jewels that have broken loose from a necklace and landed on a dusty floor".

== History ==
The construction of Rockefeller Center occurred between 1932 and 1940 (Note: 30 Rockefeller Plaza was the first building to start construction, in September 1932. The last building was completed in 1940.) on land that John D. Rockefeller Jr. leased from Columbia University. The Rockefeller Center site was originally supposed to be occupied by a new opera house for the Metropolitan Opera. By 1928, Benjamin Wistar Morris and designer Joseph Urban were hired to come up with blueprints for the house. However, the new building was too expensive for the opera to fund by itself, and it needed an endowment. The project ultimately gained Rockefeller's support. The planned opera house was canceled in December 1929 due to various issues, and Rockefeller quickly negotiated with Radio Corporation of America (RCA) and its subsidiaries, National Broadcasting Company (NBC) and Radio-Keith-Orpheum (RKO), to build a mass media entertainment complex on the site. By May 1930, RCA and its affiliates had agreed to develop the site.

=== Development ===
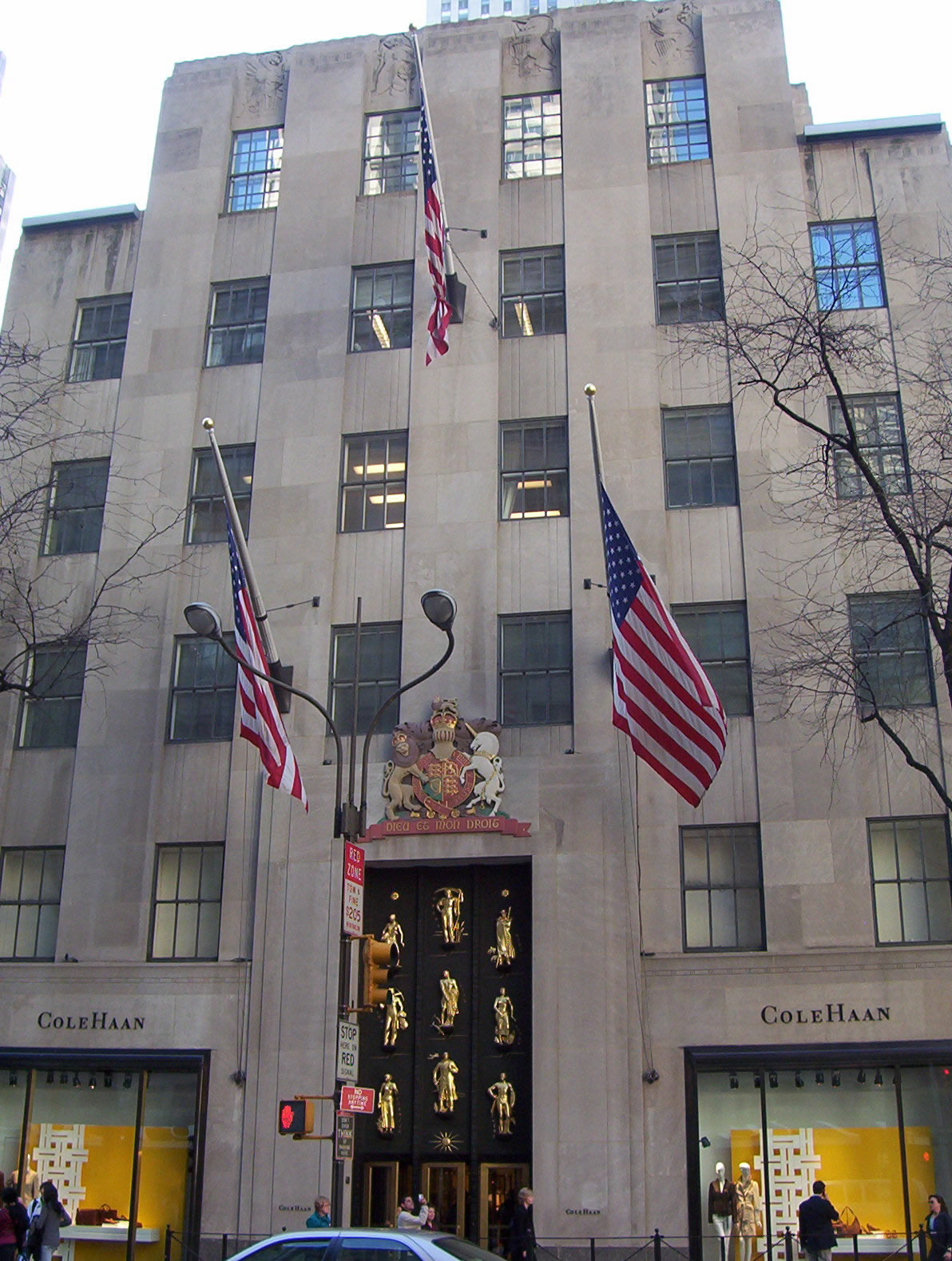
Fifth Avenue facade

One proposal for Rockefeller Center, revealed in March 1930, included an oval retail building on Fifth Avenue between 49th and 50th Streets, whose top floors would contain Chase National Bank offices. A refined proposal, announced in March 1931, called for a rooftop garden atop the oval building. The public criticized the revised plan and saw the oval building in particular as clashing with other designs on Fifth Avenue. The oval building was scrapped in early 1931 after Chase withdrew from the project. It was replaced by a pair of six-story retail buildings between 49th and 50th Streets, as well as a 41-story tower on the block to the north. Because the canceled oval building had contained rooftop gardens, Raymond Hood suggested the idea for rooftop gardens across the complex, including on all of the retail buildings. These gardens would be curated by Ralph Hancock.

As American tenants were reluctant to rent in these retail buildings, Rockefeller Center manager Hugh Robertson, formerly of Todd, Robertson and Todd, suggested foreign tenants for the buildings. The complex's managers promoted Rockefeller Center as a "hub for international trade". Rockefeller Center's managers held talks with prospective Czech, German, Italian, and Swedish lessees who could potentially occupy the six-story internationally themed buildings on Fifth Avenue. Dutch, Chinese, Japanese, and Russian tenants were also reportedly considered. The British government leased the building in January 1932, making it the first themed building for which an agreement was made. The building was to be a free port, with all of its merchandise being exempted from tariffs, and it would host the governmental and commercial ventures of the United Kingdom. The seventh-story penthouse above the building was added late in the design process.

Excavation for the sites of the British Empire Building and La Maison Francaise began in February 1932. Within two months, more than 28,000 cubic yards (21,000 m^{3}) of dirt had been excavated. Work on the buildings temporarily stopped in May 1932 because of a labor strike. A groundbreaking ceremony for the British Empire Building was held on July 2, 1932, when Francis Hopwood, 1st Baron Southborough, placed the cornerstone. The British Building's structural steel started construction in October of that year. The building topped out on November 15, 1932, just sixteen workdays after steel contractors Post & McCord had started erecting the superstructure. Afterward, construction contractors Barr, Irons & Lane continued to fit out the building. Jennewein's ornamentation was installed the next January. By early April 1933, the building's plastering and tilework were completed. That month, the New York Building Congress hosted a ceremony on the second floor, giving craftsmanship awards to 27 workers who were involved in the project. Lawrie was hired to create the decorative panels for the building's facade that June.

=== 1930s to 1970s ===
A two-story free port under the British Empire Building was announced in October 1933. The next month, cigarette brand Dunhill opened a three-story tobacco and specialty store in the building, with a mural by Arthur Crisp and the world's largest conditioned humidor. Other early tenants included perfumer Yardley London, furniture store Arundell Clarke Ltd., the Empire Galleries art gallery, Imperial Airways, and the Canadian Department of Trade and Commerce. By the beginning of 1935, the British Empire Building was 91 percent occupied. The building also hosted exhibits such as a display of Ethiopian coins and a model-boat show. Rockefeller Center celebrated the building's first anniversary in October 1935 with a "cocktail and tea party" featuring actor Roland Young. The last vacant space in the British Empire Building was leased by British company Aluminum Ltd. in April 1937, making it the first building in Rockefeller Center to be fully leased.

Among the tenants that moved into the British Empire Building in the 1940s were gift store The Waldrons (which expanded its space four times in two years); jewelry firm Staiger & May; shipbuilding magnate Henry J. Kaiser; the Canadian consulate general in New York City; and shoe store Hanan & Son. In addition, a memorial to Anzac fighters in World War I opened within the rooftop garden in 1942. Even during World War II, the building was recorded as being fully occupied in 1944. After World War II, Rockefeller Center sought to add air conditioning to its original structures, as this feature was already in place in newer buildings. The British Empire Building and La Maison Francaise already had cooling systems, which were upgraded. Columbia University was tasked with installing air conditioning in the buildings. The onset of the Korean War in 1950 delayed the project but, by the next year, Columbia had acquiesced to reimbursing Rockefeller Center Inc. for the installation.

In the 1950s, menswear retailer Whitehouse and Hardy leased a store in the British Empire Building, and Japan Air Lines opened executive offices there. Additionally, Anzac Day commemorations were hosted at the building each year; though the holiday fell on April 25 each year, the celebrations could only take place on weekends due to lease stipulations. Leon Barmache redesigned the Yardley London store in the building in 1963. Shirt maker Custom Shop, a Magnavox "entertainment center", and jewelry shop Ordiam also occupied space at the British Empire Building in the 1970s. A gallery named Nikon House was also operating within the British Empire Building by the early 1980s. The building was also upgraded in the early 1980s to comply with more stringent fire-safety regulations.

=== 1980s and 1990s ===
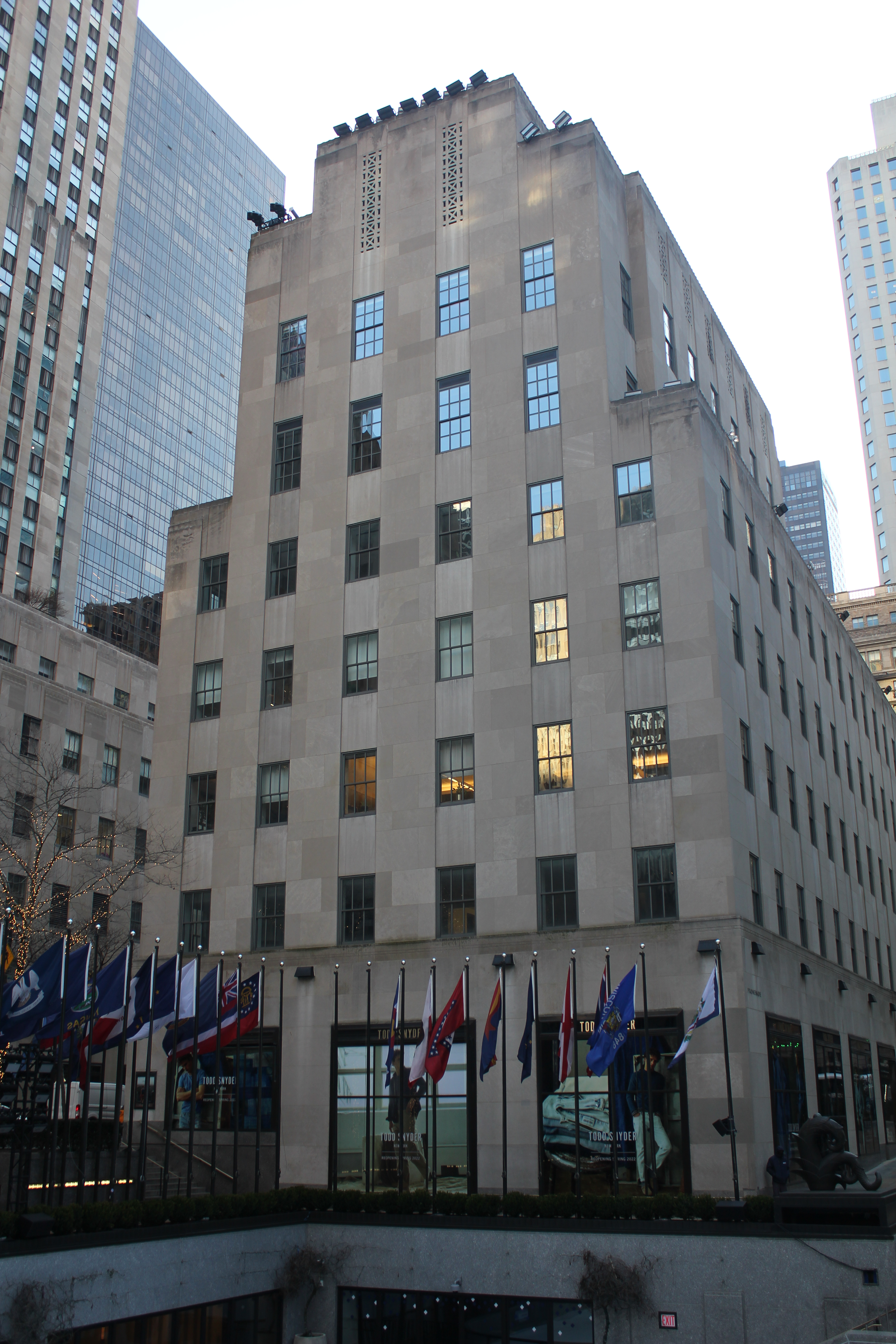
View of the building's Lower Plaza elevation

Columbia University was not making enough money from Rockefeller Center leases by the 1970s, and the university started looking to sell the land beneath Rockefeller Center, including the International Building, in 1983. That year, the New York City Landmarks Preservation Commission (LPC) held hearings to determine how much of Rockefeller Center should be protected as a landmark. The Rockefeller family and Columbia University acknowledged that the buildings were already symbolically landmarks, but their spokesman John E. Zuccotti recommended that only the block between 49th and 50th Streets be protected, including the British Empire Building. (Note: Namely 1250 Avenue of the Americas, 30 Rockefeller Plaza, the British Empire Building, La Maison Francaise, the Channel Gardens, and the Lower Plaza) By contrast, almost everyone else who supported Rockefeller Center's landmark status recommended that the entire complex be landmarked. The LPC granted landmark status to the exteriors of all of the original complex's buildings, as well as the interiors of two lobbies, on April 23, 1985. (Note: The final landmark designation covers 12 buildings as well as the Channel Gardens, Rockefeller Plaza, and Lower Plaza. These are 1230, 1250, and 1270 Avenue of the Americas; 1, 10, 30, 50, and 75 Rockefeller Plaza; the British Empire Building; the International Building; La Maison Francaise; and Radio City Music Hall. The lobbies of the International Building and 30 Rockefeller Plaza were also protected.) Rockefeller Center's original buildings also became a National Historic Landmark in 1987.

Meanwhile, Columbia had agreed to sell the land to the Rockefeller Group for $400 million in February 1985. The Rockefeller Group formed Rockefeller Center Inc. that July to manage the British Empire Building and other properties. The Hudson-Shatz Painting Company also restored Jennewein's cartouche and gold-leaf figures above the British Empire Building's entrance in 1985, coating these with a 23-karat layer of gold. The Dunhill humidor room, which had operated continuously since the building's opening, was downsized later that year due to increasing rents. During 1987, the roof gardens were restored at a cost of $48,000 for each garden. Mitsubishi Estate, a real estate company of the Mitsubishi Group, purchased a majority stake in the Rockefeller Group in 1988, including the British Empire Building and Rockefeller Center's other structures. Subsequently, the Rockefeller Group transferred some of the unused air rights above the British Empire Building and La Maison Francaise to the Rockefeller Plaza West skyscraper on Seventh Avenue. In exchange, the Rockefeller Group had to preserve the original buildings between 49th and 50th Streets under a more stringent set of regulations than the rest of the complex.

The Rockefeller Group filed for bankruptcy protection in May 1995 after missing several mortgage payments. That November, John Rockefeller Jr.'s son David and a consortium led by Goldman Sachs agreed to buy Rockefeller Center's buildings for $1.1 billion, beating out Sam Zell and other bidders. The transaction included $306 million for the mortgage and $845 million for other expenses. A preservation dispute arose in May 1998, when the owners announced plans to enlarge shop windows on the center's Fifth Avenue buildings to two stories. The window sizes were reduced upon the LPC's request, and the modifications were approved in September 1998.

=== 2000s to present ===
Tishman Speyer, led by David Rockefeller's close friend Jerry Speyer and the Lester Crown family of Chicago, bought the original 14 buildings and land in December 2000 for $1.85 billion, including the British Empire Building. Anzac Day celebrations continued to be hosted on the roof through the 21st century. In addition, a Lego Store replaced a Brookstone appliance store in the building in 2010, and teahouse chain TeaGschwendner opened a store the same year. A Victorinox Swiss Army knife store opened in the building in 2016.

In January 2020, Tishman Speyer hired Gabellini Sheppard Associates to design a renovation for Channel Gardens, Rockefeller Plaza, and the Lower Plaza. These plans included modifications to lighting, planting, pathways, and facades, such as the storefronts of La Maison Francaise and the British Empire Building. The plans were approved that April.
