= 608 Fifth Avenue =

Office building in Manhattan, New York

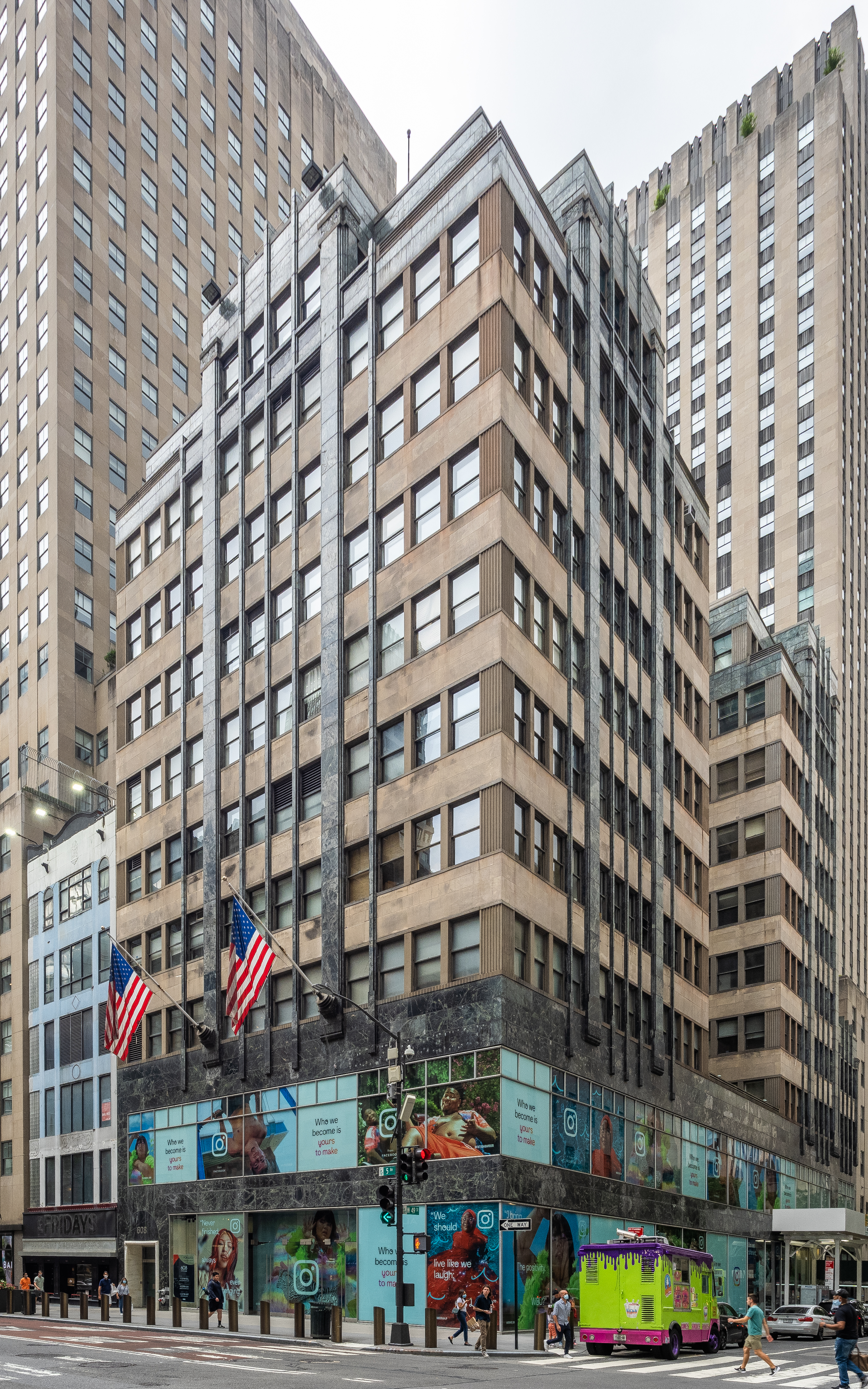
- Alternative names: Goelet Building, Swiss Center Building

General information
- Architectural style: Art Deco
- Location: 608 Fifth Avenue, Midtown Manhattan, New York City, United States
- Coordinates: 40°45′29″N 73°58′42″W
- Construction started: 1930
- Completed: 1932

Height
- Height: 132 feet 11 inches (40.51 m)

Technical details
- Floor count: 10

Design and construction
- Architect: Victor L.S. Hafner

New York City Landmark
- Designated: January 14, 1992
- Reference no.: 1810
- Designated entity: Exterior

New York City Landmark
- Designated: January 14, 1992
- Reference no.: 1811
- Designated entity: Lobby interior

Buildings of Rockefeller Center
Buildings and structures in Rockefeller Center:
1 1 Rockefeller Plaza
2 10 Rockefeller Plaza
3 La Maison Francaise
4 British Empire Building
5 30 Rockefeller Plaza
6 International Building
7 50 Rockefeller Plaza
8 1230 Avenue of the Americas
9 Radio City Music Hall
10 1270 Avenue of the Americas
11 75 Rockefeller Plaza
12 600 Fifth Avenue
13 608 Fifth Avenue
14 1271 Avenue of the Americas
15 1251 Avenue of the Americas
16 1221 Avenue of the Americas
17 1211 Avenue of the Americas

608 Fifth Avenue, also known as the Goelet Building or Swiss Center Building, is an office building at Fifth Avenue and West 49th Street in the Midtown Manhattan neighborhood of New York City, adjacent to Rockefeller Center. It was designed by Victor L. S. Hafner for the Goelet family, with Edward Hall Faile as structural engineer. The facade uses elements of both the Art Deco and International styles, while the lobby is designed exclusively in the Art Deco style.

The building consists of a two-story base and an eight-story upper section, with a facade of green and white marble. The base includes storefronts while the upper stories contain offices. The second story is cantilevered from the bottom of the third story so the storefronts could be combined into a large department store if necessary. The building's elaborately designed lobby is divided into an entrance vestibule, an S-shaped outer lobby, and an elevator lobby. These spaces are decorated extensively with marble and aluminum, and the outer and elevator lobbies also include the Goelet family's crest. The three elevator cabs contain ornate marble and aluminum decorations.

Prior to the construction of the present office building, Mary and Ogden Goelet lived in a mansion at 608 Fifth Avenue. The mansion was torn down in 1930, and Ogden's nephew Robert Walton Goelet built the office building on the site, which was finished in 1932. The structure was built while the construction of Rockefeller Center was ongoing, and its design was meant to complement that of the other buildings in Rockefeller Center. During the 1960s, the building was sold to the Korein family and was renovated. 608 Fifth Avenue was renamed the Swiss Center Building in 1966 after several Swiss companies leased space there. Both the lobby interior and the exterior were designated by the New York City Landmarks Preservation Commission as official city landmarks in 1992. The leasehold was sold to RFR Holding in 1998, and Vornado Realty Trust operated the retail space from 2013 to 2020.

== Site ==
608 Fifth Avenue is in the Midtown Manhattan neighborhood of New York City, on the southwestern corner of Fifth Avenue and 49th Street. The land lot is slightly L-shaped, covering 13,150 square feet (1,222 m^{2}). The lot measures 70 feet (21 m) on Fifth Avenue to the east and 161.6 feet (49.3 m) on 49th Street to the north. The longer leg of the "L" extends west–east along 49th Street, while a shorter leg extends north–south along the western portion of the site.

608 Fifth Avenue is one of three buildings on the western side of Fifth Avenue between 48th and 49th Streets. Directly to the south is the Childs Restaurants building at 604 Fifth Avenue. The southern side of the block, 600 Fifth Avenue, was built in 1949–1952 and was later incorporated into Rockefeller Center. Other nearby buildings include 600 Fifth Avenue to the south, 1 Rockefeller Plaza to the west, the British Empire Building to the north, the Saks Fifth Avenue flagship store to the northeast, and 597 Fifth Avenue to the southeast.

Fifth Avenue between 42nd Street and Central Park South (59th Street) was relatively undeveloped through the late 19th century. In the latter half of that century, mansions and other residences were constructed along the avenue. Among these were two country mansions that Edward H. Kendall designed for brothers Robert and Ogden Goelet, within one block of each other. The brothers were part of the Goelet family, a wealthy French Huguenot family that had founded the Chemical Bank. Robert's estate was at 589 Fifth Avenue, near present-day 48th Street, while Ogden's estate was at 608 Fifth Avenue one block north.

== Architecture ==
608 Fifth Avenue is a ten-story building in the Art Deco style, with elements of the International Style. It was designed by Victor L. S. Hafner and built by structural engineering firm E. H. Faile & Co. The planning application to the city's Department of Buildings was submitted by Roy Clinton Morris on behalf of Edward Hall Faile, leading to occasional disputes over who was the building's architect. Hafner worked for Faile for one and a half years. Although Hafner had worked on several projects in New York City, the Goelet Building was the only such design mentioned by name in his New York Times obituary in 1947.

=== Form and facade ===
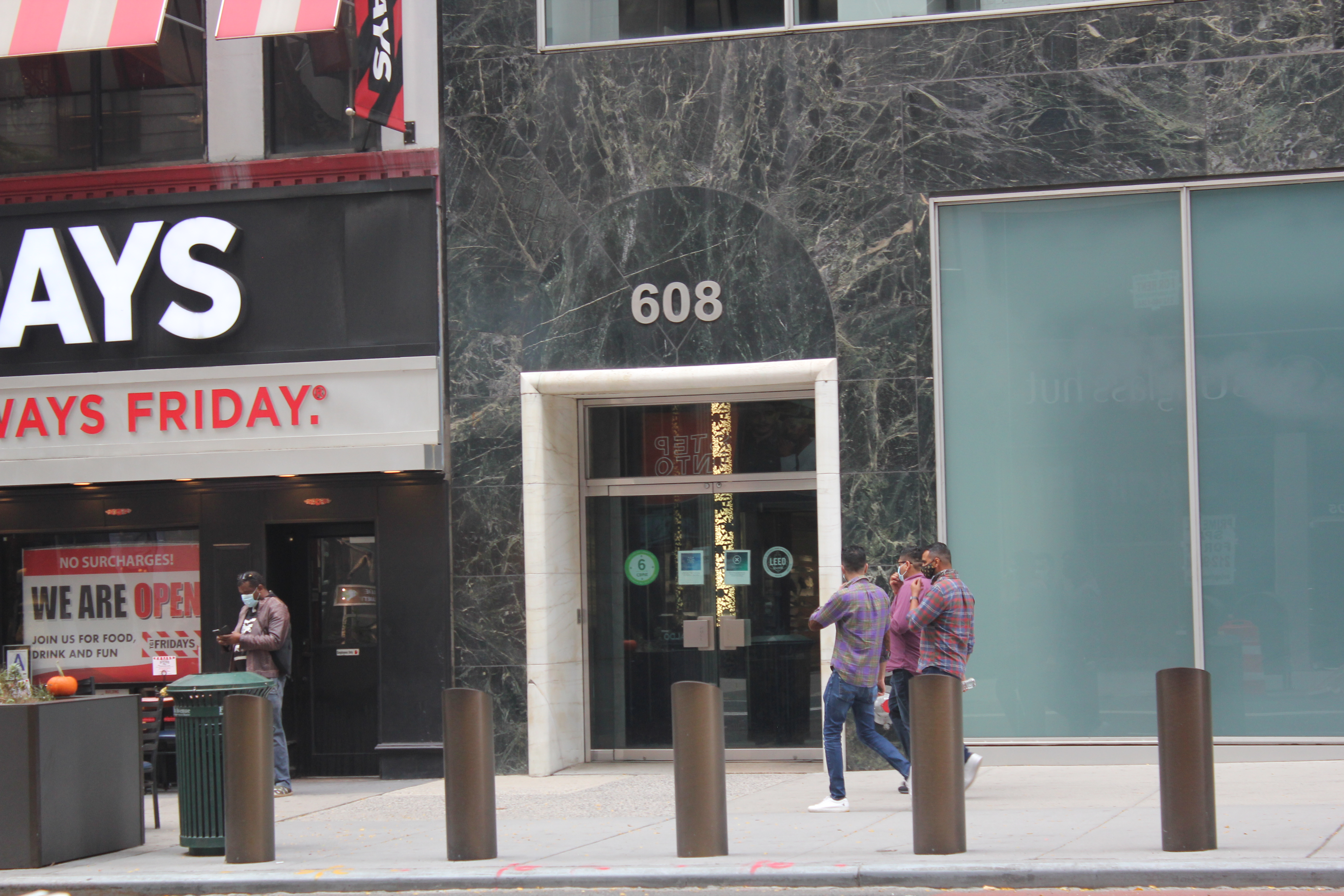
Entrance on Fifth Avenue

The facades at the first story and the second-level mezzanine are composed of glass curtain walls. Green marble fills the spaces between each floor. From the outset, 608 Fifth Avenue was designed as a commercial structure that would maximize the rapidly rising land value of the area, with retail on the lower floors and office stories above. At the time, retail space was more profitable per square foot than office space was. The retail space required large display windows facing the street, which were extremely profitable. To maximize the surface area of these show windows, Faile designed the third and higher stories on two-story-tall columns that are recessed 5 feet (1.5 m) from the facade. An archway surrounded with green marble is placed along the western end of the 49th Street facade. A metal screen, painted bronze, is at the second story.

The building has a recessed light court above the second story on 49th Street, allowing additional windows to be placed further inside the building. Faile engineered the building's columns to be strong enough to accommodate a possible conversion of the light court into additional office space.

The exterior of the upper stories is made of two main types of marble. The horizontal spandrel panels between each story are made of white marble, and the vertical piers are made of green marble. On both Fifth Avenue and 49th Street, the piers divide the facade into sets of three bays, each with multiple windows. The Fifth Avenue elevation contains one set of three bays, while the 49th Street elevation includes two sets of three bays (one on either side of the light court). Most of the building is nine stories high, but the central bay of each set rises to a dormer on the tenth story. The central bays' windows are separated by four green-marble "ribs", which frame the tenth-story dormers. The tenth story and penthouse are sheathed in green marble, and the penthouse has white trim lines.

Ornamentation on the exterior includes aluminum mullions on the windows and at the corners. Other decorative elements include a monogram consisting of interlocked letters "G", as well as the Goelet family crest of a swan. These elements are displayed above the second story on the Fifth Avenue elevation. The crest and monogram were hung above the original main entrance arch on Fifth Avenue, demolished in 1965, as well as the arched entryway on 49th Street. The original main entrance had a bronze door with the Goelet family's crest and reportedly cost $14,000 (equivalent to $330,366 in 2025).

=== Interior ===
According to the New York City Department of City Planning, 608 Fifth Avenue has 127,558 square feet (11,850.5 m^{2}) of gross floor area, with 55 units.

==== Lobby ====
The building's lobby was designed in a full Art Deco style, as Victor Hafner was not constrained by the need to conform the building's interior to those of nearby buildings. The lobby is reached from a doorway on the southernmost portion of the Fifth Avenue facade. Various marbles are used, including what The New York Times described as "aurora rossa, samosa golden, American pavonazzo, bleu belge, numidian red and Belgian black". The lobby is composed of three primary spaces: an entrance vestibule to the southeast, an S-shaped outer lobby, and an elevator lobby to the west.

The entrance vestibule has strips of veined gray marble, running diagonally toward the room's corners. The floor is surrounded by a rectangular band of white-and-black marble. The bottoms of the entrance vestibule's walls contain red-marble baseboards. Above those are black-marble wall panels with white veining, which are placed at regular intervals. Vertical aluminum battens hold these panels in place. The ceiling is made of aluminum painted in a bronze color. Art Deco motifs, inspired by both natural and geometric patterns, are placed on the ceiling and walls. Illumination is provided by four aluminum grilles, one at each corner of the vestibule, which are decorated with curving foliate patterns.

A set of three swinging silver doors leads from the vestibule to the outer lobby. The doors contain symmetrical patterned designs, with three triangles at the top of each door and stepped patterns at the bottom. The outer lobby's travertine floor is surrounded by a black marble band and a deep-red marble band. The west and east walls contain reeded dark-marble pilasters. The walls contain wide horizontal bands of beige marble with white and brown veins, interspersed with narrower bands of brown marble with yellow veins. These bands are separated by aluminum battens. Stylized motifs are cast into the aluminum cornices above each wall. Lighting fixtures are placed behind the cornices. The outer lobby has a coved plaster ceiling with aluminum-leaf decorations. Inlaid in the middle of the ceiling is a depiction of the Goelet swan, surrounded by geometric patterns.

The floors, walls, and ceiling of the elevator lobby are similar to those in the outer lobby, with a floral motif at the center of the ceiling. The elevator lobby contains three openings for elevators, as well as a staircase to the floors above. Each elevator opening is recessed from the wall surface and flanked by reeded dark-marble pilasters. The soffits of the elevator openings contain indirect lighting sources, which shine onto the cast-metal doors. The elevator doors themselves are decorated with stylized leaves atop vertical bands of white and yellow metal. The centers of the doors contain octagonal medallions, which depict a gazelle and two maidens. The elevator openings and the staircase are all topped by decorative octagonal medallions made of metal. Each elevator cab has baked enamel wall panels, held in place by aluminum bands, as well as stylized aluminum motifs.

==== Retail space ====
The construction of Rockefeller Center made it difficult to forecast whether numerous small stores or a single large retailer would be more suitable for the site. 608 Fifth Avenue included features such as wide staircases and fire sprinklers, as well as a 17-foot-tall (5.2 m) ceiling in the rear of the first floor. This allowed the retail space to be converted into a department store easily. When the second story was built, it was cantilevered from the third-story slab instead of being supported by columns above the first floor, thus maximizing the first-floor retail space. In total, the retail space covers 44,000 square feet (4,100 m^{2}).

== History ==
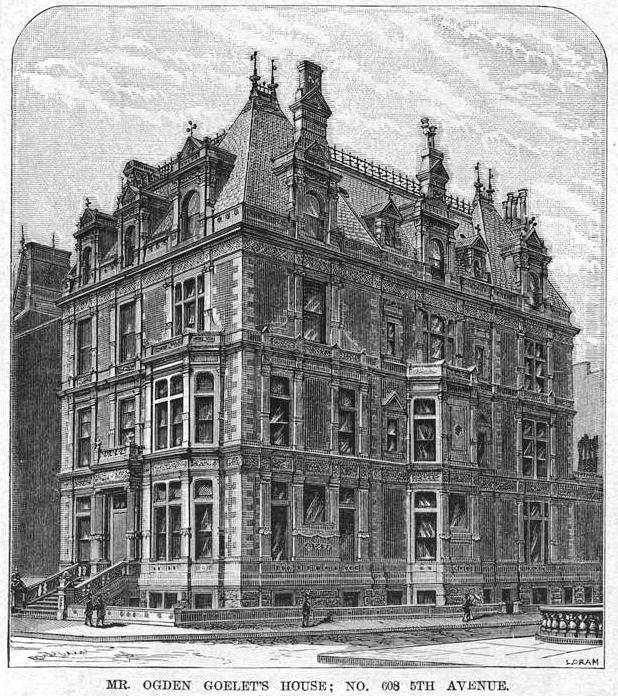
Ogden Goelet's mansion at 608 Fifth Avenue, designed by E.H. Kendall

By the beginning of the 20th century, most of the area's mansions had given way to office and commercial buildings. When Ogden Goelet died in 1897, his widow inherited his property at 608 Fifth Avenue, while his brother Robert became the trustee, a role later passed to Robert's son Robert Walton Goelet. In 1920, Robert Walton Goelet commissioned the construction of an art gallery at 606 Fifth Avenue, directly south of Ogden's estate. Ogden's widow Mary R. Goelet continued to live in the 608 Fifth Avenue mansion until 1926.

=== Development ===
By the time Mary died in February 1929, the house had been unused for three years. By then, the construction of Rockefeller Center was ongoing in the area immediately surrounding the Goelet lots. Rockefeller Center's developers allowed Robert Walton Goelet to keep the lots at 2–6 West 49th Street because the company considered his "interest and concern" to be a significant factor. However, Goelet could not yet develop the western part of his site due to an easement that a neighbor held on the land. Goelet started selling the objects in the house in December 1929, hosting four such sales.

The house and adjacent art gallery were demolished in March 1930. Plans for a commercial building were filed with the New York City Department of Buildings the same month. By that May, Goelet was still deciding between two different plans for a 15-story building. Though both options included office space above a two-story retail area, only one of the options provided space for a showroom. In November 1930, the East River Savings Bank gave Goelet a $1 million mortgage for the project. The plans for the current 10-story commercial building were announced the next month. At the beginning of 1931, Fifth Avenue was experiencing high demand for storefront space, with only 12 of 224 stores being unoccupied. 608 Fifth Avenue, along with 500 Fifth Avenue and the Empire State Building, were expected to add a combined 11 stores. In June 1930, Robert Walton Goelet hosted a ceremony to give craftsmanship awards to 23 workers who were involved in the project.

=== Early years ===
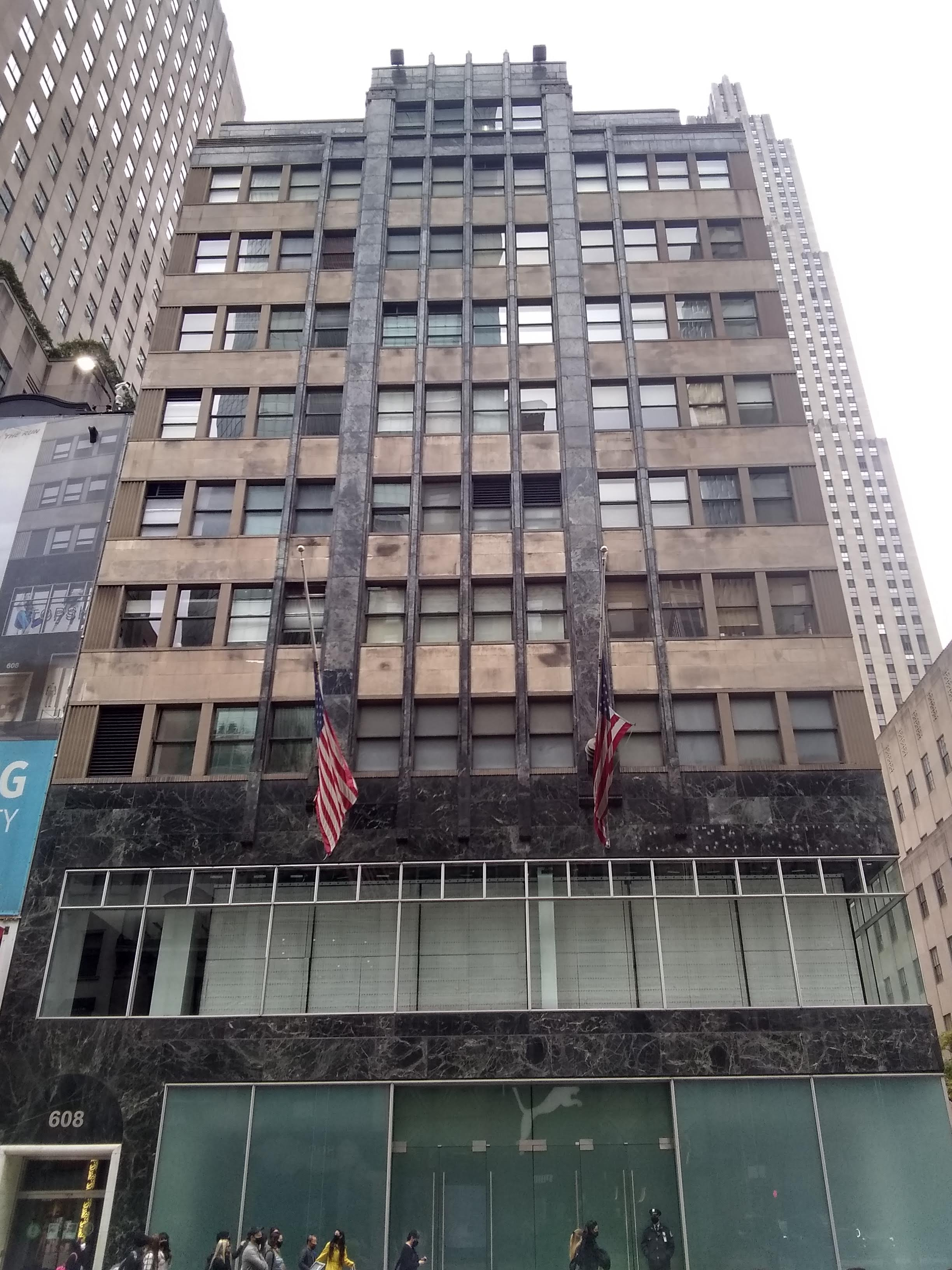
View of the Fifth Avenue facade

The building was completed by 1932 but, due to a lack of interest from large tenants, the ground-floor space was divided into smaller units. Within the area bounded by Sixth and Fifth Avenues between 48th and 51st Streets, the Goelet Building was among the few plots that was not owned outright by Rockefeller Center's developers by the end of 1932. According to contemporary photographs of 608 Fifth Avenue, the ground floor was first occupied by several small stores. These included brokers Cowan & Co., restaurant operator Susan C. Palmer, the Tecla Pearl Company, and a Manufacturers Hanover Corporation bank branch. The earliest office tenants included jewelry firm Theodore A. Kohn & Son Galleries, photography studios Underwood & Underwood, and several gem dealers. The Kohn Galleries also hosted art exhibitions in its offices. Goelet had his offices in the tenth-floor penthouse.

In 1935, Robert W. Goelet bought Charles J. Coulter's house at 6 West 49th Street for $82,000, initially to preserve the Goelet Building's exposure to natural light. The next year, Goelet filed plans for a western annex on that site. E. H. Faile designed the annex, while the Starrett Corporation received the general construction contract. The four-story annex was built as an extension of the Goelet Building, with all access being through the main building, but it could also be arranged as its own structure, with provisions for the installation of separate elevators and stairs. Banks Custom Tailors leased most of the second-floor retail space in 1937, and J.S. Bache & Co. moved into a portion of the second story the same year. At the end of the decade, jewelers Rimler and Horning took a large portion of the retail space. The building's tenants in the 1940s included watch dealers Louis Manheimer & Brothers and gem importers Lieberman & Bienenfeld. After Manufacturers Hanover announced its intention to relocate its bank branch in 1941, men's store John David Inc. leased the bank's three-story former space in 1945. John David continued to occupy the building through for the next two decades.

Tenants during the 1950s included the Jewelry Industry Council, wool-trade group Woolens and Worsteds of America, the Institute of Boiler and Radiator Manufacturers, and airline Avianca. Diamond dealers Eichberg Co. and the Colombian Tourist Board also leased offices in the early 1960s. The Space Design Group redesigned one of the building's offices for Pakistan International Airlines in 1962, decorating the offices with green-and-blue wall tiles sprayed with cork, as well as green-and-white onyx chips embedded in the concrete floor. The Fifth Avenue Association, a local civic group, recognized the Pakistan International Airlines office as the area's "best storefront alteration" during 1962–1963. The Korein family acquired the building and its underlying land during the 1960s.

=== Swiss Center Building ===
608 Fifth Avenue became the Swiss Center Building in 1964 when fourteen Swiss-owned enterprises formed a coalition to "foster commercial, cultural, travel and financial activities identified with Switzerland". The companies signed a 17-year lease for the structure with options for a 45-year extension. Following that announcement, Robert Goelet signed a lease for space in another building, relocating from 608 Fifth Avenue. Lester Tichy was hired to redesign both the interior and exterior of the first and second floors. Former Swiss president Friedrich Wahlen dedicated the new Swiss Center on June 23, 1966, during a citywide "Swiss Week". The ground-floor tenants were replaced by offices for the Swiss National Tourist Office, Swiss Bank Corporation, and Swissair. By 1970, the Swiss Center Restaurant had opened within the building at 4 West 49th Street; the eatery was sponsored by the Swiss government.

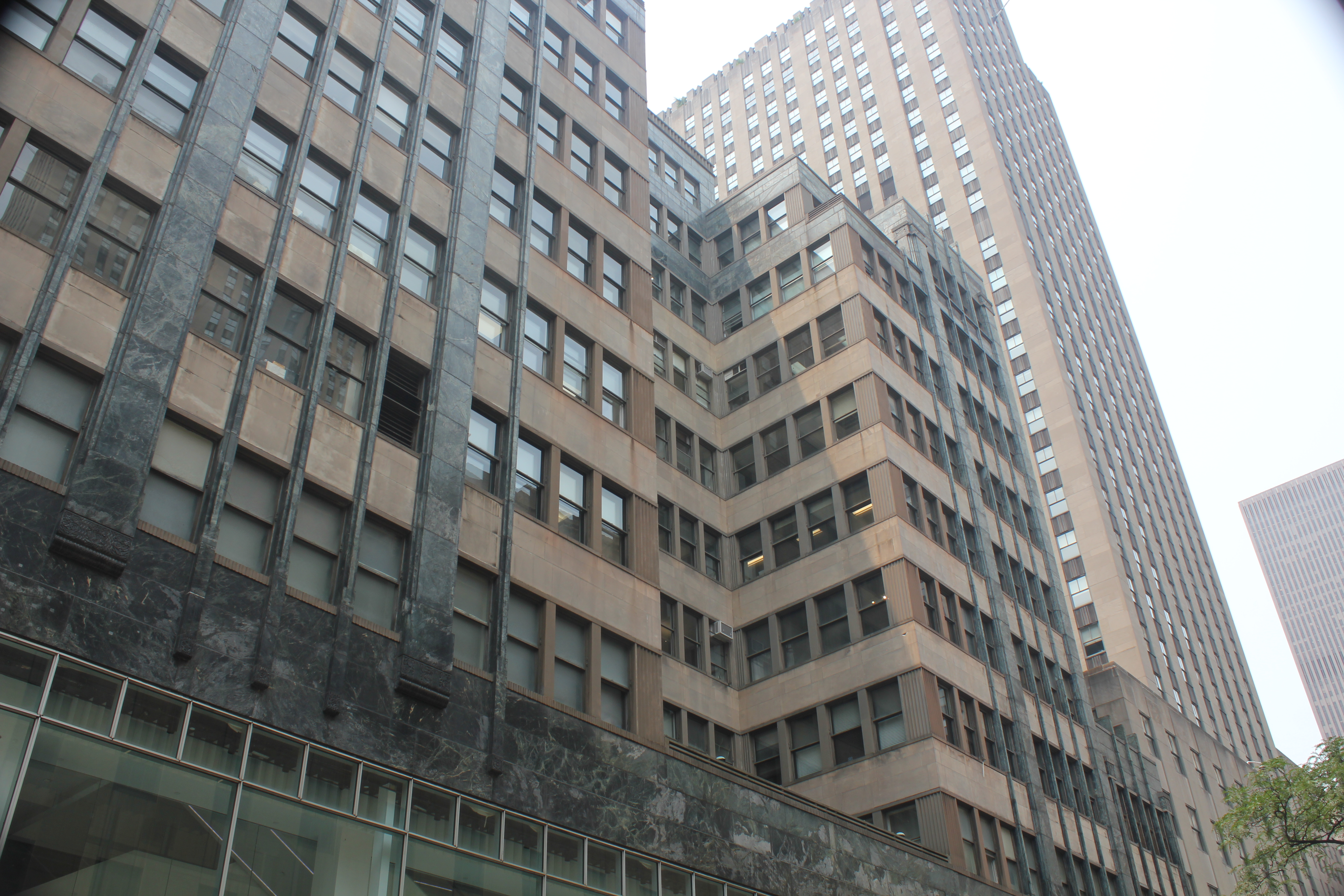
49th Street facade

In the early 1980s, the New York City Landmarks Preservation Commission (LPC) and the American Society of Interior Designers examined the Swiss Center Building's lobby as part of a citywide survey of historic interiors. A volunteer for the survey described the lobby as "one of the richest Art Deco spaces anywhere". The LPC first considered the building and its lobby for New York City landmark status in 1983. The building's then-owner Sarah Korein objected, as she wanted to expand the building by several stories once the Swiss Center's lease expired in 1996. Despite this, 608 Fifth Avenue and its interior were designated as official city landmarks in 1992; the LPC noted in its reports that "the owner and long-term lessee are not opposed to the designation". Jewelry retailer Mikimoto occupied a large retail space on the ground floor until 1995. Two years later, Garrison & Siegel renovated the lower floors to their original design.

=== RFR and Vornado operation ===
The leasehold was sold to RFR Holding, a company held by German investors, in 1998 for about $22 million, though Korein retained ownership of the land. Aby Rosen of RFR planned to renovate the building for $1.5 million. Although the building was fully occupied, Rosen wished to seek higher rents; at the time, average rents at 608 Fifth Avenue were around $45 per square foot ($480/m^{2}), compared with $55 per square foot ($590/m^{2}) for similar Midtown buildings. Switzerland Tourism continued to operate an office in the building, as did confectionery Minamoto Kitchoan. Clothing company Lacoste opened a store at 608 Fifth Avenue in 2003, and Japanese jeweler Niwaka opened a store in 2006. Lacoste expanded its store into the Niwaka space in 2011. This was part of a southward expansion of retail on Fifth Avenue in the early 2010s.

Vornado Realty Trust assumed RFR's mortgage in 2013 and paid $8.5 million that RFR owed on the mortgage. At that point, the Korein family still owned the land under 608 Fifth Avenue. The next year, clothing retailer Topshop announced that it would lease the retail space for $15 million, replacing the Lacoste store. Topshop sought to sublease its space by 2018, and the store there closed in 2020 because Topshop went bankrupt. In June 2020, Vornado gave up its lease on the building. The deal generated $70 million for Vornado, which at the time was experiencing financial losses due to the COVID-19 pandemic in New York City. By 2021, the empty storefront was being used to advertise HBO Max's release of the film No Sudden Move; it also hosted New York Fashion Week the same year. Fashion retailer Aritzia leased a 33,000-square-foot (3,100 m^{2}) storefront at the building in mid-2022, opening a store there in December 2024.

== Reception ==
Robert Goelet felt that "the building had to be one of beauty and of durability in addition to being modern". Christopher Gray, writing for The New York Times in 1990, referred to 608 Fifth Avenue as "one giant Art Moderne cigarette case of marble". Joseph Giovannini, another Times writer, listed 608 Fifth Avenue's lobby in 1984 as part of a walking tour of the "city's best lobbies". The New Yorker architectural critic Lewis Mumford sarcastically described 608 Fifth Avenue as "an excellent period reproduction—Modernique, 1925", regarding it as little more than a parody of the earlier Childs Restaurant building. Robert A. M. Stern, in his book New York 1930, called the building "a luxuriously detailed but bastardized interpretation of the International Style". In 2017, architectural historian Anthony W. Robins wrote that the Goelet Building's lobby was "one of New York's best-kept Deco secrets".

== See also ==
- Art Deco architecture of New York City
- List of New York City Designated Landmarks in Manhattan from 14th to 59th Streets
