= Saks Fifth Avenue flagship store =

Department store in Manhattan, New York

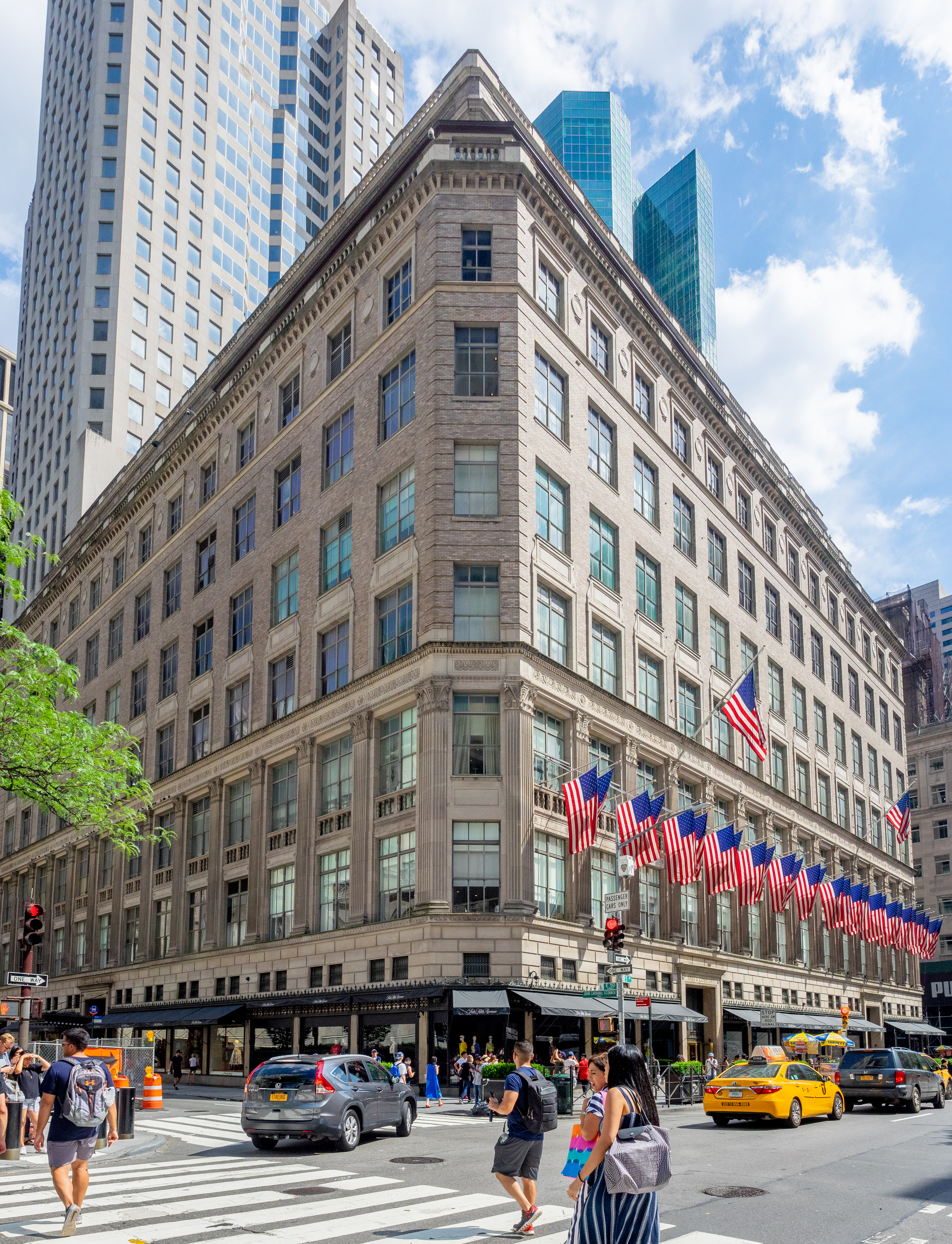
- Interactive map of the Saks Fifth Avenue flagship store area

General information
- Architectural style: Neo-Renaissance; Palazzo
- Location: 611 and 623 Fifth Avenue, Manhattan, New York
- Coordinates: 40°45′29″N 73°58′37″W
- Opened: 1924 (611 Fifth Avenue); 1990 (623 Fifth Avenue)
- Owner: Saks Fifth Avenue (store); Vornado Realty Trust (remainder of 623 Fifth Avenue)

Design and construction
- Architects: Starrett & van Vleck; Lee Harris Pomeroy Associates and Abramovitz Kingsland Schiff (expansion)

Website
- www.saksfifthavenue.com

New York City Landmark
- Designated: December 29, 1984
- Reference no.: 1523

The Saks Fifth Avenue flagship store is a department store on Fifth Avenue between 49th and 50th Streets in Midtown Manhattan, New York City. The original 10-story structure at 611 Fifth Avenue has served as the flagship store of Saks Fifth Avenue since its completion in 1924. The store also occupies part of 623 Fifth Avenue, a 36-story tower completed in 1990.

The original Saks Fifth Avenue Building was designed by Starrett & van Vleck in the classical style. It contains a facade made of Indiana limestone, brick, and cast-stone, with chamfered corners on Fifth Avenue at 49th and 50th Streets. Saks Fifth Avenue was the first department store on Fifth Avenue to comply with the 1916 Zoning Resolution, with setbacks on its upper floors. The tower addition at 623 Fifth Avenue was designed by Lee Harris Pomeroy Associates and Abramovitz Kingsland Schiff. The tower is partially designed in the style of the original structure.

The Saks Fifth Avenue Building was planned in the early 20th century by Horace Saks, head of Saks & Company, which had a flagship store at Herald Square. The building was constructed from 1922 to 1924 as "Saks-Fifth Avenue", a joint venture between Saks and his cousin Bernard Gimbel. Saks Fifth Avenue later became a department store chain in its own right, and the Fifth Avenue store became a flagship location. The original building became a New York City designated landmark in 1984. The 623 Fifth Avenue tower annex was built shortly thereafter, providing additional space for the flagship store. Over the years, the store has undergone numerous modifications.

== Architecture ==
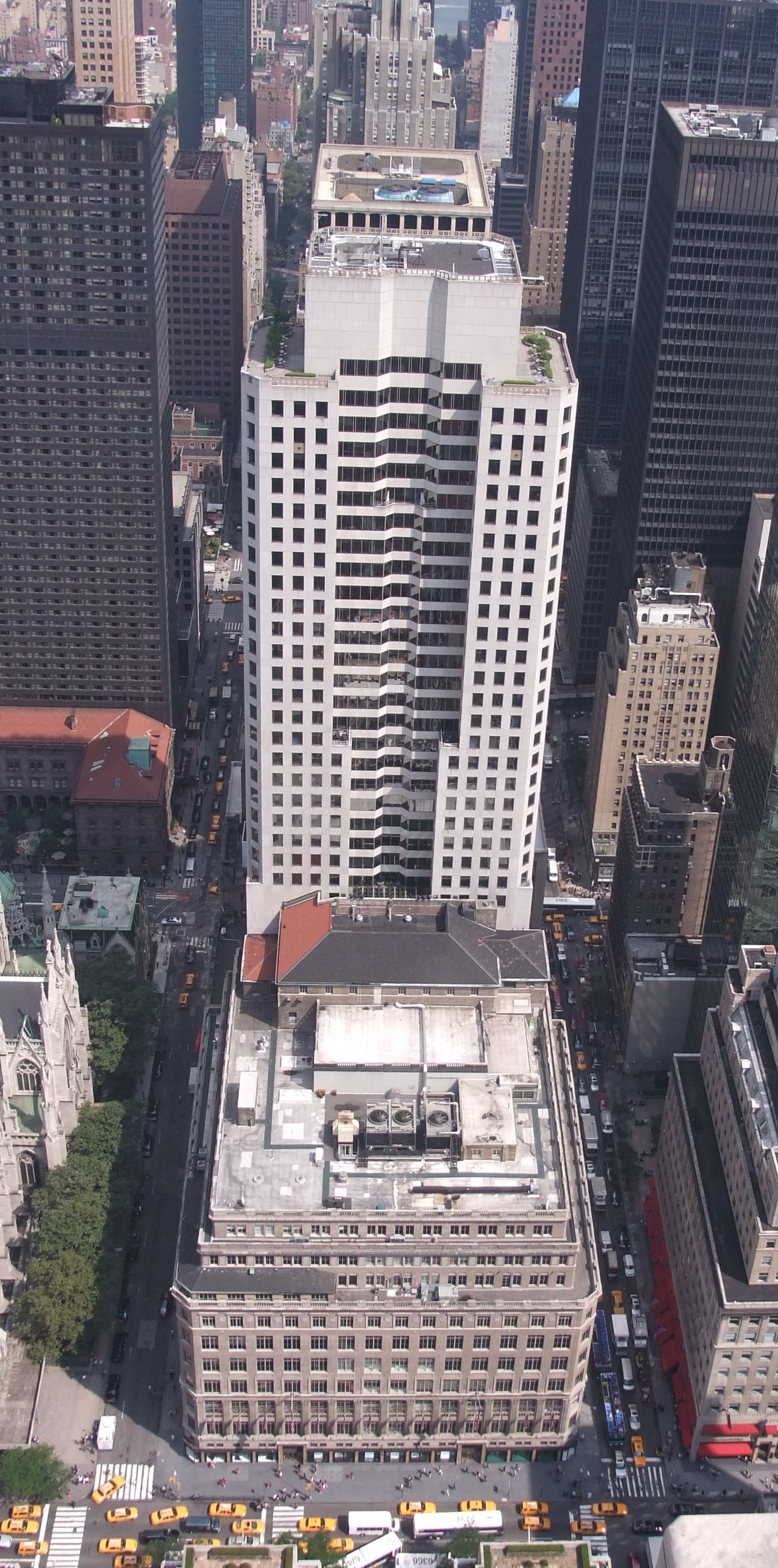
Aerial view of 611 and 623 Fifth Avenue

Saks Fifth Avenue spans two structures: The original store is at 611 Fifth Avenue, built in 1924, and there is an extension at 623 Fifth Avenue, a 36-story tower built in 1990. Saks co-developed the tower and operates ten of its floors. The building is abutted by 18 East 50th Street to the east. It is across 50th Street from St. Patrick's Cathedral and across Fifth Avenue from the Rockefeller Center complex, both National Historic Landmarks. Within Rockefeller Center, the British Empire Building and La Maison Francaise are to the west and the International Building is to the northwest; in addition, 608 Fifth Avenue is immediately to the southwest. The building makes up a part of Fifth Avenue's "streetwalls", rows of mid-rise buildings built in the early- to mid-1900s clad in limestone or beige brick. The New York City Landmarks Preservation Commission designated the original structure as a city landmark because it contributed to this design aspect of Fifth Avenue.

The original structure was designed by Starrett & van Vleck and constructed by the Cauldwell-Wingate Company, with numerous other engineers and contractors. Starrett & van Vleck created a classical exterior matching with the character of Fifth Avenue at the time, as prompted by the Fifth Avenue Association. The association granted the store its 1924 gold medal for "best new building of the year". The architects created a modern interior for the department store and followed a new city zoning law requiring setbacks for buildings' upper floors for Saks' administrative offices.

The 36-story 623 Fifth Avenue was designed by a partnership between Lee Harris Pomeroy Associates, hired by Swiss Bank Corporation (the initial building owners), and Abramovitz Kingsland Schiff (staff architects for Saks). The New York City Planning Commission requested a height not much greater than the neighboring Newsweek Building, limiting its floor count and limiting ceiling heights to 8 feet, 8 inches. The tower is often stated to have 36 stories, as the 37th and 38th floors just house mechanical equipment, as does floor 10. The tower also has a basement loading level and sub-basement.

=== Exterior ===
==== Original building ====
The 1924 building has ten stories, as well as three facades on 49th Street, Fifth Avenue, and 50th Street. The primary Fifth Avenue elevation is connected to the 49th and 50th Street elevations by chamfered corners, each with about 200 feet (61 m) of street frontage. The exterior utilizes Indiana limestone, brick, and cast stone. The design is a modest version of neoclassical buildings popular in the 1920s, reported at the time as inspired by the architecture of the late English Renaissance and by lesser-known 18th c. London buildings. The three facades are nearly identical except for minor details at ground level.

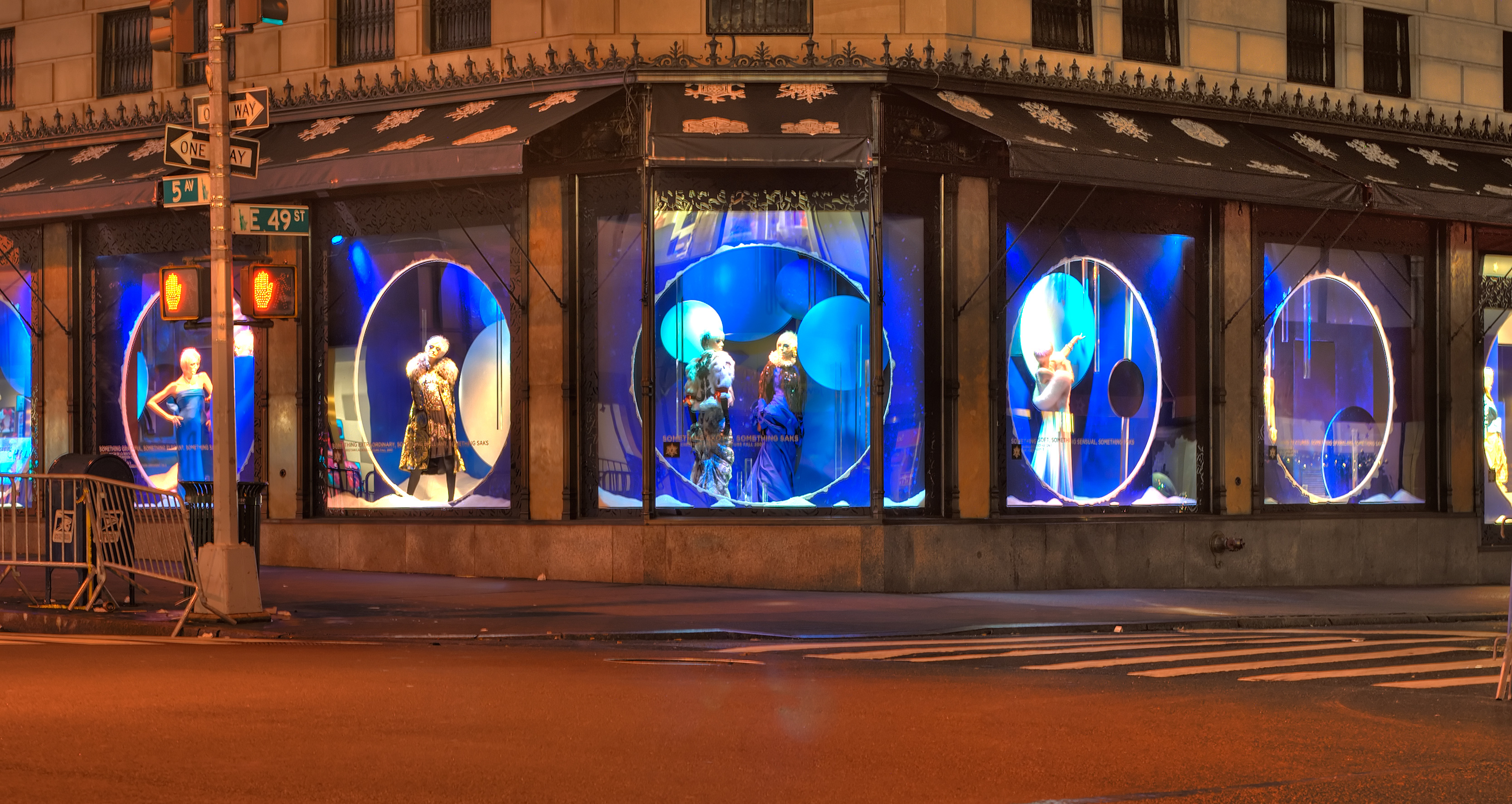
Display windows at 5th Avenue and 49th Street at night

At ground level, the facade is clad with rusticated granite blocks and contains tall display windows. This first level is high-ceilinged; its exterior reads as 1.5 stories tall. The display windows are large plate glass sheets in bronze frames, with narrow sections of marble wall between each window. Annually from October to December, these display windows contain holiday decorations. On Fifth Avenue, the display windows span the block and are only interrupted by two entrances. The presence of twin entrances, while relatively rare for department stores, emphasizes the building's size and full-block Fifth Avenue frontage. The entranceways are rectangular, with carved spiral moldings and topped with a plain cornice. Sets of doors span the lower halves of the entrances, while the upper halves have windows set behind ornate metal grilles.

The 49th and 50th Street entrances have original metal canopies hung above the doorways. The canopies read "Saks & Company" between squares with quatrefoil designs; the canopy tops are decorated with a bronze frieze of urns and floral motifs. The eastern end of the 49th Street facade has a loading bay topped with an ornamental bronze cornice. The 49th Street loading bay was for receiving merchandise. A corresponding loading bay on 50th Street was used for shipping and contained an adjacent employee entrance.

The main element of the facade is on its second and third floors – a 14-bay-wide order of fluted pilasters supporting an architrave, all constructed of Indiana limestone. The design is flat and restrained, though the pilasters' capitals and the architrave's frieze are ornate and inventive. Another architrave divides the second and third floors, featuring a decorative balustrade.

The fourth through sixth stories are less ornate, with a brick exterior and rectangular windows. The fourth-story windows have decorative cast stone surrounds topped by plain panels. Above this story is a sill molding, and the seventh story, also brick-faced but with ornamental stone roundels placed between each of the windows. The story is topped with a cornice and balustrade above. These first through seventh stories feature chamfered bays between the Fifth Avenue and side street facades.

The eighth, ninth, and tenth stories are progressively set back from the street fronts. The eighth story is relatively bare, while the ninth has narrow windows surrounded alternatively by slender colonnettes and cast stone rectangular panels. The story is topped with a heavy stone cornice and plain brick parapet. The tenth story has simple windows and a brick exterior, also topped with a cornice and final stone balustrade.

==== 623 Fifth Avenue ====
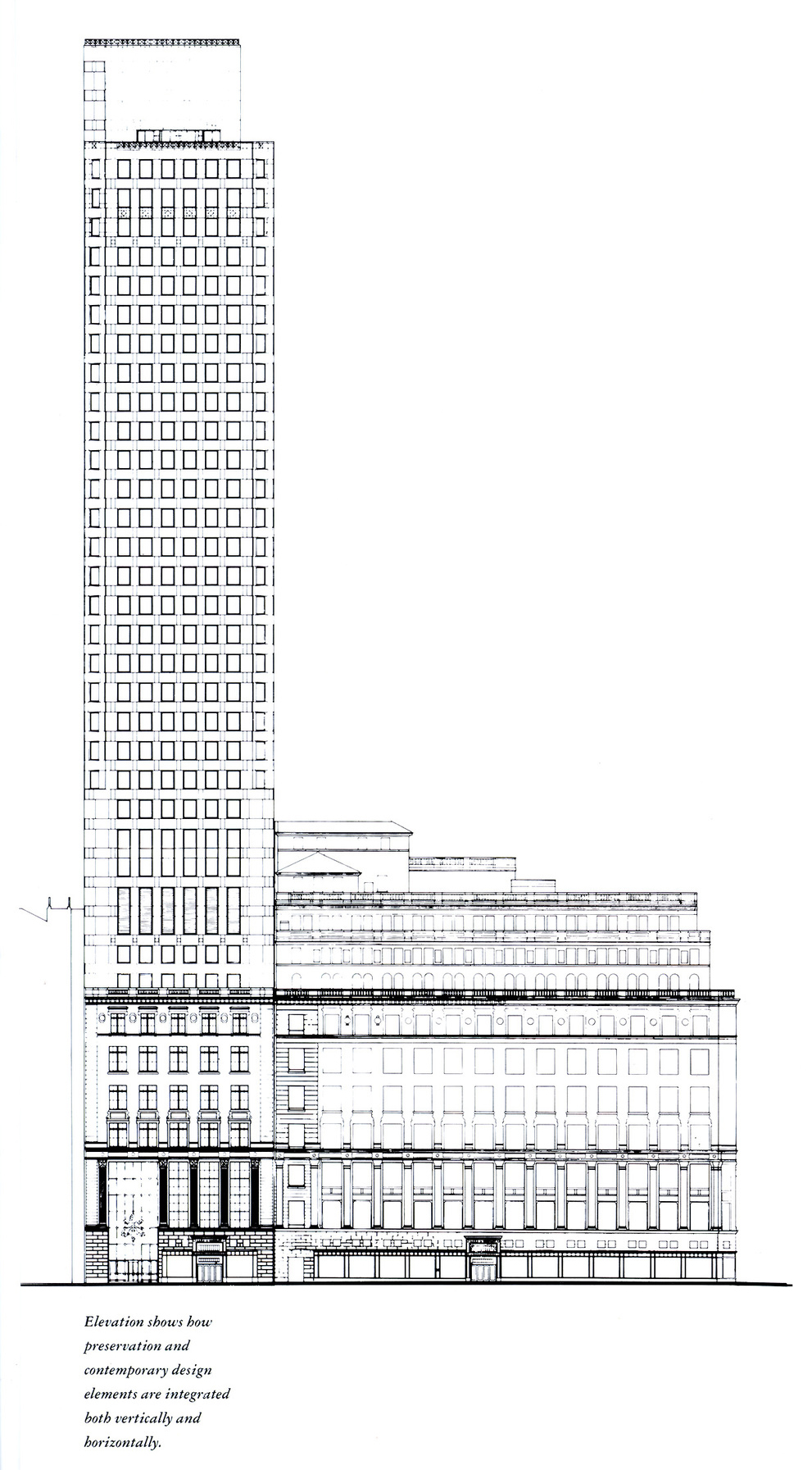
Facade details of 623 Fifth; seven floors mirror the original store

The tower adjacent to the original flagship was originally known as Swiss Bank Tower and 10 East 50th Street and, since 2002, has also been known as 623 Fifth Avenue. All 38 stories of the tower addition are clad in Indiana limestone. The tower and original Saks building are easily viewable from across the street at 30 Rockefeller Plaza and its Top of the Rock observation deck. From there, 623 Fifth Avenue rises symmetrically above Saks, and with a carved-out center, reciprocating the axis of the protruding 30 Rockefeller Plaza. The corners of the tower also contain chamfers that relate to the design of the original store. This section features ribbons of windows only separated by thin limestone spandrels; the rest of the building has standalone or punched windows.

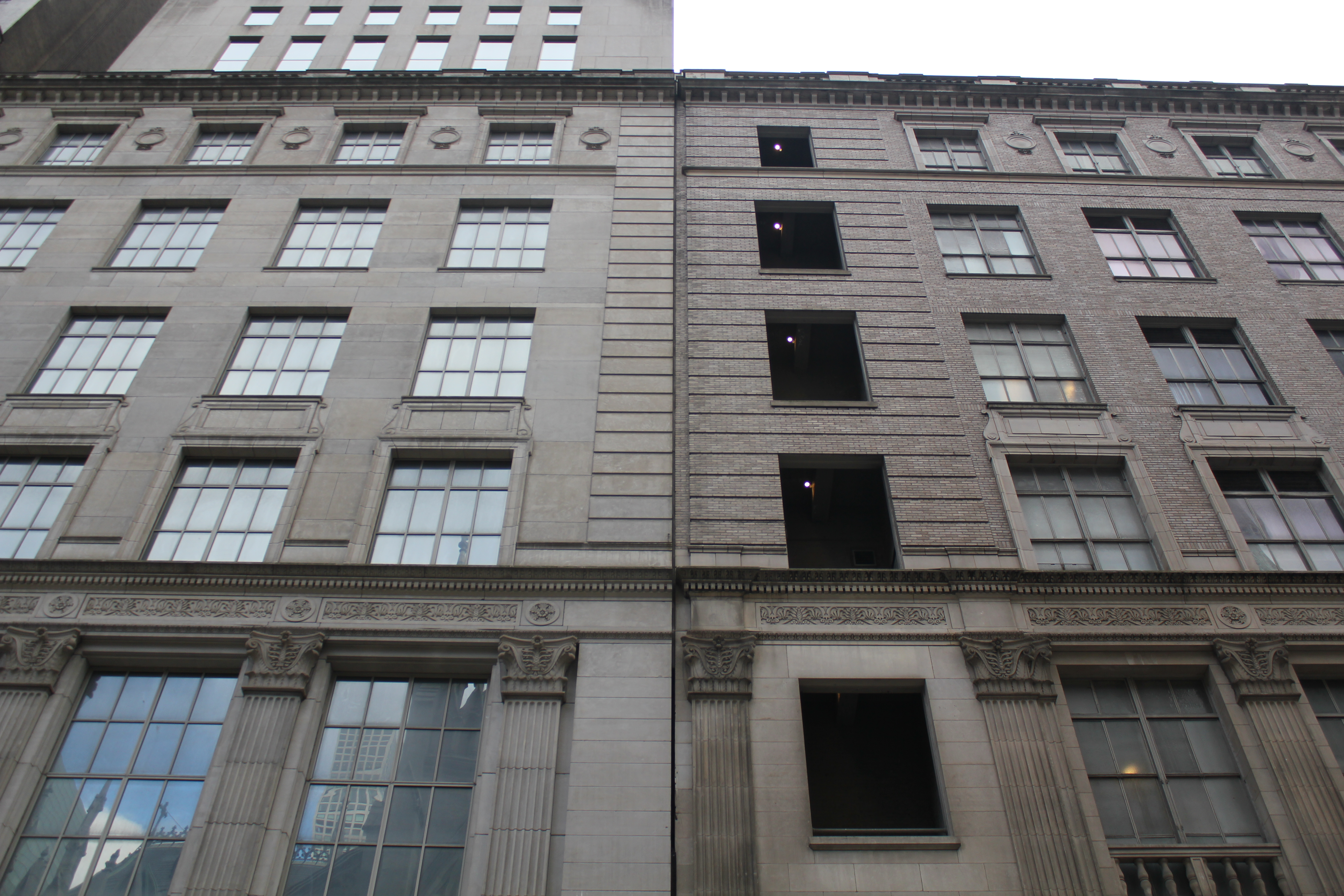
Facade details of 623 Fifth (left) and original store (right) along 50th Street

The first seven floors of the building, constructed in 1990, feature an exterior mirroring the 1924 Saks building. The bank had favored a modern facade, though the city's Landmarks Preservation Commission desired an extension of the 1924 facade. Both Saks and the offices share street frontage on its 49th and 50th Street facades. The 50th Street facade is a near-identical replication, with only subtle changes in form and detail, and with hand-carved ornamentation. Saks gained two new display windows and an entranceway replicating the original single 50th Street entrance, while Swiss Bank Corporation gained a two-bay-wide and three-story-tall grand entrance. The 49th Street facade at ground-level is more modern, though with a Saks entrance and show windows replicating originals. The facade is pulled back from the street, giving this side a small paved forecourt. On either side of the new Saks entrance are its relocated loading dock and a secondary office tower entrance.

=== Interior ===
The original structure had over 400,000 square feet (37,000 m^{2}) of floor area, while the tower has 370,000 sq ft (34,000 m^{2}). The tower's first through ninth floors are operated by Saks, with a 100,000 sq ft (9,300 m^{2}) expansion. The 10th story of the tower has mechanical equipment, while the 11th through 36th floors are office space that is operated separately.

==== Department store ====
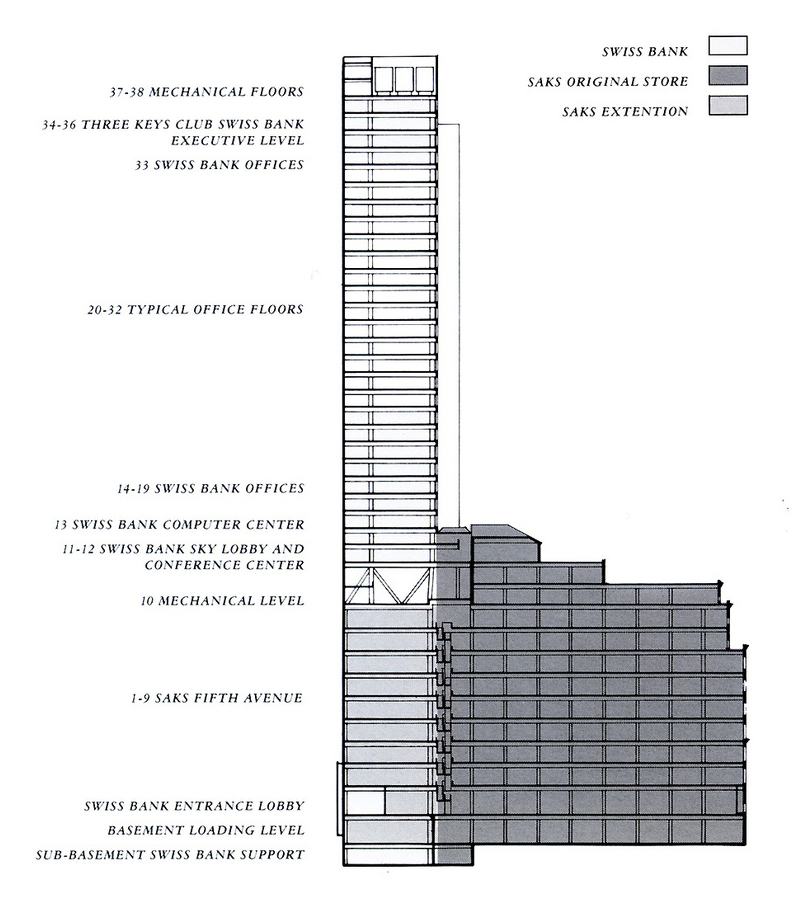
Layout of 623 Fifth Avenue beside the original Saks store

When the original department store opened, the first through seventh stories were dedicated to sales. There were also four stories of offices and storerooms. The basement was used for shipping and receiving, the eighth story was used for offices, and the ninth and tenth stories for stockrooms and workrooms. The upper floors were subsequently turned into sales space as well.

As of 2020, the store spans 600,000 or 650,000 square feet (56,000 or 60,000 m^{2}). The main floor is about 53,000 square feet (4,900 m^{2}) and includes a handbag department, as well as an escalator to the second floor that was decorated by Rem Koolhaas.

The first story has a ceiling height of 18.75 feet (5.72 m), while the other stories have ceiling heights of 14 feet (4.3 m). The building's superstructure is formed by eight sets of columns. Twelve elevators were placed at the eastern end of the building, in the rear. Two enclosed stairways were installed near the Fifth Avenue entrances, and there were service stairs at each of the rear corners. The furnishings were designed in hardwood, while the wall surfaces and columns above contained white finishing. The flat-paneled ceilings had suspended light fixtures and concealed sprinkler pipes.

==== Office space ====
Each of the office stories has a ceiling of 8 feet 8 inches (2.64 m). The office tower's two-story lobby is on the 11th and 12th floors, a sky lobby atop the Saks expansion, with four shuttle elevators taking passengers up to this lobby. The lobby originally had a waterfall and 1989 Richard Serra work, Fin, made of curved oxidized iron and weighing 18 tons. The lobby level also has a conference center and cafeteria.

As late as 2002, the building had a five-story corporate penthouse for executive offices, with a total of 65,000 square feet (6,000 m^{2}). The offices, on floors 32 to 36, had Swiss pearwood-lined walls, while its elevator lobbies and reception areas had cut limestone walls. The space also featured meeting rooms, a kitchen, and a dining room.

== History ==
=== Origin: A. Saks & Co. ===
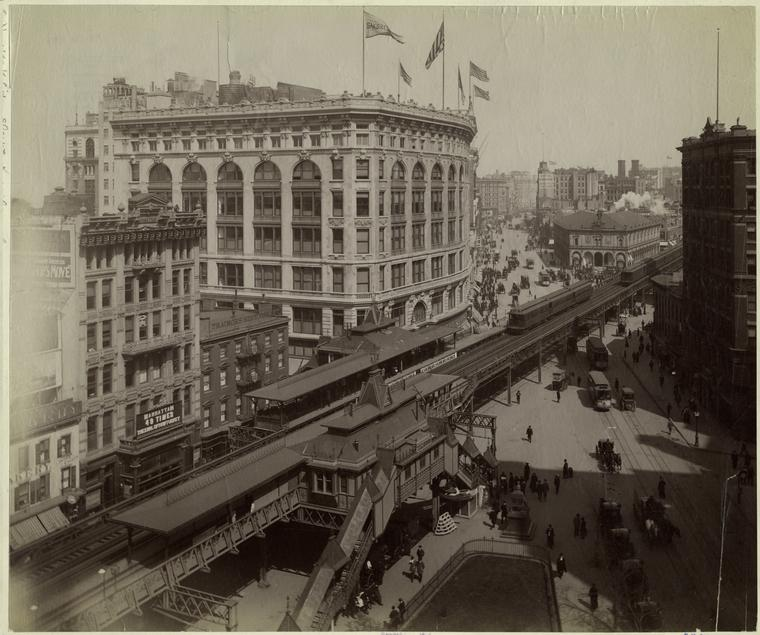
The Herald Square Saks & Co. store in 1903, behind the 33rd Street station

Andrew Saks was born to a German Jewish family in Baltimore. He worked as a peddler and paper boy before moving to Washington, D.C., where at the age of only 20, and in the still-chaotic and tough economic times of 1867, only two years after the United States prevailed in the American Civil War, he established a men's clothing store with his brother Isadore. A. Saks & Co. occupied a storefront in the Avenue House Hotel building at 517 (300–308) 7th Street, N.W., in what is still Washington's downtown shopping district. Saks annexed the store next door, and in 1887 started building a large new store on the site of the old Avenue Hotel Building at 7th and Market Space (now United States Navy Memorial Plaza). By the 1880s, Saks had expanded his business to Indianapolis and Richmond, Virginia.

Saks opened a large department store in 1902 in New York City's Herald Square on 34th Street and Broadway (at 1293–1311 Broadway). Andrew Saks ran the New York store as a family affair with his brother Isadore, and his sons Horace and William. Andrew Saks died in 1912 and his son Horace took over the company's management. Horace Saks wanted to move to the Fifth Avenue shopping district, which had been first developed in 1905 with the opening of the B. Altman and Company Building at 34th Street and which was gradually expanding northward. However, he deferred a relocation of the store during World War I.

=== Relocation ===
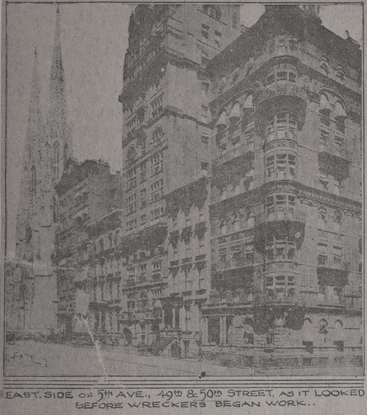
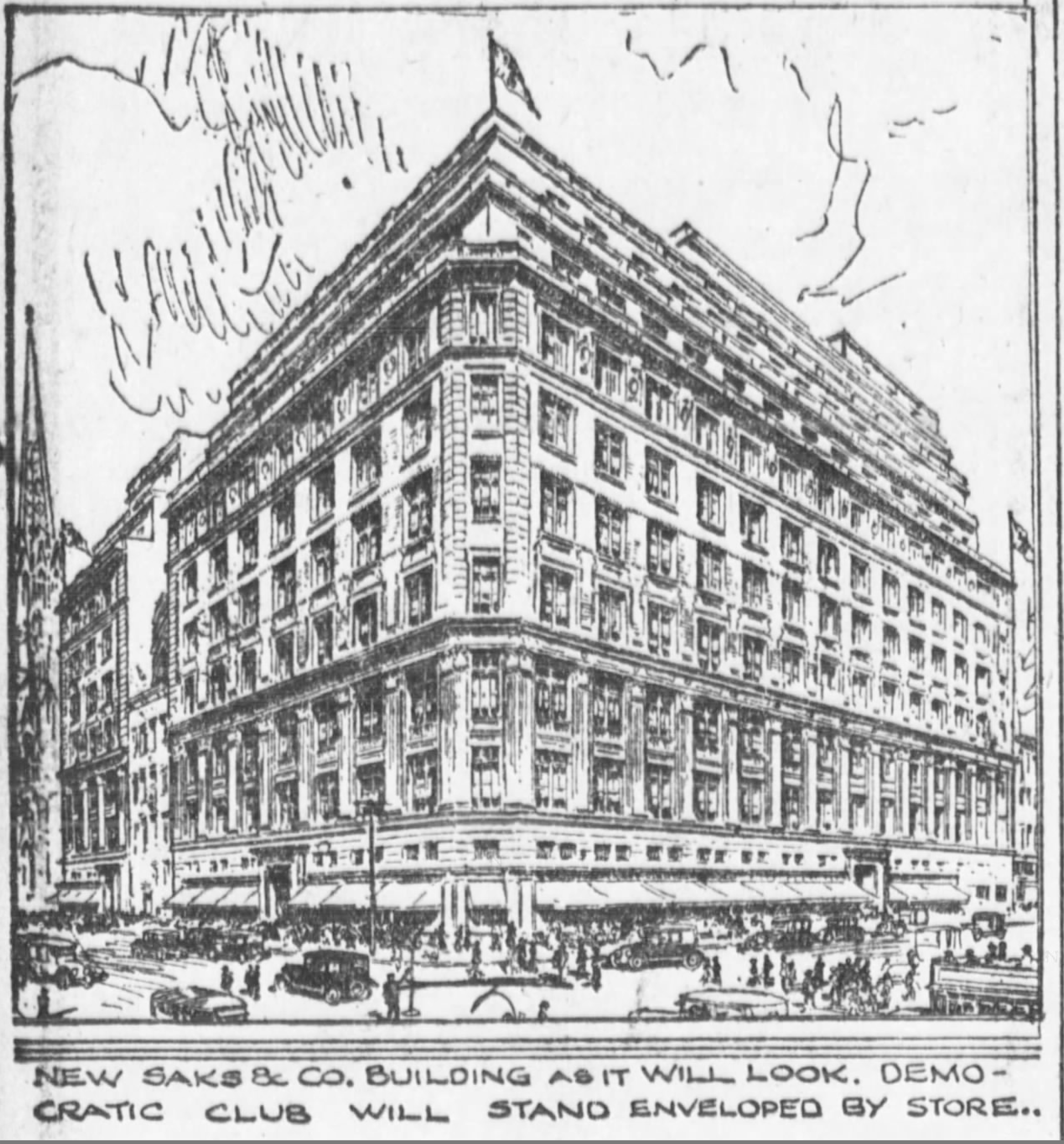
Building site and proposal for a U-shaped building for Saks, 1922

Saks & Company leased the Buckingham Hotel and Belgravia Apartments, on Fifth Avenue between 49th and 50th Streets, in April 1920 for $35 million. At the time, the site was described in the Real Estate Record as a "new northern outpost for large retail trade". In June 1921, Starrett & Van Vleck filed plans for a nine-story building on the Fifth Avenue site. Demolition of the two structures began later that year.

Further underlining the need for a new store was the fact that, in 1922, the landlord of the Herald Square building doubled the rent. The National Democratic Club occupied the middle of the Saks site, at 617 Fifth Avenue, but the club originally refused a $1 million offer for its site, which measured 100 by 42 feet (30 by 13 m). As a result, Saks & Company initially sought to construct a U-shaped building wrapping around the clubhouse. Saks merged in April 1923 with Gimbel Brothers, Inc., which was owned by Horace Saks' cousin Bernard Gimbel. Gimbel took over the Herald Square lease, paid off Saks' debt, and bought $8 million of the company's stock. The Saks Fifth Avenue store became a joint venture between Saks and Gimbel. Saks & Company bought the Democratic Club in May 1923.

On September 15, 1924, the Saks Fifth Avenue Building opened at 611 Fifth Avenue, with a full-block avenue frontage south of St. Patrick's Cathedral, facing what would become Rockefeller Center. At the time, The Evening World wrote that it did not consider Saks a department store, contrary to popular belief. The newspaper stated that Saks sold no dry goods or furniture, only dealing in clothing and accessories. The new store did not add any of these departments, only doubling the floor space of the existing departments. The Wall Street Journal projected the new store would ultimately have an annual profit of $17 million. The store would become known as "Saks-Fifth Avenue" with a hyphen, as compared with the older location, known as "Saks Herald Square" or "Saks 34th Street".

=== Mid-20th century ===
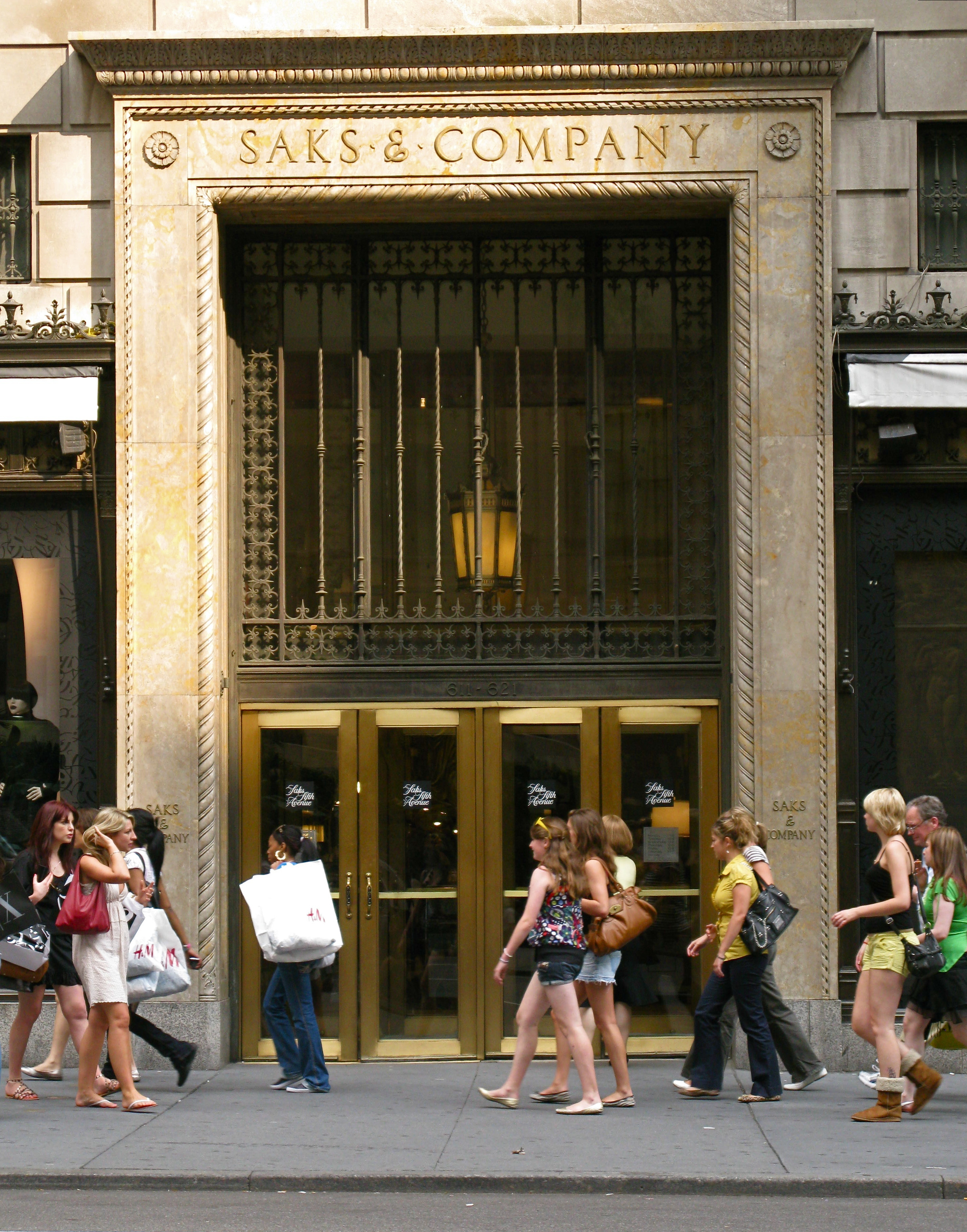
One of the store's entrances

In 1926, the Saks brothers withdrew from the operation of Saks & Company, stating that the Fifth Avenue store had become "satisfactorily" established. Over subsequent years, several branches of the Saks Fifth Avenue brand were opened, and the Fifth Avenue store became a flagship location. From 1929 to 1969, Sophie Gimbel led the store's custom department. Gimbel, wife of the company president, designed elegant clothes and introduced women's culottes to the American public.

On the land underlying the Saks flagship, the Saks Realty Company initially owned the former Democratic Club plot, but the remaining site was owned by the George Kemp Company. In 1935, the Kemp Company bought the Democratic Club plot, thereby obtaining ownership of the entire site. Also in 1935, Saks introduced a ski department with a ski slope and skiing classes. By 1938, Fortune magazine characterized the Fifth Avenue store as upscale, as opposed to "the anthill bargain basement tables on Herald Square", the latter of which ended up closing in the 1960s. An imported-object gift shop, with a separate entrance on 50th Street, opened in 1950. The Fifth Avenue site was sold in 1952 to William Zeckendorf, who the following year sold it to the Rockefeller family.

=== Late 20th century ===
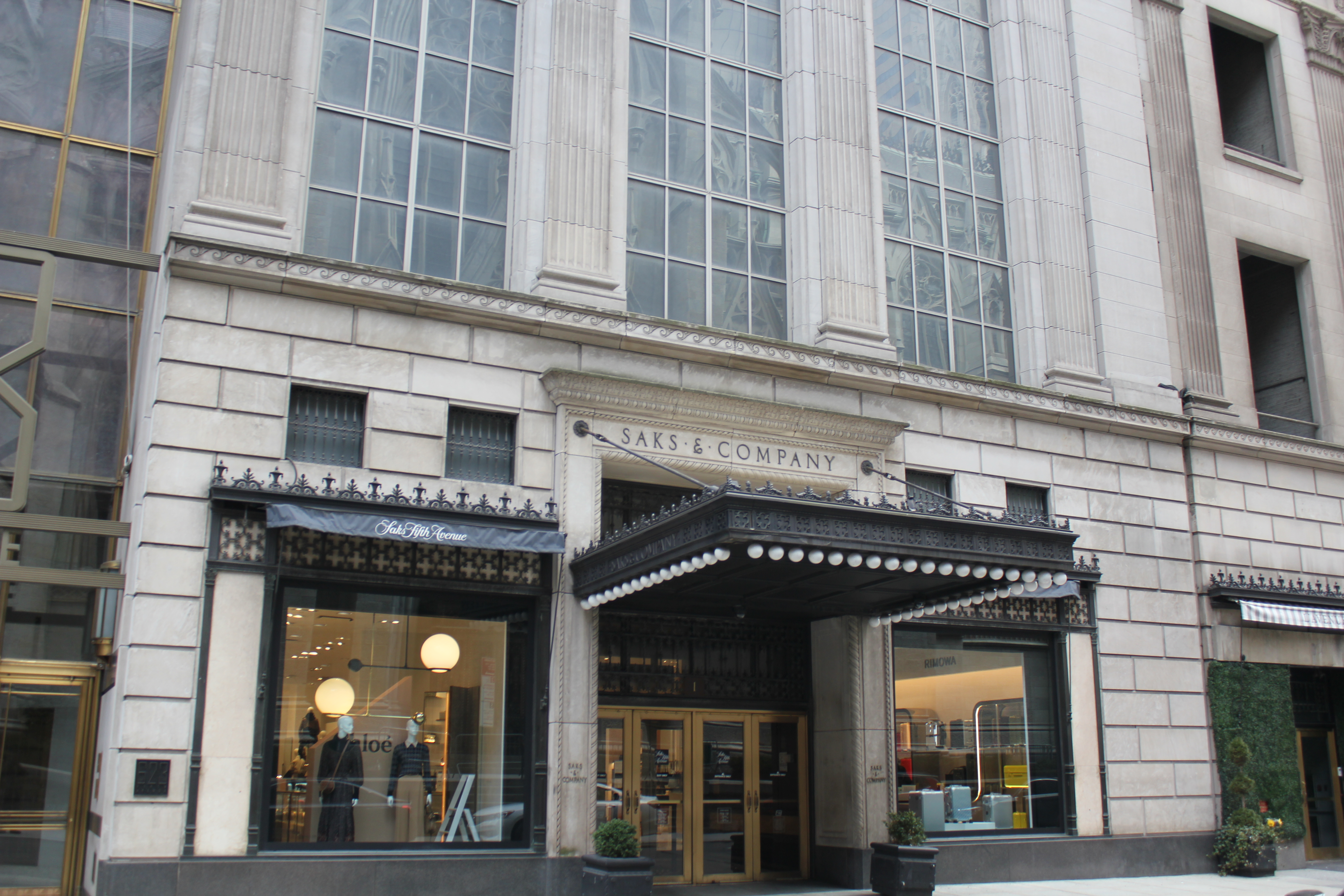
Saks entrance at the base of 623 Fifth Avenue on 50th Street

In February 1979, Saks announced the flagship store would be extensively remodeled for $200 million as part of the first major renovation in the flagship's history. Initially, Saks officials planned a nine-story expansion "in the backyard of a former brownstone" behind the existing flagship. The flagship's first escalators would be installed within the expansion, as Saks officials sought to minimize disruption to the main store. These plans brought criticism from observers who worried the expansion would lower the quality of Saks' flagship to that of Bloomingdale's or Macy's. That July, Saks submitted provisional plans to the New York City Planning Commission (CPC) for a 50-story office and residential tower east of its flagship. The lots to the east had been proposed as the site of a tower since the 1950s but had not been developed because of a lack of participation by Saks real estate interests. Work on the expansion proceeded before the tower was approved and, in November 1979, a set of new escalators opened in the rear of the Saks flagship. Project architect Hambrecht Terrell then renovated the second floor with a brick corridor containing shops for notable fashion designers. The third floor was also redesigned with a corridor lined with women's boutiques, and the sixth floor was renovated as a moderately-priced clothing section for the "working woman".

Saks entered a joint venture with Rockefeller Center Properties in 1981 to develop the site with a 690,000-square-foot (64,000 m^{2}) tower. Under the plan, about a quarter of the space would have been occupied by Saks while the rest would be office space. The store's land lot and the adjoining midblock parcel were in separate zoning districts with different floor area ratios, and so air rights could not be transferred unless the New York City Landmarks Preservation Commission (LPC) designated it as a landmark. According to the CPC chairman's counsel, if the flagship were a city landmark, the tower would be allowed because its development would assist the preservation of the landmark. Saks also supported a landmark designation for its store. Accordingly, the LPC designated Saks Fifth Avenue as a landmark on December 20, 1984. The LPC unanimously approved the tower proposal the following June.

After Saks' agreement with Rockefeller Center Properties failed, Galbreath-Ruffin became a partner in the tower project, though Swiss Bank Corporation subsequently bought out Galbreath-Ruffin's stake. A proposal for a 36-story tower was presented by a joint venture of Saks and Swiss Bank in 1986. The former would expand its flagship space into the base of the tower while the latter would use the upper floors as its headquarters. Swiss Bank and Saks spent fourteen months negotiating over the plans. The largest point of contention was the tower addition's 50th Street frontage, which Saks wanted for display windows, but this was ultimately allocated to Swiss Bank for its entrance. The initial plan for the tower's facade was designed by Abramowitz Kingsland Schiff, which had preferred a design with brown and white horizontal bands. Pomeroy took over as main architect after Abramowitz Kingsland Schiff's plan was criticized as Brutalist and out-of-context with surrounding buildings.

Work on the midblock site started in 1987, and the tower was completed in 1990. The store's selling floors were expanded into the first through ninth stories of the tower. The additions included a restaurant called Cafe SFA on the eighth floor and a beauty salon and spa at the ninth floor. The tower was able to obtain a prestigious Fifth Avenue address because the skyscraper is on the same land lot as the 1924 store and was built using its air rights. Architectural writer Paul Goldberger criticized the design as bland, saying the Swiss Bank Tower was "so successful at not offending that it ends up having nothing to say". The tower was fully occupied by 1992. The original flagship and the tower addition have a single owner, initially Swiss Bank Corporation, which had leased the ground from Saks for 100 years. Cohen Brothers Realty Corporation acquired the Swiss Bank Tower in 1997. Following Swiss Bank's subsequent merger with UBS, the company moved its offices out of the tower.

=== 21st century ===
==== 2000s and 2010s ====
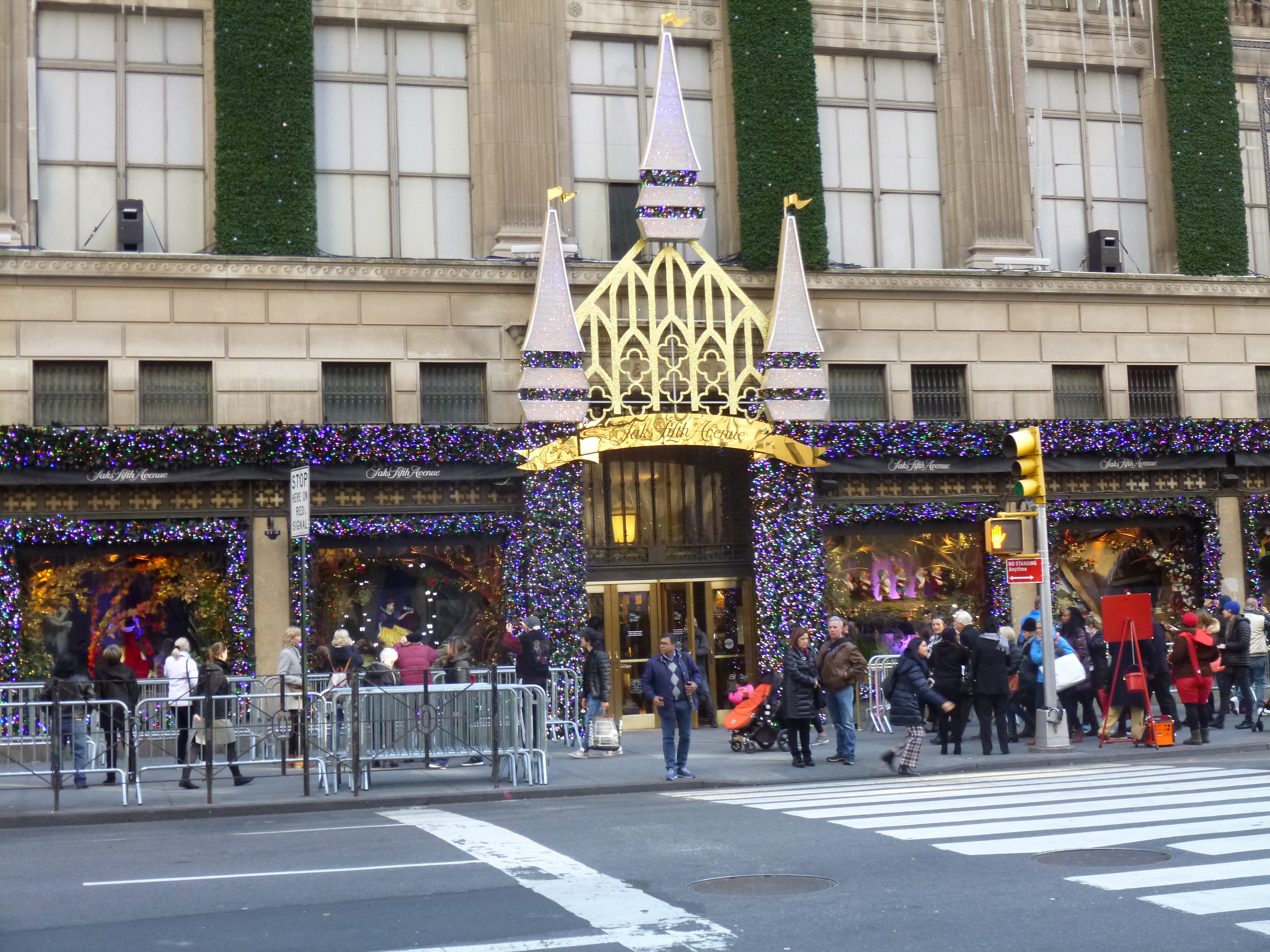
Decorated during Christmas

Starting in the late 1990s, Saks Fifth Avenue extensively renovated its flagship. Saks Fifth Avenue completed the $125 million renovation of the flagship store in 2003. A year later, Saks' new CEO Fred Wilson announced plans to undo much of the renovation and spend $150 million to further remodel the flagship. In August 2007, the United States Postal Service began an experimental program selling the "plus" ZIP Code extension to businesses. The first company to do so was Saks Fifth Avenue, which received the ZIP Code of 10022-7463 ("SHOE") for the flagship's eighth-floor shoe department. The building's eighth floor thus became the first instance in the United States in which an individual story of a building had its own ZIP Code. This coincided with the expansion of the shoe department, which had moved from the fourth floor and doubled in size to 8,500 square feet (790 m^{2}).

As of 2013, the New York flagship store's real estate value was estimated between $800 million and over $1 billion. At the time, the flagship generated around 20% of Saks' annual sales, valued at $620 million. Hudson's Bay Company, which took over the Saks Fifth Avenue chain in 2013, took out a loan the following year. The loan gave the Fifth Avenue store a book value of $3.7 billion, more than the $2.9 billion the company had paid for the entire chain. In 2015, Saks began a $250 million, three-year restoration of the flagship store. The company president desired reinventing the flagship, opening up its floors and closing its Cafe SFA to create a new eatery, the Parisian-style L'Avenue. Saks planned a spiral staircase around a glass elevator, linking its first and second floors. It would move around departments and convert some back-room space to retail space. The main floor, which was renovated to contain a handbag department, was completed in August 2019. The value of the building was recorded at $1.6 billion in 2019, amid a general decline in the retail sector.

==== 2020s to present ====
A department for children opened in March 2020, the first in the flagship store's history. Additional work was to be completed in 2021, including a men's shoes department and a basement jewelry section. In August 2021, workspace company WeWork announced it would open a location on the Saks flagship's 10th floor. The coworking firm Convene operated space there for nearly two years beginning in September 2021. After New York state officials announced in April 2022 that they would issue three casino licenses in Downstate New York, Hudson's Bay Company proposed constructing a casino on the top three stories of the Saks Fifth Avenue flagship store; however, this proposal was withdrawn in April 2025. The womenswear company Skims opened a shop on the flagship's fifth floor in May 2023, and a video studio opened on the tenth floor that October.

In 2024, Cohen Brothers Realty submitted documents to the New York City Department of City Planning, indicating that they wanted to convert 623 Fifth Avenue's office space to apartments, since the floor area of the tower was too small for many modern tenants. The lowest ten stories of the tower would continue to be part of the Saks Fifth Avenue flagship, while the 11th and higher floors were to become 172 apartments, each with an average area of about 2,000 square feet (190 m^{2}). In August 2025, Vornado Realty Trust bought 623 Fifth Avenue for $217 million, with plans to instead convert the space back to offices.

== See also ==
- List of New York City Designated Landmarks in Manhattan from 14th to 59th Streets
