= 18 East 50th Street =

Building in Manhattan, New York

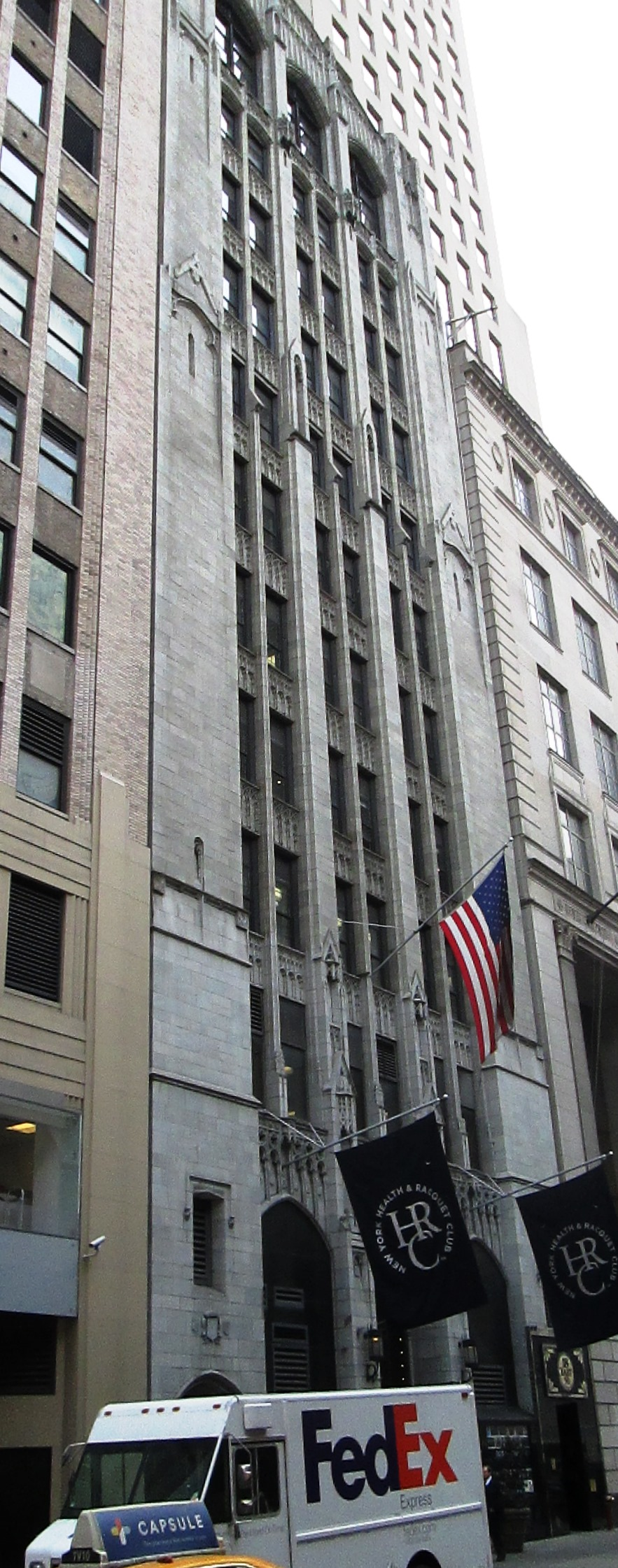
- Seen from the north
- Interactive map of the 18 East 50th Street area
- Alternative names: Hampton Shops Building, New York Health & Racquet Club Building

General information
- Architectural style: Neo-Gothic or Perpendicular Gothic
- Location: Manhattan, New York
- Coordinates: 40°45′28.3″N 73°58′34.2″W
- Construction started: 1915
- Completed: 1916

Technical details
- Floor count: 11

Design and construction
- Architects: Rouse & Goldstone and Joseph L. Steinam
- Main contractor: Bing & Bing

New York City Landmark
- Designated: November 22, 2016
- Reference no.: 2576

18 East 50th Street, also known as the Hampton Shops Building and the New York Health & Racquet Club Building, is an office building in the Midtown Manhattan neighborhood of New York City. Located on the south side of 50th Street, on the middle of the block between Fifth Avenue and Madison Avenue, it was designed by William Lawrence Rouse, Lafayette Anthony Goldstone, and Joseph L. Steinam.

18 East 50th Street is designed in the Neo-Gothic style, sometimes referred to as the Perpendicular Gothic style. The style was chosen because it complemented the St. Patrick's Cathedral complex across the street. The 11-story building has a facade of grey terracotta that resembles granite. The building has no setbacks, as it was built before zoning ordinances required them.

The Hampton Shops, founded in the early 1860s as the Grand Rapids Furniture Company, sold traditionally-styled furniture. The building site was leased in 1914 and the store at 18 East 50th Street was constructed from June 1915 to March 1916. Hampton Shops subsequently acquired the lease before going bankrupt in 1938. The building was then divided up and leased to art and design businesses. The New York City Landmarks Preservation Commission designated 18 East 50th Street as an official landmark in 2016.

== Site ==
18 East 50th Street is in the Midtown Manhattan neighborhood of New York City, on the south side of 50th Street between Fifth Avenue to the west and Madison Avenue to the east. The land lot covers 5,640 square feet (524 m^{2}) with a frontage of 56.4 feet (17.2 m) along 50th Street and a depth of 100 feet (30 m). Nearby buildings include 623 Fifth Avenue (containing Saks Fifth Avenue's flagship store) to the west; St. Patrick's Cathedral to the north; 444 Madison Avenue to the east; and Tower 49 to the south. In addition, the Lotte New York Palace Hotel and Villard Houses are less than a block east, while Rockefeller Center is less than a block west.

Before the building was developed, the site contained a pair of houses rising three and five stories. These buildings were purchased in the 1880s by Andrew Jeffries Garvey, who was affiliated with William M. Tweed, the one-time leader of the Tammany Hall political ring. In 1893, Garvey leased the site for twenty years to Arthur H. Cutler of the Cutler School, at a rate of $8,500 per year, with options to renew the property indefinitely. The Cutlers conveyed the lease to residential developer W. W. and T. M. Hall in 1906. When Garvey died, his daughter Helena assumed ownership of the ground.

== Architecture ==
18 East 50th Street was designed by William Lawrence Rouse and Lafayette Anthony Goldstone of the firm Rouse & Goldstone, along with Joseph L. Steinam. Completed in 1916, the building was designed in what was characterized by the Real Estate Record as the "Perpendicular Gothic" style. The building is 11 stories tall, or 12 including a mezzanine at the base, and contains a roof 133.94 feet (40.82 m) tall. The design was intended to "harmonize well with the surroundings", particularly with St. Patrick's Cathedral. The building has no setbacks because it was designed just before the 1916 Zoning Resolution, which would have required such setbacks, was passed.

At the time of its completion, the Hampton Shops Building was described as "interesting" in the Real Estate Record, as well as a "perfect example of pure Renaissance design" in the New-York Tribune. The building was also praised by the architect Aymar Embury III as a "very lovely piece" of Gothic design. Writing for The New York Times in 1920, Helen Bullitt Lowry said the building "out-Goths the very Goths in its efforts to exploit 'the period' quality in its business". (Note: Lowry mistakenly identified the building as being on West 50th Street.)

=== Facade ===
The facade is made of terracotta interspersed with random ashlar in varying colors. The only facade visible to the public, on 50th Street, is divided horizontally into three sections, with double-height arcades (sometimes characterized as loggias) at the base and top. The loggia at the base consists of three pointed arches, flanked by a service entrance on the far left and an office entrance on the far right. The arches have been modified with storefront windows but retain Hampton Shops company insignia. The 50th Street facade had wrought iron work and stained glass windows, which resembled an entrance into a medieval castle. At the ground story, the facade was also designed with a cathedral window on the southern side.

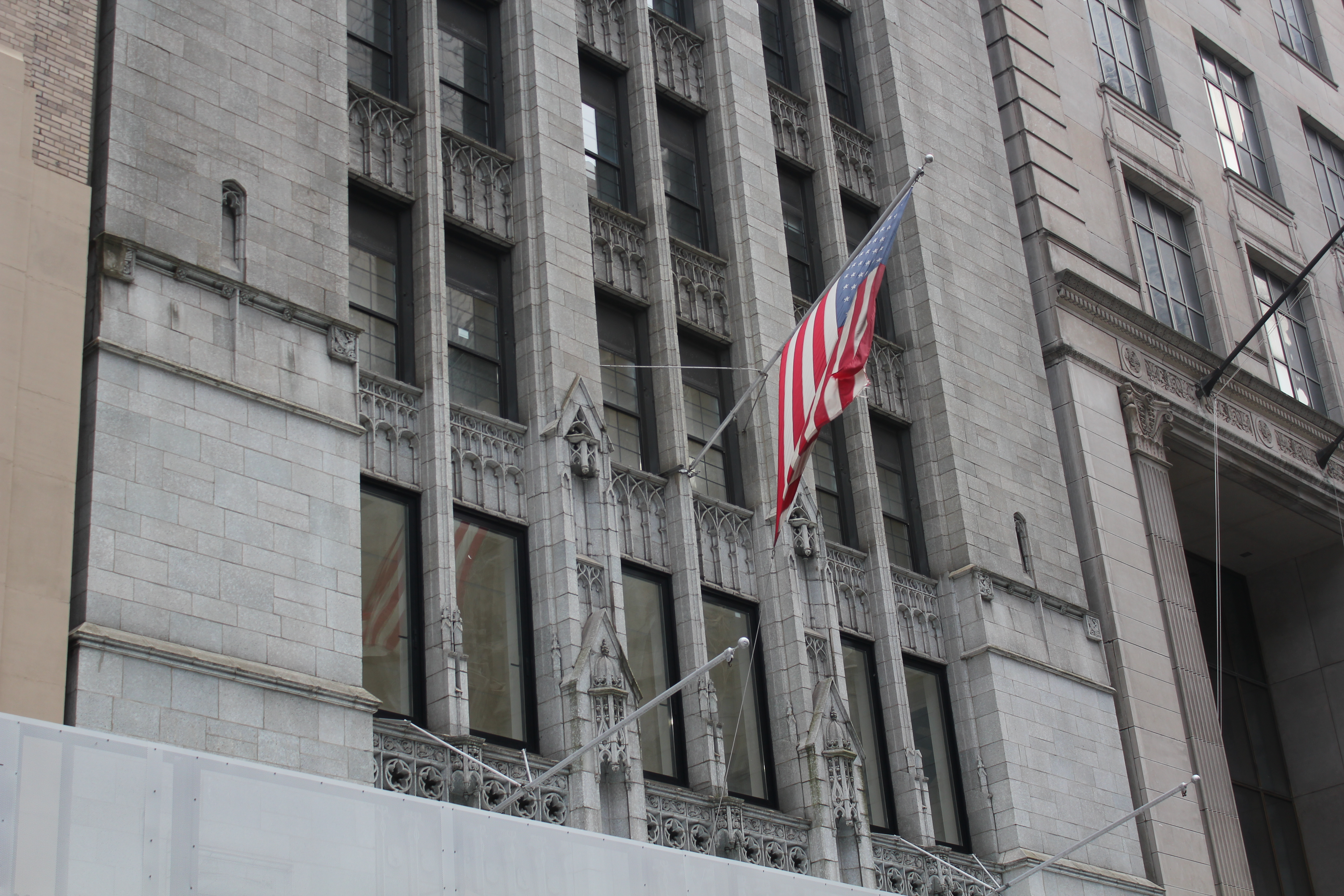
Detail of the second story

A flagpole hangs from the top of the arcade and two more from the top of the second story (the floor directly above the arcade). The intermediate stories on 50th Street are treated as subdivided vertically into three bays, each with a pair of windows. The windows on each different story are separated by spandrels with Gothic tracery. The top story has round pointed arches as well as finials.

At the time of the building's completion, the side facades were visible from the nearby avenues and contained store advertisements. According to Embury, the side facade was "agreeable in itself, of balanced character", with a design complementing the main facade. The east facade was obscured with the construction of 444 Madison Avenue in 1931, while the west facade was blocked by 623 Fifth Avenue, completed in 1990. Small portions of the western and eastern facades remain visible at the top.

=== Features ===
Inside the first story was a foyer with administrative office and elevators. The hall was 25 feet (7.6 m) tall and lit by suspended chandeliers, surrounded by a mezzanine gallery on three sides. The other stories contained eleven galleries. The seventh story was particularly ornate with decorated dining and living rooms for what the New-York Tribune described as "the suggestive exhibition of period furniture". As of 2016, the lowest four stories are used by the New York Health & Racquet Club while the other stories are used as office space.

== History ==
The Grand Rapids Furniture Company was established in 1861. Its founder Henry Mannes named the company for Grand Rapids, Michigan, a furniture manufacturing hub at the time. By 1914, the company was publicly known as the Hampton Shops Company in order to distinguish it from other firms associated with Grand Rapids. The firm retained "Grand Rapids Furniture Company" as its corporate name. Grand Rapids Furniture had a store at 34–36 West 32nd Street in Manhattan, where it used both the Hampton Shops and Grand Rapids names during the early 20th century.

=== Showrooms ===
In October 1914, the Grand Rapids Furniture Company acquired the leasehold on 18 and 20 East 50th Street from the Halls. Initially, the Real Estate Record and Guide reported the existing houses would be converted into showrooms. The following week, the Real Estate Record reported that the company would construct a new structure for its own use. Rouse, Goldstone, and Steinam filed plans with the New York City Department of Buildings in February 1915, and Bing and Bing Construction was hired as the general contractor. Work began that June and was substantially completed by January 1916. According to the media, the building was occupied by the middle of March 1916. With the completion of the Hampton Shops Building on 50th Street, the old 32nd Street building continued to be associated with the Grand Rapids Furniture Company.

A 1918 advertisement for the Hampton Shops in the New-York Tribune described the building as a "Gothic temple of art" which displayed European antique furniture. During the Hampton Shops Building's usage as a showroom, it was used for events such as a 16th-century Spanish art exhibition, as well as home-furnishing seminars. The Hampton Shops Company acquired the ground lease from Helena B. Garvey Hayden in 1922. Mutual Life Insurance placed a loan of $300,000 on the building. The building was resold to Eben C. Gould in 1927.

After the building was remodeled in 1937, the Brooklyn Daily Eagle characterized the building as selling "furniture at all prices", with entire floors dedicated to selling furniture from France, England, and the U.S. Hampton Shops reorganized in mid-1938 after filing for bankruptcy. The stock of the company was liquidated starting in December 1938 and continuing for twelve weeks.

=== Later tenancy ===
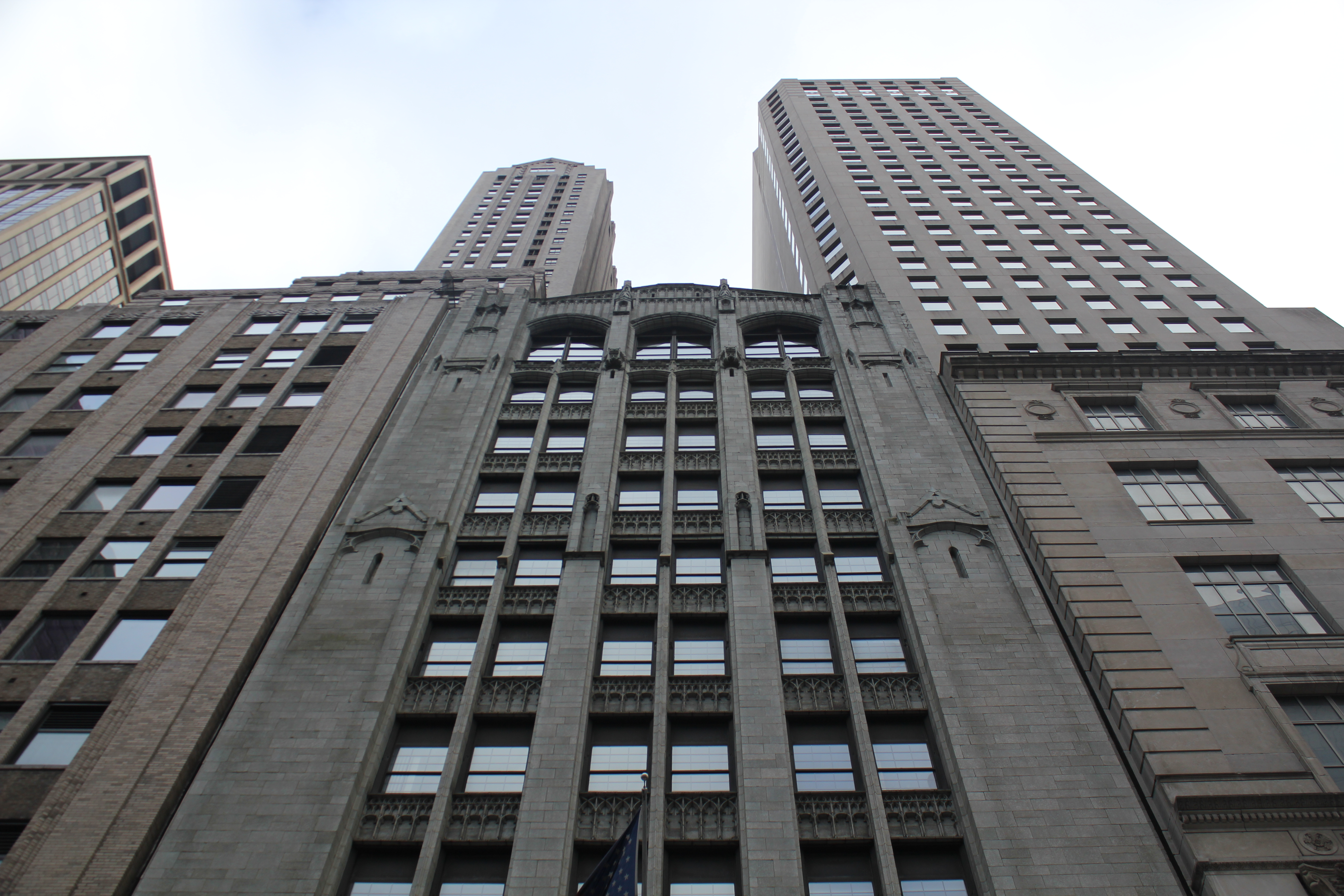
Looking up at the building's 50th Street facade, with the Swiss Bank Tower at right

After Hampton Shops' bankruptcy, 18 East 50th Street was remodeled in 1940 and leased to art and design businesses. The storefront was leased to a fur clothing store, while the upper floors contained tenants such as a dress company and a photography studio. The building was owned by 18 East 50th Street Inc. until 1945, when it was sold to air conditioning manufacturer Carrier Corporation, which opened a New York City branch office there. The Costume Museum rented space at 18 East 50th Street in 1943, though it was subsequently combined with the Metropolitan Museum of Art and moved to the Met's building in early 1946. The Carrier Company sold the building in November 1947 to Webb & Knapp, and the building was resold a month later to the Drake America Corporation, which initially intended to use the space as offices. Drake America ultimately resold the building to British firm A. M. Corporation for investment the following year.

The building continued to be used as showrooms and galleries. John Gerald opened a home-furniture showroom in 1949, and an Italian decor showroom opened in 1954. Some restrictions were placed on the operation of 18 East 50th Street, likely because the building was close to St. Patrick's Cathedral. A certificate of occupancy, issued by the Department of Buildings in September 1951, said that the windows could only display "paintings, statuary, and tapestries"; signs could not be projected from the facade; loading was forbidden from 8 a.m. to 6 p.m.; and the building could not open on Sundays. During the 1960s, the building contained the Savoy Art and Auctions Galleries.

18 East 50th Street also contained industrial and office tenants, including the National Advertising Service, the executive offices of television studio Filmways, and George Nelson & Company Industrial Design. Another tenant during this time was Bill Castleberry, president of Zebra Associates, the largest advertising agency owned by Black Americans until its bankruptcy in 1976. At one point, the building also served as headquarters of the Roman Catholic Archdiocese of New York's school system, as well as a sales office for a property on Roosevelt Island.

18 East 50th Street was sold in 1977 to Pamela Equities, subsequently known as Pan-Am Equities, which operated the New York Health & Racquet Club. Part of the interior was then converted into space for the club, while the facade was renovated with new glass storefronts and an awning. The building became known alternately as the New York Health & Racquet Club Building. Its subsequent occupants included office tenants such as the Foreign Press Center and Sports Orthopedic and Athletic Rehabilitation. In mid-2016, the New York City Landmarks Preservation Commission (LPC) proposed protecting twelve buildings in East Midtown, including 18 East 50th Street, in advance of proposed changes to the area's zoning. On November 22, 2016, the LPC designated 18 East 50th Street and ten other nearby buildings as city landmarks.

== See also ==
- Gothic Revival architecture in New York
- List of New York City Designated Landmarks in Manhattan from 14th to 59th Streets
