= Rockefeller Center =

Skyscraper complex in Manhattan, New York

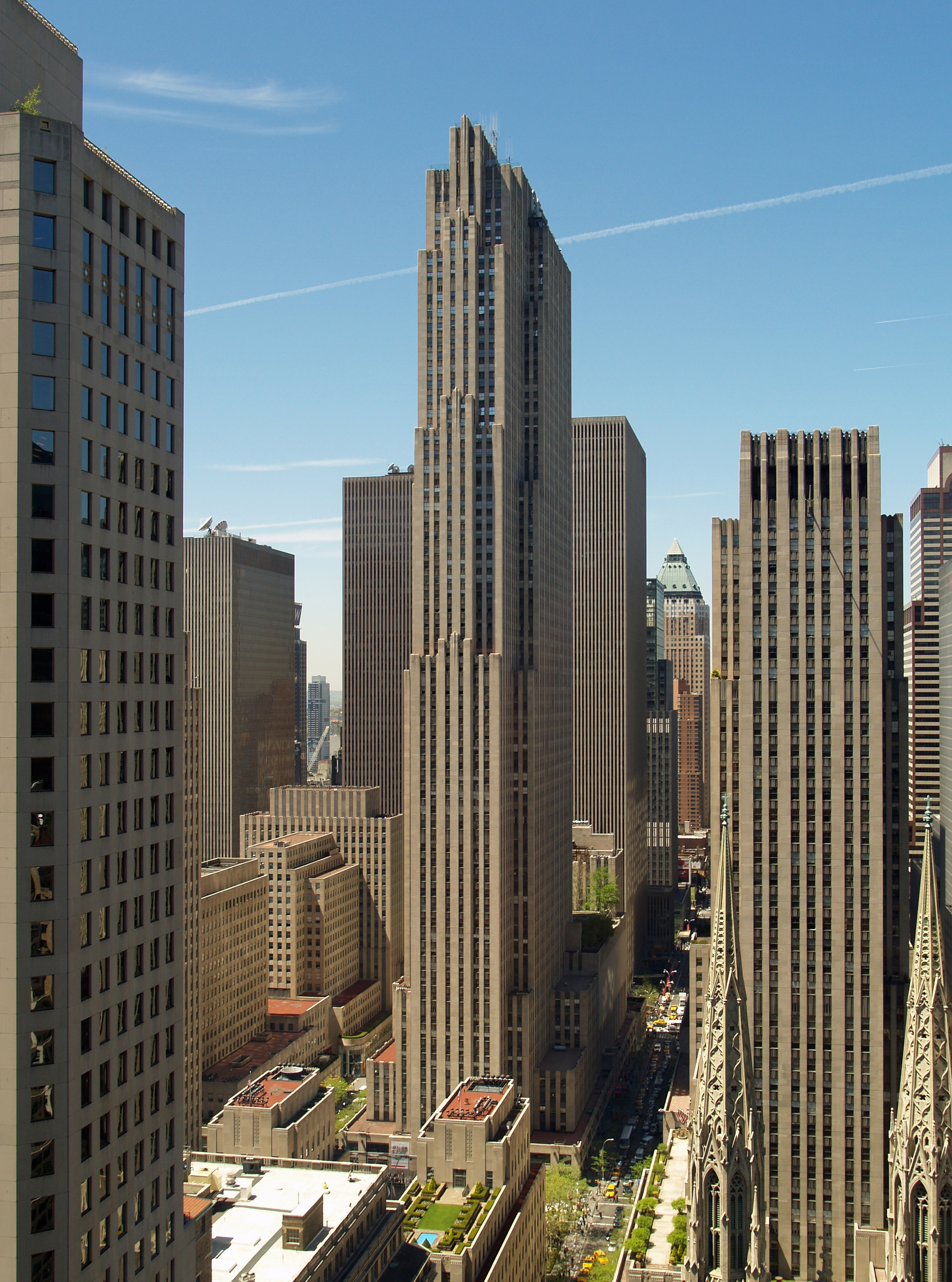
- View from the northeast of 30 Rockefeller Plaza at the heart of the complex in 2007

General information
- Status: Completed
- Type: Commercial complex
- Architectural style: Modern, Art Deco
- Location: Manhattan, New York City, U.S.
- Coordinates: 40°45′31″N 73°58′45″W
- Construction started: 1931
- Completed: 1939 (original complex); 1974 (other buildings)

Technical details
- Floor area: 22 acres (8.9 ha)

Design and construction
- Architect: Raymond Hood (Note: The actual architects were the "Associated Architects", a consortium composed of Corbett, Harrison & MacMurray; Hood, Godley & Fouilhoux; and Reinhard & Hofmeister. Hood was considered the main architect and is listed as such on the NRHP nomination.)
- Developer: Rockefeller family

Website
- www.rockefellercenter.com
- Rockefeller Center
- U.S. National Register of Historic Places
- U.S. National Historic Landmark
- New York State Register of Historic Places
- New York City Landmark
- NRHP reference No.: 87002591
- NYCL No.: 1446

Significant dates
- Added to NRHP: December 23, 1987
- Designated NHL: December 23, 1987
- Designated NYSRHP: December 23, 1987
- Designated NYCL: April 23, 1985

Rockefeller Center is a complex of 19 commercial buildings covering 22 acres (8.9 ha) between 48th Street and 51st Street in the Midtown Manhattan neighborhood of New York City. The 14 original Art Deco buildings, commissioned by the Rockefeller family, span the area between Fifth Avenue and Sixth Avenue, split by a large sunken square and a private street called Rockefeller Plaza. Later additions include 75 Rockefeller Plaza across 51st Street at the north end of Rockefeller Plaza, and four International Style buildings on the west side of Sixth Avenue.

In 1928, Columbia University, the owner of the site until 1985, leased the land to John D. Rockefeller Jr., the complex's developer. Originally envisioned as the site for a new Metropolitan Opera building, the current Rockefeller Center came about after the Met could not afford to move to the proposed new building. Various plans were discussed before the current one was approved in 1932. Construction of Rockefeller Center started in 1931, and the first buildings opened in 1933. The core of the complex was completed by 1939. Described as one of the greatest projects of the Great Depression era, Rockefeller Center became a New York City designated landmark in 1985 and a National Historic Landmark in 1987. The complex and associated land has been controlled since 2000 by Tishman Speyer, which bought the property for $1.85 billion.

The original center has several sections. Radio City, along Sixth Avenue and centered on 30 Rockefeller Plaza, includes Radio City Music Hall and was built for RCA's radio-related enterprises such as NBC. The International Complex along Fifth Avenue was built to house foreign-based tenants. The remainder of the original complex originally hosted printed media as well as Eastern Air Lines. While 600 Fifth Avenue is at the southeast corner of the complex, it was built by private interests in the 1950s and was only acquired by the center in 1963. The complex is noted for the large quantities of art present in almost all of its buildings, its expansive underground concourse, its ice-skating rink, and its annual lighting of the Rockefeller Center Christmas Tree.

== History ==
=== Context ===
The first private owner of the site was physician David Hosack, who purchased twenty acres of rural land from New York City in 1801 and opened the country's first public botanical garden, the Elgin Botanic Garden, on the site. The gardens operated until 1811, and by 1823 the property was under the ownership of Columbia University. Columbia held the property as an investment, and by 1896 consolidated its main campus 60 blocks north in Morningside Heights, in Upper Manhattan.

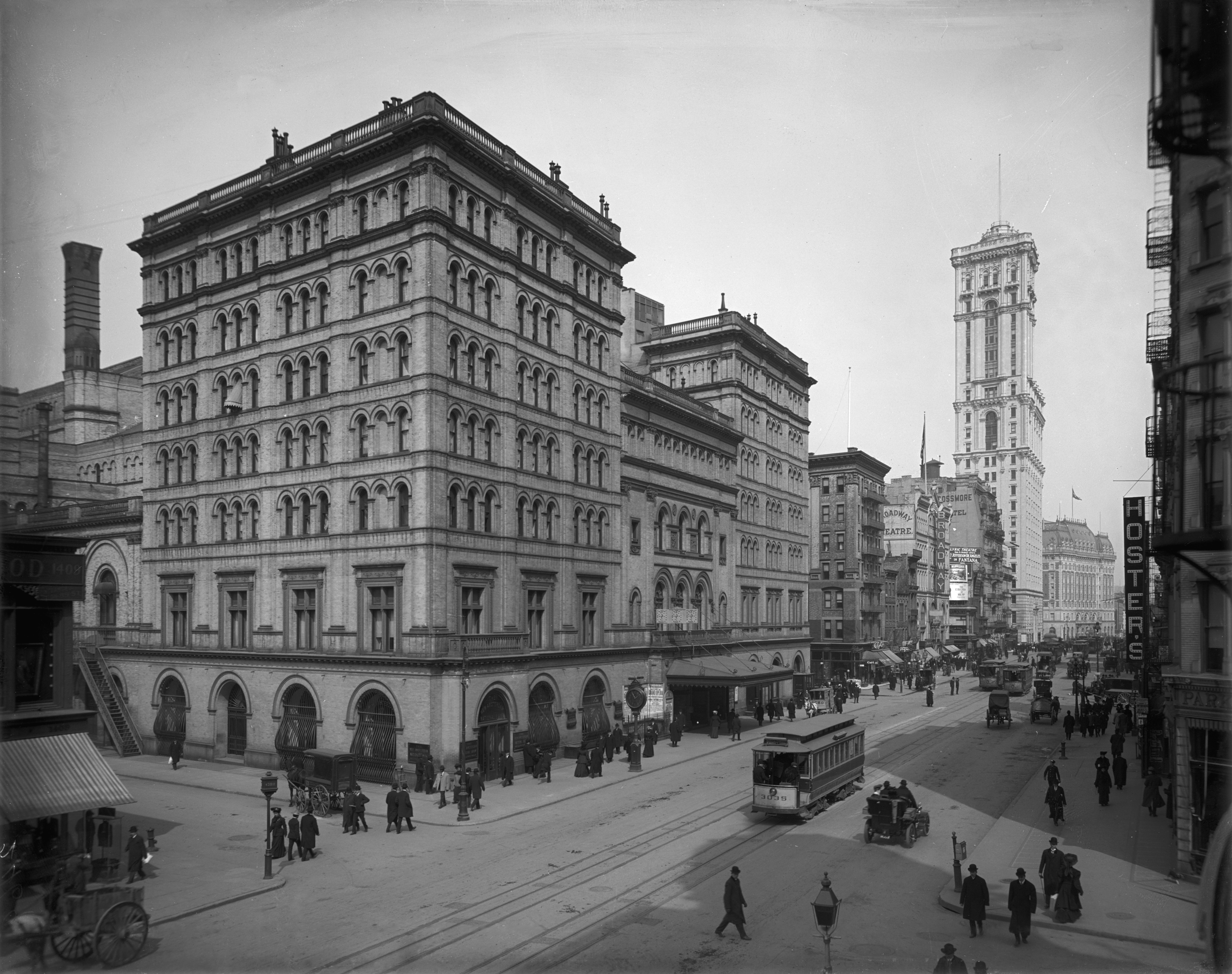
Rockefeller Center originated as a plan to replace the old Metropolitan Opera House (pictured).

In 1926, the Metropolitan Opera started looking for a location for a new opera house to replace its building at 39th Street and Broadway. By 1928, Benjamin Wistar Morris and designer Joseph Urban were hired to come up with blueprints. The planned building was too expensive for the Met to fund by itself, and John D. Rockefeller Jr. was eventually persuaded to support the project (his father, John D. Rockefeller Sr., was not involved). To determine its viability, Rockefeller hired Todd, Robertson and Todd as design consultants. John R. Todd put forth a plan for the Met. Columbia leased the plot to Rockefeller for 87 years at a cost of $3 million per year, excluding some properties on Fifth Avenue and a strip on Sixth Avenue. The initial cost of acquiring the space, razing some of the existing buildings, and constructing new buildings was estimated at $250 million.

To design the buildings, Rockefeller hired three firms: Corbett, Harrison & MacMurray; Hood, Godley & Fouilhoux; and Reinhard & Hofmeister. They worked under the umbrella of "Associated Architects" so none of the buildings could be attributed to any specific firm. The principal architect and leader of the Associated Architects was Raymond Hood, a student of the Art Deco architectural movement. The other architects included Harvey Wiley Corbett and Wallace Harrison. The principal builder and "managing agent" was Todd, who hired L. Andrew Reinhard and Henry Hofmeister as the "rental architects": designers of the complex's floor plans. The Metropolitan Square Corporation—the precursor to Rockefeller Center Inc.—was formed in December 1928 to oversee construction.

After the stock market crash of 1929, the Metropolitan Opera could no longer afford to move, and its plans were canceled on December 6, 1929. Rockefeller quickly entered negotiations with Radio Corporation of America (RCA) and its subsidiaries, National Broadcasting Company (NBC) and Radio-Keith-Orpheum (RKO), and by May 1930, persuaded them to build a mass media entertainment complex on the site. Todd released a new plan "G-3" in January 1930, followed by an "H plan" that March. Another plan, announced in March 1931, received mostly negative feedback from the public. The design of the complex was shaped by the city's 1916 Zoning Resolution, which required setbacks to buildings' high street-side exterior walls to increase sunlight on city streets. (Note: As per the 1916 Zoning Act, the wall of any given tower that faces a street could only rise to a certain height, proportionate to the street's width, at which point the building had to be set back by a given proportion. This system of setbacks would continue until the tower reaches a floor level in which that level's floor area was 25% that of the ground level's area. After that 25% threshold was reached, the building could rise without restriction. This law was superseded by the 1961 Zoning Resolution.) The plan also included rooftop gardens and a recessed central plaza. The International Complex, announced in 1931, replaced an earlier plan for an oval retail building; its name was derived by the British, French, and Italian tenants who eventually occupied it.

During early planning, the development was often referred to as "Radio City", "Rockefeller City", or "Metropolitan Square" (after the Metropolitan Square Corporation). Ivy Lee, the Rockefeller family's publicity adviser, suggested changing the name to "Rockefeller Center". John Rockefeller Jr. initially did not want the Rockefeller family name associated with the commercial project, but was persuaded on the grounds that the name would attract far more tenants. The name was formally changed in December 1931. Over time, the appellation of "Radio City" devolved from describing the entire complex to just the complex's western section, and by 1937, only the Radio City Music Hall contained the "Radio City" name.

=== Construction ===
For the project, 228 buildings on the site were razed and some 4,000 tenants displaced. Demolition of the properties began in 1930. All of the buildings' leases had been bought by August 1931, though there were some tenants on the western and southeastern edges of the plot who refused to leave their property, and Rockefeller Center was built around these buildings. Excavation of the Sixth Avenue side of the complex began in July 1931, and construction on the first buildings, Radio City Music Hall and the Center Theatre, began later that year. Fourteen million cubic feet (400,000 m^{3}) of Indiana limestone were ordered for the project in December 1931, the largest such order at the time.

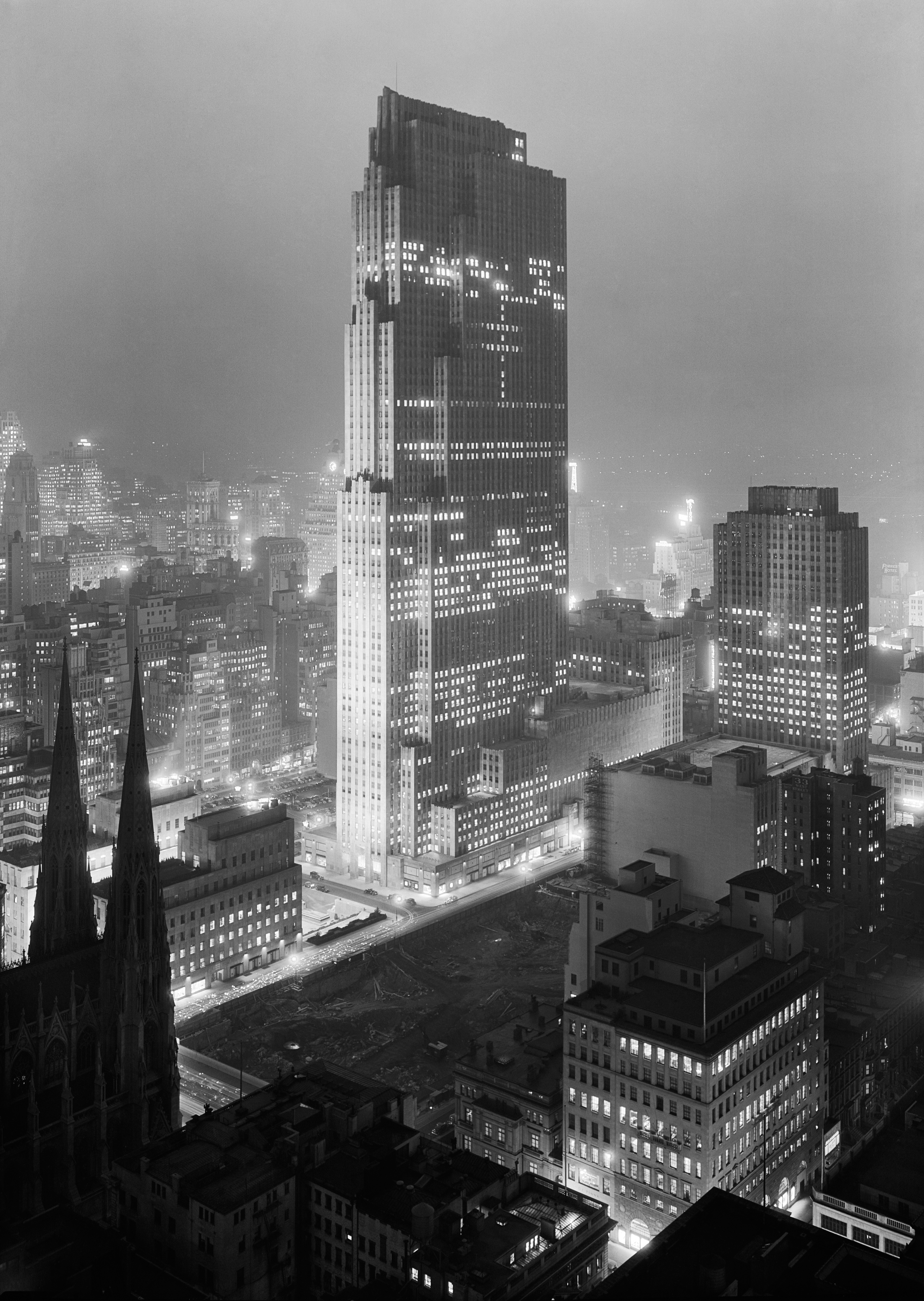
Construction progress in December 1933

The RKO Building was the first structure to be completed, in September 1932, followed by the Music Hall in December 1932 and the British Empire Building in April 1933. The RCA Building's opening was delayed from May 1 to mid-May because of a controversy over Man at the Crossroads, a painting in the building's lobby, which was later covered up and removed. A new street through the complex, Rockefeller Plaza, was constructed in stages between 1933 and 1937. The complex's famed Christmas tree in the center of the plaza was erected for the first time in December 1933, and the complex's Prometheus statue was constructed in May 1934. By July 1934, the complex had leased 80% of the available space in the six buildings that were already opened.

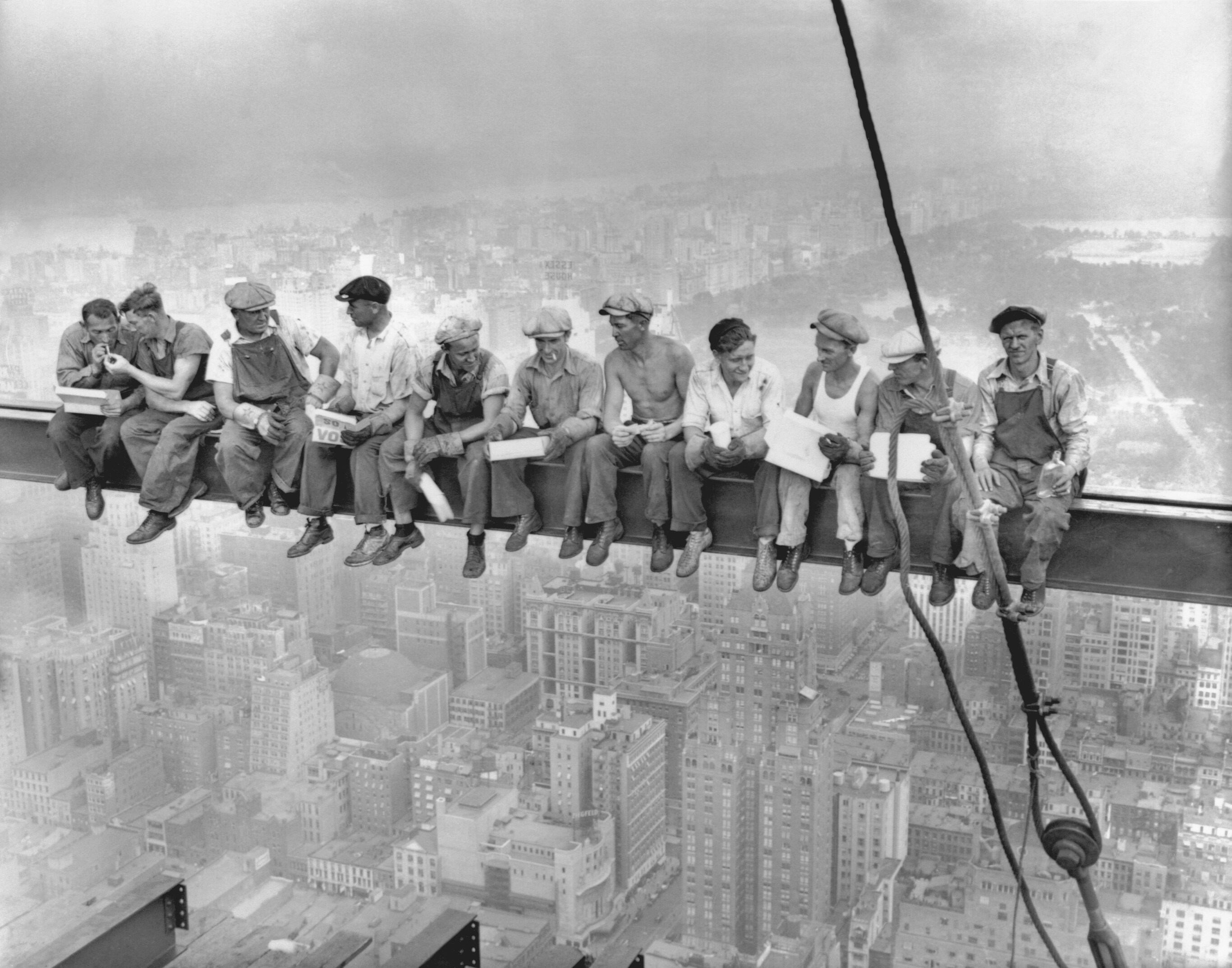
The iconic photograph Lunch atop a Skyscraper depicts workers resting for a meal during the construction of 30 Rockefeller Plaza.

Work on two more internationally themed retail buildings and a larger, 38-story, 512-foot (156 m) "International Building", started in September 1934. One of the two small buildings was already rented to Italian interests. The final small building would have been rented by Germany, but Rockefeller ruled this out in 1934 after noticing National Socialist extremism from the country's government. The empty office site was downsized and became the "International Building North", rented by various international tenants. In April 1935, developers opened the International Building and its wings.

The underground pedestrian mall and ramp system between 48th and 51st streets was finished in early May. In 1936, an ice skating rink replaced the unprofitable retail space on the lower plaza, below ground level.

The 36-story Time & Life Building, (Note: The "Time-Life Building" appellation would later apply to 1271 Avenue of the Americas, also located in the Rockefeller Center, which opened in 1959. Afterward, the original Time & Life Building became known as 1 Rockefeller Plaza.) named for anchor tenant Time Inc., was completed in November 1936, replacing an empty plot on the southern block that had been used for vehicle parking. Eleven buildings had been completed by 1937 at a total cost of over $100 million. A building for Associated Press on the northern block's empty lot, was topped out by June 1938 and occupied by December of that year. The presence of Associated Press and Time Inc. expanded Rockefeller Center's scope from strictly a radio-communications complex to a hub of both radio and print media. The Guild, a newsreel theater, opened in 1938 along the curve of the truck ramp below the Associated Press Building. After Nelson Rockefeller became president of Rockefeller Center in 1938, he fired John Todd as the complex's manager and appointed Hugh Robertson in his place. The Rockefeller family started occupying the 56th floor of the RCA Building, though the offices would later expand to the 54th and 55th floors as well.

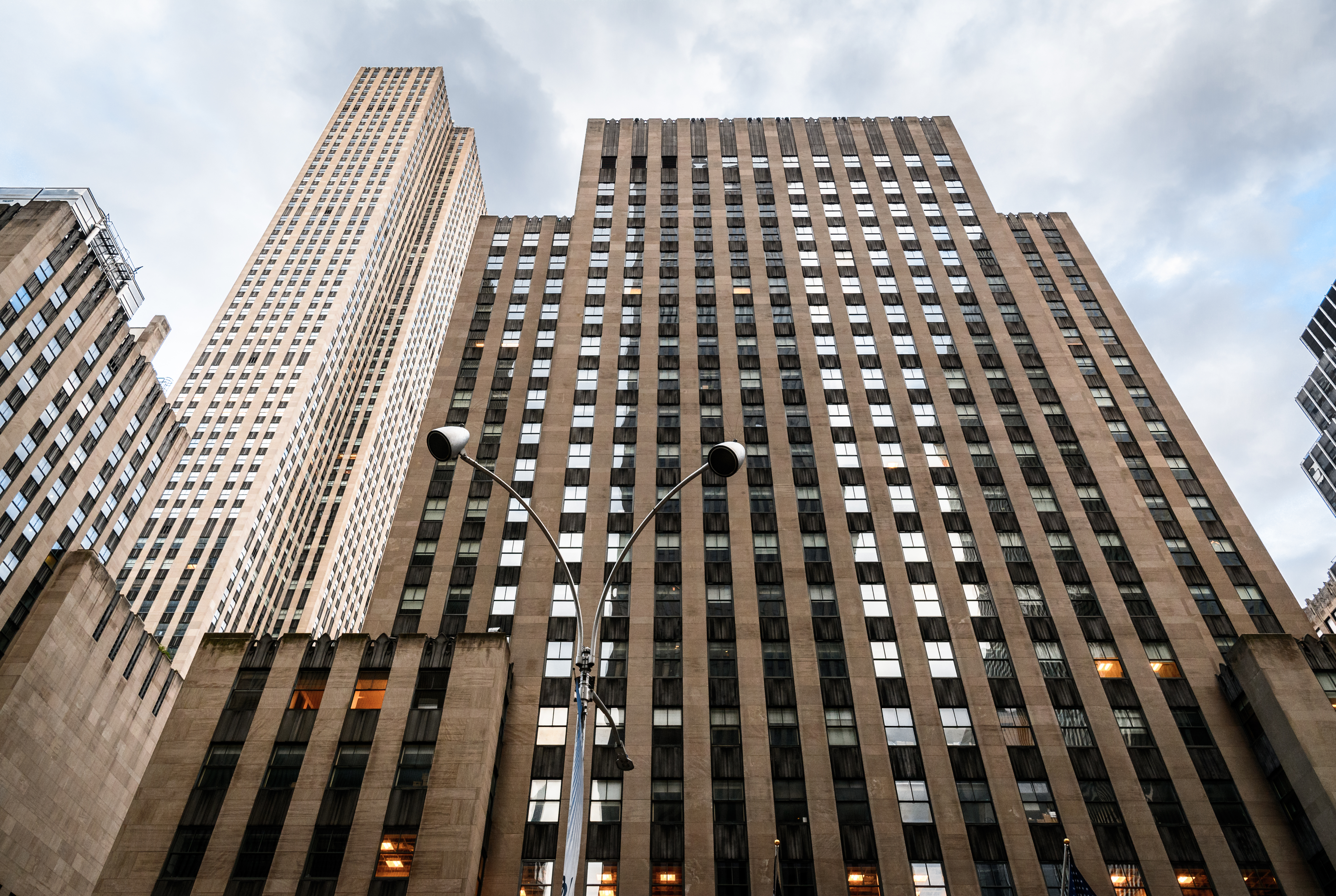
1230 Avenue of the Americas (originally the U.S. Rubber Company Building) is the most recently built structure in the original complex.

A proposed 16-story building in the center of the southernmost block was leased to Eastern Air Lines in June 1940. Excavation started in October 1938, and the building was topped out by April 1939. At the same time, Rockefeller Center Inc. wanted to develop the western half of the southern plot, which was partially occupied by the Center Theatre. The United States Rubber Company agreed to occupy the plot, and excavation of the U.S. Rubber Company Building site commenced in May 1939. John Rockefeller installed the building's ceremonial final rivet on November 1, 1939, marking the completion of the original complex. However, although the final rivet had been driven, the Eastern Air Lines Building was not completed until October 1940.

The construction of the project employed between 40,000 and 60,000 people. The complex was the largest private building project ever undertaken in contemporary times. Architectural historian Carol Herselle Krinsky describes the center as "the only large private permanent construction project planned and executed between the start of the Depression and the end of the Second World War". According to writer Daniel Okrent, Rockefeller Center was so extensive that it was said that "you could do anything you wanted except sleep (no hotels), pray (no churches), or not pay rent to [John Rockefeller Jr.]". By fall 1939, the complex had 26,000 tenants and 125,000 daily visitors. That year, 1.3 million people went on a guided tour of Rockefeller Center or visited the RCA Building's observation deck, while 6 million people visited the underground shopping mall, and 7 million saw a performance at Rockefeller Center.

=== World War II era ===
Even before the U.S. officially entered World War II in 1941, Rockefeller Center was affected by the war. The Dutch government had been slated to take up one-fifth of the space at 10 Rockefeller Plaza, but could not do so because of the war. Seven of the complex's eight travel agencies had to move elsewhere because of the war, and William Rhodes Davis, a tenant who shipped oil to Nazi Germany and fascist Italy, was denied a lease renewal in 1941. After the attack on Pearl Harbor on December 7, 1941, Rockefeller Center Inc. terminated all lease agreements with German, Italian, and Japanese tenants because their respective countries comprised the Axis powers, whom the United States were fighting against. Art on Palazzo d'Italia was taken down because they were seen as being fascist, and the Rainbow Room was closed to the public from 1943 to 1950. Instructions for blackouts and sandbags for extinguishing fires were placed throughout the complex. During the war, the RCA Building's Room 3603 became the primary location of the U.S. operations of British Intelligence's British Security Co-ordination, organized by William Stephenson. It also served as the office of Allen Dulles, who would later head the Central Intelligence Agency.

Rockefeller Center only became profitable after the last building in the original complex was completed. The complex had incurred $26 million in debt by 1935, which had increased to $39 million by 1940. However, the complex was already 87% rented by 1940, and by the next year, Rockefeller Center was nearly fully rented, making a profit for the first time in its history. By 1944, the complex's existing rentable area totaled 5,290,000 square feet (491,000 m^{2}), with 99.7% of the space being leased. Because the complex was almost completely rented, Rockefeller Center's managers kept waiting lists of potential tenants, and as a result of the waiting lists, the complex's office space became more desirable to these tenants. Two years later, there were 400 companies who wanted to rent space in Rockefeller Center, and the complex's managers determined that they would need to add 1,000,000 square feet (93,000 m^{2}) of space in order to house all the prospective tenants. Rockefeller Center was also popular among visitors: for instance, the lines to enter one of the Music Hall's five daily shows stretched from Sixth Avenue and 50th Street to Fifth Avenue and 52nd Street, a distance of four blocks.

In light of the abundance of possible renters, John Rockefeller Jr. transferred his ownership of the complex to his sons. The father collected the $57.5 million loan that Rockefeller Center Inc. owed him, then distributed it to his sons in the form of a tax break. Rockefeller Center eventually became the family's "single largest repository" of wealth. In 1950, Rockefeller Center Inc. paid the last installment of the $65 million mortgage owed to the Metropolitan Life Insurance Company. Three years later, the complex was making $5 million per year in profit, excluding the tax breaks.

=== Post-World War II expansion ===
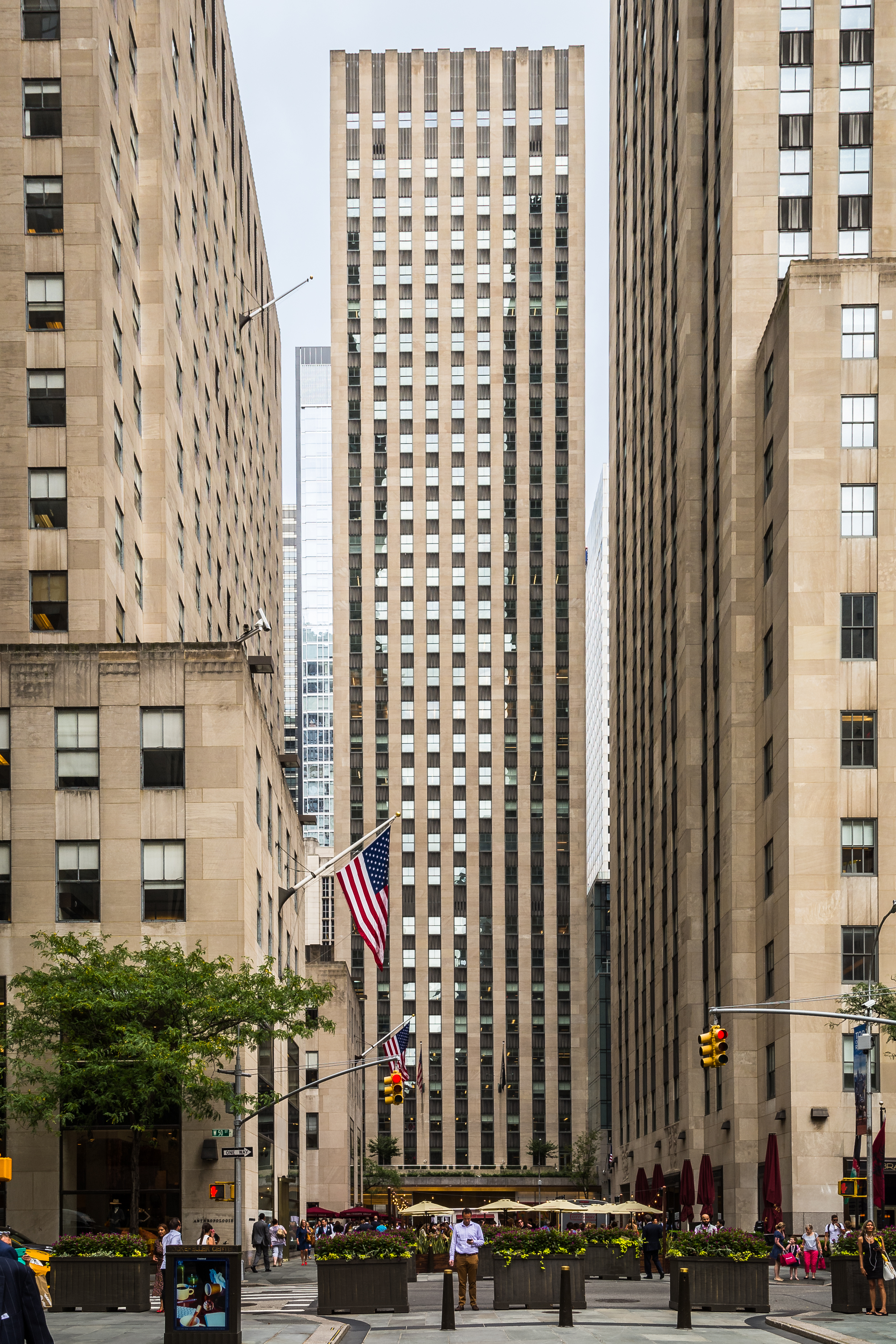
75 Rockefeller Plaza, built in 1947

Rockefeller Center Inc. had started working on plans to expand the complex during World War II, even though the outbreak of the war had stopped almost all civilian construction projects. In 1943, the complex's managers bought land and buildings on three street corners near the complex. Rockefeller Center unveiled plans for expansion to the southwest and north in 1944.

Esso (now Exxon) was one of the tenants who wanted to expand, and the company signaled that it would build its own office tower if Rockefeller Center's managers did not construct a building for them. They were given land at the north end of Rockefeller Plaza. In February 1947, the under-construction Esso Building, at the north end of the existing property, became part of Rockefeller Center after ownership of the building was transferred from the Haswin Corporation to Rockefeller Center, Inc. The building was topped out the next month. Hugh Robertson stepped down as manager the next year, and he was replaced by Gustav Eyssell.

Some tenants, such as the Sinclair Oil Corporation, indicated that they wanted to leave the complex after their leases expired in 1962–1963 because the original complex's buildings did not have air conditioning, while newer office buildings did. As Columbia University still owned the land underneath the complex, they were tasked with installing air conditioning in the buildings. The new building would add emphasis to any north–south views of the center, since the existing complex's building only formed west–east axes. Another problem befell Rockefeller Center's key tenants, NBC and RCA, who were approached by other developers with the promise of more leasable space, a commodity that was scarce in the fully leased complex. These problems were pushed aside temporarily by the onset of the Korean War in 1950. By 1951, Columbia had acquiesced to reimbursing Rockefeller Center, Inc., for AC installation if their lease was not renewed upon its termination in 1962, while NBC and RCA were given permission to use the Center Theatre for extra broadcasting space.

In 1949, in the face of a shrinking congregation, the St. Nicholas Church leased the church building to the Massachusetts Mutual Life Insurance Company, who then leased three contiguous plots from Rockefeller Center for a proposed 28-story building. The congregation was dispersed to other churches, and the old church building at Fifth Avenue and 48th Street was subsequently demolished. Construction commenced on 600 Fifth Avenue in 1950, and the tower was completed by 1952. The building was named after the Sinclair Oil Company, who leased eight floors. As a result of Sinclair's relocation to 600 Fifth Avenue, as well as Esso's relocation to 75 Rockefeller Plaza, NBC and RCA could expand into the space that Sinclair and Esso formerly occupied in the original complex, and they moved out of the Center Theatre shortly after the Sinclair Oil Company moved into its own tower. In mid-1953, Columbia bought all of the land along Sixth Avenue that had been owned by the Underel Corporation at a cost of $5.5 million. Rockefeller Center leased the land back from Columbia and extended its lease for the entire complex until 1973 for an additional $200,000 a year. The longer lease duration allowed Rockefeller Center the opportunity to amortize the cost of the installation of air conditioning. Rockefeller Center management was able to further reduce the impact on its balance sheet of the air conditioning installation by passing on some costs to the remaining tenants in return for lease extensions.

The small Center Theatre was deemed redundant to the Radio City Music Hall, and in its final years, had been used as an NBC and RCA broadcasting space. After NBC and RCA expanded into the floor area formerly occupied by Sinclair, the U.S. Rubber Company indicated that it wanted to expand its office building into the space that was taken up by the underused theater. In October 1953, it was announced that the theater would be demolished. It was demolished in 1954.

Time-Life also wanted to expand, as its existing space in 1 Rockefeller Plaza was also becoming insufficient. In August 1953, Rockefeller Center, Inc., bought a tract of land on the west side of Sixth Avenue between 50th and 51st streets. In 1956, two years after the demolition of the Center Theatre, officials announced the construction of a new tower, the Time-Life Building, on that plot. The 500-foot (150 m), $7 million building would include connections to the existing passageway system and to Roxy's Theater directly to its west. Time Inc. and Rockefeller Center formed a joint venture, Rock-Time Inc., which would share the tower's rent income between Time Inc. and Rockefeller Center. Construction on the Time-Life Building's steelwork started in April 1958, and the structure topped out in November of that year. The building officially opened in December 1959.

Around 1960, Rockefeller Center, Uris Buildings Corporation, and Webb and Knapp formed another joint venture, Rock-Uris Corp. Originally, the venture wanted to construct a hotel to the west of 75 Rockefeller Center, but ultimately, a glass-and-concrete 43-story office building was built on the site. In 1961, the building was named after Sperry Corporation, who leased eight floors in the future building. The hotel, New York Hilton at Rockefeller Center, was built two blocks north in 1963.

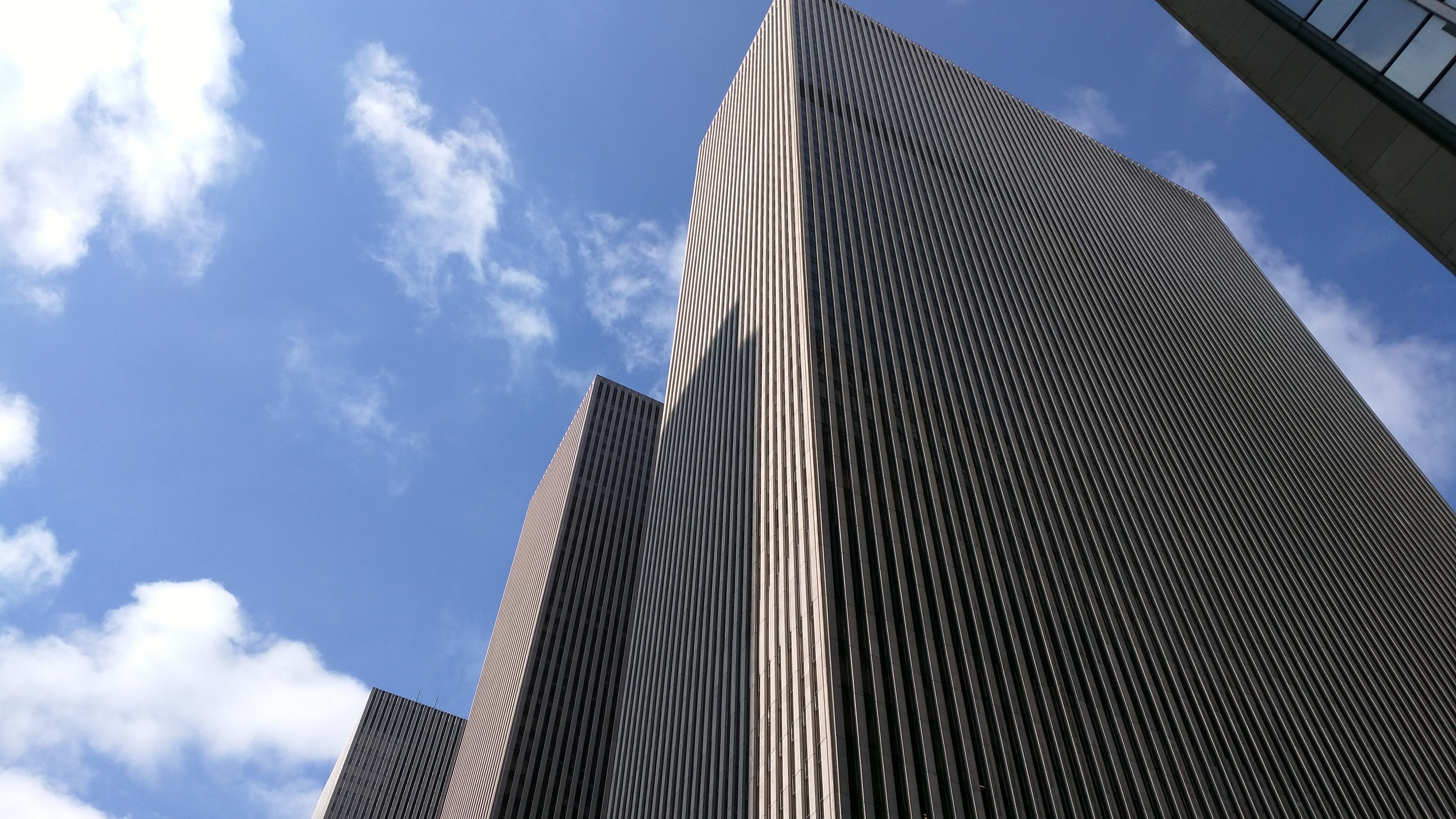
1251 Avenue of the Americas (1965). 1221 (1966) and 1211 (1968) are visible to the left and far left, respectively.

600 Fifth Avenue was sold to Rockefeller Center's managers in 1963, thus officially becoming part of Rockefeller Center. The same year, officials from Esso (later renamed Exxon) proposed a new building for the complex because the company had outgrown the space in the buildings it already occupied. Rockefeller Center's managers hired the architectural firm Harrison & Abramovitz to design three new towers on the west side of Sixth Avenue, with one tower on each block between 47th and 50th streets. The Exxon Building, at 1251 Avenue of the Americas between 49th and 50th streets, was formally announced in August 1967. Three months later, officials also announced plans for a tower housing McGraw-Hill, located one block south at 1221 Avenue of the Americas. Plans for a tower anchored by Celanese, to be located at 1211 Avenue of the Americas between 47th and 48th streets, would not be revealed until 1970. The Exxon Building opened in 1971, followed by the McGraw-Hill Building in 1973 and the Celanese Building in 1974. By the time all three of the new buildings were opened, Rockefeller Center contained 7% of Manhattan's 250,000,000 square feet (23,000,000 m^{2}) of leasable office space.

=== 1970s and 1980s ===
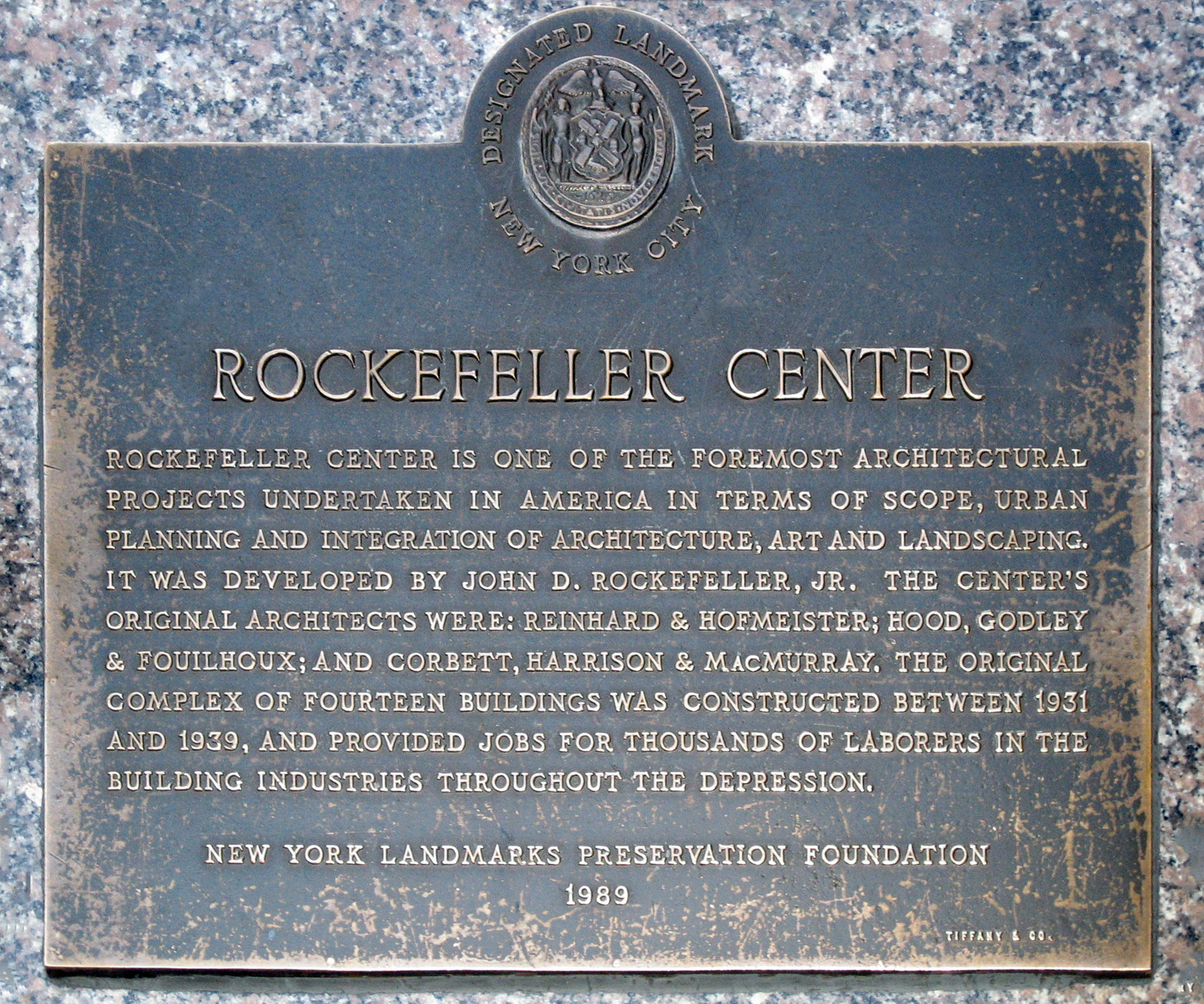
Rockefeller Center's landmark plaque

600 Fifth Avenue and 75 Rockefeller Plaza received renovations in the early 1970s. Unlike in the rest of the complex, where different components were renovated one at a time to avoid disturbing tenants, the two structures were renovated all at once because their space was largely vacant. Rockefeller Center Inc. renewed their lease on the complex in 1973.

Through the 1960s, the Music Hall was successful regardless of the status of the city's economic, business, or entertainment sectors as a whole. However, by the early 1970s, the proliferation of closed-captioned foreign movies had reduced attendance at the Music Hall. The first round of staff and performer firings began in 1972. By January 1978, the Music Hall was in debt, and the hall's annual attendance had declined to 1.5 million visitors, down from 5 million in 1968. Officials stated that it could not remain open after April. A grassroots campaign formed the Showpeople's Committee to Save Radio City Music Hall. After several weeks of lobbying, the New York City Landmarks Preservation Commission (LPC) designated the theater as an interior city landmark in March, followed by a National Register of Historic Places listing in May. The hall was set to close on April 12, but five days before the planned closing date, the Empire State Development Corporation voted to create a nonprofit subsidiary to lease the Music Hall.

A New York Times report in 1982 stated that Rockefeller Center had been popular among tenants from its inception, being almost fully rented for much of the first half-century of its existence. The major exception was in the 1970s, when it was only 85 percent rented. However, Rockefeller Center was not popular as an entertainment complex, having been used for mainly commercial purposes through its history. The LPC held hearings in 1983 to determine how much of Rockefeller Center should be protected as a landmark. The Rockefeller family and Columbia University acknowledged that the buildings were already symbolically landmarks, but their spokesman John E. Zuccotti recommended that only a small section (including the RCA Building, Lower Plaza, and Channel Gardens) should be protected. By contrast, almost everyone else who supported Rockefeller Center's landmark status recommended that the entire complex be landmarked. The LPC granted landmark status to the exteriors of all of the original complex's buildings, as well as the interiors of the International Building's and 30 Rockefeller Plaza's lobbies, on April 23, 1985. In its approval of the complex's landmark status, the commission wrote, "Rockefeller Center ranks among the grandest architectural projects ever undertaken in the United States". The buildings became a National Historic Landmark two years later. The United States Department of the Interior wrote in its report that the center was "one of the most successful urban planning projects in the history of American architecture".

Columbia University was not making enough money from Rockefeller Center leases by the 1970s, since a series of negotiations with Rockefeller Center Inc. (now Rockefeller Group) had effectively reduced the annual lease payment to $11 million. The university's funds had dwindled so much that by 1972, their expenses were paid for by their endowment fund. In 1983, Columbia University started looking to sell the land beneath Rockefeller Center. On February 4, 1985, Columbia agreed to sell the land to the Rockefeller Group for $400 million. The Rockefeller Group immediately set out to modernize many aspects of the complex. The Rainbow Room was closed for a $20 million restoration and expansion that brought the restaurant's floor area to 4,500 square feet (420 m^{2}), and it reopened in December 1987. The RCA Building's observation deck was subsequently closed because the Rainbow Room's expansion eliminated the only passageway to the observatory's elevator bank. In mid-1988, the RCA Building was renamed the GE Building. Mitsubishi Estate, a real estate company of the Mitsubishi Group, purchased the Rockefeller Group in 1989.

=== 1990s to present ===
The Rockefeller Group filed for bankruptcy protection in May 1995 after missing several mortgage payments. That November, John Rockefeller Jr.'s son David and a consortium led by Goldman Sachs agreed to buy Rockefeller Center's buildings for $1.1 billion, beating out Sam Zell and other bidders. The consortium, which also included Gianni Agnelli and Stavros Niarchos, finalized its acquisition in July 1996. Before the sale was even completed, the consortium sold 1,600,000 square feet (150,000 m^{2}) of space in 30 Rockefeller Plaza to NBC, who had rented that space in the tower since the beginning. A preservation dispute arose in May 1998, when the owners announced plans to enlarge shop windows on the center's Fifth Avenue buildings to two stories. These windows were reduced in size upon the LPC's request, and the modifications were approved in September 1998. Due to the decline of the newsreel theater industry, the Guild was shuttered in late 1999 after Tishman Speyer decided not to renew its lease.

Tishman Speyer, led by David Rockefeller's close friend Jerry Speyer and the Lester Crown family of Chicago, bought the original 14 buildings and land in 2000 for $1.85 billion. With the sale, the Rockefeller family gave up its remaining interest in Rockefeller Center's operation. Tishman Speyer also decided to renovate the complex's retail spaces and underground concourse. The Rainbow Room closed in 2009 in preparation for an extensive renovation that started in 2011. The restaurant reopened in October 2014. The Rockefeller family moved out of their offices in the GE Building in 2014 due to rising rents. They re-settled in less expensive offices on 49th Street, near their old headquarters. The next year, in July 2015, the GE Building was renamed after Comcast, the parent company of NBCUniversal. Future Green installed temporary artwork in the Channel Gardens in 2019 to celebrate the 250th anniversary of David Hosack's birth.

In January 2020, Tishman Speyer hired Gabellini Sheppard Associates to design a renovation for Channel Gardens, Rockefeller Plaza, and the Lower Plaza. These plans included modifications to lighting, planting, pathways, and facades. The plans were approved that April. Gabellini Sheppard also proposed renovating the International Building's lobby. A rooftop garden above Radio City Music Hall opened in September 2021. Starting in 2022, a roller rink called Flipper's Roller Boogie Palace was set up in the Lower Plaza from April to October. In addition, 19 eateries opened within Rockefeller Center during the early 2020s, including 12 sit-down restaurants. In April 2023, Tishman Speyer proposed renovating ten of 10 Rockefeller Plaza's upper stories into a 130-room hotel. At the time, 93 percent of the complex's office space was leased, but the offices were largely empty during workdays. An event venue named Hero opened at Rockefeller Center that November. The Rockefeller Group also renovated the complex in the mid-2020s, adding restaurants and stores, and Tishman Speyer refinanced Rockefeller Center in October 2024 with a $3.5 billion loan.

== Buildings ==
Buildings of Rockefeller Center
Buildings and structures in Rockefeller Center:
1 1 Rockefeller Plaza
2 10 Rockefeller Plaza
3 La Maison Francaise
4 British Empire Building
5 30 Rockefeller Plaza
6 International Building
7 50 Rockefeller Plaza
8 1230 Avenue of the Americas
9 Radio City Music Hall
10 1270 Avenue of the Americas
11 75 Rockefeller Plaza
12 600 Fifth Avenue
13 608 Fifth Avenue
14 1271 Avenue of the Americas
15 1251 Avenue of the Americas
16 1221 Avenue of the Americas
17 1211 Avenue of the Americas

The current complex is a combination of two building complexes and a standalone building: 13 of the original Art Deco office buildings from the 1930s, one building across 51st Street built in 1947, and a set of four International-style towers built along the west side of Avenue of the Americas during the 1960s and 1970s. The center spans 22 acres (8.9 ha) in total, with some 17,000,000 square feet (1,600,000 m^{2}) in office space.

=== Landmarked buildings ===
The landmarked buildings comprise 12 acres (49,000 m^{2}) in Midtown, bounded by Fifth and Sixth avenues between 48th and 51st streets. Built as a cohesive unit, the buildings have been owned by Tishman Speyer since 2000. The buildings are spread along six blocks, with three blocks facing each avenue. These six blocks are the size of three standard blocks. One of the landmark buildings' defining features is the Indiana limestone facade possessed by all 14 structures, as specified in the original plans. All of the structures were designed by Associated Architects, with Raymond Hood as the principal architect, and are listed on the National Register of Historic Places.

==== Radio City complex ====
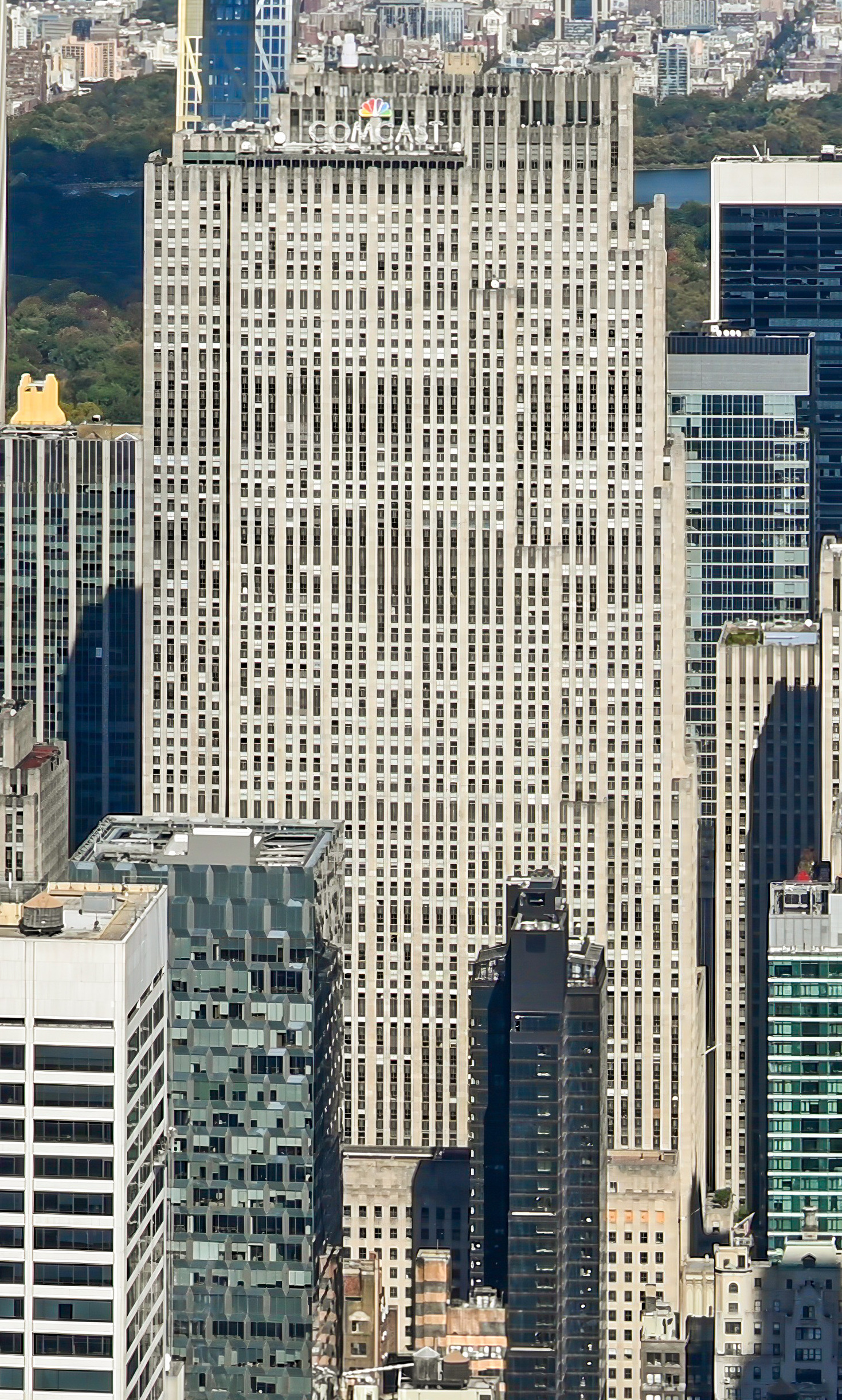
30 Rockefeller Plaza and its "Comcast" neon sign

The east side of Sixth Avenue, officially known as Avenue of the Americas, contains most of the buildings that were built specifically for the proposed radio complex. These buildings, which comprise "Radio City", are 1230 Avenue of the Americas, 30 Rockefeller Plaza, Radio City Music Hall and 1270 Avenue of the Americas. The idea for an integrated media complex somewhere came in 1920, when Owen D. Young, the chairman of RCA parent General Electric, suggested that RCA combine its then-disparate offices into one location.

The western half of the southernmost block of the complex along Sixth Avenue, between 48th and 49th streets, contains the former U.S. Rubber Company Building (now Simon & Schuster Building) at 1230 Avenue of the Americas. The last structure in the original complex to be built, it was topped out in November 1939. The 23-story building contains two 7-story wings on its north and south sides. It was renamed after Uniroyal in 1967, and again after Simon & Schuster in 1976. 1230 Avenue of the Americas was expanded to the east in 1954 after the Center Theatre adjacent to it was demolished. The 19-story annex, designed by Wallace Harrison and Max Abramovitz, had a glass facade on the lowest two stories—reflecting the design of the former American Airlines Building across Sixth Avenue—and a limestone facade above the second story. It is aligned with the axis of 10 Rockefeller Plaza on the eastern side of the block, and its northern and southern elevations contain five setbacks. The exterior also houses an abstract bas-relief created by Naum Gabo.

The Center Theatre, at 1236 Sixth Avenue, was the only structure in the original Rockefeller Center to be demolished. Originally the "RKO Roxy Theatre", it was renamed after Fox Theatres sued Roxy Rothafel over the naming rights to the nearby Roxy Theatre, which Rothafel had originally managed. The 3,700-seat Center Theatre had a short massing (general shape) in place due to height restrictions at the time, which prohibited construction above theater auditoriums. The theater's stage was enlarged for musicals in 1936, and four years later, 380 seats were removed in order to make way for an ice rink for skating spectaculars. It showed film, musicals, ice-skating competitions, and television through its 21-year existence. Due to its duplication of the larger Radio City Music Hall's activities, it was deemed uneconomical almost from its opening, and was considered redundant by the 1950s. In 1954, it was replaced by the expansion of 1230 Avenue of the Americas.

The block immediately to the north, on Sixth Avenue between 49th and 50th streets, is occupied by 30 Rockefeller Plaza and its western annex at 1250 Sixth Avenue. The 70-floor, 872-foot-tall (266 m) building anchors the entire complex, and is located on the eastern side of the block. Opened in 1933 as the RCA Building, the building has been renamed multiple times, first to the GE Building in 1988, after General Electric bought RCA, and then to the Comcast Building in 2014 after Comcast's purchase of NBCUniversal. 30 Rockefeller Plaza was built as a single structure occupying the entire block between Sixth Avenue and Rockefeller Plaza, and its design was influenced by John Todd's desire for the building to use its air rights to their maximum potential. It has three main segments: the 66-story tower rising from the eastern part of the base with the famous Rainbow Room restaurant on the 65th floor, and, formerly, the Rockefeller family office; a windowless segment in the middle of the base that houses NBC Studios; and a shorter 16-story tower on the western part of the base at 1250 Avenue of the Americas. As an icon of the complex, 30 Rockefeller Plaza's architecture influenced the design of the rest of the complex, with its limestone facade and Gothic-inspired four-leafed spandrels.

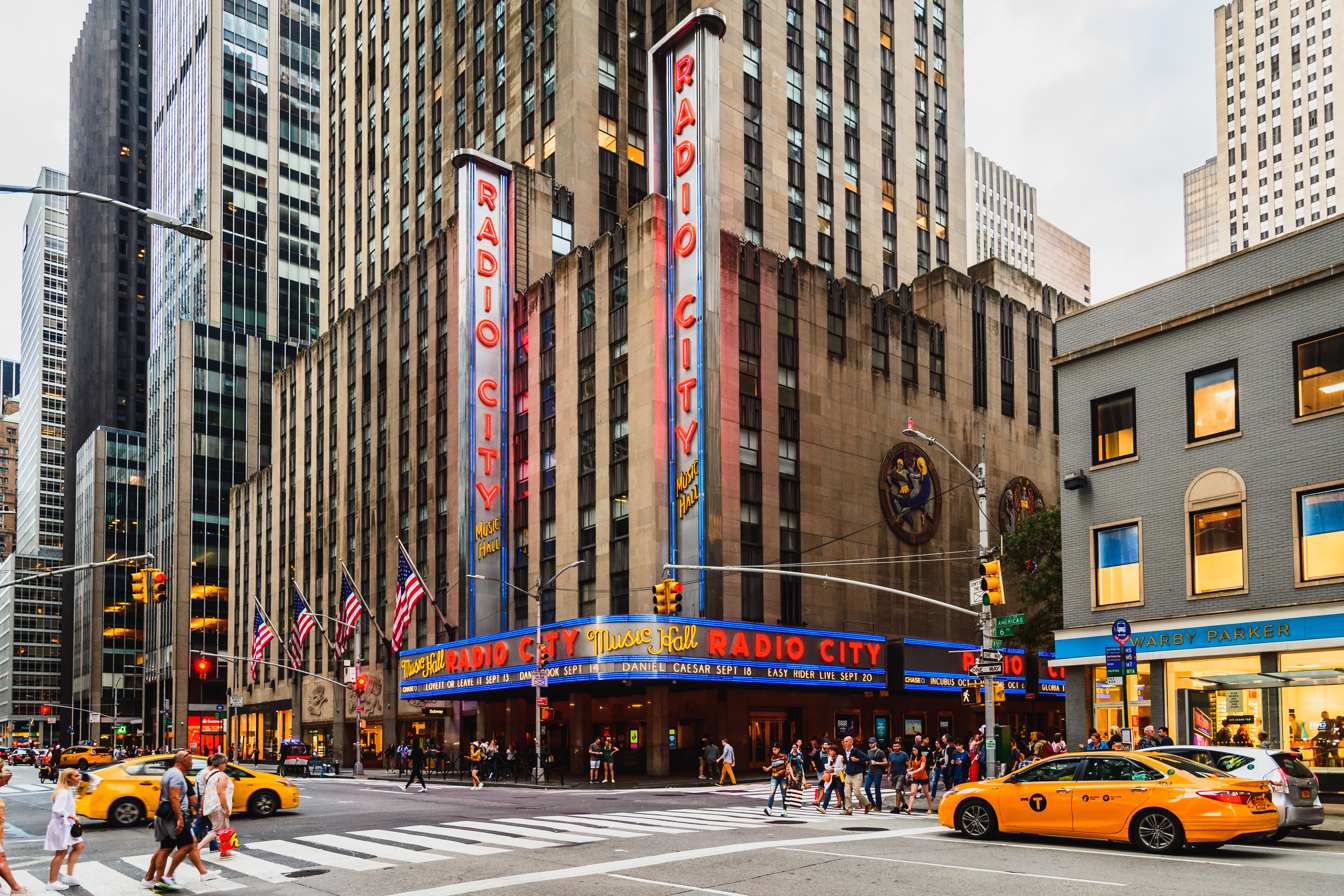
The southwest corner of Radio City Music Hall, as seen diagonally across the intersection of Sixth Avenue and 50th Street

Radio City Music Hall (colloquially "Radio City") at 1260 Avenue of the Americas, occupying the southwestern portion of the block between 50th and 51st streets. The only remaining theater in the complex, it was similar in style to the Center Theatre, but at a larger scale. Construction started in December 1931, and the theater opened in December 1932. The 121-foot-high (37 m) theater seats 6,000 people, and since opening has seen over 300 million visitors. Located in a niche adjacent to the neighboring 1270 Avenue of the Americas, the Music Hall is housed under the building's seventh-floor setback.

The other building on the block between 50th and 51st streets is 1270 Avenue of the Americas, a 31-story structure with a setback on the sixth floor. Originally named the RKO Building for RKO Pictures, it was built over the Music Hall, and shares many of the same exterior architectural details. Construction of the building started in 1931, and the building was complete by September 1932. Henry Hofmeister designed the building, as well as several other office buildings in the city that were built over theaters. The building's entrance design, blending in with that of the other buildings in the Radio City section, is marked by three sculptural bas-reliefs created by Robert Garrison for each of the building's three bays, signifying muses of Contemporary Thought, Morning, and Evening. In 1990, Robert Kushner created three bronze sculptures of winged spirits for the lobby. The RKO Building served as headquarters for its namesake company in the 1930s, and was renamed for the American Metal Climax Company (AMAX), its new owners, in the early 1960s.

==== International complex ====
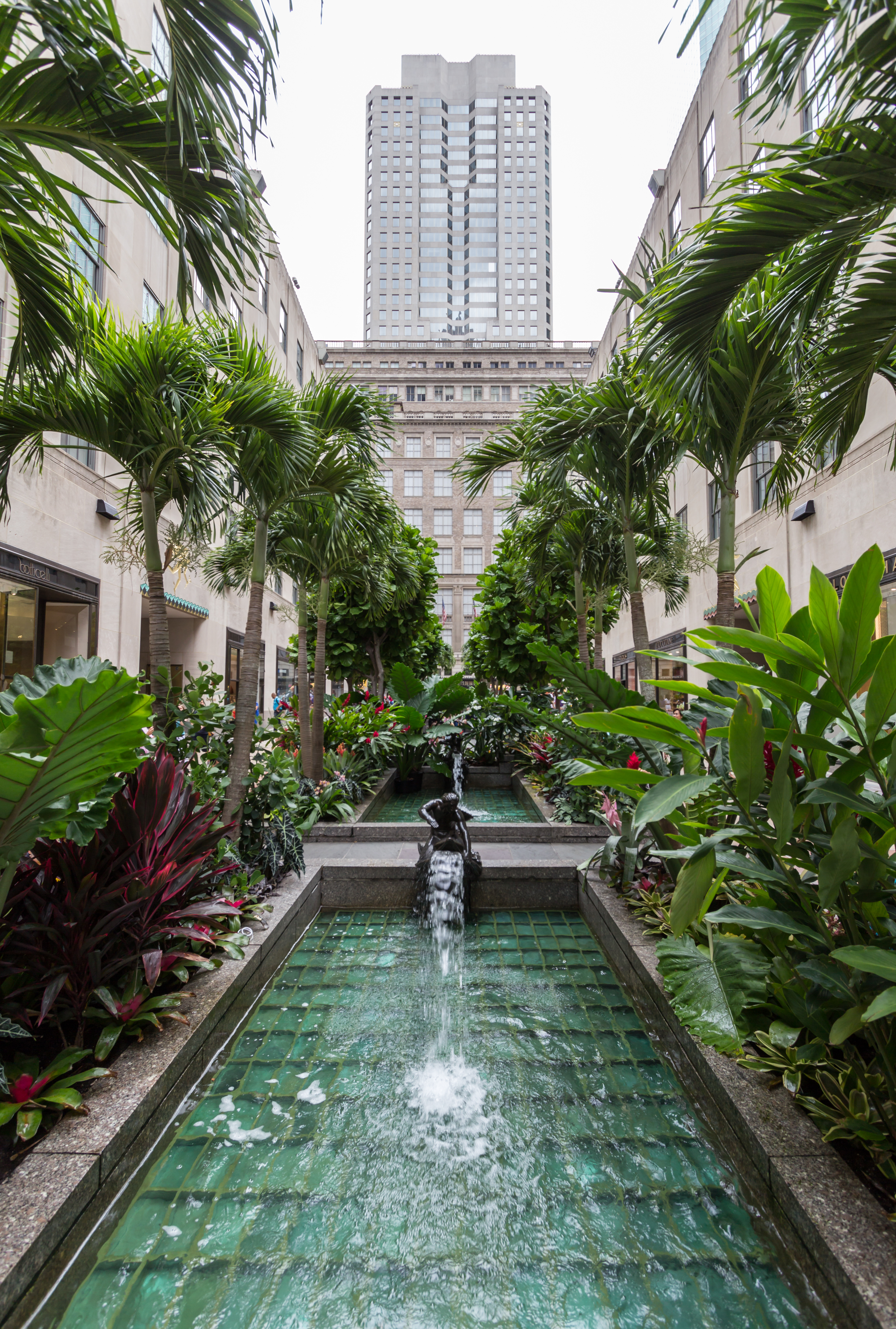
The Channel Gardens between the British and French buildings, facing the Saks Fifth Avenue flagship

The International Complex is along Fifth Avenue, with the 41-story International Building and four smaller country-themed structures with retail outlets. The tower and the two southern retail buildings—were planned after the cancellation of the incongruously designed oval retail building in 1931, while the two retail wings east of the International Building were designed later. The low rectangular structures that replaced the oval building were seen as a more suitable design for the avenue. The current international theme was decided on due to a lack of American tenants willing to rent there; eventually, the structures were occupied by British, French, and Italian interests, although the Italian interests ultimately were the only foreign tenants who rented for the long term.

All four retail the structures have identical limestone facades, roof gardens, and ground-floor storefronts, but differ in the artworks with which they were decorated. Contemporary advertisements for shopping on Fifth Avenue touted the complex's proximity to the Saks Fifth Avenue flagship store and St. Patrick's Cathedral. When viewed from Fifth Avenue, the buildings provide a foreground for the taller 30 Rockefeller Plaza building behind them. The Channel Gardens separate the British Empire Building and La Maison Francaise.

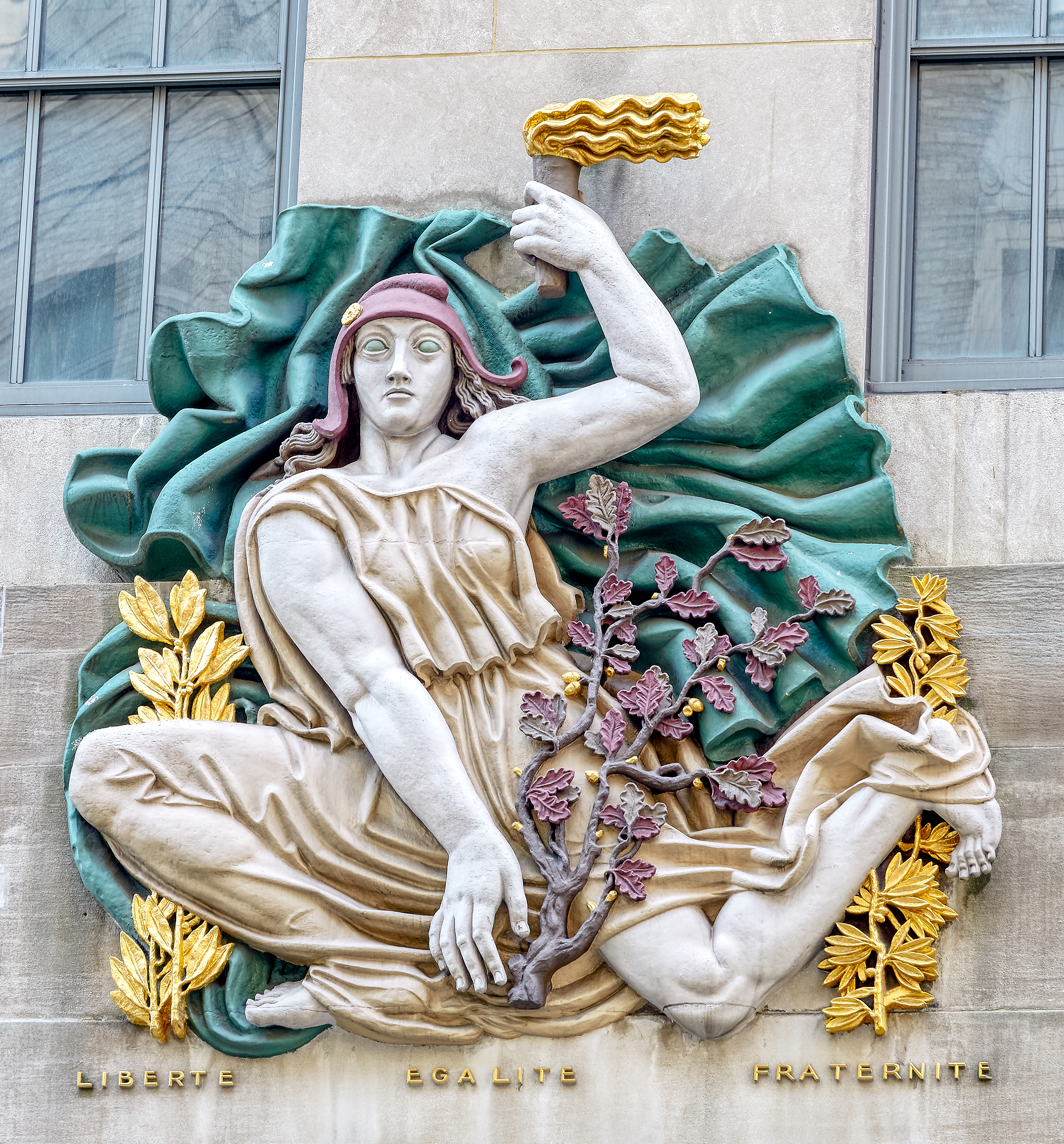
"Gallic Freedom" by Alfred Janniot, decorates La Maison Francaise

The southernmost of the four retail buildings is La Maison Francaise (literally "the French House") at 610 Fifth Avenue, which opened in October 1933. It is a six-story standalone building with a limestone facade with a sixth-story setback, as well as a partial 1 1/2-story penthouse on the west half of the seventh story and a garden on the east side of the seventh-story roof. Immediately across the Channel Gardens to the north of La Maison Francaise is its twin, the British Empire Building at 620 Fifth Avenue, which opened in April 1933. It is also a standalone building, with exactly the same massing asLa Maison Francaise, down to the setback, rooftop garden, and half-penthouse.

The 512-foot (156 m) International Building has the address 630 Fifth Avenue to its east, or 45 Rockefeller Plaza to its west. The tower stands at 41 stories high, including mechanical floors. One of two skyscrapers that opened in Manhattan in 1935, it was noted for its short 136-day duration of construction, as well as the construction quality, overall design, and materials used. The building, located in the middle of the block between Rockefeller Plaza and Fifth Avenue, contains a central plaza on its east, facing the Fifth Avenue entrance, which contains the famous statue of Atlas. The Palazzo d'Italia and International Building North serve as six-story retail wings of the International Building. The Palazzo d'Italia is at 626 Fifth Avenue, on the south side of the plaza, while International Building North is at 636 Fifth Avenue, north of the plaza.

==== Other buildings ====
The 36-story tower at 1 Rockefeller Plaza, on the east side of the plaza between 48th and 49th streets, is the original Time & Life Building that was opened in April 1937. Time Inc. itself did not move into the building for another year after its completion. In 1960, the building was renamed for General Dynamics after Time Inc. had moved into 1271 Avenue of the Americas, the new Time-Life Building located three blocks away. The tower was renamed for its street address after General Dynamics moved to St. Louis in 1971.

10 Rockefeller Plaza is located opposite 1 Rockefeller, on the west side of the plaza. Its planning name was the Holland House, but the Dutch government did not sign on, so the building became the Eastern Air Lines Building instead. 10 Rockefeller was built as a 16-story slab, basically a miniature version of 1 Rockefeller. 10 Rockefeller's six-story parking garage was the first in Rockefeller Center. Notable modern tenants include the Today Show studios, and since 2005, the Nintendo New York store.

50 Rockefeller Plaza, formerly the Associated Press Building, is located on the west side of Rockefeller Plaza between 50th and 51st streets. It was constructed in the spring of 1938. The only building in the Center built to the outer limits of its lot line, the 15-story building took its shape from Associated Press's need for a single, undivided, loft-like newsroom as large as the lot could accommodate—namely, a 200-by-187-foot (61 by 57 m) blocky structure with no setbacks.

600 Fifth Avenue, at the corner of Fifth Avenue and 48th Street, opened in 1952, after the other buildings in the main complex had been built. The 28-story tower was once also known as the Sinclair Oil Building and the Manufacturers Hanover Trust Company Building. Its L-shaped footprint surrounds another building at the corner of 49th Street and Fifth Avenue, such that it fronts 200 feet (61 m) on 48th Street, 100 feet (30 m) on Fifth Avenue, but only 63 feet (19 m) midblock on 49th Street. Carson and Lundin designed 600 Fifth Avenue, along with 666 Fifth Avenue three blocks north, to complement the Rockefeller complex between the two towers. 600 Fifth Avenue contains a limestone facade, consistent with that of the original complex, as well as a seventh-story setback on its Fifth Avenue side and rooftop gardens on its setbacks. The building contains a main lobby at 48th Street, a service entrance to the same street, and a connection to 1 Rockefeller Plaza at its west end. Unlike other buildings in the complex, 600 Fifth Avenue's ground level only contained one public entrance to maximize the ground-floor retail space, which was originally leased by Swiss interests and Pan Am Airlines.

=== Later buildings ===
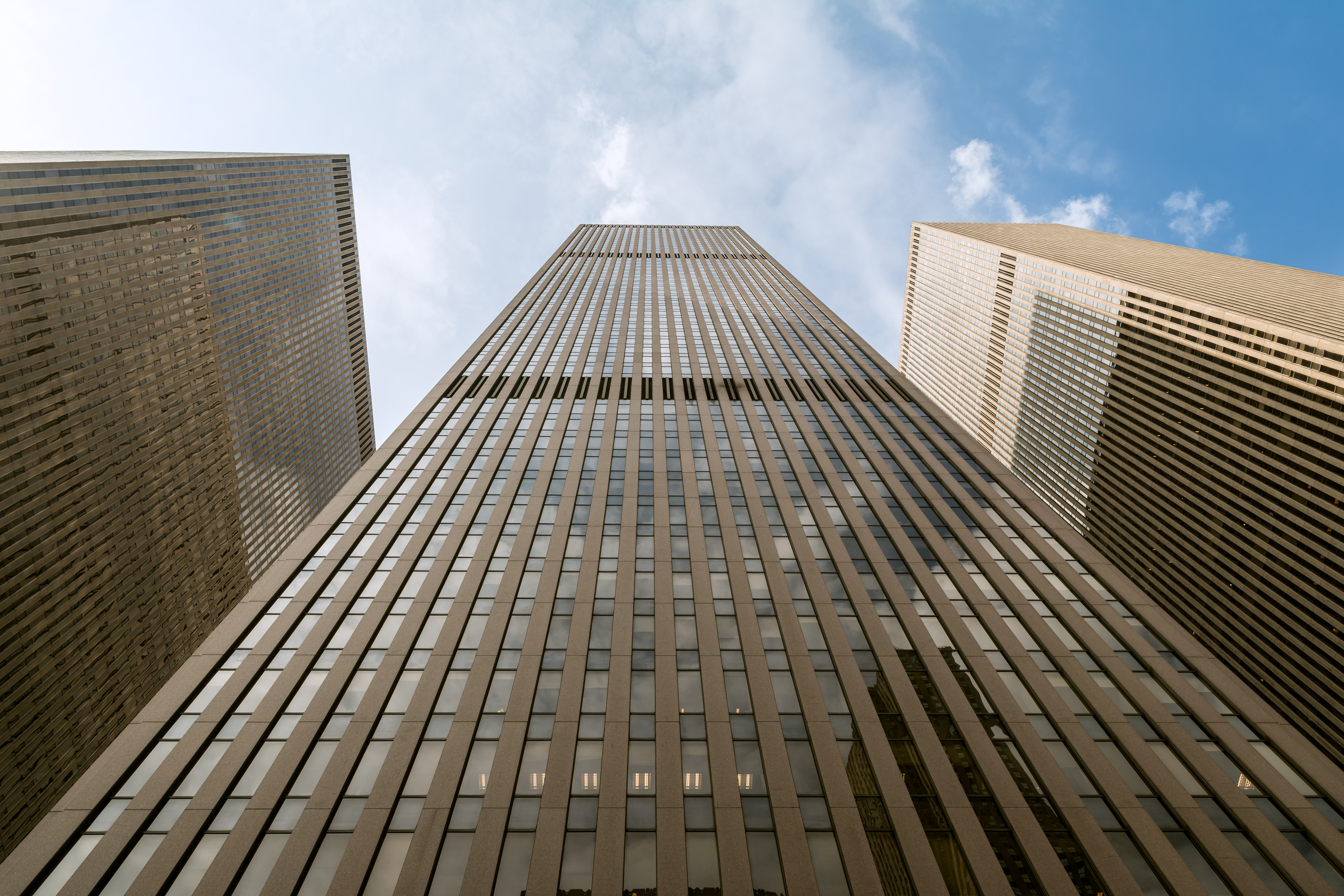
Looking up the facade of 1221 Avenue of the Americas. 1211 and 1251 are visible to the left and right, respectively.

The buildings subsequently added are separately owned by multiple owners. The first subsequent building to be built was 75 Rockefeller Plaza, at 51st Street on the north end of the complex, was built in 1947. The building contains a low base that is level with the rooftops of the low-rise buildings on 51st and 52nd Street, as well as a tall slab rising from the base, aligned in a north–south direction. It was originally built privately, but ownership was transferred to Rockefeller Center in February 1947. The 33-story, 400-foot (120 m) building was originally called the Esso Building. It was the headquarters of Standard Oil Company of New Jersey (later Exxon) until the early 1970s. The Esso Building was later renamed after Warner Communications, Time Warner and AOL Time Warner. It is owned by the estate of Mohamed Al Fayed, who died in 2023, and managed by RXR Realty under a 99-year lease that began in 2013.

The other four buildings were built as part of a single project on the west side of Sixth Avenue between 47th and 51st streets. Erected from 1958 through 1974, they were all built by the same firm, Harrison, Abramovitz & Harris. The $300 million project was part of a drive to get large companies such as Celanese Corporation, McGraw-Hill, Exxon, and Time Inc. to invest in the center. The new project added a combined 6,100,000 square feet (570,000 m^{2}) of space to the existing center when it was completed, and was attractive to potential tenants because of this. Four buildings are part of the newer Sixth Avenue expansion:

- 1211 Avenue of the Americas, the former Celanese Building, is located between 47th and 48th streets. The 592-foot-tall (180 m) tower opened in 1974. Also the News Corp Building, it is owned by an affiliate of Beacon Capital Partners, and leasing is managed by Cushman & Wakefield.
- 1221 Avenue of the Americas, the former McGraw-Hill Building, is located between 48th and 49th streets. The 674-foot-tall (205 m) building opened in 1973 and is owned by the Rockefeller Group.
- 1251 Avenue of the Americas, the former Exxon Building, is located between 49th and 50th streets. This 750-foot-tall (230 m) building was built from 1967 to 1971. Exxon's corporate headquarters moved into the structure in 1972, with co-ownership with Rockefeller Center's managers, and held an ownership stake there until 1986, when Mitsui & Company purchased the building. Exxon moved its headquarters to Texas in 1989, vacating all of the space in 1251 Avenue of the Americas.
- 1271 Avenue of the Americas, the former Time & Life Building, is located between 50th and 51st streets. The 587-foot-tall (179 m) building was opened in 1959; it is owned by the Rockefeller Group.

== Other architectural elements ==
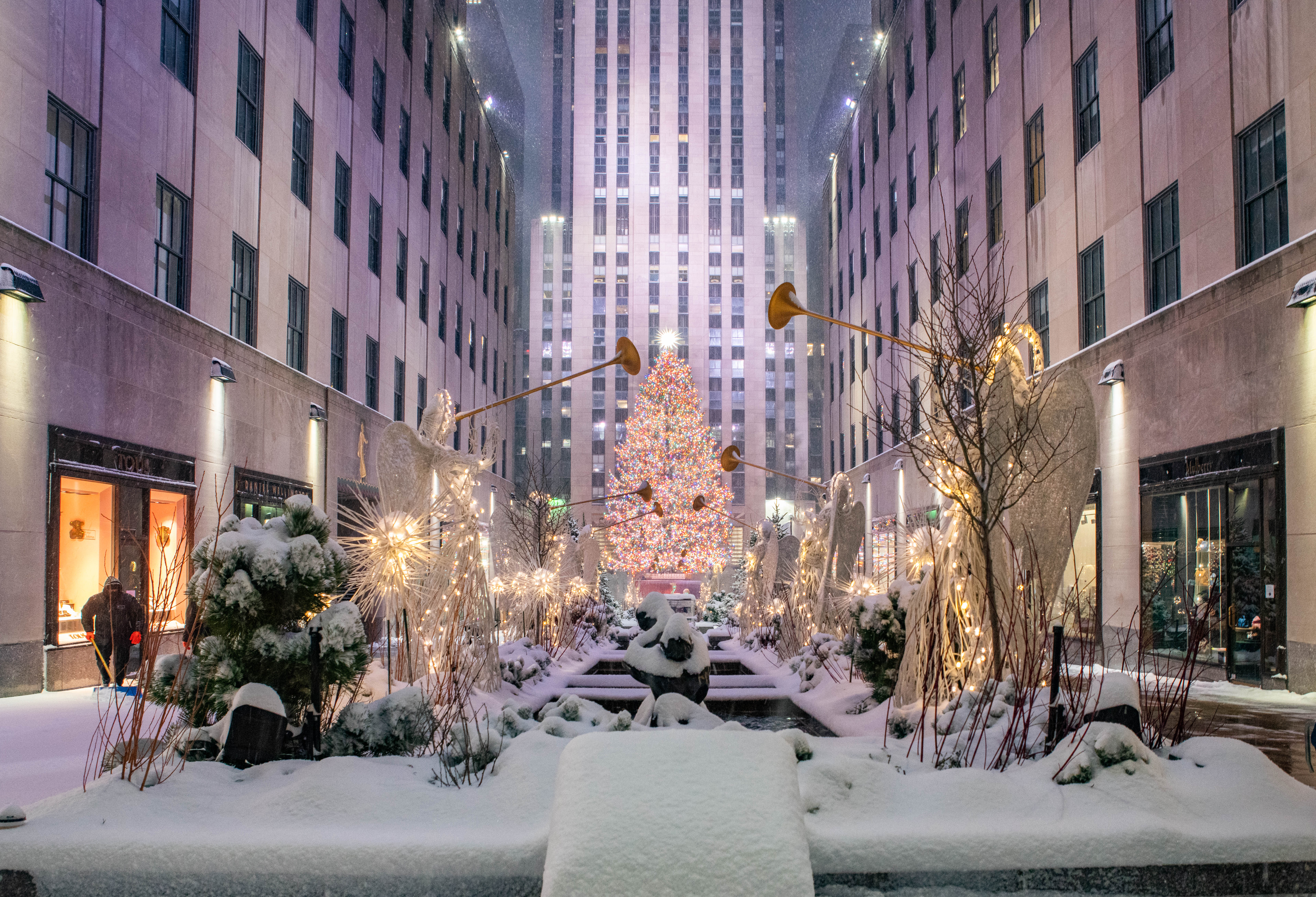
The Rockefeller Center Christmas Tree is placed annually in Rockefeller Center at the end of November.

=== Lower Plaza ===
At the front of 30 Rock is the Lower Plaza, located in the very center of the complex and below ground level. The center plaza was part of the plans for the canceled Metropolitan Opera House. Although the opera house was canceled in 1929, the plaza was retained in subsequent plans. Originally, the plaza would have been located at ground level with a promenade called Channel Gardens, which led westward from Fifth Avenue to the plaza. In the March 1931 revision to the complex's blueprint, the center plaza was enhanced and sunken. The sunken plaza was originally supposed to be oval-shaped, but the plaza was later changed to a rectangular shape. The sunken rectangular plaza, planted with shrubs, provided a sense of privacy and enclosure when it was originally built.

The plaza's main entrance is through the Channel Gardens, a 60-foot-wide (18 m), 200-foot-long (61 m) planted pedestrian esplanade running westward from Fifth Avenue between the British Empire Building and La Maison Francaise. The steeply sloping promenade was originally furnished with six narrow pools in the center of the space, each surrounded by hedges. The pools are topped with fountain heads designed by Rene Chambellan, each representing a different attribute: leadership, will, thought, imagination, energy, and alertness. Chambellan also designed the fountains' drain covers with various bronze depictions of sea creatures such as turtles and crabs. During the winter, the Channel Gardens' fountains were shut off and decorated with Valerie Clarebout's sculptures of angels. The twelve sculptures, each measuring 8 feet (2.4 m) tall, have been placed in the gardens every winter since 1954. At the western end of the promenade is a plaque commemorating the original Elgin Gardens, as well as a bronze monumental plaque to John D. Rockefeller Jr (see below). From there, a flight of the steps descends toward the rink, then splits into two different stairs heading both north and south.

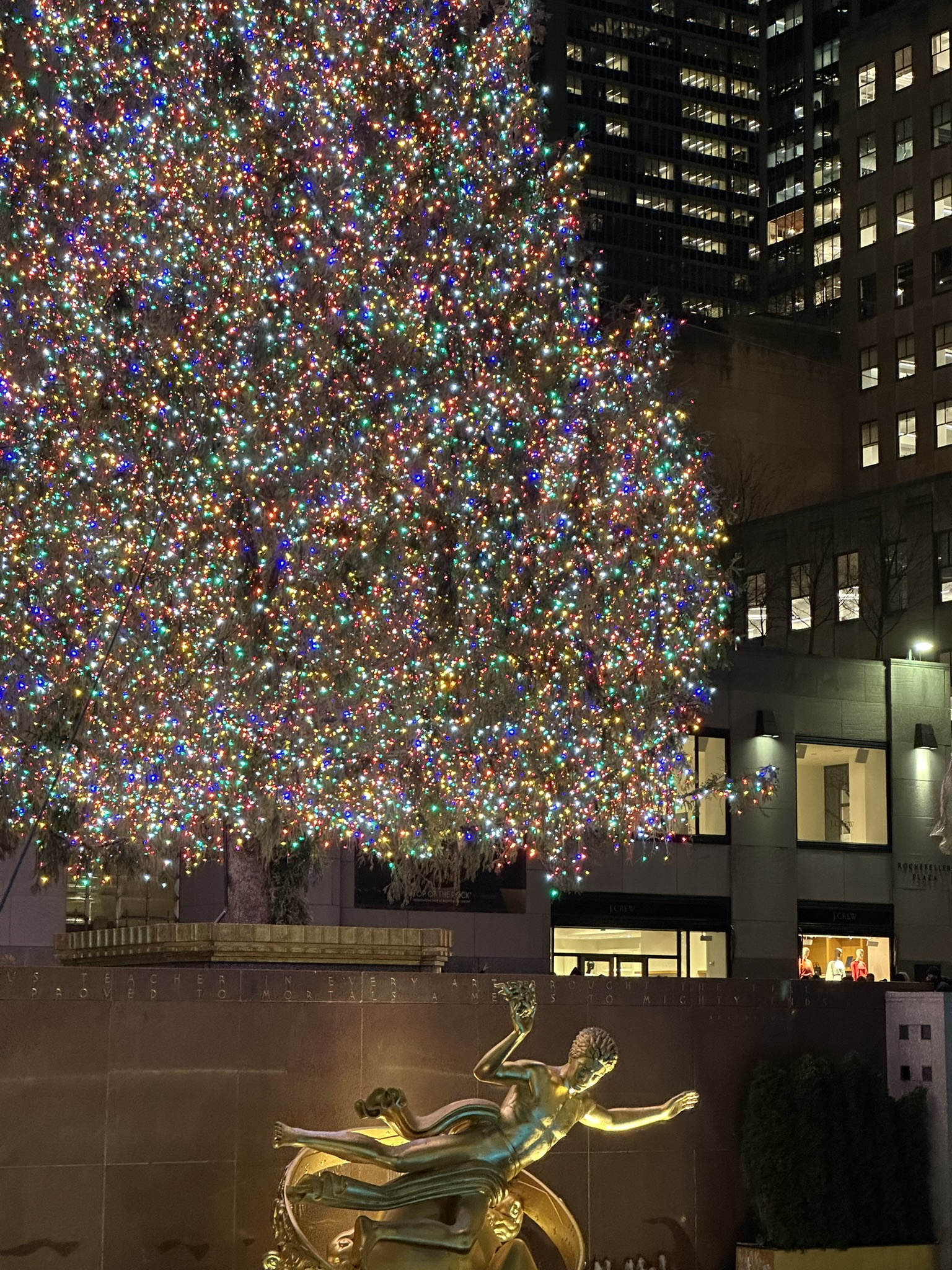
Statue of Prometheus at the rink at Rockefeller Center

The western end of the plaza contains Paul Manship's 1934 masterwork, Prometheus. The statue stands in a 60-by-16-foot (18.3 by 4.9 m) fountain basin in front of a grey rectangular wall. The Rockefeller Center Christmas Tree is placed above the statue from November to January every year; it is usually put in place and lit the week after Thanksgiving, and taken down the week after New Year's Day. The first tree was erected in 1934, and as successive trees received more lavish decorations, the tradition gradually became known worldwide.

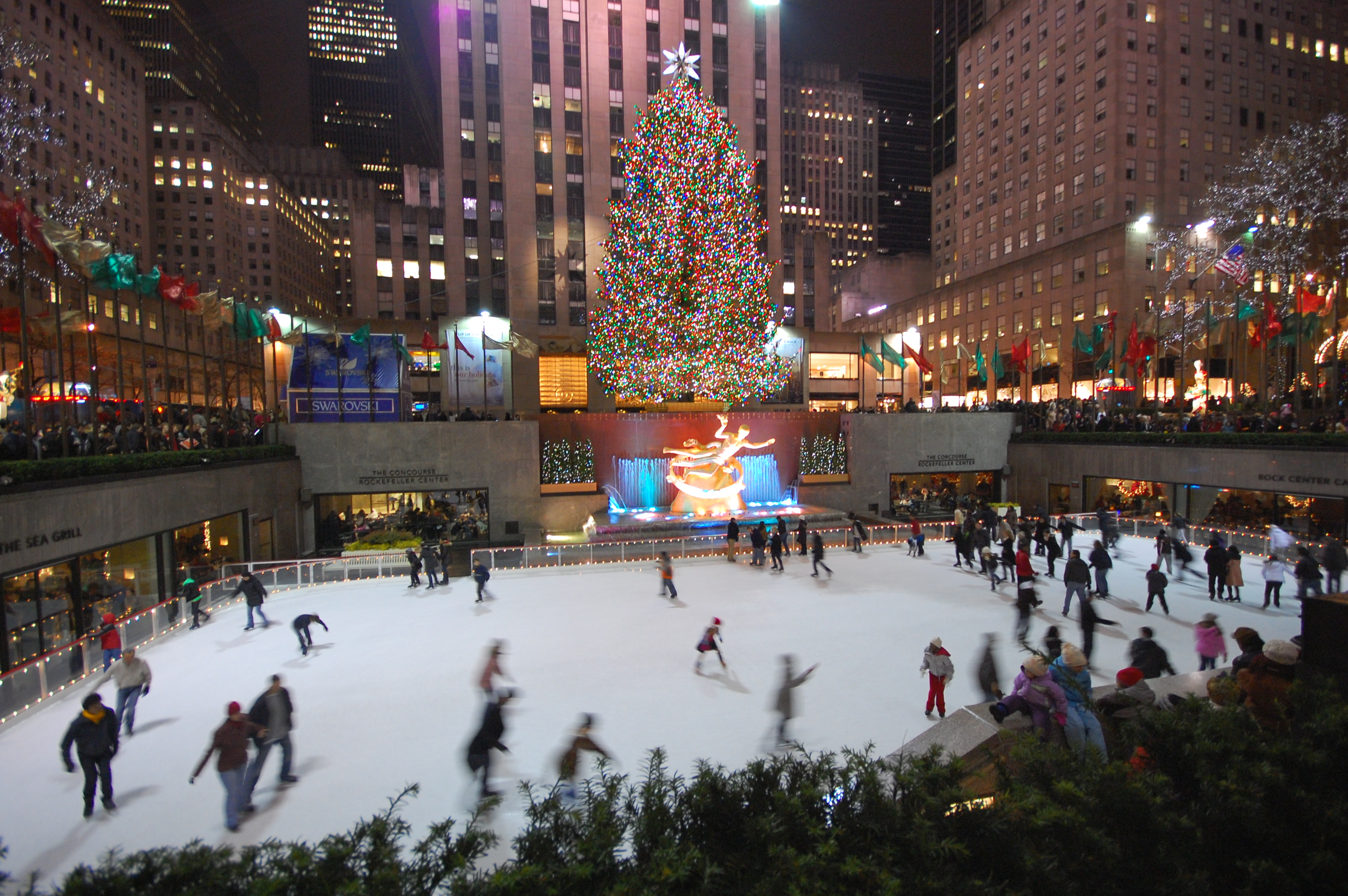
The ice rink and Christmas tree

Much of the plaza's outdoor section is occupied by an ice rink. Installed in 1936, it replaced unprofitable retail space that had been constructed as part of the original center. Originally intended as a "temporary" measure, the rink became an immediate tourist attraction upon opening, becoming one of the world's most famous skating rinks in later years. In 1939, a permanent 120-by-60-foot (37 by 18 m) rink was installed, which necessitated the replacement of the center staircase from Channel Gardens. Its popularity inspired the construction of a skating rink in the former Center Theatre, and for a short time, there were also proposals to convert the lower plaza's ice rink to a roller skating rink during the springtime.

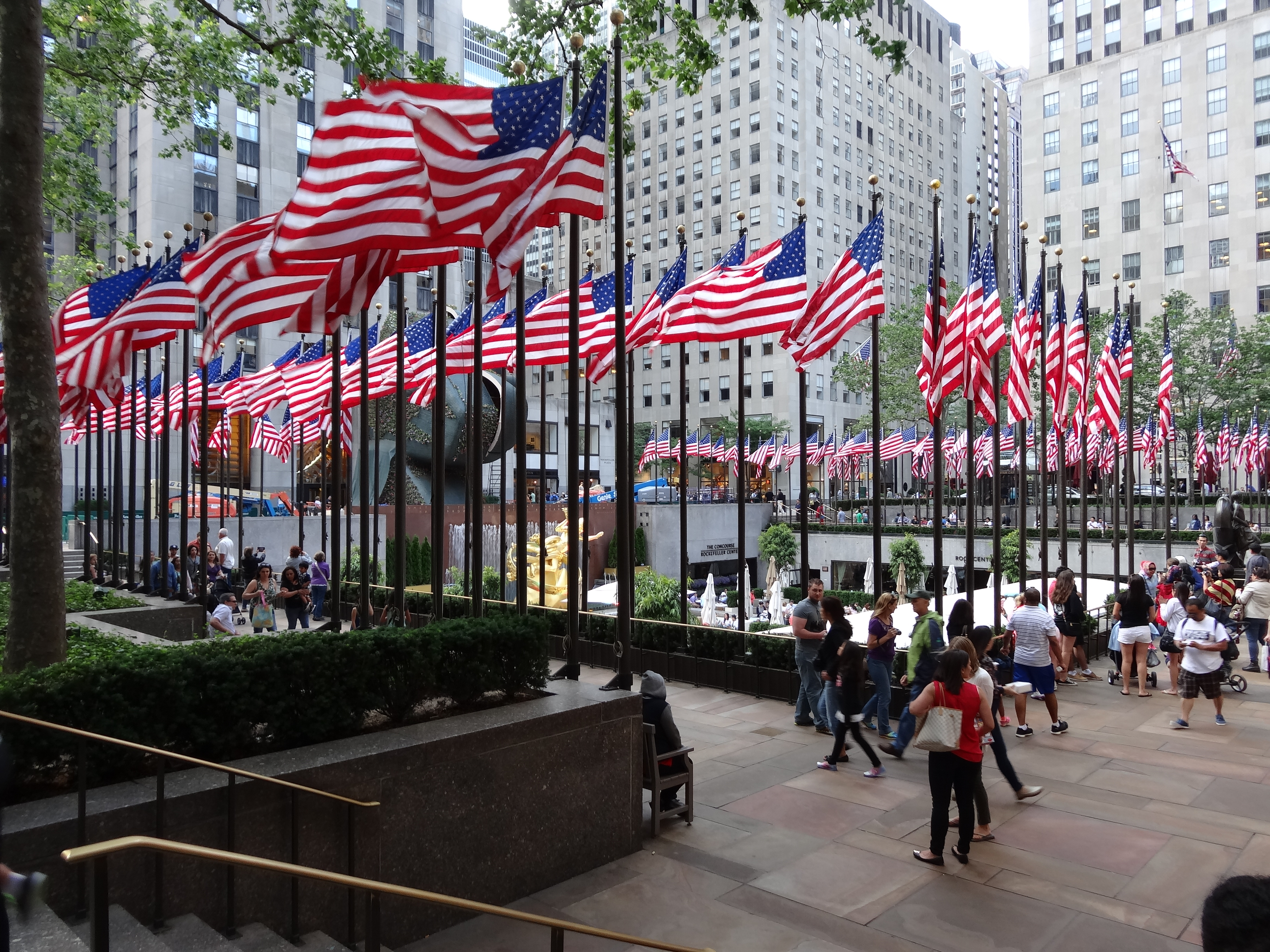
Flagpoles at the Lower Plaza

The northern, southern, and eastern sides of the plaza are surrounded by a walkway that is several steps below street level, with staircases at either western end as well as at the plaza's Channel Gardens entrance. Some 200 flagpoles surround the plaza's perimeter at ground level, installed at regular intervals along the walkway and Rockefeller Plaza. The poles were installed in 1942 and were originally intended to be temporary. The flags later became permanent installations, fitting in with the nearby International Complex. The poles originally displayed the flags of the United Nations' member countries, although in later years they also carried flags of the U.S. states and territories, or decorative and seasonal motifs. Originally, there were 26 flags for each of the members of the United Nations, but as more countries became UN members, additional rows of poles were added on the north and south sides of the plaza. During national and state holidays, every pole carries the flag of the United States. The flags' ropes are secured with locks to prevent people from tampering with the flags.

In July 1962, two years after John Rockefeller Jr.'s death, the center's management placed a plaque at the plaza, containing a list of ten principles in which he believed. The creed was first expressed in 1941. Rockefeller's beliefs include "the supreme worth of the individual and in his right to life, liberty, and the pursuit of happiness" (the first principle) and "truth and justice are fundamental to an enduring social order" (the sixth principle).

The architect I. M. Pei praised Rockefeller Center's lower plaza as being "perhaps the most successful open space in the United States, perhaps in the world", due to its success in drawing visitors. The plaza has also inspired similar developments around the world.

=== Rockefeller Plaza ===
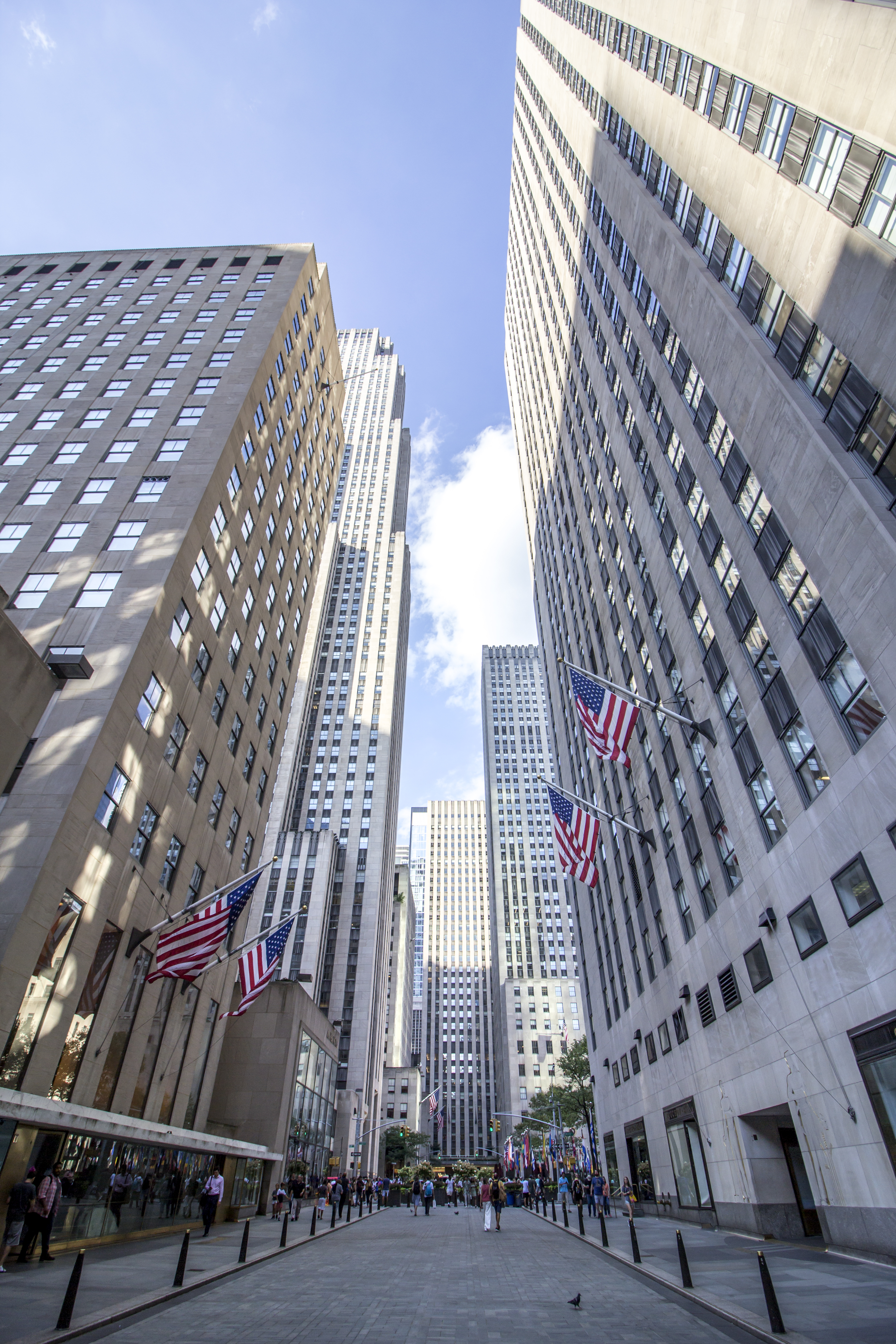
Rockefeller Plaza

Rockefeller Plaza is a pedestrian street that runs through the complex, parallel to Fifth and Sixth avenues. This street was part of the original plans for the Metropolitan Opera, and Benjamin Morris originally intended for the road to stretch from 42nd to 59th streets. Only the 720-foot (220 m) section between 48th and 51st streets was built, and the road was open in its entirety by 1937. The road was given the name "Rockefeller Plaza" in 1933, despite the potential confusion with the Lower Plaza, because it was believed that the "Plaza" in the road's name would emphasize its "spatial unity" with the Lower Plaza and Channel Gardens. The original intention of the street's construction was to enhance the shopping district of Fifth Avenue, to its east, but this never happened, and Rockefeller Plaza now primarily serves as a pedestrian passage that connects all of Rockefeller Center's separate components.

As with most numbered crosstown streets in Manhattan, Rockefeller Plaza is 30 feet (9.1 m) wide with curbs on either side of an asphalt surface. However, the sidewalks are much wider than on typical streets. In addition, Rockefeller Plaza is supported by a multi-level steel skeleton underneath, which houses the underground mall, storage rooms, and the complex's shipping and loading center. As such, it contains a 14.5 inches (37 cm) layer of waterproofing. The surface of Rockefeller Plaza outside Radio City Music Hall, between 50th and 51st Street, contains small bronze circles for theatergoers to stand on while waiting to enter the hall. Until the 1980s, the plaza contained plaques that affirmed Columbia University's ownership of Rockefeller Center, but these were removed with the 1985 sale of the complex to the Rockefeller Group. Since Rockefeller Plaza is technically a purely private property to which the public is welcome, the plaza is closed for part of one day every year.

=== Rooftop gardens ===
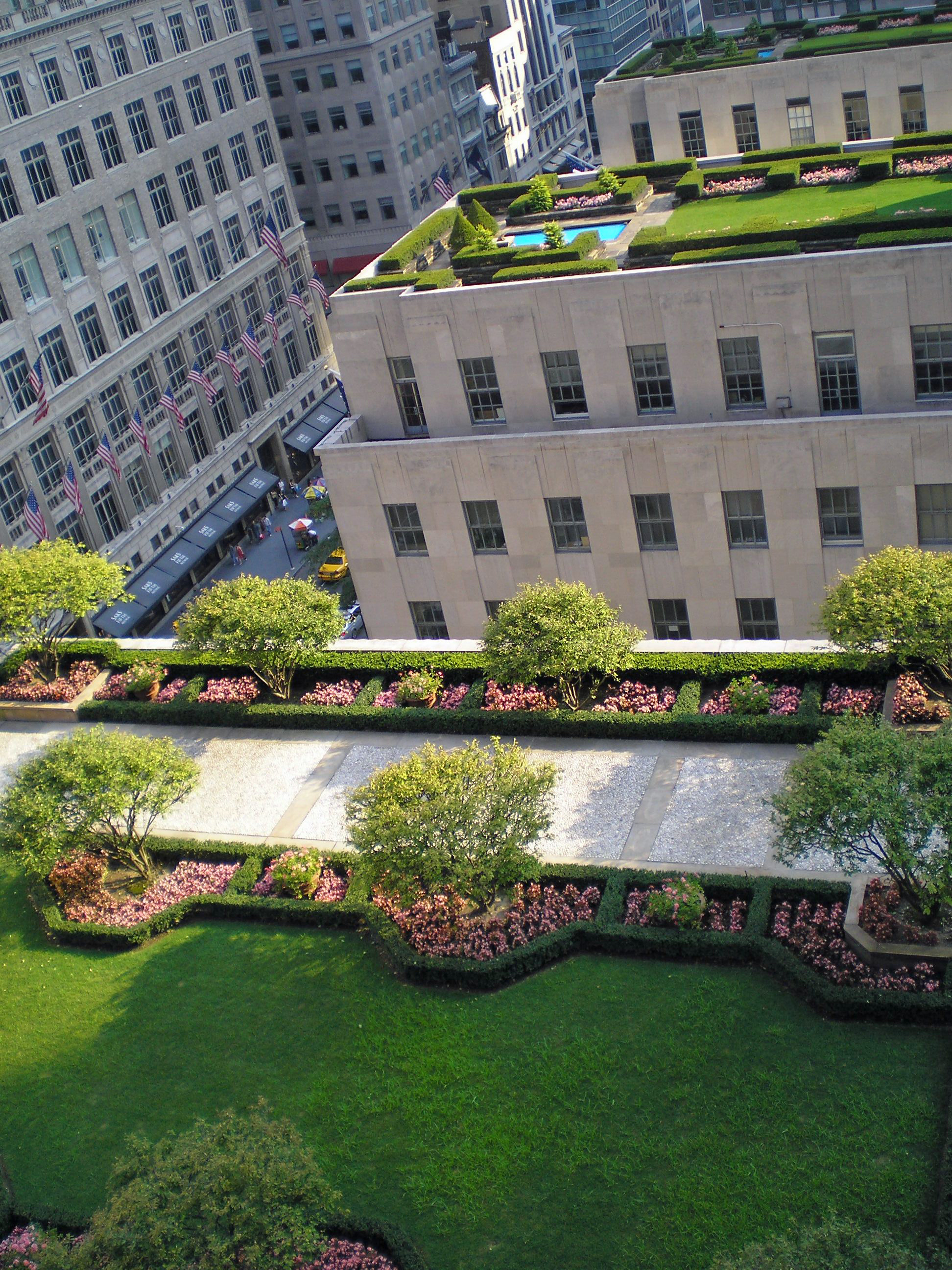
Gardens on the roofs of Rockefeller Center's International Complex, as viewed from the International Building

The gardens atop Rockefeller Center's roofs were designed by Ralph Hancock and Raymond Hood. They came about because both Hood and Todd believed that rooftop gardens would enhance the complex's beauty; in particular, Hood compared the presence of rooftop gardens to the plants around a house. Originally, the gardens were supposed to be all interconnected via bridges between the roofs of each building. However, after Hood's death in 1935, the garden plan fell apart, as most of the complex's final buildings were built without provisions for gardens. The Associated Press Building's 15th-story roof, as well as the isolated location of the International Building and the high cost of these gardens, made this system infeasible. Ultimately, gardens were installed on 10 Rockefeller Plaza; 30 Rockefeller Plaza; the four International-themed retail buildings; the Center Theatre; and Radio City Music Hall. The gardens started running a $45,000-per-year deficit by 1937 due to various expenses as well as a lack of interest among tourists.

The largest and most grand of the gardens was the 0.75-acre (0.30 ha) "Garden of the Nations" (alternatively "Gardens of the Nations"), which was installed on the eleventh-floor roof of 30 Rockefeller Plaza and opened in April 1935. The construction effort involved 3,000 short tons (2,700 long tons) of soil; 100 short tons (89 long tons) of rock from as far as England; 100,000 bricks; 2,000 trees and shrubs; 4,000 small plants; and 20,000 bulbs for flowers. They were originally composed of thirteen nation-specific gardens whose layouts were inspired by the gardens in the respective countries they represented. Each of the nation-themed gardens were separated by barriers. There was an "International Garden", a rock garden, in the center of the thirteen nation-themed gardens, which featured a meandering stream and 2,000 plant varieties. The Garden of the Nations also contained a children's garden, a modern-style garden, and a shrub-and-vegetable patch. Upon opening, the Garden of the Nations attracted many visitors because of its collection of exotic flora, and it became the most popular garden in Rockefeller Center. In its heyday, the Center charged admission fees for the Garden of the Nations. However, all of the nation-themed gardens were eventually removed, and the rock garden was left to dry up, supplanted by flower beds that were no longer open to the public.

The International complex's gardens fared better. Hancock developed the British Empire Building and La Maison Francaise's gardens, while A.M. van den Hoek designed the gardens atop the other two buildings. The British and French gardens both contain a lawn and pool surrounded by hedges, while the other two gardens atop the International Building's wings include ivy lawns surrounded by hedges. The Italian garden also contained a cobblestone walkway and two plaques from the Roman Forum, while International Building North's garden has a paved walkway with steps. The roof gardens of the International Building's wings were restored in 1986 for $48,000 each, followed by the gardens on the British and French buildings, which were restored the next year.

In 2021, Tishman Speyer submitted proposals for a 24,000-square-foot (2,200 m^{2}) rooftop terrace on Radio City Music Hall, as well as a pedestrian bridge to 50 Rockefeller Plaza. These plans dated from an original proposal for the theater that was never carried out. The garden opened in September 2021 and is formally known as Radio Park. Designed by the firm of HMWhite, the slightly sloped garden includes birch trees, a set of bleachers, and various pathways.

=== Underground concourse ===
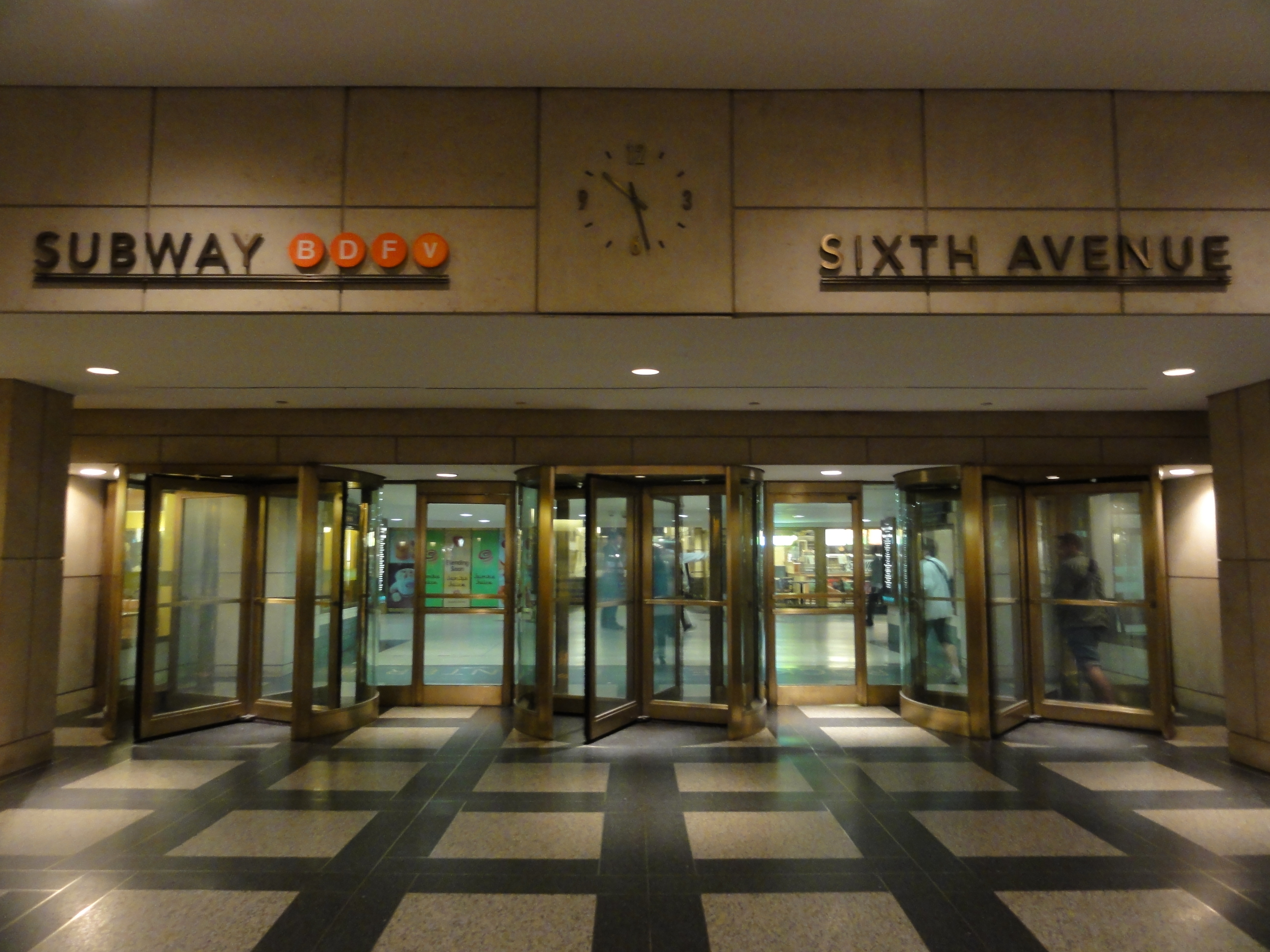
Exit from the concourse to the subway station

A series of shop-and-restaurant-filled pedestrian passages stretch underground from 47th to 51st streets between Fifth and Seventh avenues. The pedestrian tunnel system was part of the updated 1931 plan for the center, and formal proposals for the system were submitted in 1933. It was supposed to comprise a system that stretched over 0.75 miles (1.21 km), all air-conditioned and lined with shops. Meanwhile, the pair of four-lane roadways was supposed to be located underneath the pedestrian mall, with delivery ramps leading to a 320-by-180-foot (98 by 55 m) central loading area 34 feet (10 m) below ground. Later plans also included a people mover.

Ultimately, the people mover was not built, but the 25-space mall opened in May 1935. The complex's owner Tishman Speyer renovated the concourse in 1999 in an effort to make the underground retail space more noticeable and attract more upscale tenants. The original bronze ornaments and lighting were replaced, air-conditioning was installed, two passageways were demolished, and both ground-level and underground retail spaces were refurbished as part of the renovation.

The concourse is the uppermost level of the complex's four basement levels, as well as the only basement level open to the public. The lower three levels are home to storage rooms and the complex's shipping center, the latter of which is accessed by a delivery ramp at 50th Street. Access is via lobby stairways in the six landmark buildings, through restaurants surrounding the concourse-level skating rink, and via elevators to the north and south of the rink. There is also a connection to the New York City Subway's 47th–50th Streets–Rockefeller Center station, serving the B, D, F, <F>, and M trains. As of 2018, the largest retailer in the concourse is Banana Republic. Within the concourse also lies a disconnected payphone that as of April 2025 was the last payphone of Rockefeller Center, which once had dozens.

=== Pre-existing buildings ===
Two small buildings abut the north and south corners of the 30 Rockefeller Plaza annex. These buildings exist as a result of two tenants who refused to sell their rights to Rockefeller during construction. The grocer John F. Maxwell would only sell his property at Sixth Avenue and 50th Street if he received $1 million in return. However, Rockefeller's assistant Charles O. Heydt mistakenly said that Maxwell would never sell, and Maxwell himself said that he had never been approached by the Rockefellers. Consequently, Rockefeller Center did not purchase Maxwell's property until 1970. Maxwell's demand paled to that of Daniel Hurley and Patrick Daly, owners of a speakeasy who, since 1892, had leased a property at 49th Street. They would sell for $250 million, roughly the cost of the entire complex. They initially gained a lease extension until 1942, but ended up leasing their property until 1975, and was built around Maxwell's and Hurley and Daly's properties.

On the southeast corner of the complex, on Fifth Avenue between 48th and 49th streets, there were also two pre-existing buildings. Robert Walton Goelet owned a lot at 2–6 West 49th Street and wished to develop it; the lot was developed as 608 Fifth Avenue, which was completed in 1932. St. Nicholas Church, located on 48th Street behind Goelet's land, also refused to sell the property despite an offer of up to $7 million for the property. The church was razed in 1949 to make way for 600 Fifth Avenue.

== Art ==
News by Isamu Noguchi

In November 1931, John Todd suggested the creation of a program for placing distinctive artworks within each of the buildings. Hartley Burr Alexander, a noted mythology and symbology professor, was tasked with planning the complex's arts installations. Alexander submitted his plan for the site's artwork in December 1932. As part of the proposal, the complex would have a variety of sculptures, statues, murals, friezes, decorative fountains, and mosaics. In an expansion of Hood's setback-garden plan, Alexander's proposal also included rooftop gardens atop all the buildings, which would create a "Babylonian garden" when viewed from above.

At first, Alexander suggested "Homo Fabor, Man the Builder" as the complex's overarching theme, representing satisfaction with one's occupation rather than with the wage. However, that theme was not particularly well received by the architects, so Alexander proposed another theme, the "New Frontiers"; this theme dealt with social and scientific innovations and represented the challenges that humanity faced "after the conquest of the physical world". In theory, this was considered a fitting theme, but Alexander had been so specific about the details of the necessary artworks that it limited the creative license for any artists who would be commissioned for such works, so he was fired. It took several tries to agree on the current theme, "The March of Civilization", at which point some of the art had already been commissioned, including those which Alexander had proposed.

The art that currently exists within Rockefeller Center was inspired by Professor Alexander's arts program. Sculptor Lee Lawrie contributed the largest number of individual pieces – twelve, including the Atlas statue facing Fifth Avenue and the conspicuous friezes of Wisdom above the main entrance to 30 Rockefeller Plaza. Edward Trumbull coordinated the colors of the works located inside the buildings, and Léon-Victor Solon did the same job for the exterior pieces. Isamu Noguchi's gleaming stainless steel bas-relief, News, over the main entrance to 50 Rockefeller Plaza (the Associated Press Building) was, at the time of commissioning, the largest metal bas-relief in the world. The complex's other sculptors included Rene Chambellan, Leo Friedlander, Robert Garrison, Alfred Janniot, Carl Paul Jennewein, Gaston Lachaise, Leo Lentelli, Paul Manship, Giacomo Manzù, Hildreth Meiere, and Attilio Piccirilli. Other artists included Carl Milles, Margaret Bourke-White (NBC photomural), and Dean Cornwell, who executed the mural The History of Transportation in the lobby of the Eastern Airlines building (today 10 Rockefeller Plaza). Radio City Music Hall architect Donald Deskey commissioned many Depression-era artists to design works for the interior of the hall, including Stuart Davis's 1932 mural Men Without Women, named after the short story collection by Ernest Hemingway that had been published the same year. One of the center's more controversial works was Man at the Crossroads, created by Diego Rivera, which was originally commissioned for 30 Rockefeller Plaza's lobby but was demolished before it could be completed.

=== Statues ===
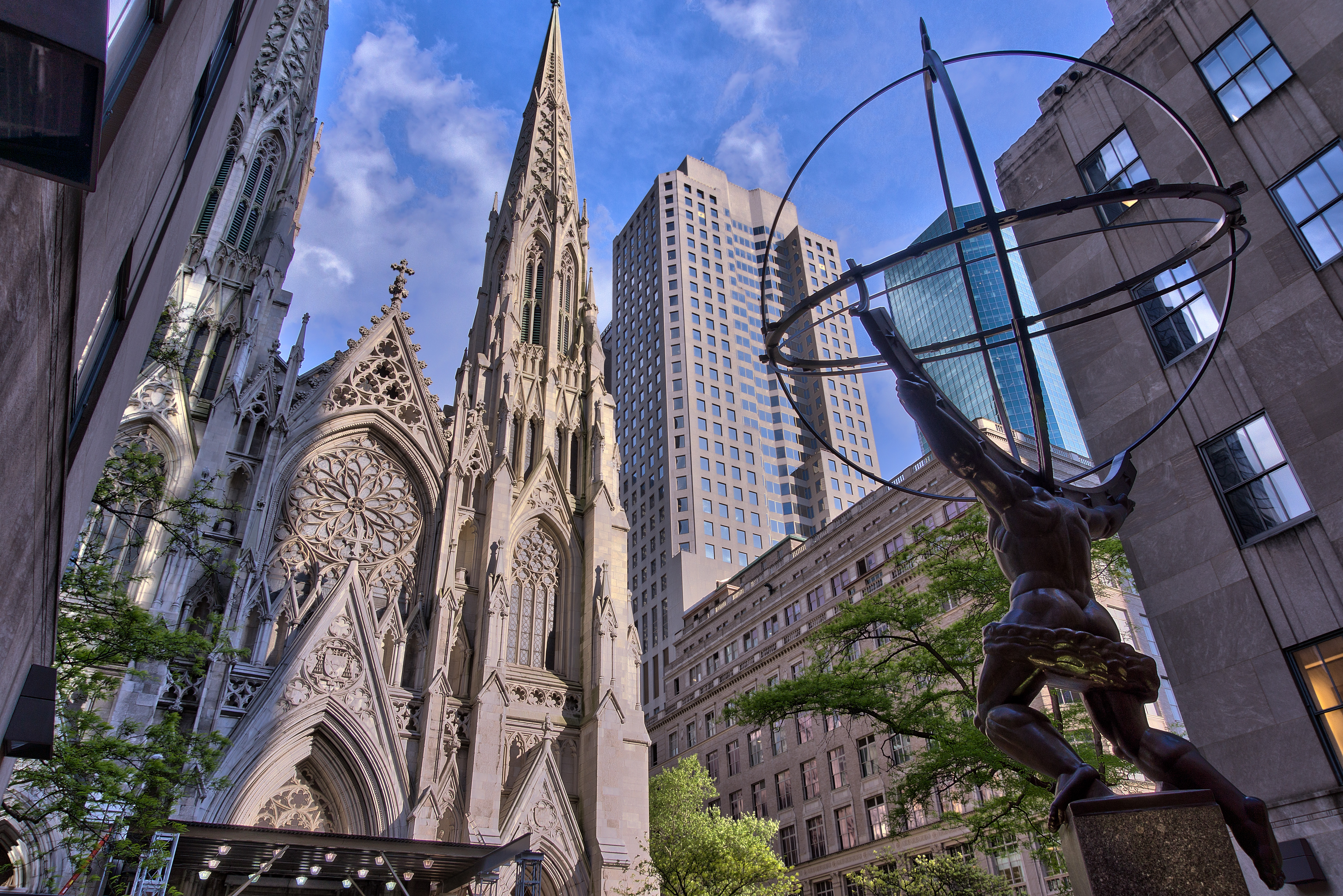
Atlas (1936) faces St. Patrick's Cathedral.

==== Atlas ====
Commissioned in 1936 and executed by Lee Lawrie and Rene Chambellan, the Atlas statue is located in the International Building's courtyard. It faces eastward toward St. Patrick's Cathedral on Fifth Avenue. The statue depicts Atlas the titan, with exaggerated muscles, supporting the celestial vault on his shoulders.

==== Prometheus ====
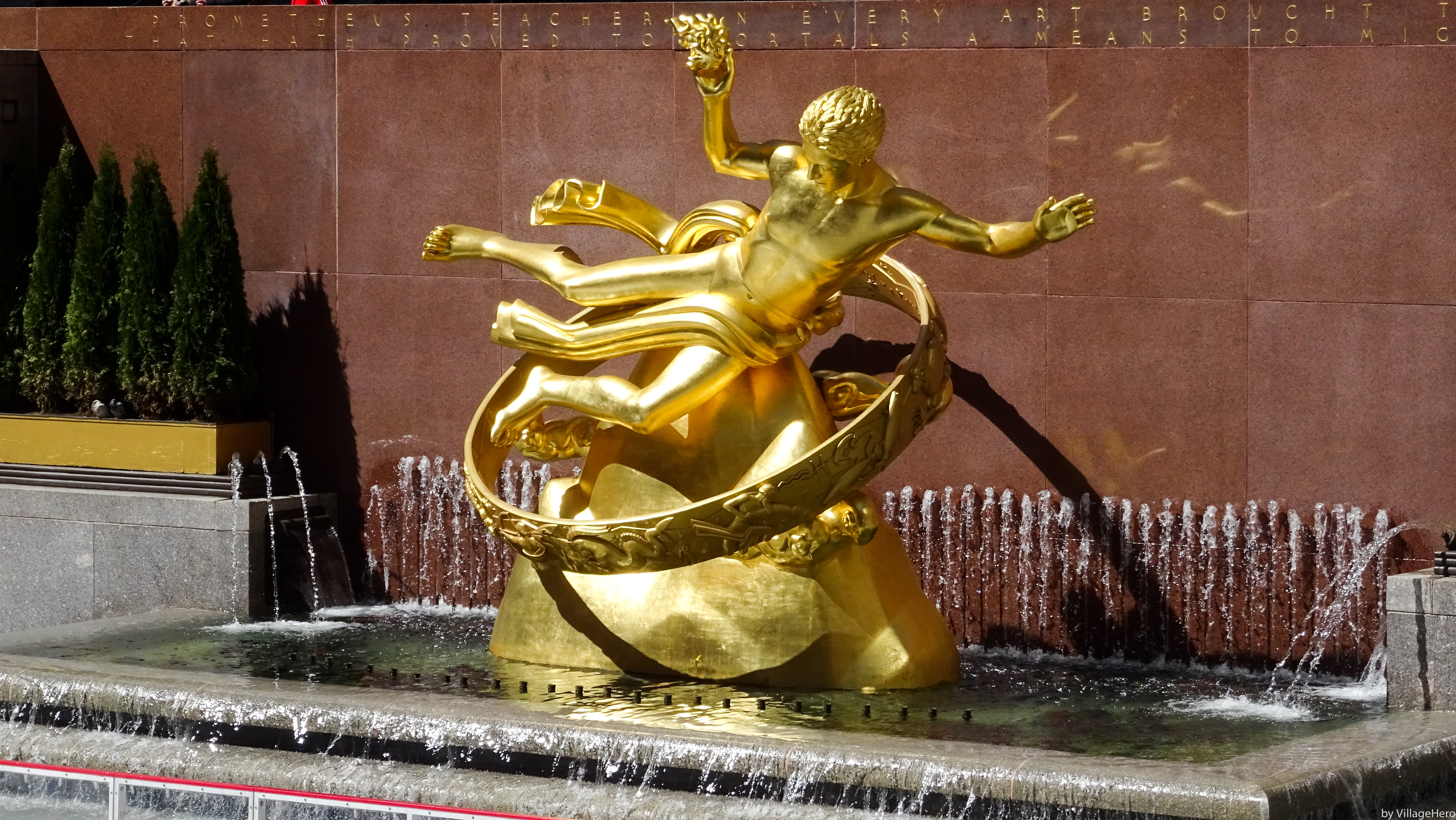
Prometheus (1934)

Paul Manship's highly recognizable bronze gilded Prometheus statue, commissioned in 1934, is located at the western end of the sunken plaza. It stands 18 feet (5.5 m) high and weighs 8 short tons (7.1 long tons). The statue depicts the Greek legend of the Titan Prometheus recumbent, bringing fire to mankind. The statue is flanked by two smaller gilded representations of Youth and Maiden, which were relocated to Palazzo d'Italia from 1939 to 1984 because Manship thought the representations did not fit visually. The model for Prometheus was Leonardo (Leon) Nole, and the inscription, a paraphrase from Aeschylus, on the granite wall behind, reads: "Prometheus, teacher in every art, brought the fire that hath proved to mortals a means to mighty ends."

=== Man at the Crossroads ===
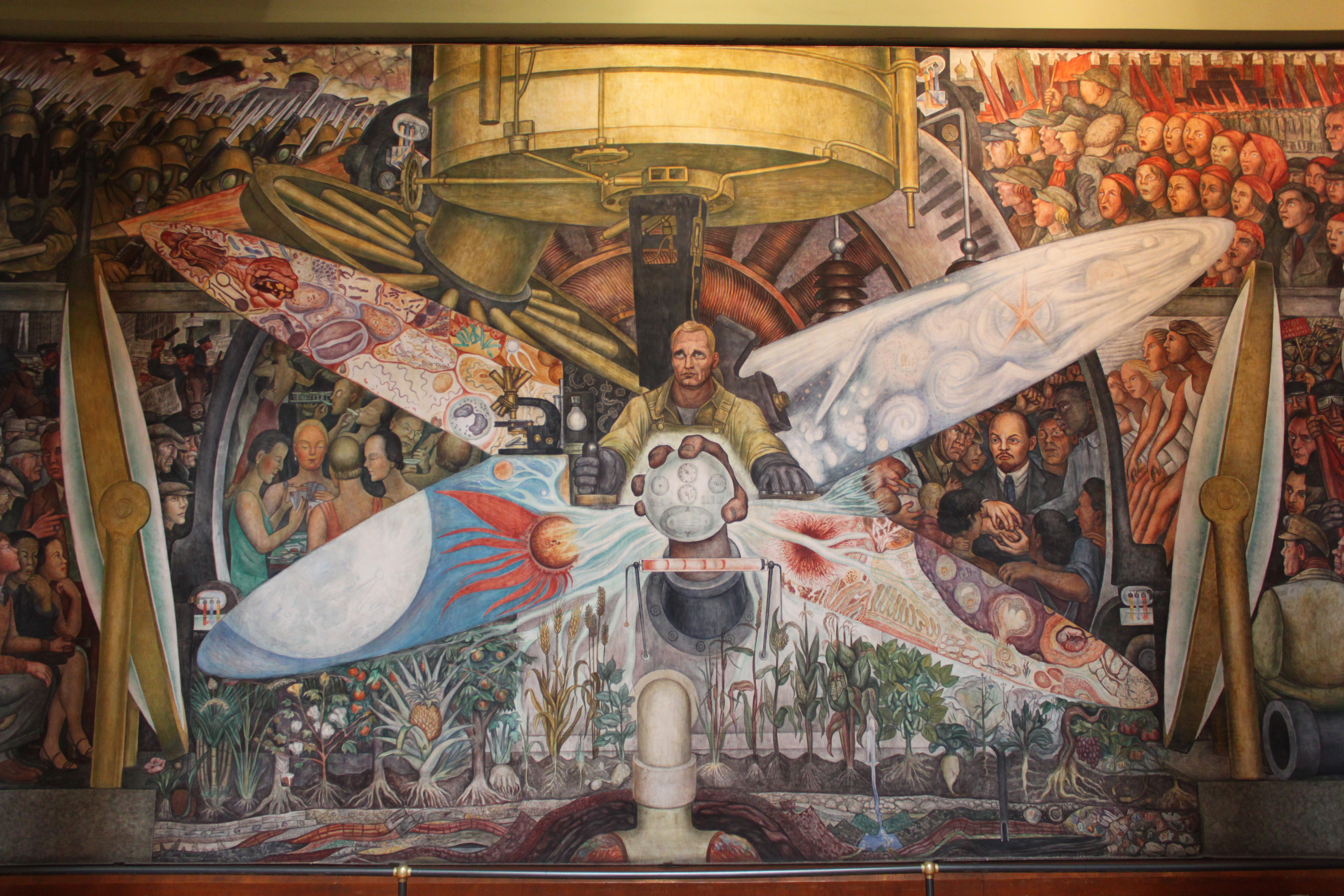
Man, Controller of the Universe, a recreation of the destroyed Man at the Crossroads mural in 30 Rockefeller Plaza's lobby

In 1932, the Mexican socialist artist Diego Rivera (whose sponsor was the Museum of Modern Art and whose patron at the time was Abby Aldrich Rockefeller, the wife of John D. Rockefeller, Jr.), was commissioned by their son Nelson to create a color fresco for the 1,071-square-foot (99 m^{2}) wall in the lobby of the then-RCA Building. This came after Nelson had been unable to secure the commissioning of either Matisse or Picasso. Previously Rivera had painted a controversial fresco in Detroit titled Detroit Industry, commissioned by Abby and John's friend, Edsel Ford, who later became a trustee of the Museum of Modern Art.

As expected, his Man at the Crossroads became controversial, as it contained Moscow May Day scenes and a clear portrait of Lenin, which had not been apparent in initial sketches. After Nelson issued a written warning to Rivera to replace the offending figure with an anonymous face, Rivera refused (after offering to counterbalance Lenin with a portrait of Lincoln). As per Nelson's orders, Rivera was paid for his commission and the mural was papered over. Nine months later, after all attempts to save the fresco were explored—including relocating it to Abby's Museum of Modern Art—it was destroyed as a last option. (Rivera would later partially recreate the work as Man, Controller of the Universe, using photographs taken by an assistant, Lucienne Bloch.) Rivera's fresco in the center was replaced with a larger mural by the Catalan artist Josep Maria Sert, titled American Progress, depicting a vast allegorical scene of men constructing modern America. Containing figures of Abraham Lincoln, Mahatma Gandhi, and Ralph Waldo Emerson, it wraps around the west wall of 30 Rockefeller Plaza's Grand Lobby.

== Reception ==
=== Contemporary commentary ===
In its earliest years, Rockefeller Center received largely negative and pessimistic reviews from architectural critics. The most cynical opinion came from architectural scholar Lewis Mumford, who so hated the "weakly conceived, reckless, romantic chaos" of the March 1931 plans for Rockefeller Center that he reportedly went into exile in upstate New York. He blamed John Rockefeller Jr. for the complex's "inability to consider a new type of problem in any form except the skyscraper stereotype". Mumford's view of the complex was only marginally less negative when he revisited the issue in December 1933: he said that it could be "large, exciting, [and] romantic" at night, but that "a mountain or ash heap of the same size would do the trick almost as well, if the lights were cleverly arranged". Ralph Adams Cram, who adhered to a more classical architectural style, also had a pessimistic view of the plans unveiled in March 1931. He called the plan for Rockefeller Center "an apotheosis of megalomania, a defiant egotism" arising from an ostentatious display of wealth, and said that "the sooner we accomplish the destiny it so perfectly foreshadows, the sooner we shall be able to clear the ground and begin again". Douglas Haskell, who formerly edited Architectural Forum magazine, wrote that Rockefeller Center's ambiance was "gray, unreal, baleful".

The urban planner Le Corbusier had a more optimistic view of the complex, expressing that Rockefeller Center was "rational, logically conceived, biologically normal, [and] harmonious". He wrote that although Rockefeller Center would inevitably be disorganized in its earliest years, it would eventually adhere to a certain "order", and he also praised the complex for being a paragon of "noble" and "efficient" construction. The writer Frederick Lewis Allen took a more moderate viewpoint, saying that negative critics had "hoped for too much" precisely because Rockefeller Center had been planned during an economically prosperous time, but was constructed during the Depression. Even though Allen thought that the art was mediocre and the opportunities for a less lively complex were wasted, he stated that Rockefeller Center had an aura of "festivity" around it, unlike most other office buildings in America. Sigfried Giedion wrote in his book Space, Time and Architecture that Rockefeller Center's design was akin to a "civic center" whose design represented the 1930s version of the future. Henry Luce, the founder of Time Inc., said in 1941 that Rockefeller Center represented "the true world of tomorrow", as opposed to the 1939 New York World's Fair, whose "World of Tomorrow" representations "are today junk piles under the winter snow". Novelist Gertrude Stein said in 1935, "The view of Rockefeller Center from Fifth Avenue is the most beautiful thing I have ever seen."

=== Retrospective commentary and impact ===
By the 1940s, most critics had positive views of Rockefeller Center. Even Mumford praised the complex, lamenting in 1947 that the new headquarters of the United Nations on First Avenue had no "human scale" or "transition from the intimate to the monumental", whereas Rockefeller Center's buildings "produce an aesthetic effect out of all proportion to their size". Haskell wrote in 1966 that Rockefeller Center's designers "seemed to have regarded urban life as an enhanceable romance". In 1969, the art historian Vincent Scully wrote, "Rockefeller Center is one of the few surviving public spaces that look as if they were designed and used by people who knew what stable wealth was and were not ashamed to enjoy it."

The New York State Office of Parks, Recreation and Historic Preservation commissioned a report in 1974 titled "Grand Central Terminal and Rockefeller Center: A Historic-Critical Estimate of Their Significance", in which they concluded that Rockefeller Center, along with Central Park and Grand Central Terminal, were the only three developments that could slow down Manhattan's "remorseless process of expansion and decay". In 1976, New York Times architectural critic Paul Goldberger wrote, "What makes Rockefeller Center work is that it is at once a formal Beaux‐Arts‐influenced complex of dignified towers and a lively, utterly contemporary amalgam of shops, plazas and street life. It is as natural a home for a 1970's street festival as for a 1930's movie about cafe society: few designs can join such disparate worlds so comfortably." The American Institute of Architects' 2007 survey List of America's Favorite Architecture ranked the Rockefeller Center complex among the top 150 buildings in the United States.

Several later buildings were inspired by Rockefeller Center and its constituent buildings. 525 William Penn Place in Pittsburgh, also designed by Harrison & Abramovitz, includes limestone piers and steel fins that were inspired by 30 Rockefeller Plaza's design. In the 1960s, David Rockefeller developed the Embarcadero Center in San Francisco, which was nicknamed "Rockefeller Center West". Postmodern skyscrapers based on Rockefeller Center include the NBC Tower in Chicago and the Wells Fargo Center in Minneapolis.

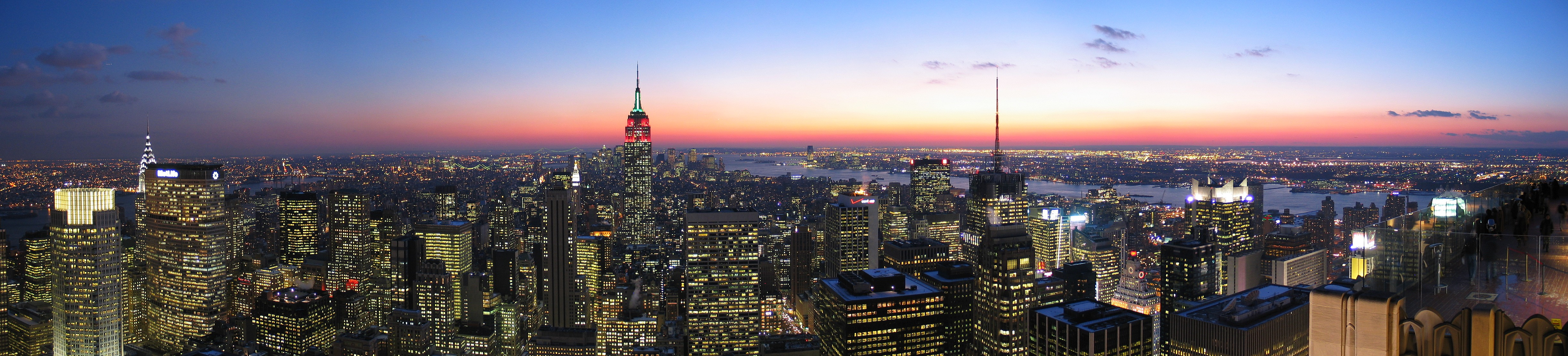
View of New York City looking south from 30 Rockefeller Plaza's observatory, Top of the Rock, in December 2005

== See also ==
- Architecture of New York City
- Early skyscrapers
- List of New York City Designated Landmarks in Manhattan from 14th to 59th Streets
- National Register of Historic Places listings in Manhattan from 14th to 59th Streets
