= Robert Garrison (sculptor) =

American sculptor

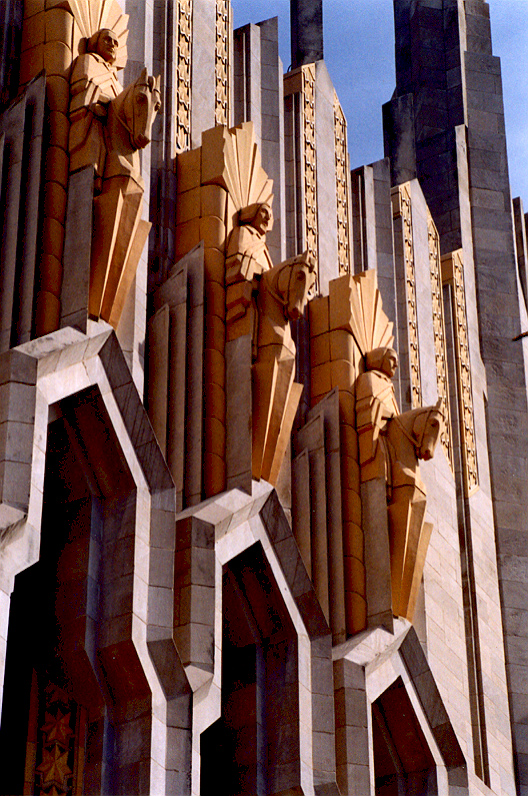
Circuit Riders, Boston Methodist Church, Tulsa, Oklahoma

Robert Ernest Garrison was an American sculptor (May 30, 1895 – 1943). He was born in Fort Dodge, Iowa. Son of Fred A. Garrison and Anna Timms.

Garrison studied at the Pennsylvania Academy of Fine Arts in Philadelphia and with Gutzon Borglum. He made his home in Denver, Colorado where he served on the faculty of the University of Denver and some of his work can be found there.

Garrison worked mainly in stone and bronze. In 1919 he moved to Denver and became a teacher and Director of the Denver Academy of Fine and Applied Arts (which later became the Chappell School and eventually the School of Art of the University of Denver). During his tenure there he taught modeling, drawing and applied design. While in Denver he became acquainted with George William Eggers, the Director of the Denver Art Museum and president of the Municipal Art Commission of Denver.

Garrison received commissions for many of Denver's architectural ornaments in the 1920s, including works for the NRHP-listed Ideal Building, the NRHP-listed Midland Savings Building, the National Jewish Hospital's B'nai B'rith Building, the Park Hill Branch Library, Denver University's football stadium, and South High School.

In 1930 Garrison moved to New York City and began completing several projects there. These included the three sculptural panels for the RKO Building at the Sixth Avenue entrance of Rockefeller Center in New York City. He also completed a heroic figure at West Point, and sculptural details for the Boston Avenue Methodist Church in Tulsa, Oklahoma, a National Historic Landmark.

Additional works include architectural sculptures in the style of medieval grotesques at South High School, Denver and the figures of the four evangelists on the bell tower of the former St. Thomas Seminary, Denver.

The Denver Botanic Gardens has a terracotta frieze depicting, among things, two hunters with shotguns shooting at a buffalo. This frieze originally was part of the Midland Savings Bank but was removed when the bank was renovated in 1964 and moved to the botanical gardens.

His two monumental molded concrete figures of athletes were integral to the University of Denver's Hilltop Stadium (1926), and were demolished along with the stadium in 1971. A public debate ensued about what should be done with Garrison's 27-foot-high sculpted figures that graced the outside walls. The male and female figures were said to be “The spirit and significance of coeducational college athletics.” As the Hilltop Stadium figures were hollow and considered fragile, they were not saved.

Garrison also designed the Civic Center Park's Seal Pool's two fountains, a pair of bronze mountain lions for the entrance of the State Office Building and the gargoyles at Denver's South High School.

Garrison's work was cited by the National Park Service in the National Register of Historic Places registration form for Denver's Civic Center Historic District which was listed on the National Register of Historic Places in 1974 and further designated a National Historic Landmark in 2012.

A veteran of World War I, he served overseas in World War I from 14 July 1918 to 22 March 1919. Garrison also enlisted in World War II. He died in 1943 while teaching camouflage painting.
