= 1271 Avenue of the Americas =

Office skyscraper in Manhattan, New York

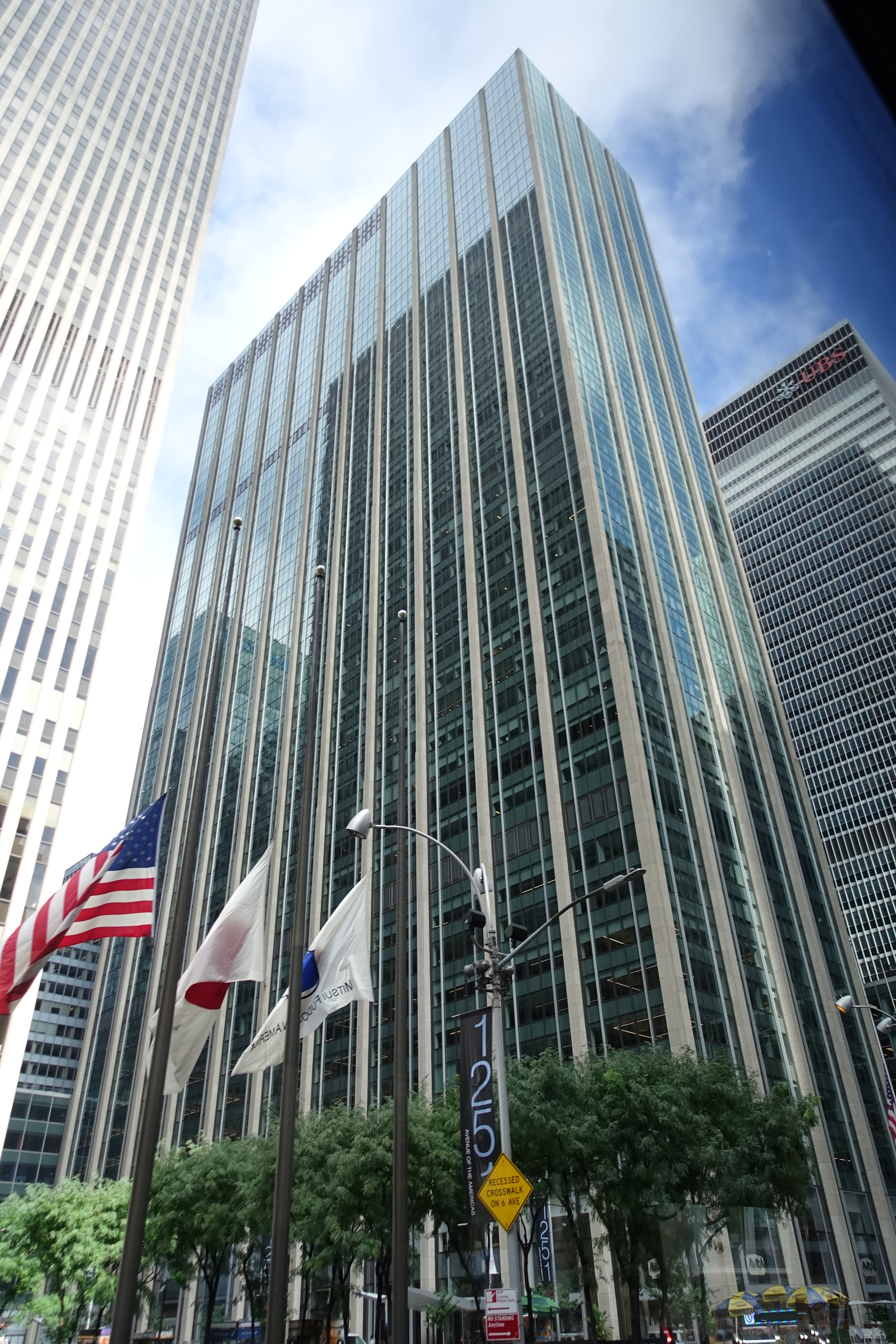
- Former names: Time & Life Building

General information
- Status: Completed
- Type: Office
- Location: Manhattan, New York, U.S.
- Coordinates: 40°45′38″N 73°58′52″W
- Construction started: 1957
- Completed: 1960
- Opening: October 1959
- Cost: $70 million
- Owner: Rockefeller Group (Mitsubishi Group)
- Operator: Rockefeller Group

Height
- Roof: 587 ft (179 m)

Technical details
- Floor count: 48 (Note: Some sources cite 1271 Avenue of the Americas as a 47-story skyscraper with a seven-story base. Architectural Forum cited the building as having 47 stories but its base as having eight stories.)
- Floor area: 1,962,900 ft^{2} (182,360 m^{2})

Design and construction
- Architect: Wallace Harrison of Harrison, Abramovitz, and Harris
- Main contractor: George A. Fuller Company

New York City Landmark
- Designated: July 16, 2002
- Reference no.: 2119
- Designated entity: Ground-floor interior

1271 Avenue of the Americas (formerly known as the Time & Life Building) is a 48-story skyscraper on Sixth Avenue (Avenue of the Americas), between 50th and 51st streets, in the Midtown Manhattan neighborhood of New York City, United States. Designed by architect Wallace Harrison of Harrison, Abramovitz, and Harris, the building was developed between 1956 and 1960 as part of Rockefeller Center.

The building's eight-story base partially wraps around its 48-story main tower. Both sections are surrounded by a plaza, which has white-and-gray pavement in a serpentine pattern, as well as water fountains. The facade consists of glass panels between limestone columns. The lobby contains serpentine floors, white-marble and stainless-steel walls, and reddish-burgundy glass ceilings, in addition to artwork by Josef Albers, Fritz Glarner, and Francis Brennan. The ground floor also includes storefronts and originally housed La Fonda del Sol, a Latin American–themed restaurant. Each of the upper floors covers 28,000 square feet (2,600 m^{2}), with the offices arranged around the core. The 48th floor originally contained the Hemisphere Club, which operated as a members-only restaurant during the day and was open to the public during evenings.

After the media firm Time Inc. expressed its intention to move from 1 Rockefeller Plaza in the 1950s, Rockefeller Center's owners proposed a skyscraper at 1271 Avenue of the Americas to accommodate the move. Construction started in May 1957; the building was topped out during November 1958, and occupants began moving into their offices in late 1959. The New York City Landmarks Preservation Commission designated the lobby as a city landmark in 2002. Time Inc. vacated 1271 Avenue of the Americas in 2015, and the building was subsequently renovated between 2015 and 2019.

== Site ==
Buildings of Rockefeller Center
Buildings and structures in Rockefeller Center:
1 1 Rockefeller Plaza
2 10 Rockefeller Plaza
3 La Maison Francaise
4 British Empire Building
5 30 Rockefeller Plaza
6 International Building
7 50 Rockefeller Plaza
8 1230 Avenue of the Americas
9 Radio City Music Hall
10 1270 Avenue of the Americas
11 75 Rockefeller Plaza
12 600 Fifth Avenue
13 608 Fifth Avenue
14 1271 Avenue of the Americas
15 1251 Avenue of the Americas
16 1221 Avenue of the Americas
17 1211 Avenue of the Americas

1271 Avenue of the Americas is on the western side of Sixth Avenue (officially Avenue of the Americas), between 50th and 51st streets, in the Midtown Manhattan neighborhood of New York City. The land lot is rectangular and covers 82,340 square feet (7,650 m^{2}). The site has a frontage of 410 feet (120 m) on 50th and 51st streets and a frontage of 200 feet (61 m) on Sixth Avenue. Nearby buildings include The Michelangelo to the west, Axa Equitable Center to the northwest, 75 Rockefeller Plaza to the northeast, Radio City Music Hall to the east, 30 Rockefeller Plaza to the southeast, and 1251 Avenue of the Americas to the south.

Prior to the development of 1271 Avenue of the Americas, much of the site had previously served as a New York Railways Company trolley barn, which in turn was replaced by a parking lot. There was also a four-story building facing Sixth Avenue and a collection of single-story shops on 50th Street. Rockefeller Center Inc. bought the plots on 50th and 51st streets in the first week of August 1953, followed by those on Sixth Avenue the next week. One building on the site reportedly cost $2 million after its owner had held out. Rockefeller Center's managers originally wanted to build an NBC studio or a Ford vehicle showroom on the site.

== Architecture ==
The building was designed by Harrison & Abramovitz, a firm led by Wallace Harrison and Max Abramovitz. It was constructed by John Lowry and the George A. Fuller Company. Syska Hennessy was hired as the mechanical engineering firm, and Edwards & Hjorth was the structural engineering firm.

1271 Avenue of the Americas was planned as a 48-story tower, rising 587 feet (179 m) and measuring around 310 by 104 feet (94 by 32 m). (Note: According to the New York Herald Tribune, the tower is 315 by 104 feet (96 by 32 m). Architectural Forum states that the tower is 308 by 104.5 feet (93.9 by 31.9 m).) The tower is flanked by shorter segments with setbacks at the third and eighth stories. The north and west edges of the tower are flanked by a seven-story section of the base. An auditorium designed by Gio Ponti, with colored triangles, was installed on the eighth-floor setback. The neighboring Roxy Theatre was acquired as part of the building's development, allowing the building's floor area to be increased under the limits set by the 1916 Zoning Resolution. A provision under the 1916 Zoning Resolution had allowed structures to rise without setbacks above a given level if all subsequent stories covered no more than 25 percent of the land lot. (Note: As per the 1916 Zoning Act, the wall of any given tower that faces a street could only rise to a certain height, proportionate to the street's width, at which point the building had to be set back by a given proportion. This system of setbacks would continue until the tower reaches a floor level in which that level's floor area was 25 percent that of the ground level's area. After that 25 percent threshold was reached, the building could rise without restriction. This law was superseded by the 1961 Zoning Resolution.)

=== Facade ===
1271 Avenue of the Americas' facade is made mostly of glass, which at the time of the building's construction cost the same as a wall made mostly of limestone. The use of a glass facade permitted a higher degree of flexibility on each story compared to a limestone wall of the same size. Before the current facade design was selected, several alternatives were considered. Time Inc. wanted a flush exterior wall, but this was rejected because exterior columns would protrude into the floor area. Another alternative called for an accordion-shaped wall: The windows would have sloped inward, and the spandrel panels between the windows on each story would have sloped outward. The accordion wall, which would have been framed by flat columns, was infeasible because it reduced floor area, required modifications to the drapes and air-conditioning, and was not aesthetically desirable to the architects.

At ground level, there is a canopy over the 51st Street entrance. The rest of the tower has a glass curtain wall. (Note: The Wall Street Journal says the tower's curtain wall covers 450,000 square feet (42,000 m^{2}), while Pei Cobb Freed & Partners cites a much larger figure of 626,000 square feet (58,200 m^{2}).) On all stories, the facade includes structural columns with limestone cladding. The limestone columns frame the glass curtain wall and also serve as an architectural allusion to the other buildings at Rockefeller Center. In addition, more than 40,000 feet (12,000 m) of stainless-steel flashing was placed on the facade. The stainless-steel flashing was meant to last for as long as the building existed; on the setbacks at the base, the flashing was buried inside corners along the roof deck.

The limestone columns are spaced every 28 feet (8.5 m). There are five vertical bays of windows between each set of limestone columns. Each bay has two narrow aluminum mullions flanking the center pane and two larger air-conditioning risers along the outer panes. Originally, each glass pane measured 52 inches (1,300 mm) wide and 56 inches (1,400 mm) tall. The spandrels between the windows on different stories consist of a 0.25-inch-thick (6.4 mm) plate, behind which is a screen made of aluminum mesh. The mechanical pipes and ducts, as well as the floor slabs, are hidden behind the spandrels. The windows were planned as square panes, but the window sills were lowered during the design process so they were only 2.5 feet (0.76 m) above each floor slab. Each spandrel was then covered by a regular glass pane. In the late 2010s, new low-emissivity glazed panels with thermal breaks were installed.

=== Plaza ===
The eastern part of the site was planned with a plaza. The plaza measures 170 feet (52 m) long and 83 feet (25 m) wide and is flanked by the eight-story base. The southern part of the site also has a promenade that is about 30 feet (9.1 m) wide. The plaza has pavers in a serpentine pattern, similar to those found on the sidewalks of Rio de Janeiro's Copacabana Beach. According to the architectural writer Robert A. M. Stern, the pavement was "an illustration of the 'good neighbor' ideals of the Avenue of the Americas Association". Harrison believed the pavers would bring variety to the building's design. The original pavers, designed by Port Morris Tile & Marble Corporation, were removed in 2001 because they were too slippery; the same company reproduced the pattern in rougher terrazzo. In the late 2010s, the sidewalk pattern was extended from the lot line to the curb line.

A seating parapet in the plaza surrounded a reflecting pool with four jets, measuring about 110 by 30 feet (33.5 by 9.1 m). (Note: Architectural Forum cites an area of 109.5 by 30.5 feet (33.4 by 9.3 m), while The New York Times cites an area of 106 by 31 feet (32.3 by 9.4 m).) Another six pools, measuring 33.5 by 6 feet (10.2 by 1.8 m) each, were placed within the plaza. Each pool had a mat made of lead for waterproofing, which in turn was covered by cement and terrazzo. Trees and shrubs were originally also planted on the 50th Street side, while three flagpoles were placed on the section of the plaza facing Sixth Avenue. After the late 2010s renovation, the original decorations were replaced. The new decorations included five pools with fountain jets on Sixth Avenue, in addition to planting beds and seating areas. Also within the plaza is an entrance to the New York City Subway's 47th–50th Streets–Rockefeller Center station, serving the B, D, F, <F>, and M trains.

In 1972, the Association for a Better New York hired William Crovello to create a sculpture at the building called Cubed Curve, measuring 8 feet (2.4 m) wide and 12 feet (3.7 m) wide. The sculpture was inspired by a fluid brush stroke. According to The New York Times, the sculpture marked Time Inc.'s "presence at the center of the media universe". It was moved in 2018 to Ursinus College in Collegeville, Pennsylvania, while the building was being renovated.

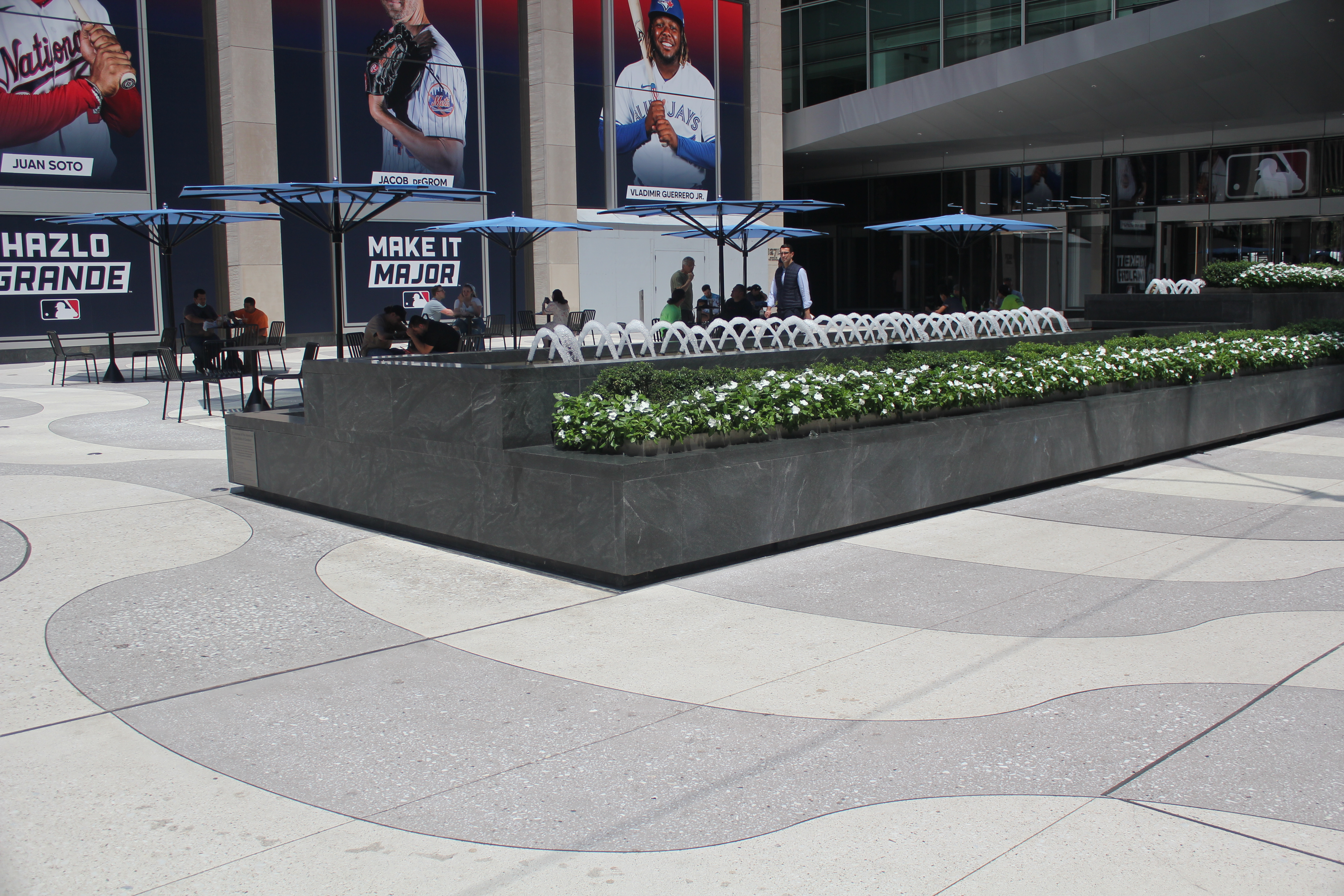
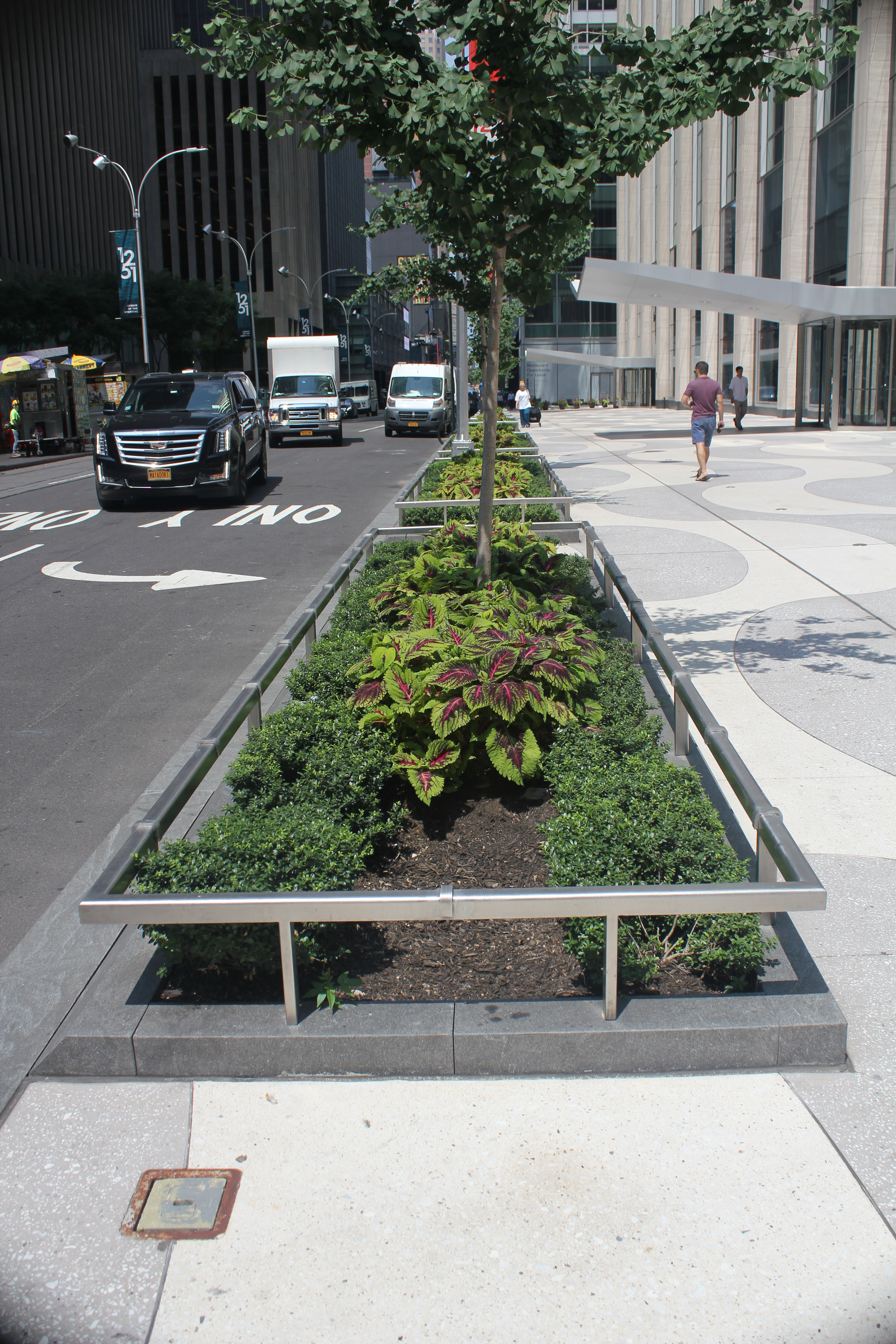
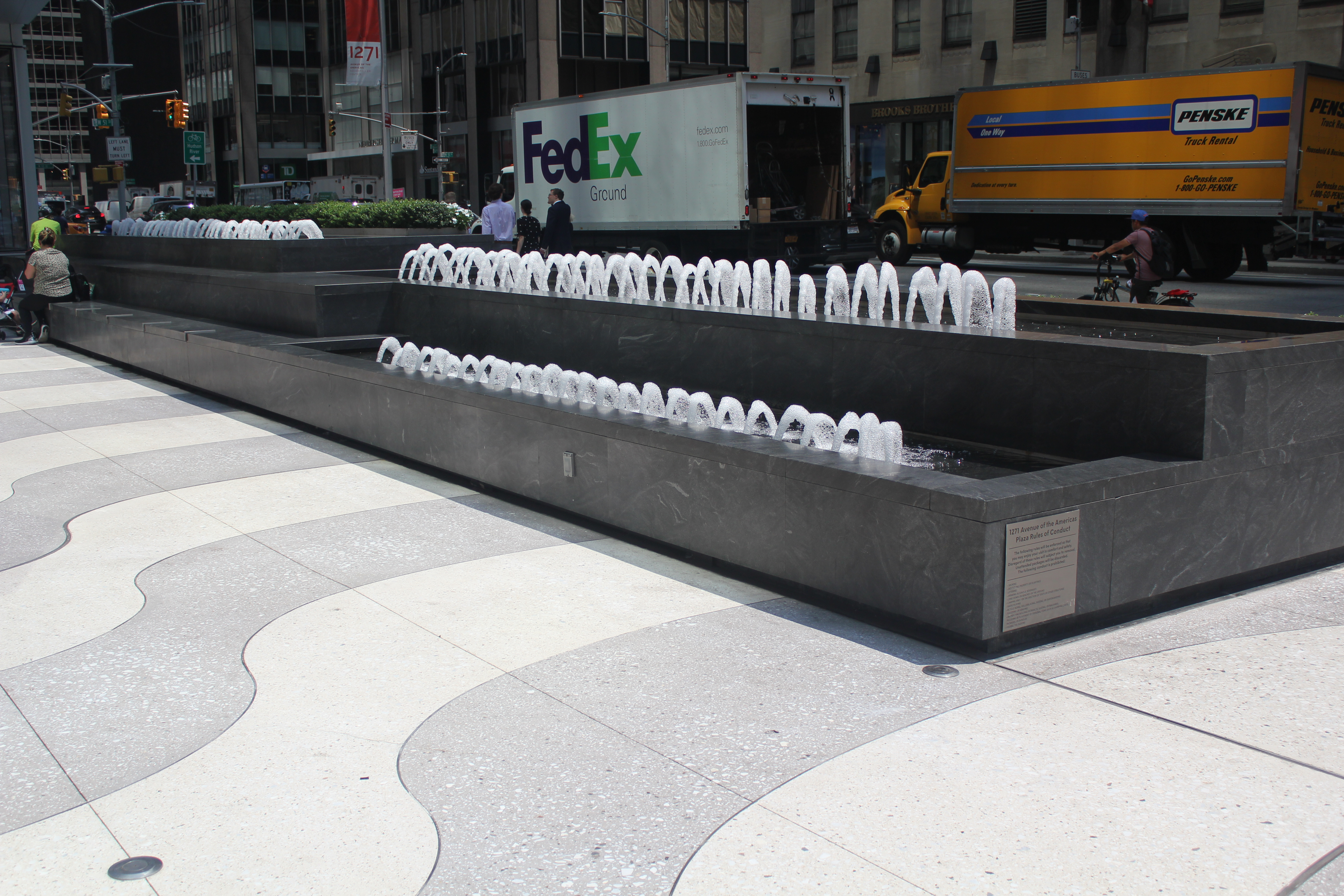
The plaza outside 1271 Avenue of the Americas (pictured in 2021) includes pavers in a serpentine pattern, in addition to planting beds and fountains

=== Interior ===
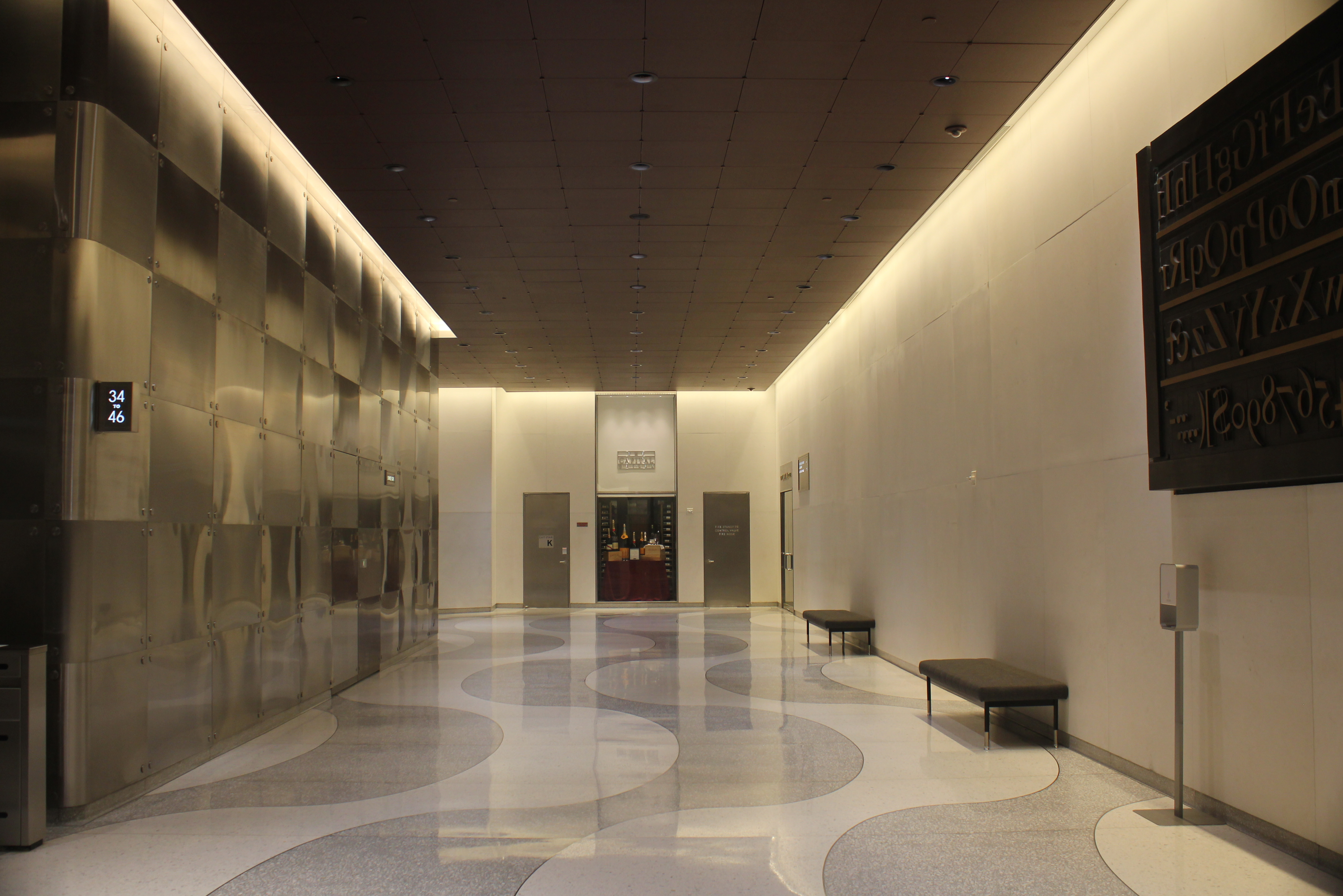
Lobby corridor north of the elevators

1271 Avenue of the Americas was built with about 1,400,000 square feet (130,000 m^{2}) of rentable space. (Note: Architectural Forum cited 1.5 million square feet (140,000 m^{2}) of rentable space and 1.9 million square feet (180,000 m^{2}) of total space.) According to the New York City Department of City Planning, the building has a gross floor area of 1,962,900 square feet (182,360 m^{2}). The interior design was contracted to a variety of architects, including Alexander Girard, Gio Ponti, Charles Eames, William Tabler, and George Nelson & Company. Thirty elevators, within the core, serve the building.

The building's interior is divided into eight air-conditioning zones. Floors 8, 9, and 16 through 34 were originally occupied by Time Inc. and had their own thermostats, accommodating the nonstandard working hours of Time Inc. employees. In conjunction with the building's construction, Rockefeller Center's central air-conditioning system was upgraded in 1957 to provide 6,000 tons of cooling capacity to the building every hour. The cooling systems had to operate all year because Time Inc.'s equipment generated large amounts of heat. The original cooling system was powered by steam, but electric and natural gas cooling systems had been added by 2000. The mechanical spaces are concealed by narrow windows on the facade.

There are three basement stories. The first basement has a passageway leading to Rockefeller Center's underground concourse and the 47th–50th Streets–Rockefeller Center station. The two other basements are not accessible to the public and are used for storage, maintenance, and service functions.

==== Ground floor ====
===== Lobby =====
1271 Avenue of the Americas' lobby is surrounded by commercial spaces on all sides; with the superstructure incorporated in the core and exterior, Harrison could design the lobby with more flexibility. Originally, the lobby was planned to include a covered shopping and exhibit hall on 50th Street and a north–south passage between 50th and 51st streets. These details were changed significantly in the final plan. The lobby has two entrances to the south on 50th Street, one on either side of the core, as well as an entrance to the north on 51st Street, along the east side of the core. The core itself has two west–east passages connected by elevator banks. The more northerly of the east–west passages has stairs and escalators to the second story and the basement. Until the 1990s, the southern passage had been a narrow hallway because there were two storefronts next to it. A breezeway led east to Sixth Avenue, but this had been closed by 2002. Time Inc.'s reception area was within the lobby behind the fountain.

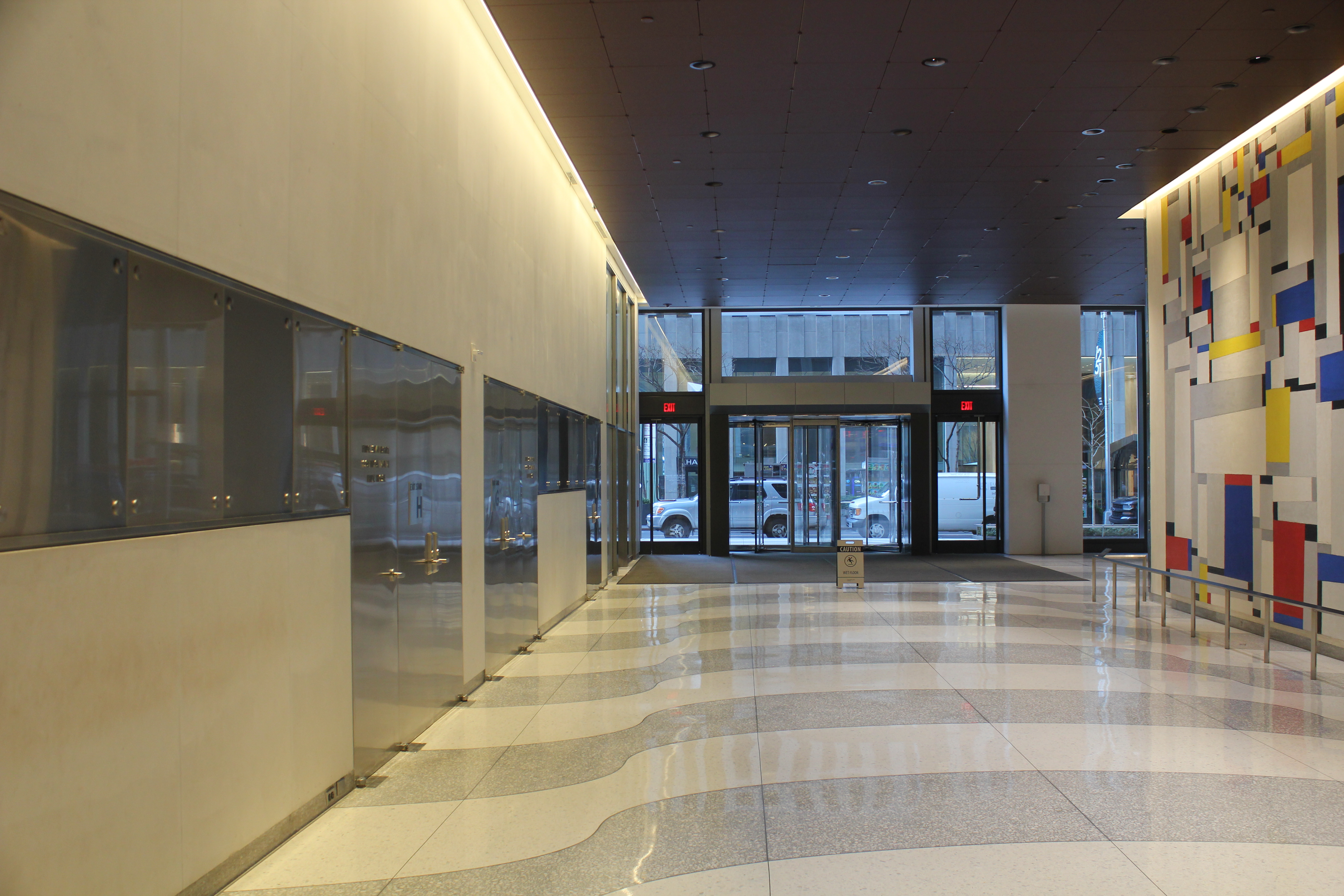
Facing south, along the passageway on the eastern side of the elevator core

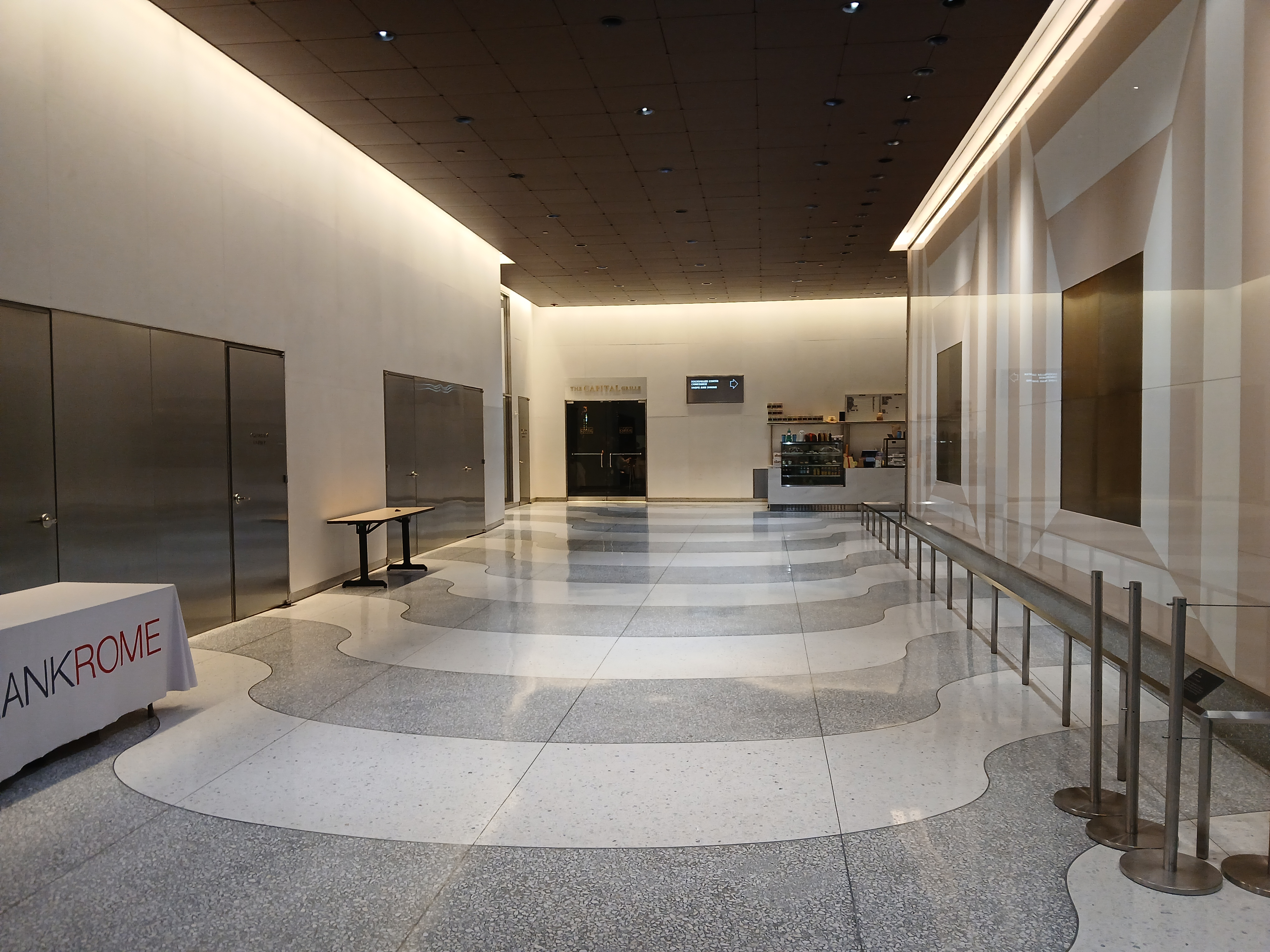
Facing north, along the passageway on the western side of the elevator core

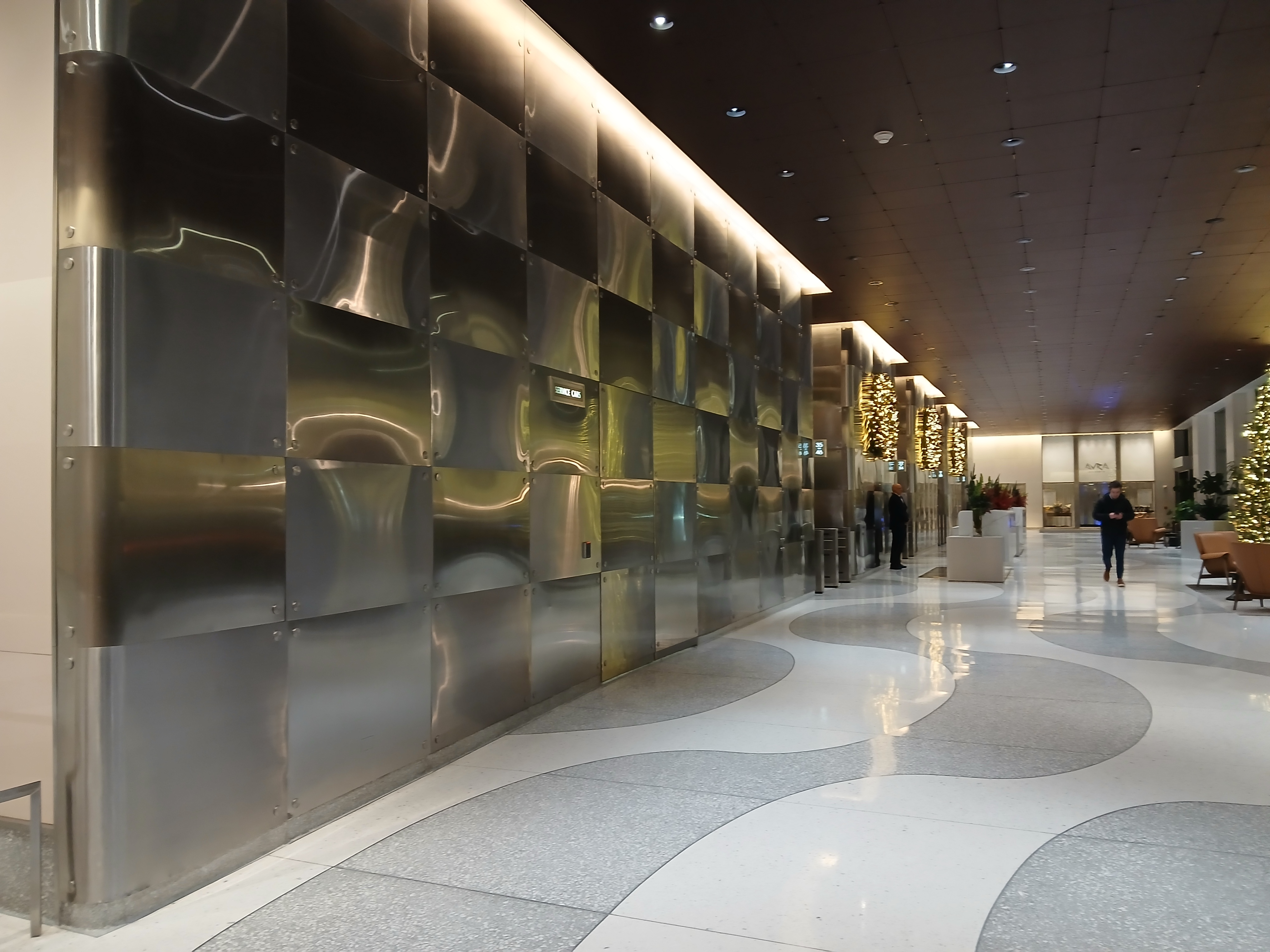
Facing east, along the passageway on the southern side of the elevator core

The lobby has the same style of pavement as the plaza outside the building. The original tiles were installed by the American Mosaic & Tile Company. They were made of white cementitious terrazzo with stainless steel borders, aligned west–east. The southern section of the lobby was expanded in the 1990s, over the site of the storefronts there, but the extended floor did not match the original pavement. The entire lobby was resurfaced in the late 2010s with marble-based terrazzo tiles that matched the original floor design. Because the marble tiles had contained natural veins of black rock, contractors manually removed the veins before installing the tiles.

The walls are largely made of plate-glass windows and white marble panels. Around the core, the walls are made of stainless steel rectangular panels. The steel panels are designed to complement the floor colors and are arranged in a checkerboard pattern. The ceiling throughout the lobby is 16 feet (4.9 m) high and was originally made of dark maroon glass tiles, finished in a matte covering. There were white lighting coves in some tiles. Manufactured by American-Saint Gobain Corporation, the glass tiles were suspended from washers at each corner and were designed to be removed for maintenance. In the late 2010s, the original glass ceiling was replaced with reddish-burgundy tiles of similar design, which matched the original color.

The lobby walls contain large murals by Josef Albers and Fritz Glarner, both of whom Harrison had known for many years. Glarner's mural, entitled Relational Painting No. 88, measures 40 by 15 feet (12.2 by 4.6 m) and is mounted east of the elevators. It includes overlapping red, yellow, blue, gray, and black geometric shapes on a white background. Albers's mural, entitled Portals, measures 42 by 14 feet (12.8 by 4.3 m) and is mounted west of the elevators. Portals includes alternating bands of white and brown glass, which surround a set of bronze and nickel plates in a way that gives the impression of depth. Relational Painting No. 88 was installed in April 1960, while Portals was installed twelve months later. Another artwork by Fortune art director Francis Brennan was installed north of the elevators in January 1965. Brennan's work consists of a relief measuring 13 by 6 feet (4.0 by 1.8 m), which contains all the letters of the alphabet in the Caslon 471 typeface.

===== Storefronts =====
When 1271 Avenue of the Americas opened, there was a Manufacturers Trust bank branch within the northeast corner of the base, next to the lobby. There had also been two storefronts along the southern end of the lobby, next to the west–east corridor there, but the storefronts were removed in the 1990s.

Along the lobby's west side was La Fonda del Sol (the Inn of the Sun), a Latin American–themed restaurant operated by Joseph Baum of Restaurant Associates. The interiors were designed by Alexander Girard and furniture by Charles Eames. La Fonda had an elaborate entry foyer and a set of dining spaces leading to the largest dining room. The dining rooms were decorated with Latin American artifacts, and each of the dining rooms was furnished in vivid colors with at least two hues of fabrics. It relocated elsewhere in 1971 and was replaced with a bank branch. Originally used by the Seaman's Bank for Savings, the branch had round steel columns as well as green marble counters with flecks of white. As of 2021, the businesses in the lobby include the Capital Grille and Ted's Montana Grill.

==== Upper floors ====
===== Offices =====
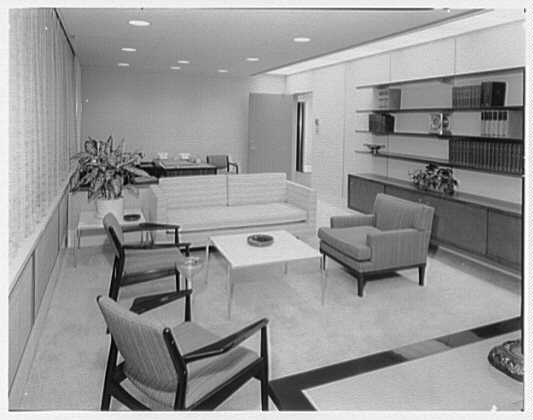
Curtiss-Wright office in the building (1960)

The seven lowest stories each have about 62,000 square feet (5,800 m^{2}) of floor space. Each of the upper stories has around 28,000 square feet (2,600 m^{2}), largely uninterrupted by columns. These were among the largest floor slabs of any office building in New York City since World War II. All stairs and elevators are placed in the core, leaving the outer section of each floor available for use. This improved the efficiency of each floor by allowing an open plan for the offices. The arrangement of the building allowed high flexibility in planning interior offices. An office module in the building generally measured 48 by 56 inches (1.2 by 1.4 m), though these could be combined as necessary. The interior arrangement was inspired by that of the PSFS Building in Philadelphia, Pennsylvania.

The firm Designs for Business was responsible for the design of Time Inc.'s space, which originally spanned 21 stories. Time Inc. had to fit multiple small rooms and cubicles on each of its floors, but the company was largely able to fit these rooms and cubicles within the modular system. Square aluminum posts were installed in Time Inc.'s space, through which partition panels could be installed. The panels were made of a myriad of materials including wood, plastic, burlap, and glass, though they were initially not soundproof. Mockups of the offices were manufactured at Astoria, Queens, as well as in Time Inc.'s earlier headquarters at 1 Rockefeller Plaza. The elevator lobbies on each of Time Inc.'s stories had different decorations. The 28th floor also had a photo gallery where photojournalist Alfred Eisenstaedt worked.

After Charles Eames designed the chairs for Time Inc.'s offices, he created a new chair design in 1961, which was nicknamed the Time-Life Chair. Eames designed them as a favor to Henry Luce, the founder of Time and Life magazines, who had allowed Eames to use photos from the Time-Life archives for the pavilion he designed at the 1959 American National Exhibition in Moscow. The chairs remain in production during the 21st century, albeit with modifications for stability and to meet updated product codes.

Other offices in the building originally included the second-story offices of the Gilman Paper Company, designed by SLS-Environetics and connected to the lobby by an escalator. The vestibule at the top of the escalators had stainless-steel wall and a carpet that extended across the floor and part of the walls. Gilman's reception area had an angular reception desk and lighting fixtures made of stainless steel. Gilman's offices had ceilings measuring 13 feet (4.0 m) tall, with angular furniture, sculpted ducts and lighting elements, exposed structural beams, and a color-coding scheme to distinguish the different departments. The Rockefeller Group also has an office on the 24th floor, which was redesigned in 2020 by the firm of Fogarty Finger. The Rockefeller Group's offices include a reception area with dark woods and a pantry designed in a mid-century modern style. There are open plan workspaces with dropped ceilings, as well as executive offices and meeting spaces with glass walls.

===== Auditorium =====
Gio Ponti designed an auditorium at the setback above the eighth floor, along with an adjoining kitchen, dining room, reception area, and lounge. This space was meant for meetings with advertisers and corporate and sales functions. The space was arranged with walls at irregular angles and originally had colored glass-block walls and Sicilian paintings. The auditorium itself had a domed ceiling, while the ceiling in the adjoining spaces contained brass motifs. The floors were yellow with green and blue streaks, and geometric wooden furniture was specially designed for the space. The auditorium was closed by 1981, and the furniture was sold. It was redesigned by Davis, Brody & Associates in 1983 and became a conference center.

===== Hemisphere Club and Tower Suite =====
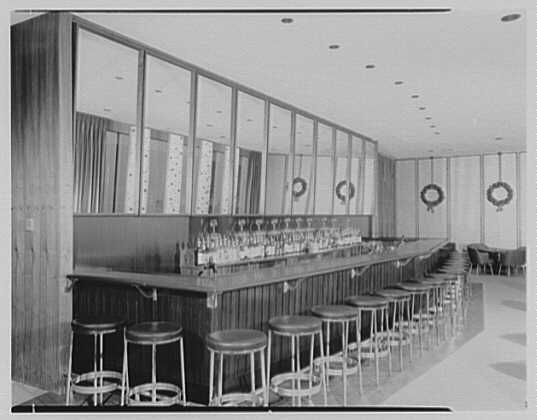
Hemisphere Club (1960)

The Hemisphere Club and Tower Suite shared a space on the 48th floor, which was designed by George Nelson & Company. During the day, the Hemisphere Club was a 250-seat private club for executives that, when the building opened, charged $1,000 for initiation and $360 in annual fees thereafter. This made the Hemisphere Club one of several private clubs at the tops of New York City skyscrapers. In the evenings, the restaurant space opened to the public as the Tower Suite, which originally offered meals for $8.50 per person. The restaurant was operated by Restaurant Associates. George Nelson designed special chairs for the restaurant, which apparently were never manufactured. Since the windows split the view from the 48th floor into many sections, the space was designed with window embrasures.

The New Yorker reported several years after the Tower Suite's opening that "a butler in a black tailcoat and a maid in a fluffy white apron" visited every table seven days a week. When the restaurant opened, Craig Claiborne of The New York Times called it "for the most part, excellent"; by 1970, New York magazine had called it "the baneful cumulus atop Time Inc." According to New York Times food critic Florence Fabricant, the Tower Suite may have originated the trend of servers introducing themselves to guests. When business at the Hemisphere Club declined with the construction of taller buildings in the area, the space was renovated so it could function as a dining hall at night. Dinners at the Tower Suite cost $11.50 per person in 1970, but they had increased to $70–130 per person by 1990. The Hemisphere Club closed in the 1990s.

== History ==
The media firm Time Inc. had been housed at 1 Rockefeller Plaza since 1937, when that building had opened as part of the construction of Rockefeller Center. As early as 1946, it had sought to develop the site of the Hotel Marguery at 270 Park Avenue for a 35-story headquarters designed by Harrison & Abramovitz, though the plans did not come to fruition. By 1953, Time Inc. was set to outgrow its existing space in 1 Rockefeller Plaza within a year, and it wanted to have its headquarters in a single building. Time Inc. seriously considered relocating to Westchester County, a northern suburb of New York City, as well as to a suburb of Philadelphia. By November 1955, the company had decided to stay in New York City because of the large number of transportation options there.

=== Construction ===
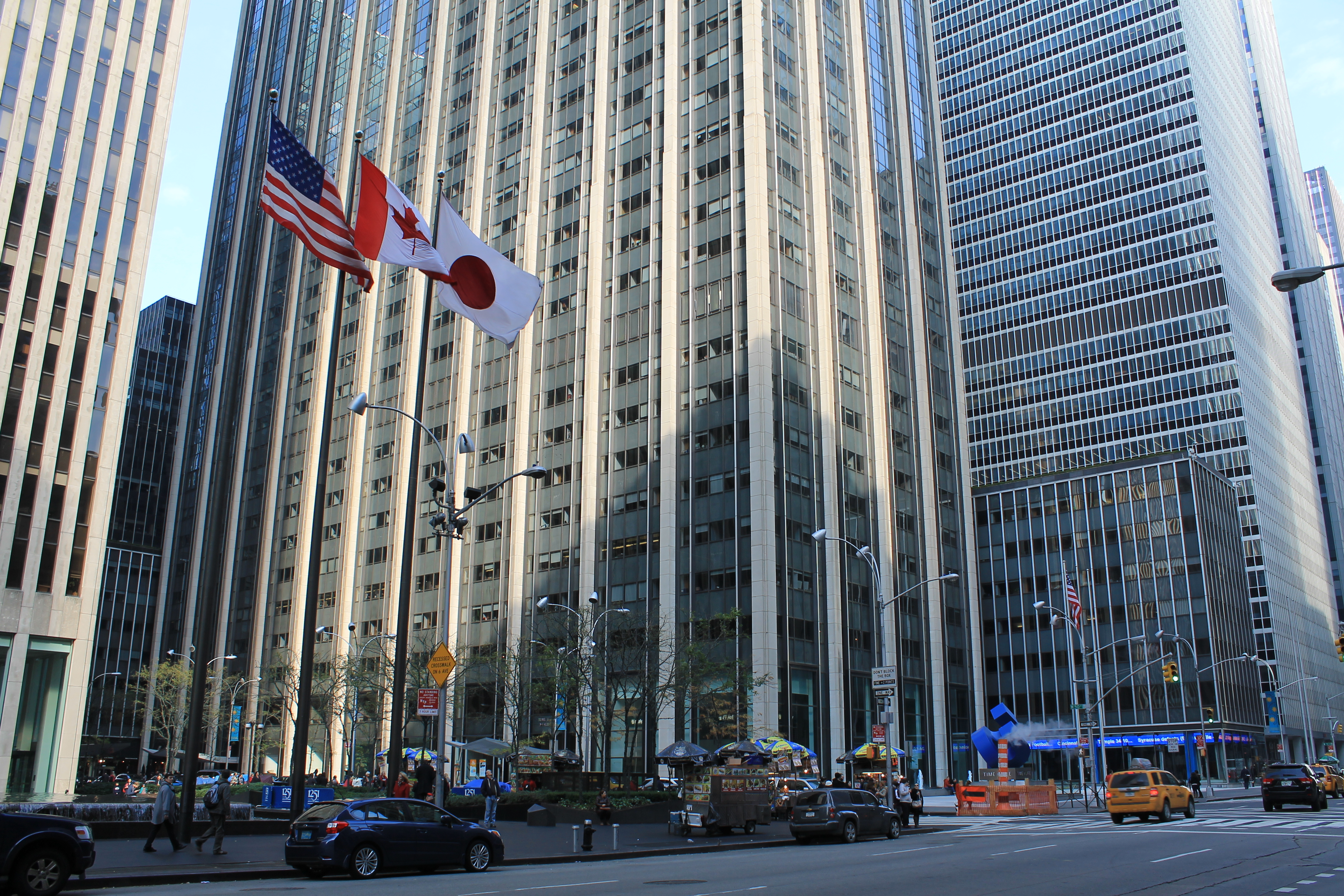
Seen from 49th Street (2012)

Once Rockefeller Center Inc.'s managers learned of Time Inc.'s predicament, they hired Harrison & Abramovitz to create plans for a building on Rockefeller Center Inc.'s vacant plot that could house both NBC and Time. The plans involved creating several elevation drawings as well as a 15-minute film. NBC ultimately dropped out of the project because its CEO, David Sarnoff, dissented. Rockefeller Center Inc. acquired the Roxy Theater in August 1956. That December, officials announced the construction of the Time-Life Building. When the plans were announced, Time had leased 600,000 square feet (56,000 m^{2}) in the building, and American Cyanamid, Shell Oil Company, McCann-Erickson, and Esso had already made lease agreements for other floors. The developers had already ordered 27,000 tons of structural steel to be delivered in early 1958.

Time Inc. and Rockefeller Center Inc. formed a joint venture, Rock-Time Inc., to share the tower's rental income. Rockefeller Center had the majority stake of 55 percent, and Time Inc. had the remaining 45 percent. Harrison & Abramovitz filed plans for the building in March 1957. (Note: While the architects gave a cost estimate of $45 million in the filing, the developers had announced the building's cost at $70 million.) A groundbreaking ceremony occurred on May 16, 1957, marking the start of excavation. By the following month, the building was 70 percent leased, and Curtiss-Wright and Westinghouse Electric Corporation had become tenants. The Rockefeller Center Sidewalk Superintendents' Club, composed of members of the public who wanted to observe Rockefeller Center's construction, was revived after having been dormant for seventeen years. The actress Marilyn Monroe presided over the club's inaugural ceremonies that July. The site was excavated to a depth of 40 feet (12 m), where there was a layer of Manhattan schist.

By November 1957, the excavations were largely complete; the Rockefeller Foundation had leased offices and two tenants had expanded their lease commitments. Rockefeller Center Inc. chairman Nelson Rockefeller and Time Inc. president Roy E. Larsen announced details of the design the same month. Construction on the Time-Life Building's superstructure started in April 1958. That August, the Equitable Life Assurance Society lent the project's developers $50 million. At the time, it was the largest-ever financing on a single real-estate parcel. The structure topped out in November of that year. The next April, Time Inc. sublet six of the 21 floors under its control. The building was 92 percent leased by then, including the space that was being sublet. The Time-Life Building's cornerstone was laid in June 1959, at the southeast corner of the building, after the superstructure had been completed.

=== Late 20th century ===
The first tenant, the American Cyanamid Company, began moving into the tower in October 1959. Over the next couple of months, tenants began moving into the building and the final interior design elements were installed. By that December, the construction fence around 1271 Avenue of the Americas had been dismantled and several companies had occupied their space. Additional leases were announced in January 1960, including one storefront. A passageway from the basement to the subway station opened the next month. Life magazine moved into the building that April, writing that its new headquarters was "a victory in the fight to improve down-at-the-heels Sixth Avenue". Ultimately, Time Inc. was able to sublet part of its space to more than forty firms. By late 1961, the building was almost completely occupied.

La Fonda del Sol had moved out of the Time & Life Building to a smaller location by early 1971. The restaurant space was replaced by a Seaman's Trust bank branch. The bank was so popular that, in three weeks, it performed six months' worth of transactions. Although Life magazine stopped publishing in 1972, the building retained its name, and the former Life space was quickly taken by the company's other publications, such as People and Money. A U.S. Steakhouse restaurant designed by Gwathmey Siegel & Associates Architects opened in the building in 1975 and was slightly renovated a few years later. By 1981, Time Inc. occupied about 1,000,000 square feet (93,000 m^{2}) of space and some of its divisions, such as HBO, had to be housed in other buildings. The eighth-floor auditorium was renovated in 1983. An electric cooling system was also added in the early 1980s to supplement the original steam-powered cooling system.

Time Inc. sold its 45 percent ownership stake in December 1986 to the Rockefeller Group for $118 million. Time Inc. planned to use some of the proceeds from the sale for other purchases such as stock buybacks. In the same transaction, Time Inc. extended its lease from 1997 to 2007, with an option to extend its lease by another ten years, to 2017. Time Inc. executed its option to extend its lease in 1999. At the time, the company occupied 80 percent of the Time & Life Building and it had rented space at the adjacent 135 West 50th Street. The two buildings were to be connected internally on the second floor as part of a $190 million renovation. A natural-gas cooling system was added in 2000; at the time, it was New York City's only building with three cooling sources.

=== 21st century ===
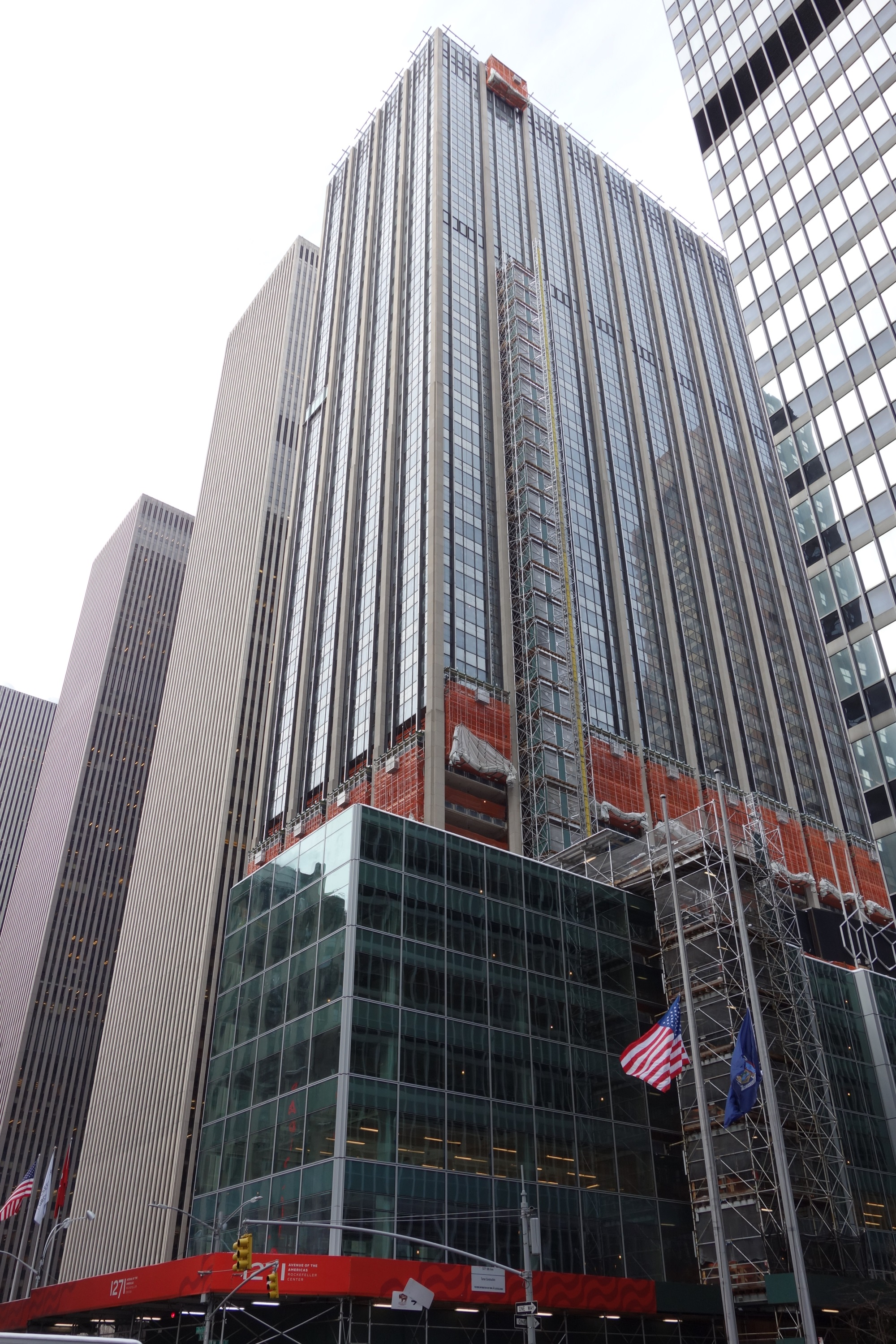
The building, undergoing renovation during 2018

By August 2001, Time Inc. was part of AOL Time Warner and occupied 98 percent of the building's space. That month, AOL Time Warner subsidiary CNN and the Rockefeller Group agreed to convert a former Chase Manhattan Bank branch at the base into a two-story CNN television studio. In July 2002, the New York City Landmarks Preservation Commission designated the lobby interior as a city landmark. Municipal Art Society executive director Frank E. Sanchis III prompted the Rockefeller Group to support the preservation of the lobby. At the time, the lobby was being renovated by Swanke Hayden Connell Architects for $40 million. The renovation involved combining two storefronts into a waiting lounge, as well as creating a secure area around the elevators. The CNN studio opened in September 2002, with scenic design by Production Design Group. The Ted's Montana Grill restaurant opened in 2006 on the ground level.

In May 2014, Time Inc. announced it was planning to leave the Time & Life Building for the Brookfield Place complex in lower Manhattan. The following year, Time Inc. moved out of its offices, and the Rockefeller Group announced a $325 million renovation of the entire building, designed by Pei Cobb Freed & Partners. As part of the renovation, the architects created a new entrance on Sixth Avenue, repaved the plaza, and replaced the facade. All 30 elevator cabs were replaced with new cabs whose ceiling design was an homage to the 51st Street canopy. The Rockefeller Group also restored the lobby and renamed the building to its address. Time Inc. removed a time capsule that had been embedded in the building when its cornerstone was laid. The time capsule included contemporary objects such as magazines, photography books, a pencil, and a microfilm about the Rockefeller Center complex. Glarner's and Albers's paintings were restored, and the floors, ceilings, and signs were modified to match the original design. The building was completely vacant by the beginning of 2018.

The renovation was nearly completed by 2019, and the building was fully leased at that time. The building's major tenants included financial firms such as American International Group, Greenhill & Co., H.I.G. Capital, and Mizuho Financial Group. The other tenants included law firms Blank Rome and Latham & Watkins, as well as multi-family office Bessemer Trust on the top seven floors. In addition, Major League Baseball moved its headquarters to the building, and it leased two stories in the building's base for use as an MLB store, which opened in 2020.

With the onset of the COVID-19 pandemic in New York City, the building stood largely empty for several months in 2020. The building received a Leadership in Energy and Environmental Design (LEED) Gold certification the same year. The building was again fully leased by May 2021, and the Greek restaurant Avra Estiatorio leased a two-story space at the base, which opened in June 2022. Another restaurant, Cuerno New York, opened in the building in 2025.

== Impact ==
Upon the building's completion, Architectural Forum wrote: "The building's character reflects a joining of partners, a marriage of uses, a meld of design, and a union between New York's two generic office-building types. [...] In skyscraper society, the Time & Life Building is upper-middle-class." New York Times critic Ada Louise Huxtable, writing in 1960, said that 1271 Avenue of the Americas, 28 Liberty Street, and 270 Park Avenue all had a "still too-rare esthetic excellence". Huxtable also characterized 1271 Avenue of the Americas' spaces as "flexible architectural anarchy". Another architectural critic, Carter B. Horsley, praised the lobby's design and materials, though he believed the facade had an inconspicuous, albeit "not terrible", design.

The Time & Life Building's completion spurred the construction of similar office buildings along Sixth Avenue. The architect Robert A. M. Stern wrote in his 1995 book New York 1960 that the building "marked the first key step" in the avenue's reconstruction. Architectural Forum wrote that the building's completion "opens a wide frontier for an expanding city", leading the way for the construction of other large office buildings west of Sixth Avenue.

1271 Avenue of the Americas has appeared in several media works. The building was featured in the television series Mad Men as the fictional headquarters of the advertising agency Sterling Cooper Draper Pryce (later Sterling Cooper & Partners). AMC, the network on which Mad Men airs, unveiled a bench in front of the building in 2015; it contains a sculpture of lead character Don Draper's black silhouette, as shown in the show's opening credits. The 2013 film The Secret Life of Walter Mitty was partially set within the building.

== See also ==
- List of New York City Designated Landmarks in Manhattan from 14th to 59th Streets
