= 75 Rockefeller Plaza =

Office skyscraper in Manhattan, New York

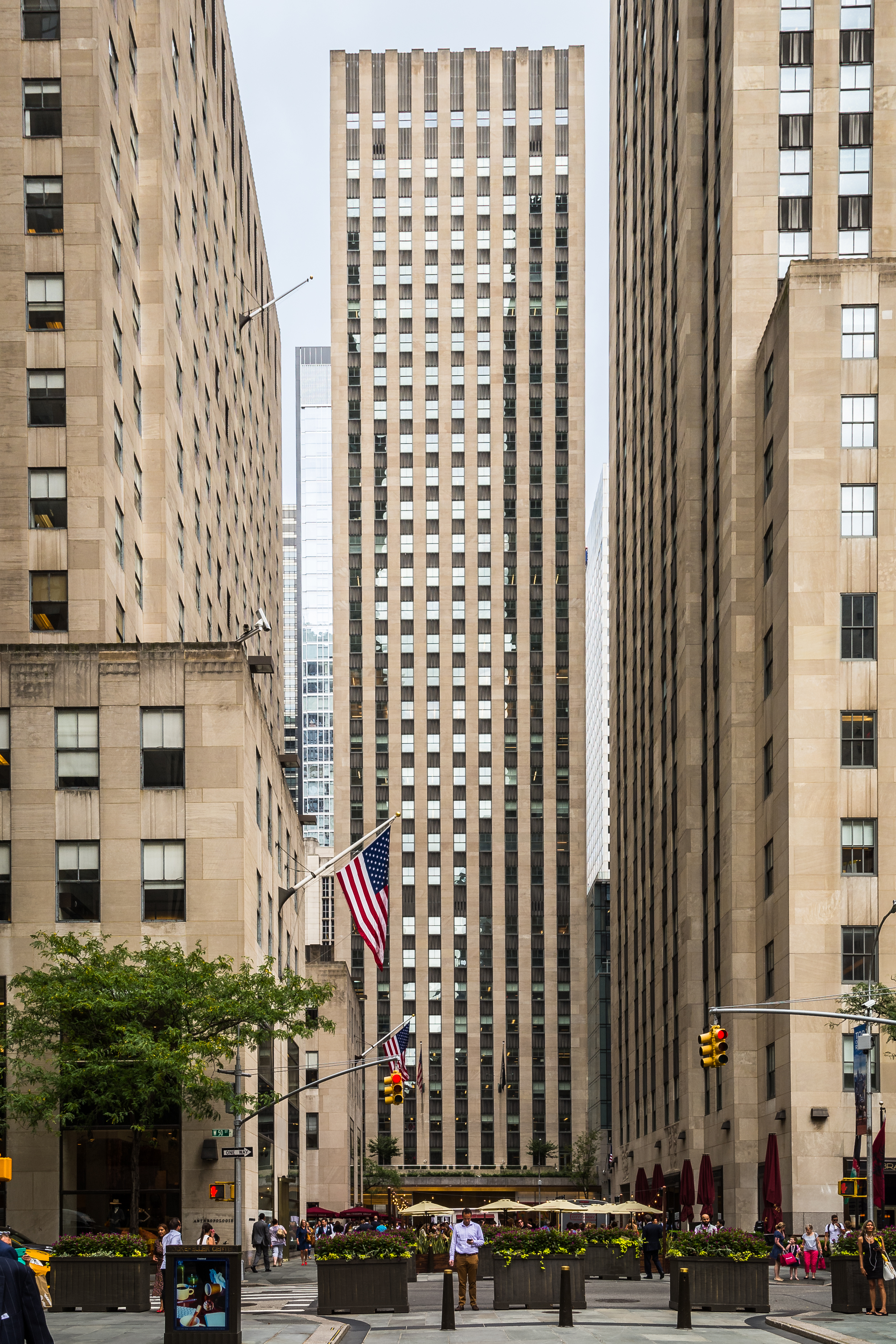
- 75 Rockefeller Plaza
- Interactive map of the 75 Rockefeller Plaza area
- Former names: AOL Time Warner Building (2001–2003), Time Warner Building (1990–2001), Warner Communications Building (1973–1990), Esso Building (1947–1973)

General information
- Status: Completed
- Type: Office
- Location: 15 West 51st Street, New York City, United States
- Coordinates: 40.7599°N 73.9778°W
- Current tenants: BasePoint Capital; NCH Capital; Guidehouse; Pallas LLP; Convene
- Construction started: July 1946
- Completed: September 1947
- Owner: Mohamed Al Fayed
- Landlord: RXR Realty

Height
- Height: 424 ft (129 m)

Technical details
- Material: Steel
- Floor count: 33
- Floor area: 578,237 sq ft (53,720.0 m^{2})
- Lifts/elevators: 14 (12 passenger, 2 service)

Design and construction
- Architects: Carson & Lundin; Wallace K. Harrison
- Developer: The Rockefeller Group

Buildings of Rockefeller Center
Buildings and structures in Rockefeller Center:
1 1 Rockefeller Plaza
2 10 Rockefeller Plaza
3 La Maison Francaise
4 British Empire Building
5 30 Rockefeller Plaza
6 International Building
7 50 Rockefeller Plaza
8 1230 Avenue of the Americas
9 Radio City Music Hall
10 1270 Avenue of the Americas
11 75 Rockefeller Plaza
12 600 Fifth Avenue
13 608 Fifth Avenue
14 1271 Avenue of the Americas
15 1251 Avenue of the Americas
16 1221 Avenue of the Americas
17 1211 Avenue of the Americas

75 Rockefeller Plaza is a skyscraper on the north side of 51st Street in New York City, originally built as a northern extension of Rockefeller Center.

== History ==
In July 1944, the Rockefellers began planning a new 16-story tower to house the Standard Oil Company (Esso), which had outgrown its lease at the nearby 30 Rockefeller Plaza. The structure was completed in 1947 in the early Modernist style. It was originally known as the Esso Building. At completion, the building was the tallest completely air-conditioned building in New York City and the first in Rockefeller Center. The building also housed Schrafft's Restaurant, which had a capacity of 1,283 people, making it the largest restaurant in the world at the time. Standard Oil's successor, Exxon, moved to the newly built 1251 Avenue of the Americas in 1971.

In 1973, the building's heating, ventilation, and air-conditioning systems were replaced, along with some upgrades to the electrical systems. After these renovations, Warner Communications (later Time Warner) leased all 570,000 square feet (53,000 m^{2}) of Exxon's former space, which led to the building becoming known as the Warner Communications Building. Warner initially occupied only 340,000 square feet (32,000 m^{2}) of space and subleased the rest to tenants including the Financial Times, Thomson-CSF, PBS, and The Economist.

In December 1996, a fire at the TGI Fridays in the basement of the building led to a minor explosion in a top-floor equipment room, causing the building to be evacuated. In 2012, Time Warner indicated that they would not be renewing their space in the building due to their move to Time Warner Center, which would leave the building virtually empty in 2014.

After Time Warner vacated the space, Rockefeller Center's owners brought in RXR Realty by a $500 million, 99-year lease to manage the building's office space. As part of the deal, RXR would spend $250 million to renovate the building in a plan designed by Kohn Pedersen Fox. The renovation included a new lobby, replacement of the elevator cabs, new mechanical, electrical, plumbing, and HVAC systems, and a complete façade restoration.

Following the renovation, RXR secured Merrill Lynch Wealth Management as the anchor tenant in June 2016 with a 125,000 square feet (11,600 m^{2}) lease. The American Girl Store also signed a 2-story, 40,000 square feet (3,700 m^{2}) lease to relocate its flagship store from nearby Fifth Avenue. In August 2017, Austrian bank Erste Group signed a 14,000 square feet (1,300 m^{2}) lease in the building for their New York outpost. In October 2018, co-working startup Convene announced plans to open a 14,000 square feet (1,300 m^{2}), invite-only "Club 75" on the 32nd floor with a library, dining space, lounge, and event space.
