= 1 Rockefeller Plaza =

Building in Manhattan, New York

Coordinates: 40.758°N 73.979°W

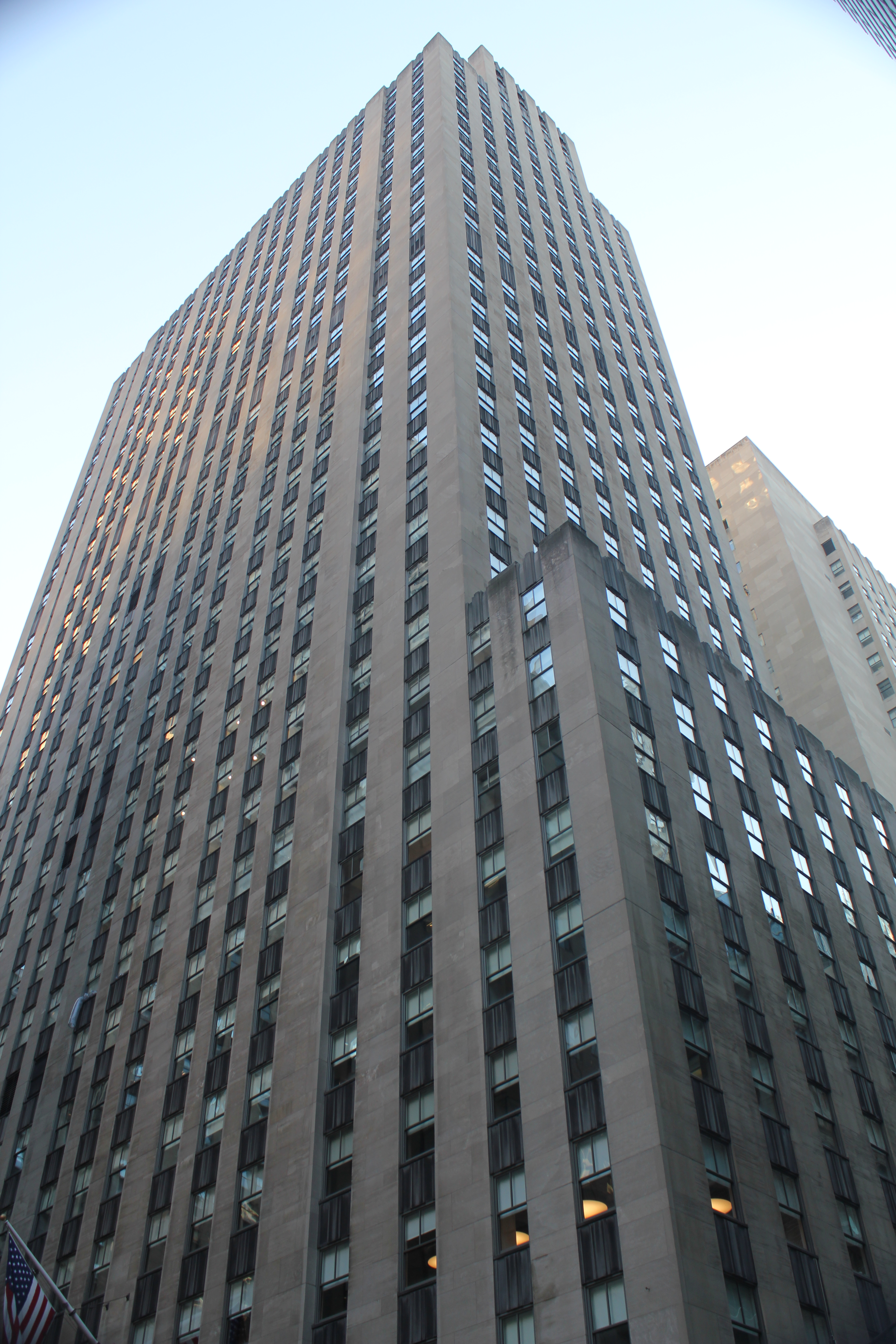
1 Rockefeller Plaza

1 Rockefeller Plaza (formerly the Time & Life Building and the General Dynamics Building) is a 36-story building located on the east side of Rockefeller Plaza between 48th and 49th Streets in Midtown Manhattan, New York City. Completed in 1937, the tower is part of Rockefeller Center and, like the rest of the complex, was built in the Art Deco style.

== Design ==
Buildings of Rockefeller Center
Buildings and structures in Rockefeller Center:
1 1 Rockefeller Plaza
2 10 Rockefeller Plaza
3 La Maison Francaise
4 British Empire Building
5 30 Rockefeller Plaza
6 International Building
7 50 Rockefeller Plaza
8 1230 Avenue of the Americas
9 Radio City Music Hall
10 1270 Avenue of the Americas
11 75 Rockefeller Plaza
12 600 Fifth Avenue
13 608 Fifth Avenue
14 1271 Avenue of the Americas
15 1251 Avenue of the Americas
16 1221 Avenue of the Americas
17 1211 Avenue of the Americas

The 36-story tower at 1 Rockefeller Plaza, on the east side of the plaza between 48th and 49th Streets, is the original Time & Life Building. The tower contains a 10th-floor setback on the 48th Street side, while its 49th Street side is actually set back from the street, rising as a slab. The Rockefeller Plaza side is almost a slab except for the 10th-story setback, and the eastern side connects to 600 Fifth Avenue via a seven-story annex. Its north-south axis aligns with the since-modified alignment of the International Building. One Rockefeller's artwork was designed for a generic tenant, with a general life theme.

=== Artwork ===
Above the 49th Street entrance is Lee Lawrie's bas-relief "Progress". The sculpture depicts progress through an overlapping cast of characters: Pegasus, representing inspiration, Columbia, a traditional female symbol of the United States, and an eagle. In addition, Attilio Piccirilli's "Joy of Life" limestone relief, depicts a hedonistic Dionysus enjoying wine. The entrance portal is decorated with C. Paul Jennewein's limestone carvings of industry and agriculture. Carl Milles created a three-part wood-and-silver sculpture near the top of the lobby's western wall. It is called "Människan och Naturen" or "Man and Nature" and was created from 1938 to 1941. The right-hand carving depicts a wooden faun pushing nature away, while the left-side carving consists of a wooden nymph in the foliage, and the central carving depicts a wooden man on horseback listening to a metal Mexican nightingale that every hour on the hour opens its beak and sings a recording of a Mexican Nightingale from the Bronx Zoo.

== History ==
Rockefeller Center occupies three blocks in Midtown Manhattan bounded by Fifth and Sixth Avenues to the east and west, between 48th Street to the south and 51st Street to the north. By 1936, most of the complex had been completed. Rockefeller Center Inc. only needed to develop three empty plots in the middle of the complex's northern and southern blocks. The site of 1 Rockefeller Plaza, located on the southern block, was being used as a parking lot, and at the time, it was the city's largest parking facility.

In 1936, Time Inc. expressed interest in moving out of their Chrysler Building offices into a larger headquarters, having just launched their Life magazine. Rockefeller Center's managers persuaded Time to move to a proposed skyscraper on part of the southern empty lot, located on Rockefeller Plaza between 48th and 49th Streets, by promising the company seven floors and a penthouse; space to expand; a 20-year lease; and the right to name the building after themselves. Excavation for a new building at 1 Rockefeller Plaza, numbered 9 Rockefeller Plaza at the time, started in June 1936. The original plans stipulated a 32-story building, but the height was increased to 36 stories with the use of setbacks on the 48th Street elevation. The number of setbacks was minimized, which increased rentable space within the building, and the original blueprints for the plot were retained for the Time & Life Building. The steelwork for that building was laid on September 25, 1936, and was complete by November 28, forty-three working days later. The Time & Life Building, as it was known, (Note: The "Time-Life Building" appellation would later apply to 1271 Avenue of the Americas, also located in Rockefeller Center, which opened in 1959. Afterward, the original Time & Life Building became known as 1 Rockefeller Plaza.) opened on April 1, 1937, along with the final block of Rockefeller Plaza abutting the building, between 48th and 49th Streets. Time moved into the building in 1938. Time Inc's lease stipulated that nothing else could be constructed within 200 feet (61 m) of the Time & Life Building's uppermost floors.

The original tenants included the Girl Scouts of the USA and Museum of Modern Art, but Time Inc. itself did not move into the building for another year after its completion. In 1960, the building was renamed for General Dynamics after Time Inc. had moved into 1271 Avenue of the Americas, the new Time-Life Building located three blocks away. The tower was renamed for its street address after General Dynamics moved to St. Louis in 1971.
