= 1221 Avenue of the Americas =

Office skyscraper in Manhattan, New York

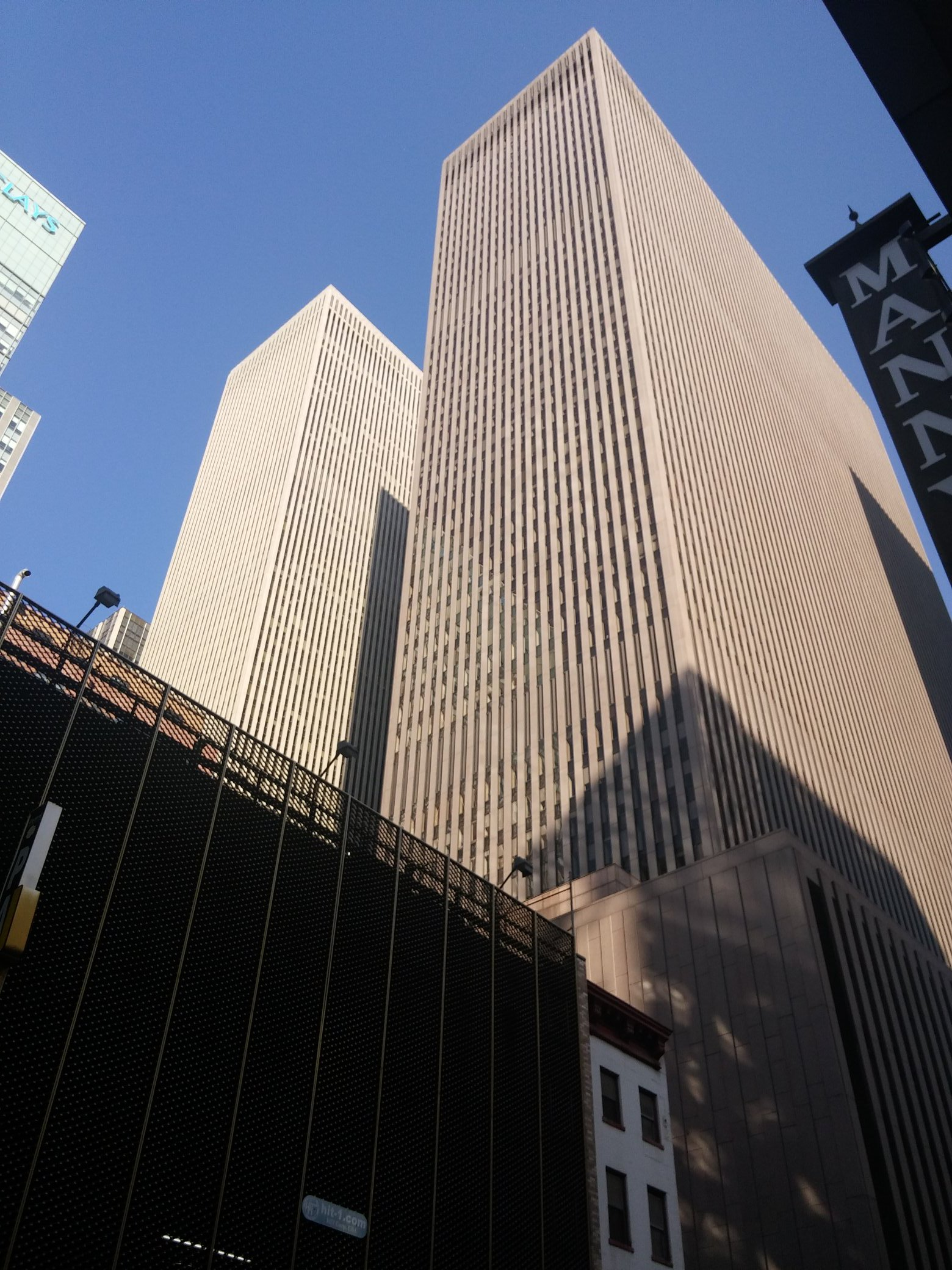
- 1221 Avenue of the Americas with 1251 Avenue of the Americas visible to its left
- Former names: McGraw-Hill Building

General information
- Status: Completed
- Type: Office
- Architectural style: International style
- Location: 1221 Avenue of the Americas; New York, NY 10020; U.S.
- Coordinates: 40°45′34″N 73°58′56″W
- Construction started: 1966
- Completed: 1969
- Opening: 1972
- Owner: Rockefeller Group (Mitsubishi Estate)

Height
- Roof: 674 feet (205 m)
- Top floor: 640 feet (200 m)

Technical details
- Floor count: 51
- Floor area: 2,199,982 sq ft (204,385 m^{2})
- Lifts/elevators: 36

Design and construction
- Architect: Wallace Harrison

1221 Avenue of the Americas (formerly also known as the McGraw-Hill Building) is an international-style skyscraper at 1221 Sixth Avenue (also known as the Avenue of the Americas) in Midtown Manhattan, New York City. The 51-floor structure has a seven-story base and a simple, cuboid massing. The facade has no decoration and consists of red granite piers alternating with glass stripes to underline the tower's verticality. It served as the headquarters of McGraw Hill Financial from 1972 to 2015.

The building is set back 115 feet (35 m) from Sixth Avenue. Its sunken courtyard formerly contained Sun Triangle, a 49-foot (15 m) abstract steel sculpture by Athelstan Spilhaus. The tower's lobby is clad in dark red terrazzo and red marble, with aphorisms by Plato and John F. Kennedy.

== Background ==
Buildings of Rockefeller Center
Buildings and structures in Rockefeller Center:
1 1 Rockefeller Plaza
2 10 Rockefeller Plaza
3 La Maison Francaise
4 British Empire Building
5 30 Rockefeller Plaza
6 International Building
7 50 Rockefeller Plaza
8 1230 Avenue of the Americas
9 Radio City Music Hall
10 1270 Avenue of the Americas
11 75 Rockefeller Plaza
12 600 Fifth Avenue
13 608 Fifth Avenue
14 1271 Avenue of the Americas
15 1251 Avenue of the Americas
16 1221 Avenue of the Americas
17 1211 Avenue of the Americas

The building was part of the later Rockefeller Center expansion (1960s–1970s) dubbed the "XYZ Buildings". Their plans were first drawn in 1963 by the Rockefeller family's architect, Wallace Harrison, of the architectural firm Harrison & Abramovitz. Their letters correspond to their height. 1251 Avenue of the Americas is the "X" Building as it is the tallest at 750 ft (229 m) and 54 stories, and was the first completed, in 1971. The "Y" is 1221 Avenue of the Americas, which was the second tower completed (1973) and is the second in height (674 ft and 51 stories). The "Z" Building, the shortest and the youngest, is 1211 Avenue of the Americas with 45 stories (592 ft).

The building houses the New York practice of professional services and accountancy firm Deloitte and was previously the headquarters of McGraw-Hill Financial. Other tenants include Sirius XM Satellite Radio, whose headquarters and broadcast facility are in the building, and the law firms Mayer Brown and White & Case.

In December 2016, CPPIB sold a 45% stake in the building to CIC for $1 billion, which valued it at $2.3 billion.

In 2009, the structure earned a LEED green-building certification. A renovation of the plaza and retail space was announced in 2017, and the $50 million project was underway by 2022.

The sunken plaza is a privately owned public space that had a special waiver to the setback rule and the rule that prohibited plazas of more than 12 feet below the street level. The sunken plaza formerly contained a 49-foot-tall (15 m) metal triangle designed by Athelstan Spilhaus and fabricated by Tyler Elevator Products, arranged so the Sun aligns with its sides at solstices and equinoxes. 1221 Avenue of the Americas' entrance plaza, on Sixth Avenue, was renovated in 2023 at a cost of $50 million.

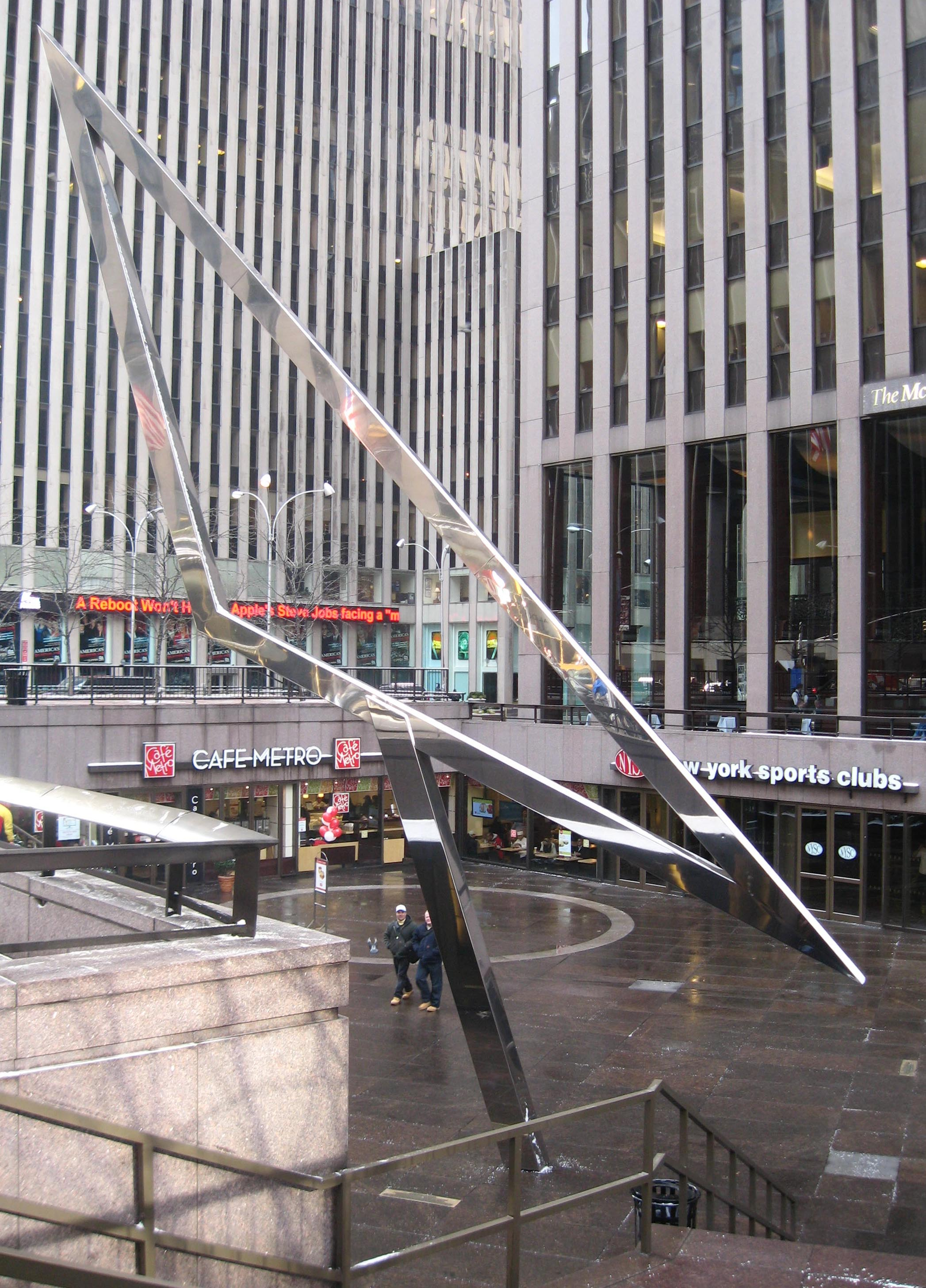
Sunken courtyard

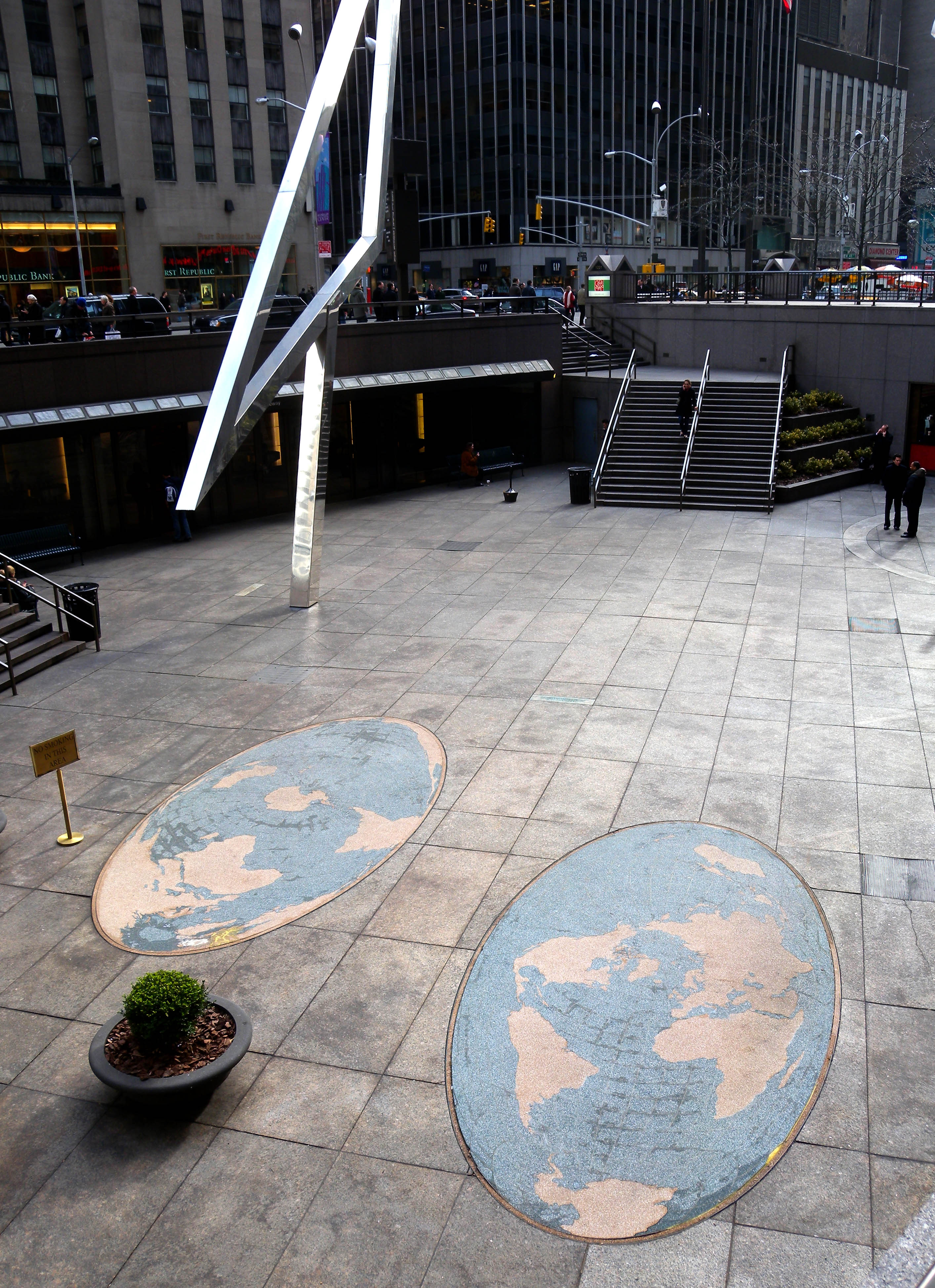
World maps and sculpture Sun Triangle

== 1999 elevator incident ==
After entering an express elevator serving floors 39–50 at approximately 11:00 p.m. (EDT) Friday on October 15, 1999, Nicholas White, a Business Week employee whose office was in the building, became trapped in an elevator after a brief power dip caused it to stop between the 13th and 14th floors. White was not rescued until approximately 4:00 p.m. on Sunday, October 17, nearly 41 hours later, after security guards spotted him in the elevator surveillance cameras. In 2008, The New Yorker uploaded a video, originally called "Trapped in an Elevator for 41 Hours", which contained surveillance-camera footage of White being trapped in the elevator. White filed a lawsuit against the building's management and elevator maintenance company for negligence as he remained unnoticed for a majority of the time despite attempting to use the intercom and maintenance being performed on other elevators that weekend; he settled 4 years later for an undisclosed sum, hinting "hardly six figures".

== In popular culture ==
The buildings are featured in the title sequence of Saturday Night Live, seen from below looking up in the street from a car. It was used for the exteriors and lobby of Elias-Clarke's headquarters in the 2006 film The Devil Wears Prada. The building appeared as interior shots for the television show Suits. It is also the headquarters of Sirius XM Radio, and many radio shows broadcast from the building including The Howard Stern Show. The plaza and sculpture are also featured as part of the New York City Level of the video game Tony Hawk's Pro Skater 2.

The Devil Wears Prada 2 again filmed in NYC at 1221 Avenue of the Americas for the fictional "Runway Magazine" offices, drawing fans and paparazzi to the streets in July 2025 to watch the actors exit the building lobby and wave from the windows of Quorum by Convene, a real-life meeting and event space managed by corporate event producers, Convene, and available for private events when not used as a conference space for White & Case. The Devil Wears Prada 2, released in 2026, showed a brief scene with Anne Hathaway's character Andy taking notes in front of the 270-degree screen inside the Quorum by Convene Grand Hall and transformed the venue's "huge light-filled" Grand Gallery into a cafeteria with cash registers and grab-and-go snacks, where Stanley Tucci's character Nigel teases Andy for still liking the soup.

== See also ==
- List of tallest buildings in New York City
