= Wallace Harrison =

American architect (1895–1981)

- Born: Wallace Kirkman Harrison; September 28, 1895; Worcester, Massachusetts, U.S.
- Died: December 2, 1981 (aged 86); New York City, U.S.
- Education: École des Beaux-Arts
- Occupation: Architect
- Awards: AIA Gold Medal (1967)
- Practice: Harrison & Abramowitz
- Buildings: United Nations headquarters Exxon Building
- Projects: Rockefeller Center; Lincoln Center for the Performing Arts
- Design: Trylon and Perisphere

Wallace Kirkman Harrison (September 28, 1895 – December 2, 1981) was an American architect. Harrison started his professional career with the firm of Corbett, Harrison & MacMurray, participating in the construction of Rockefeller Center. He is best known for executing large public projects in New York City and upstate, many of them the fruit of his long friendship with Governor Nelson Rockefeller.

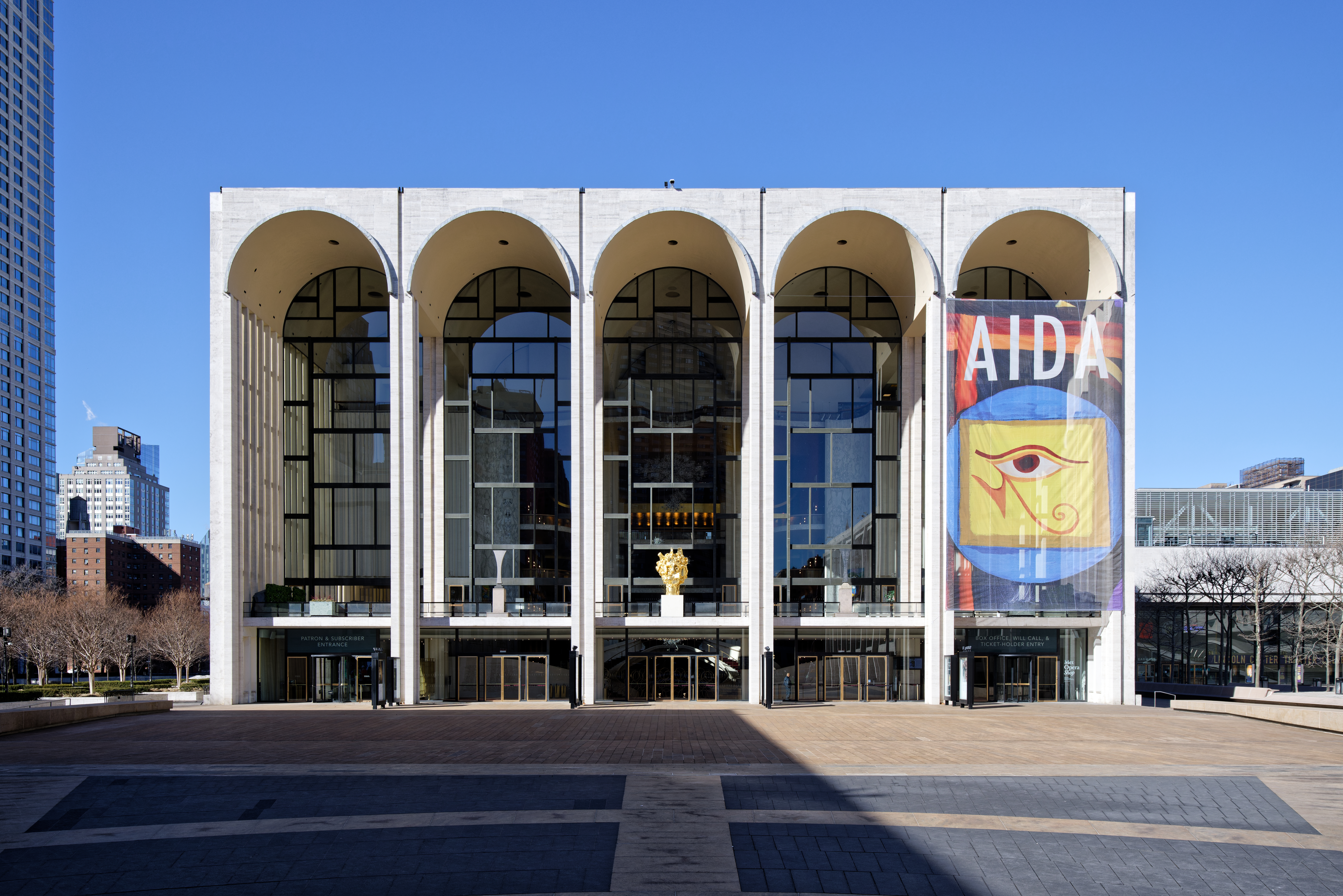
The Metropolitan Opera House at Lincoln Center for the Performing Arts, seen from Lincoln Center Plaza

== Early life and education ==
Harrison was born in Worcester, Massachusetts, on September 28, 1895. He studied engineering at Worcester Polytechnic Institute and architecture at the Boston Architectural Club. In the 1920s, he attended École des Beaux-Arts and, two years later, won the Rotch Taveling Scholarship in 1922.

== Career ==
Harrison's work in the mid-20th century comprised large, modernist public projects and office buildings. He worked for McKim, Mead & White and Bertram Grovesnor Goodhue from 1916 to 1923, and later formed a series of architectural partnerships. Harrison participated with the architectural teams involved in the construction of Rockefeller Center in New York City, completed in 1939. His brother-in-law was married to John D. Rockefeller Jr.'s daughter, Abigail and Harrison served as a designer and architectural adviser for Nelson Rockefeller, notably in the years when Rockefeller was governor of New York.

In 1941, Harrison joined with Max Abramowitz to form the firm of Harrison & Abramowitz. In partnership with Abramovitz, Harrison designed scores of university and corporate buildings, as well as churches: including: The First Presbyterian Church (”The Fish Church”), Stamford, Connecticut, (1958), the Time & Life (1959) and Socony-Mobil (1956), both designated New York City landmarks.

Among Harrison's most noted projects are the Metropolitan Opera House at the Lincoln Center for the Performing Arts and the Empire State Plaza in Albany, New York. He also served as Director of Planning on the United Nations complex, which was built on slaughter house property contributed by the Rockefeller family (the Rockefellers owned the Tudor City Apartments across First Avenue). Harrision developed the design for the Pershing Memorial in Washington, D.C., which is now home to the National World War I Memorial. In addition to his architectural work, Harrison served as master planner and supervising architect for a number of important Long Island-based projects, including the World's Fairs of 1939 and 1964 in Flushing, Queens, and LaGuardia and Idlewild (now John F. Kennedy) airports.

Harrison's major projects are marked by straightforward planning and sensible functionalism, although his residential side-projects show more experimental flair. In 1931, Harrison established an 11-acre (4.5 ha) summer retreat in West Hills, New York, which was a very early example and workshop for the International Style in the United States, and a social and intellectual center of architecture, art, and politics. The home includes a 32-foot (9.8 m) circular living room that is rumored to have been the prototype for the Rainbow Room in Rockefeller Center. Two other circular rooms complete the center of Harrison's design. Frequent visitors and guests included Nelson Rockefeller, Robert Moses, Marc Chagall, Le Corbusier, Alexander Calder, and Fernand Léger. Harrison's expansive country property also exhibited his relationships with contemporary architects. For example, shortly after purchasing the property in 1931, Harrison and his wife bought the Aluminaire House, an iconic, compact, ready-to-assemble steel-and-aluminum structure designed by Swiss architect Albert Frey and then editor of Architectural Record, A. Lawrence Kocher.

Harrison collected works by Calder and Léger and commissioned new ones for buildings that he designed, including his country house in West Hills, New York on Long Island, a pavilion at the 1939 New York World's Fair, parts of Rockefeller Center; and the United Nations headquarters. Léger waited out part of World War II by painting a mural at the bottom of Harrison's swimming pool. Léger also created a large mural for the home's circular living room and sculpted an abstract form to serve as a skylight. Calder's first show is said to have taken place at the home. In 1965, Harrison was appointed to a commission to choose modern art works for the Governor Nelson A. Rockefeller Empire State Plaza Art Collection in Albany, NY.

Between 1941 and 1943, Harrison designed and built the Clinton Hill Coops, a 12-building coop complex split between two campuses along Clinton Ave. in Brooklyn, to house the Brooklyn Navy Yards workers.

Harrison's architectural drawings and archives are held by the Drawings and Archives Department of Avery Architectural and Fine Arts Library at Columbia University.

Harrison was a member of the United States Commission of Fine Arts from 1955 to 1959. In 1967, Harrison received the AIA Gold Medal. In 1938, he was elected into the National Academy of Design as an Associate member, and became a full Academician in 1948.

== Personal life ==
Harrison married Ellen Hunt Milton (1903–1995) in 1926. They had a daughter, and lived in Manhattan and Seal Harbor, Maine.

== Major projects ==
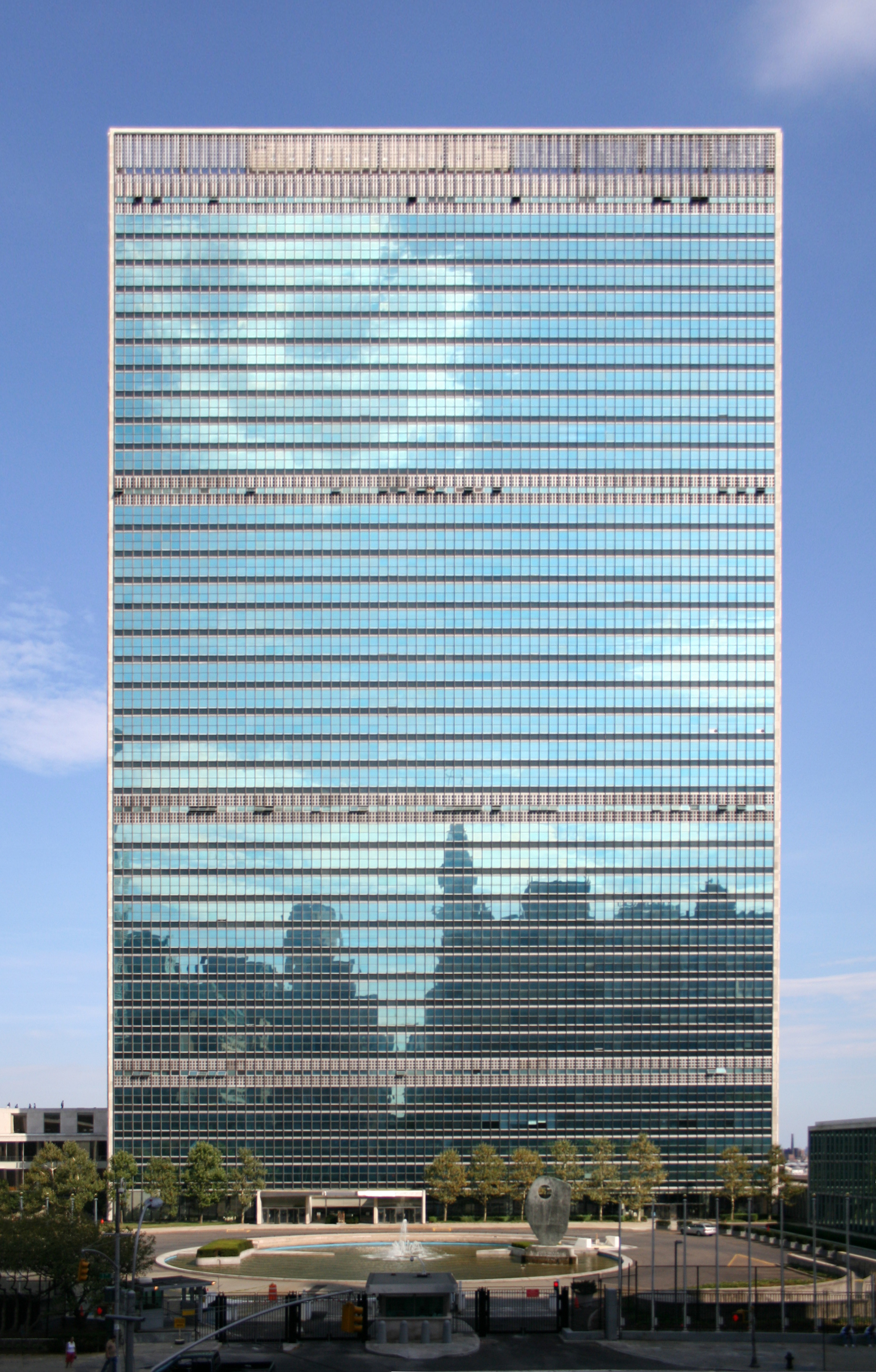
United Nations Secretariat Building at the headquarters of the United Nations in New York City

- 185 Montague Street (1929–1930)
- Rockefeller Center, part of the Associated Architects, 1931–1971
- The Rockefeller Apartments (with J. André Fouilhoux), commissioned by Nelson Rockefeller, facing the Museum of Modern Art Sculpture Garden, 1936
- Trylon and Perisphere for the 1939 New York World's Fair
- 10 Rockefeller Plaza (formerly the Eastern Airlines Building), part of Rockefeller Center, 1939
- The Clinton Hill Co-ops, Brooklyn, New York, 1941–43
- The Corning Museum of Glass, Corning, New York, 1951
- Sophronia Brooks Hall Auditorium, Oberlin, Ohio, 1953
- The First Presbyterian Church ("The Fish Church"), Stamford, Connecticut, 1958
- 1271 Avenue of the Americas (formerly the Time-Life Building) at Rockefeller Center, New York City, 1959
- The Nelson A. Rockefeller Empire State Plaza, Albany, New York, his last major project, 1959–1976
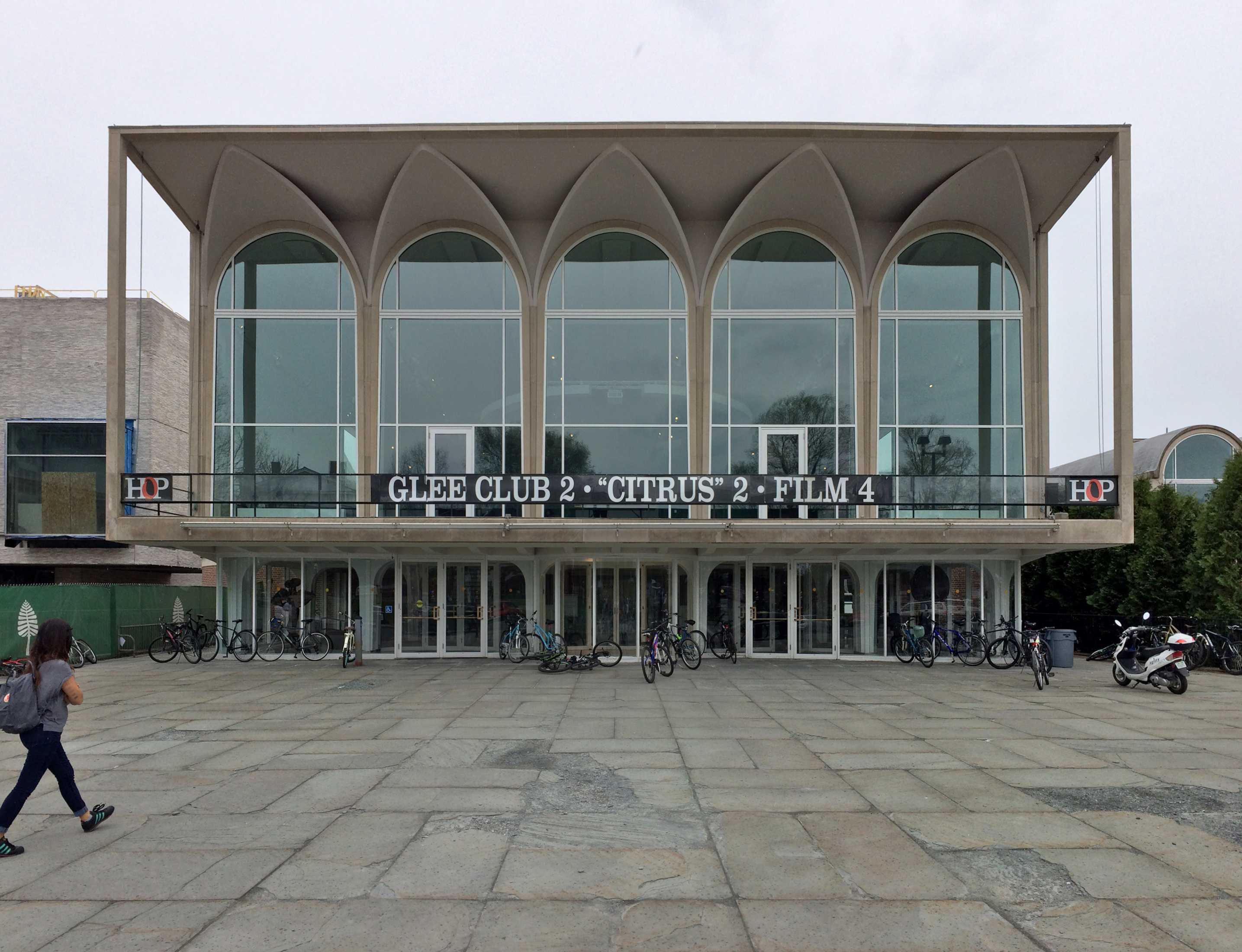
- Hopkins Center for the Arts at Dartmouth College
  Hopkins Center for the Arts, Dartmouth College, whose details foreshadow the Metropolitan Opera House, 1962
- Lead architect for the headquarters of the United Nations (including United Nations Secretariat Building, United Nations General Assembly Building, and Dag Hammarskjöld Library), coordinating the work of an international cadre of designers, including Sven Markelius, Le Corbusier, and Oscar Niemeyer, 1952
- Erieview Tower, Cleveland, Ohio, 1963
- The New York Hall of Science at the 1964 New York World's Fair, New York City, 1964
- Air traffic control tower, LaGuardia Airport (1964) (demolished 2011)
- Hilles Library, Harvard University, 1965
- Metropolitan Opera House and the master plan for Lincoln Center for the Performing Arts, coordinating the work of Pietro Belluschi, Gordon Bunshaft, Philip Johnson, and Eero Saarinen, 1961–1966 (The Opera House opened in 1966)
- Master plan for Battery Park City, New York City, 1966
- 1221 Avenue of the Americas (formerly the McGraw-Hill Building) at Rockefeller Center, 1969
- 1251 Avenue of the Americas (formerly the Exxon Building) at Rockefeller Center, 1971
- The National City Tower, Louisville, Kentucky, 1972
- Jasna Polana Mansion, Princeton, New Jersey, about 1975

== See also ==
- Nelson Rockefeller
- Rockefeller Center
- Lincoln Center
