= 50 Rockefeller Plaza =

Building in Manhattan, New York

Coordinates: 40.7595°N 73.9785°W

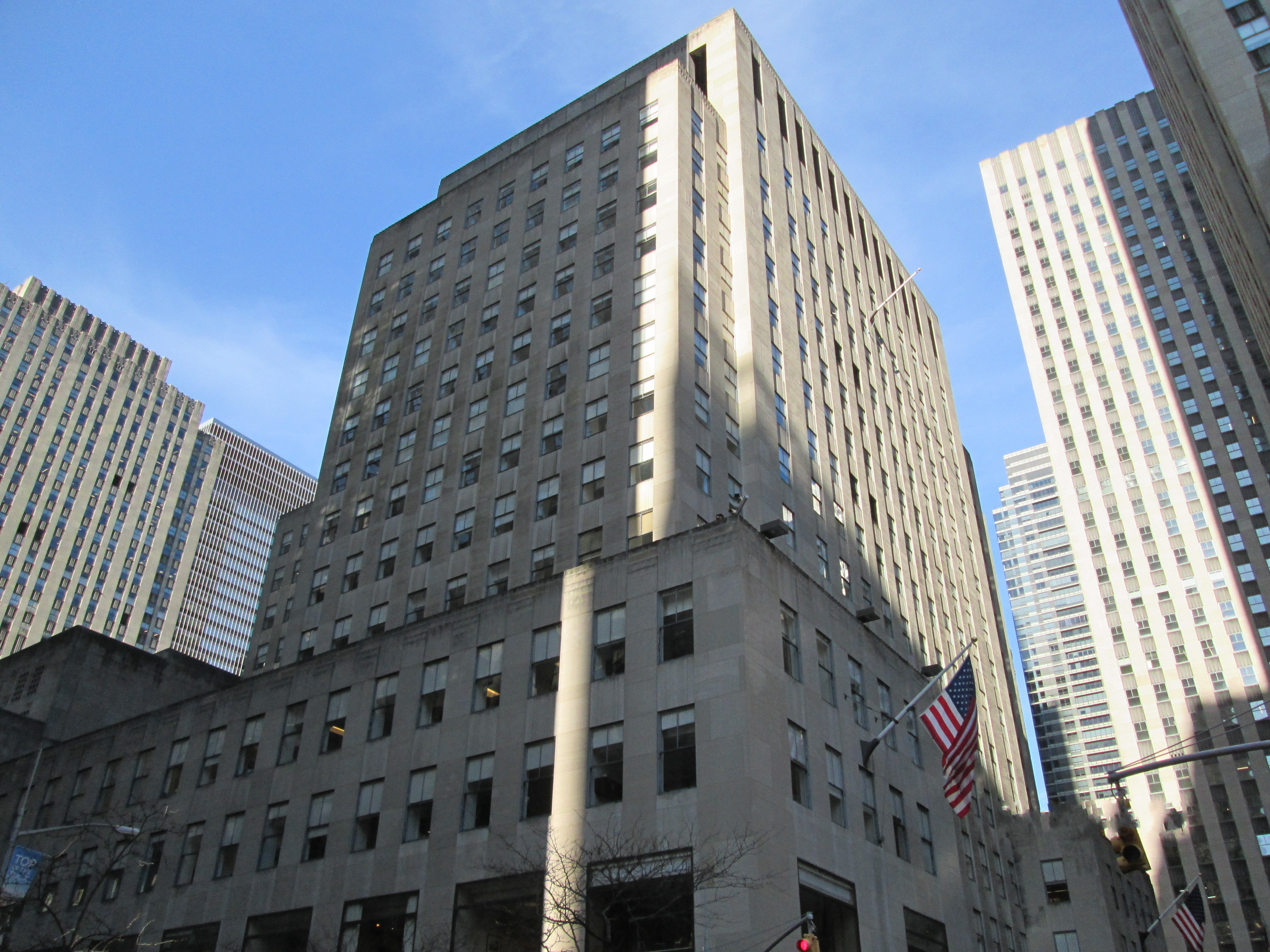
50 Rockefeller Plaza

50 Rockefeller Plaza (formerly the Associated Press Building from 1938 to 2004) is a 15-story building located at Rockefeller Plaza between 50th and 51st Streets in Midtown Manhattan, New York City. Completed in 1938, the building is part of Rockefeller Center and, like the rest of the complex, was built in the Art Deco style.

== History ==
Buildings of Rockefeller Center
Buildings and structures in Rockefeller Center:
1 1 Rockefeller Plaza
2 10 Rockefeller Plaza
3 La Maison Francaise
4 British Empire Building
5 30 Rockefeller Plaza
6 International Building
7 50 Rockefeller Plaza
8 1230 Avenue of the Americas
9 Radio City Music Hall
10 1270 Avenue of the Americas
11 75 Rockefeller Plaza
12 600 Fifth Avenue
13 608 Fifth Avenue
14 1271 Avenue of the Americas
15 1251 Avenue of the Americas
16 1221 Avenue of the Americas
17 1211 Avenue of the Americas

Rockefeller Center occupies three blocks in Midtown Manhattan bounded by Fifth and Sixth Avenues to the east and west, between 48th Street to the south and 51st Street to the north. By 1936, most of the complex had been completed. Rockefeller Center Inc. only needed to develop three empty plots in the middle of the complex's northern and southern blocks.

Rockefeller Center's executives went into talks with the Associated Press for a building on the northern empty lot, which was occupied by the complex's truck delivery ramp. The lot had also been planned as a hotel site, but this was also deemed economically infeasible. In January 1938, the Associated Press agreed to rent the fourth through seventh floors of the structure, with the building to be named for the company.

Construction of the steelwork started in April 1938, and after 29 working days, it was topped out by June. The Associated Press moved into the structure in December. The building, located at 50 Rockefeller Plaza, was built to the outer limits of its lot without any setbacks or rooftop gardens; it rose only 15 floors because of the 1916 zoning law and the paucity of other tenants. The presence of the Associated Press and Time Inc. expanded Rockefeller Center's scope from strictly a radio-communications complex to a hub of both radio and print media. In 1938, the Associated Press opened the Guild, a newsreel theater, along the curve of the truck ramp below the building.

The AP announced plans in 2003 to relocate, as it did not wish to renew its expiring lease at 50 Rockefeller Plaza, and it subsequently moved to Manhattan West on 33rd Street. In the late 2010s and early 2020s, Studio Mellone renovated the lobby of 50 Rockefeller Plaza. The lobby received black-terrazzo floors with brass detail; several pieces of artwork; curved limestone walls; and bronzed-steel urns.

== Description ==
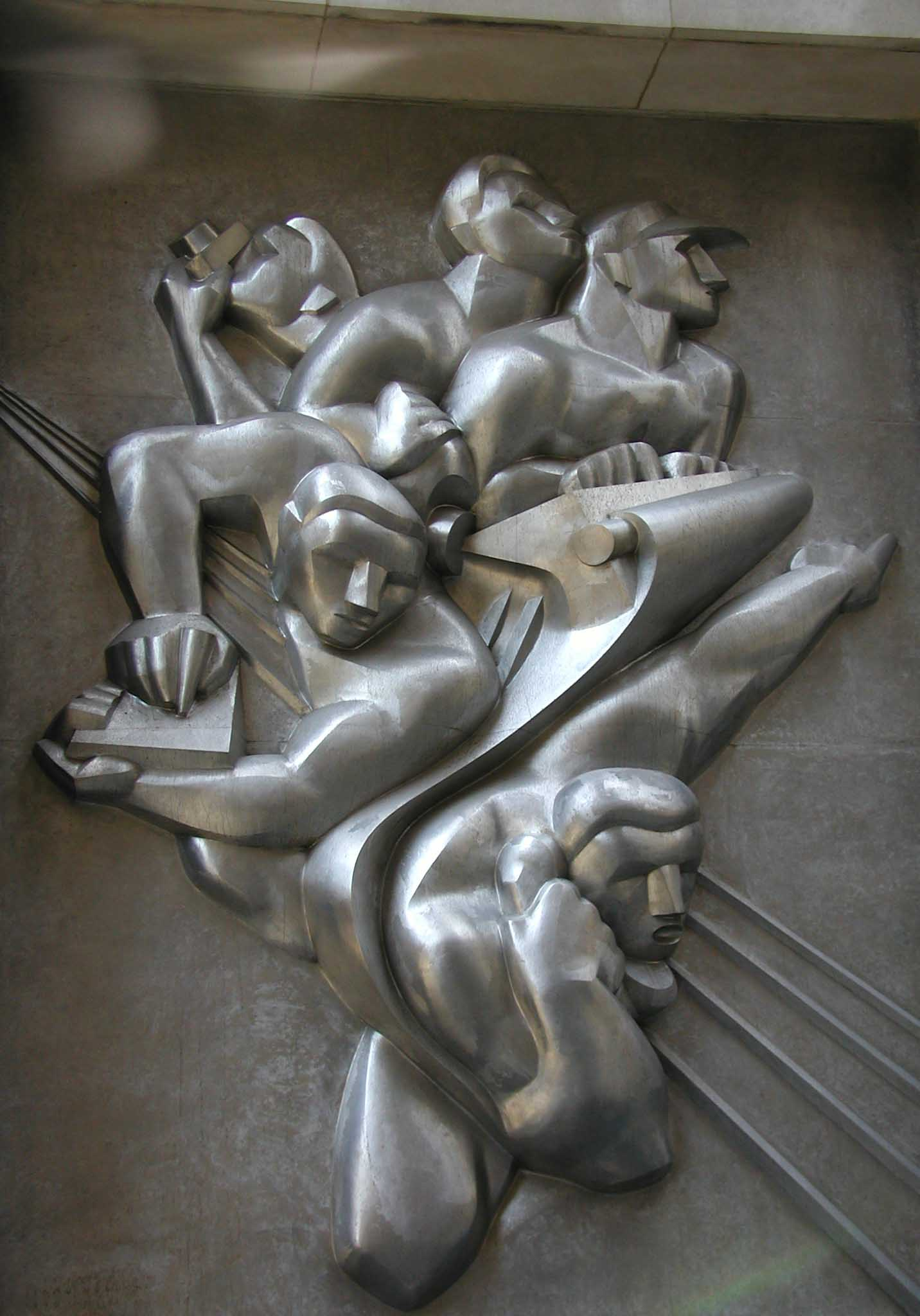
News by Isamu Noguchi

50 Rockefeller Plaza is located on the west side of Rockefeller Plaza between 50th and 51st Streets. The only building in the Center built to the outer limits of its lot line, the 15-story building took its shape from the Associated Press's need for a single, undivided, loft-like newsroom as large as the lot could accommodate—namely, a 200-by-187-foot (61 by 57 m) blocky structure with no setbacks. At one point, 4,000,000 feet (1,200,000 m) of transmission wire were embedded in conduits on the building's fourth floor. The complex's truck ramp descends under the building from 50th Street, while the rear of the building is located next to the Radio City Music Hall. The building also contained the Guild Theater, a 450-seat newsreel theater, from 1938 to 1999.

Isamu Noguchi's 10-short-ton (8.9-long-ton) stainless steel panel, News, is located above the building's entrance. His work, which depicts the various forms of communications used by journalists in the 1930s, honors the different occupations in the news industry. It is one of Noguchi's last abstract works as well as the only stainless steel work he ever commissioned.

== Sources ==
1. Adams, Janet (1985). "Rockefeller Center Designation Report" (PDF). City of New York; New York City Landmarks Preservation Commission. Archived from the original (PDF) on 2017-11-07.
2. Balfour, Alan (1978). Rockefeller Center: Architecture as Theater. McGraw-Hill, Inc. ISBN 978-0070034808.
3. Krinsky, Carol H. (1978). Rockefeller Center. Oxford University Press. ISBN 978-0-19-502404-3.
4. Okrent, Daniel (2003). Great Fortune: The Epic of Rockefeller Center. Penguin Books. ISBN 978-0142001776.
5. Roussel, Christine (May 17, 2006). The Art of Rockefeller Center. New York: W.W. Norton & Company. ISBN 978-0-3930-6082-9.
