= 1251 Avenue of the Americas =

Office skyscraper in Manhattan, New York

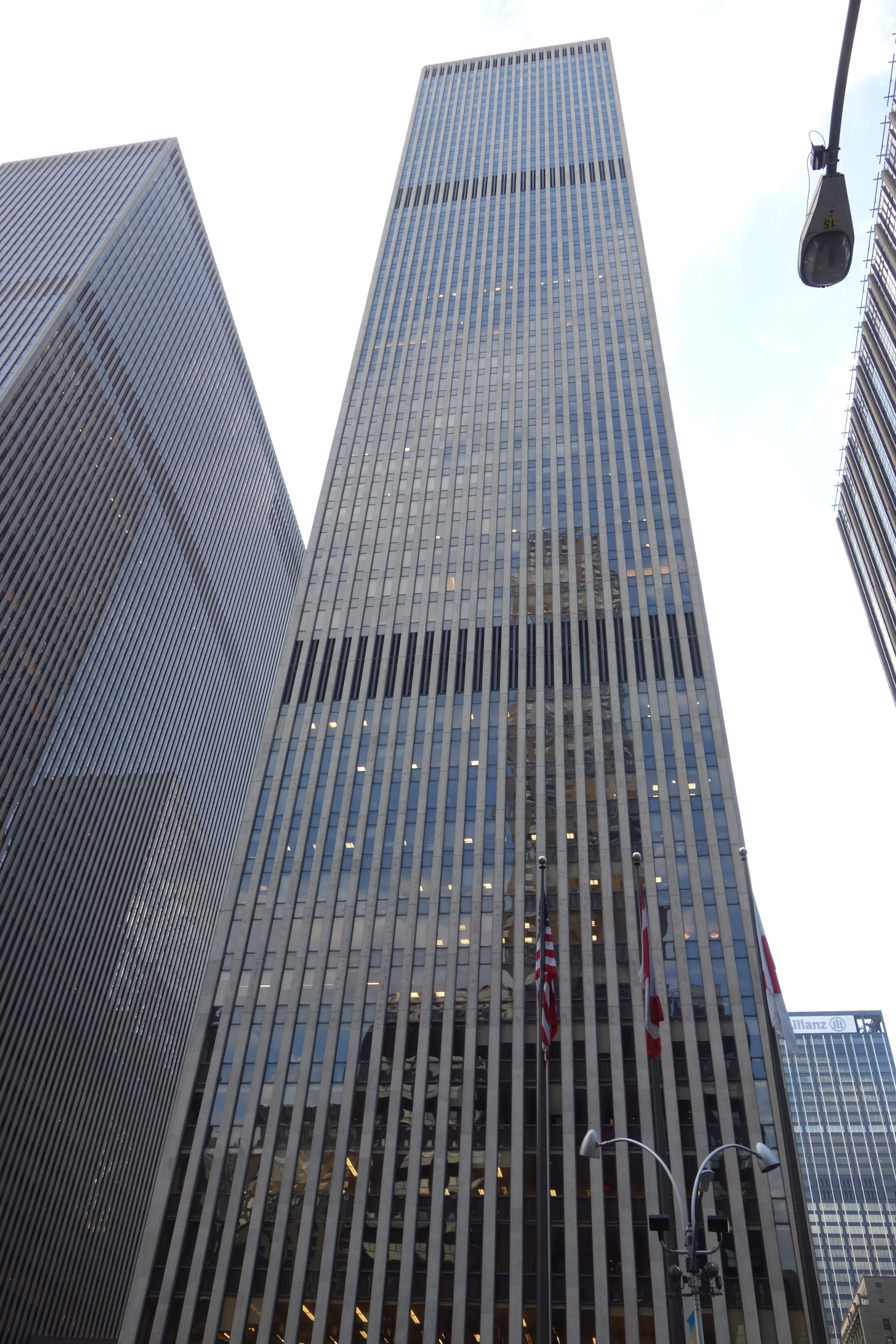
- The base of 1251 Avenue of the Americas
- Former names: Exxon Building

General information
- Status: Completed
- Type: Office
- Architectural style: New Formalism
- Location: 1251 Avenue of the Americas, New York City, New York, U.S.
- Coordinates: 40°45′36″N 73°58′53″W
- Construction started: 1965
- Completed: 1968
- Opening: 1971
- Owner: Mitsui Fudosan

Height
- Roof: 750 feet (230 m)
- Top floor: 715 feet (218 m)

Technical details
- Floor count: 54
- Floor area: 2,101,115 sq ft (195,200 m^{2})
- Lifts/elevators: 36

Design and construction
- Architect: Wallace Harrison
- Structural engineer: Edwards & Hjorth
- Main contractor: George A. Fuller Co.

1251 Avenue of the Americas (formerly known as the Exxon Building) is a skyscraper on Sixth Avenue (also known as Avenue of the Americas), between 49th and 50th Streets, in the Midtown Manhattan neighborhood of New York City. It is owned by Mitsui Fudosan. The structure is built in the international style and looks like a simple cuboid devoid of any ornamentation. The facade consists of alternating narrow, vertical stripes of glass and limestone. The glass stripes are created by windows and opaque spandrels, forming continuous areas that are washed by machines sliding down the facade. A seven-floor base wraps around the western portion of the building, and there is a sunken plaza with a large two-tier pool and fountains facing Sixth Avenue. In the plaza stands the bronze statue named Out to Lunch by John Seward Johnson II—of the same series as the one that once stood outside 270 Park Avenue.

Buildings of Rockefeller Center
Buildings and structures in Rockefeller Center:
1 1 Rockefeller Plaza
2 10 Rockefeller Plaza
3 La Maison Francaise
4 British Empire Building
5 30 Rockefeller Plaza
6 International Building
7 50 Rockefeller Plaza
8 1230 Avenue of the Americas
9 Radio City Music Hall
10 1270 Avenue of the Americas
11 75 Rockefeller Plaza
12 600 Fifth Avenue
13 608 Fifth Avenue
14 1271 Avenue of the Americas
15 1251 Avenue of the Americas
16 1221 Avenue of the Americas
17 1211 Avenue of the Americas

== History ==
The building was part of the later Rockefeller Center expansion (1960s–1970s) dubbed the "XYZ Buildings". Their plans were first drawn in 1963 by the Rockefeller family's architect, Wallace Harrison, of the architectural firm Harrison & Abramovitz. 1251 Avenue of the Americas is the "X" Building as it is the tallest at 750 ft (229 m) and 54 stories, and was the first completed, in 1971. The "Y" is 1221 Avenue of the Americas, which was the second tower completed (1973) and is the second in height (674 ft and 51 stories). The "Z" Building, the shortest and the youngest, is 1211 Avenue of the Americas with 45 stories (592 ft). 1251 is the second-tallest building in the whole of Rockefeller Center, after 30 Rockefeller Plaza.

Despite being one of the 100 tallest buildings in the United States, 1251 Avenue of the Americas is almost impossible to see from more than just a few blocks away as it is flanked on all sides by buildings over 500 feet tall. The result is that even though 1251 Avenue of the Americas is approximately as tall as the tallest buildings in cities such as Boston or Minneapolis, it has almost no presence on the New York City skyline.

In 1989, Exxon announced that it was moving its headquarters and around 300 employees from New York City to the Las Colinas area of Irving, Texas. Exxon sold the Exxon Building, its former headquarters, to a unit of Mitsui Real Estate Development Co. Ltd. in 1986 for $610 million. John Walsh, president of Exxon subsidiary Friendswood Development Company, stated that Exxon left New York because the costs were too high. Its New York offices moved to Brooklyn; it no longer retains a presence in Rockefeller Center.

In May 2013, the structure received silver certification under the U.S. Green Building Council's LEED for Existing Buildings Rating System.

== Art ==
Artist-authorized replica of Pablo Picasso's tapestry for the ballet Mercure

Inside, on the western end of 1251's atrium hangs an artist-authorized replica of a tapestry Pablo Picasso created for the ballet Mercure, the original of which hangs in the Musée National d'Art Moderne in Paris, France. It was created specifically for the building, as per the plaque beneath it.

== See also ==
- List of tallest buildings in New York City
