= Fritz Glarner =

Swiss-American painter

Fritz Glarner (July 20, 1899 – September 18, 1972) was a Swiss-American painter. He was a proponent of Concrete Art movement and a disciple of Piet Mondrian.

== Work ==
Glarner was a leading proponent of so-called Concrete Art, an artists' movement whose roots lead back to the painters of De Stijl and the principles of the Bauhaus. He was a disciple of Piet Mondrian, strongly influenced by Mondrian's theories of "dynamic symmetry". As he developed as an artist, his works began to be increasingly influenced by Mondrian's Neoplastic theory. His leaning toward nonrepresentational art had begun as early as 1929 in Paris, where he was a member of the Abstraction-Création group. Glarner took up Mondrian's motif of arranging simplified colors and forms on an architectural pattern. Glarner introduced a diagonal into the strict horizontal and vertical geometric aesthetic of Mondrian, creating new, yet equally systematic principles of composition that he termed "relational painting."

Like Mondrian, Glarner limited his color palette to the primaries, red, yellow and blue. He expanded Mondrian's black "line" into a broad range of grays, used both as line and, like the primaries, as geometric areas of color. Many of his works are tondos, his signature relational principles ordered within a circle. Glarner's additions and alterations in structure and color to the Mondrian style gave his works a vitality and spatial dimensions. 24 of his works are owned by Museo Cantonale d’Arte of Lugano, Switzerland. A mural by Glarner is included in The Governor Nelson A. Rockefeller Empire State Plaza Art Collection in Albany, New York.

== Biography ==
Although Glarner was Swiss, born in Zurich, and kept close ties to his home country, he lived most of his life as an expatriate. He spent his childhood and youth in Italy and France. He studied and worked in Paris from 1923 to 1935. Glarner emigrated to the United States in 1936, living and working first in Manhattan and later at a studio and residence on Long Island. In 1966 he was gravely injured in rough seas on an ocean liner crossing from Europe to America. He returned to Switzerland in 1971, taking residence in Locarno. He died the next year in Locarno.
