= Florence Fabricant =

American cookbook writer

- Born: United States
- Education: Smith College; New York University Graduate School of Arts and Science (MA)
- Occupation: Food critic

Florence Fabricant is an American food critic and food writer. She has authored multiple cookbooks and has regularly contributed to The New York Times since 1980. Fabricant lives in Manhattan, New York and East Hampton, New York.

== Early life ==
Fabricant received her undergraduate degree from Smith College. She received an M.A. degree in French from New York University Graduate School of Arts and Sciences in 1962.

== Career ==
In 1972, Fabricant began her journalistic career, writing for the "In Season" column for The East Hampton Star. That same year, she began contributing to The New York Times. She became a regular Times contributor in 1980. She holds a L'Ordre National du Mérite from the French government.

== Volunteer work ==
Her works with The Society of Memorial Sloan Kettering Cancer Center helped raise money for cancer care, research, and treatment.

== Books ==
In addition to contributing to the restaurant, metro, style and travel sections of the Times, she has published eleven cookbooks:

- Wine with Food: Pairing Notes and Recipes from The New York Times
- Park Avenue Potluck
- Park Avenue Potluck Celebrations: Entertaining at Home with New York's Savviest Hostesses
- The New York Restaurant Cookbook
- The Great Potato Book
- Venetian Taste
- Florence Fabricant's Pleasures of the Table
- New Home Cooking
- The New York Times Dessert Cookbook
- The New York Times Seafood Cookbook
- Elizabeth Berry's Great Bean Book (with Elizabeth Berry)

Patricia Fabricant, her daughter, designed five of her books.
