= Construction of Rockefeller Center =

Construction project in New York City (1931–1974)

Coordinates: 40°45′31″N 73°58′45″W

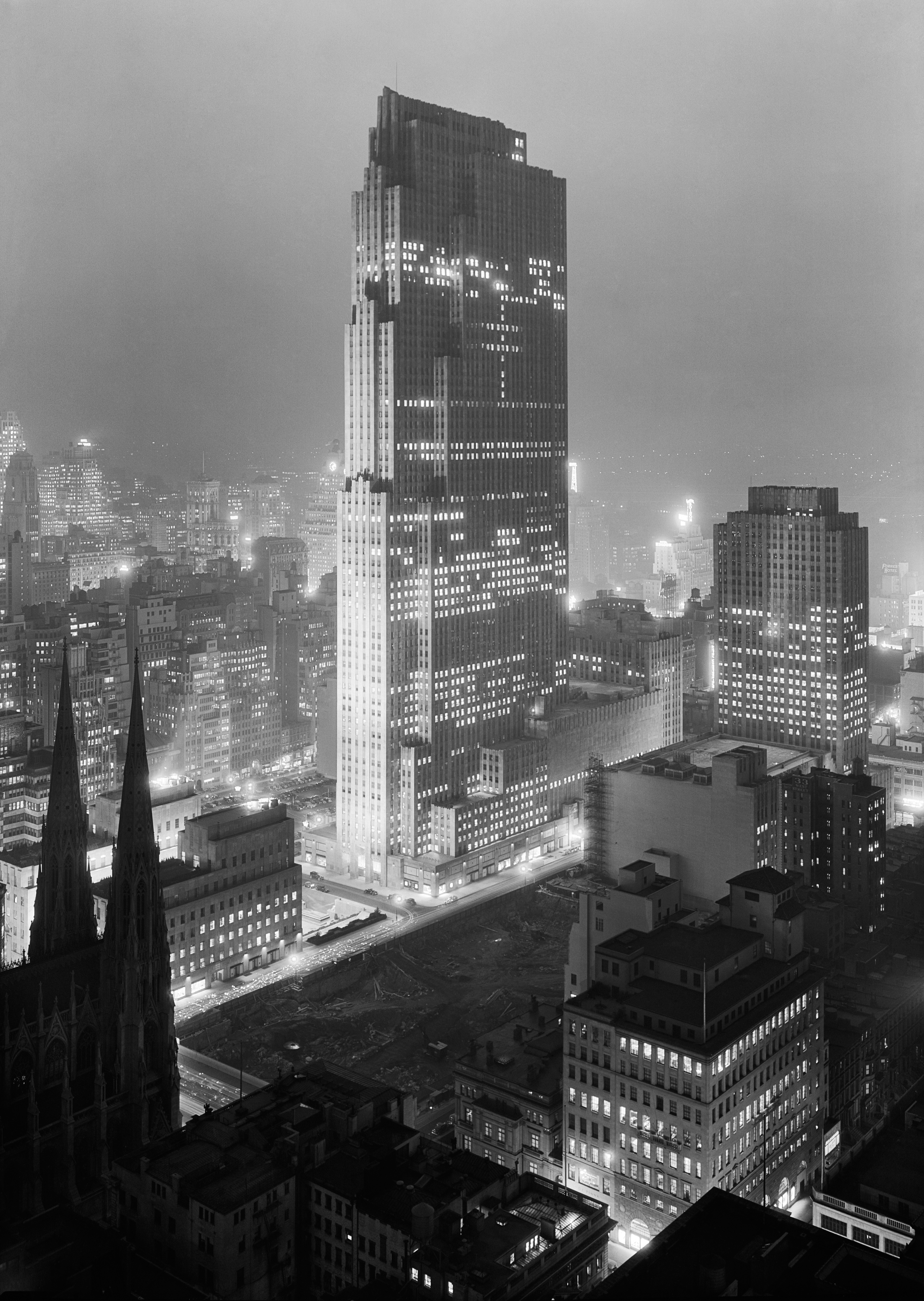
Construction of Rockefeller Center underway in December 1933

The construction of the Rockefeller Center complex in Midtown Manhattan, New York City, United States, was conceived in the late 1920s and led by John D. Rockefeller Jr. Rockefeller Center is on one of Columbia University's former campuses and is bounded by Fifth Avenue to the east, Sixth Avenue (Avenue of the Americas) to the west, 48th Street to the south, and 51st Street to the north. The center occupies 22 acres (8.9 ha) in total, with some 17 million square feet (1.6 million square meters) of office space.

Columbia University had acquired the site in the early 19th century but had moved to Morningside Heights in Upper Manhattan in the early 1900s. By the 1920s, Fifth Avenue in Midtown Manhattan was a prime site for development. Around that time, the Metropolitan Opera (Met) was looking for a new site for their opera house, and architect Benjamin Wistar Morris decided on the former Columbia site.

Rockefeller eventually became involved in the project and leased the Columbia site in 1928 for 87 years. The lease excluded land along the east side of Sixth Avenue to the west of the Rockefeller property, as well as at the site's southeast corner. He hired Todd, Robertson, and Todd as design consultants and selected the architectural firms of Corbett, Harrison & MacMurray, Hood, Godley & Fouilhoux, and Reinhard & Hofmeister for the opera complex. However, the Met was unsure about moving there, and the Wall Street crash of 1929 put an end to the plans. Rockefeller instead entered into negotiations with the Radio Corporation of America (RCA) to create a mass-media complex on the site. A new plan was released in January 1930, and an update to the plan was presented after Rockefeller obtained a lease for the land along Sixth Avenue. Revisions continued until March 1931, when the current site design was unveiled. A late change to the proposal included a complex of internationally themed structures along Fifth Avenue.

All structures in the original complex were designed in the Art Deco architectural style. Excavation of the site started in April 1931, and construction began that September on the first buildings. The first edifice was opened in September 1932, and most of the complex was completed by 1935. The final three buildings were built between 1936 and 1940, although Rockefeller Center was officially completed by November 2, 1939. The construction project employed more than 40,000 people and was considered the largest private construction project at the time. It had cost the equivalent of $1.8 billion in 2024 dollars to construct. Since then, there have been several modifications to the complex. An additional building at 75 Rockefeller Plaza was constructed in 1947, while another at 600 Fifth Avenue was constructed in 1952. Four towers were built along the west side of Sixth Avenue in the 1960s and 1970s, which was the most recent expansion of Rockefeller Center. The Center Theatre from the original complex was demolished in 1954.

== Site ==
Buildings of Rockefeller Center
Buildings and structures in Rockefeller Center:
1 1 Rockefeller Plaza
2 10 Rockefeller Plaza
3 La Maison Francaise
4 British Empire Building
5 30 Rockefeller Plaza
6 International Building
7 50 Rockefeller Plaza
8 1230 Avenue of the Americas
9 Radio City Music Hall
10 1270 Avenue of the Americas
11 75 Rockefeller Plaza
12 600 Fifth Avenue
13 608 Fifth Avenue
14 1271 Avenue of the Americas
15 1251 Avenue of the Americas
16 1221 Avenue of the Americas
17 1211 Avenue of the Americas

In 1686, much of Manhattan, including the future Rockefeller Center site, was established as a "common land" of the city of New York. The land remained in city ownership until 1801, when the physician David Hosack, a member of the New York elite, purchased a parcel of land in what is now Midtown for $5,000, equivalent to $97,000 in 2025 dollars. In terms of the present-day street grid, Hosack's land was bounded by 47th Street on the south, 51st Street on the north, and Fifth Avenue on the east, while the western boundary was slightly east of Sixth Avenue (also known as Avenue of the Americas). At the time, the land was sparsely occupied and consisted mostly of forest. Hosack opened the Elgin Botanic Garden, the country's first public botanical garden, on the site in 1804. The garden would operate until 1811, when Hosack put the land on sale for $100,000 (equivalent to $1,935,000 in 2025). As no one was willing to buy the land, the New York State Legislature eventually bought the land for $75,000 (equivalent to $1,451,000 in 2025).

In 1814, the trustees of Columbia University (then Columbia College) were looking to the state legislature for funds when the legislature unexpectedly gave Hosack's former land to the college instead. The gardens became part of Columbia's "Upper Estate" (as opposed to the "Lower Estate" in Lower Manhattan), on the condition that the college move its entire campus to the Upper Estate by 1827. Although the relocation requirement was repealed in 1819, Columbia's trustees did not see the land as "an attractive or helpful gift", so the college let the gardens deteriorate. The area would not become developed until the 1830s, and the land's value did not increase to any meaningful amount until the late 1850s, when St. Patrick's Cathedral was built nearby, spurring a wave of development in the area. Ironically, the cathedral was built in that location because it faced the Upper Estate gardens. By 1860, the Upper Estate contained four row houses below 49th Street as well as a wooden building across from the cathedral. The surrounding area was underdeveloped, with a potter's field and the railroad lines from Grand Central Depot to the east.

Columbia built a new campus near its Upper Estate in 1856, selling a plot at Fifth Avenue and 48th Street to the St. Nicholas Church to pay for construction. Shortly afterward, Columbia implemented height restrictions that prevented any taller buildings, such as apartment blocks or commercial and industrial buildings, from being built on its property. Narrow brownstone houses and expensive "Vanderbilt Colony" mansions were built on nearby streets, and the area became synonymous with wealth. By 1879, there were brownstones on every one of the 203 plots in the Upper Estate, which were all owned by Columbia.

The construction of the Sixth Avenue elevated line in the 1870s made it easy to access commercial and industrial areas elsewhere in Manhattan. However, the line also drastically reduced property values because the elevated structure obstructed views from adjacent properties, and because the trains on the structure caused noise pollution. Columbia sold the southernmost block of its Midtown property in 1904, using the $3 million from the sale (equivalent to $81.7 million in 2024) to pay for newly acquired land in Morningside Heights even further uptown, to replace its Lower Estate. Simultaneously, the low-lying houses along Fifth Avenue were being replaced with taller commercial developments, and the widening of the avenue between 1909 and 1914 contributed to this transition. Columbia also stopped enforcing its height restriction, which Okrent describes as a tactical mistake for the college because the wave of development along Fifth Avenue caused the Upper Estate to become available for such redevelopment. Since the leases on the Upper Estate row houses were being allowed to expire without renewal, the university's real estate adviser John Tonnele was tasked with finding suitable tenants, who could net the university more profit than what the row houses' occupants were currently paying.

== Early plans ==
=== New Metropolitan Opera House ===
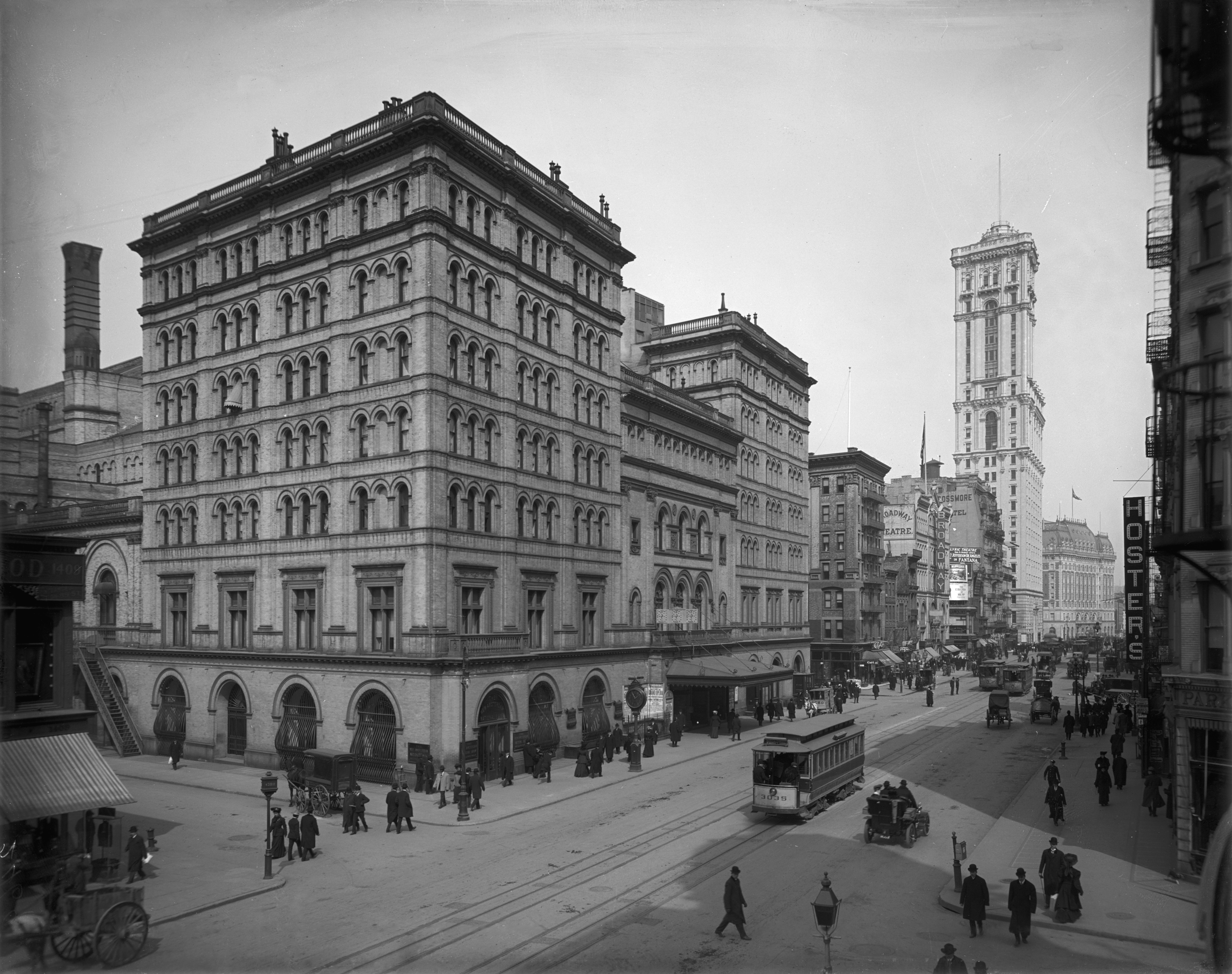
The Rockefeller Center originated as a plan to replace the old Metropolitan Opera Building (pictured).

In 1926, the Metropolitan Opera (Met) started looking for locations to build a new opera house to replace its existing building at 39th Street and Broadway. This was not a new effort, as Otto Kahn, the Met's president, had been seeking to erect a new opera house since he assumed the position in 1908. However, the Met did not itself have money to fund the new facility, and Kahn's efforts to solicit funding from R. Fulton Cutting, the wealthy and influential Cooper Union president, were unsuccessful. Cutting did support the 1926 proposal for a new building, as did William Kissam Vanderbilt. By mid-1927, Kahn had hired architect Benjamin Wistar Morris and designer Joseph Urban to come up with designs for the opera house. They created three designs, all of which the Met rejected.

Kahn wanted the opera house to be on a relatively cheap piece of land near a busy theater and retail area, with access to transportation. In January 1928, Tonnele approached Cutting to propose the Upper Estate as a possible location for the Met. Cutting told of Tonnele's idea to Morris, who thought that the Columbia grounds in Midtown were ideal for the new opera house. By early 1928, Morris had created blueprints for an opera house and a surrounding retail complex at the Upper Estate. However, the new building was too expensive for the Met to fund by itself, and it needed an endowment. On May 21, 1928, Morris presented the project during a dinner for potential investors, at which the Rockefeller family's public relations adviser Ivy Lee was a guest. Lee later informed his boss, John D. Rockefeller Jr., about the proposal, in which the latter showed interest. Rockefeller wished to give the site serious consideration before he invested, and he did not want to fund the entire project on his own. As a result, in August 1928, Rockefeller contacted several firms for advice. Rockefeller ended up hiring the Todd, Robertson and Todd Engineering Corporation as design consultants to determine the project's viability, with one of the firm's partners, John R. Todd, to serve as the principal builder and managing agent for the project. Todd submitted a plan for the opera house site in September 1928, in which he proposed constructing office buildings, department stores, apartment buildings, and hotels around the new opera house.

In June 1928, Charles O. Heydt, one of Rockefeller's business associates, met with Kahn to discuss the proposed opera house. After the meeting, Heydt purchased land just north of the proposed opera house site as per Rockefeller's request, but for a different reason: Rockefeller was afraid that many of the landmarks of his childhood, in the area, were going to be demolished by the 1920s wave of development. The writer Daniel Okrent states that Rockefeller's acquisition of the land might have been more for the family name rather than for the Met proposal itself, as Rockefeller never mentioned the details of the proposal in his daily communications with his father, John D. Rockefeller Sr.

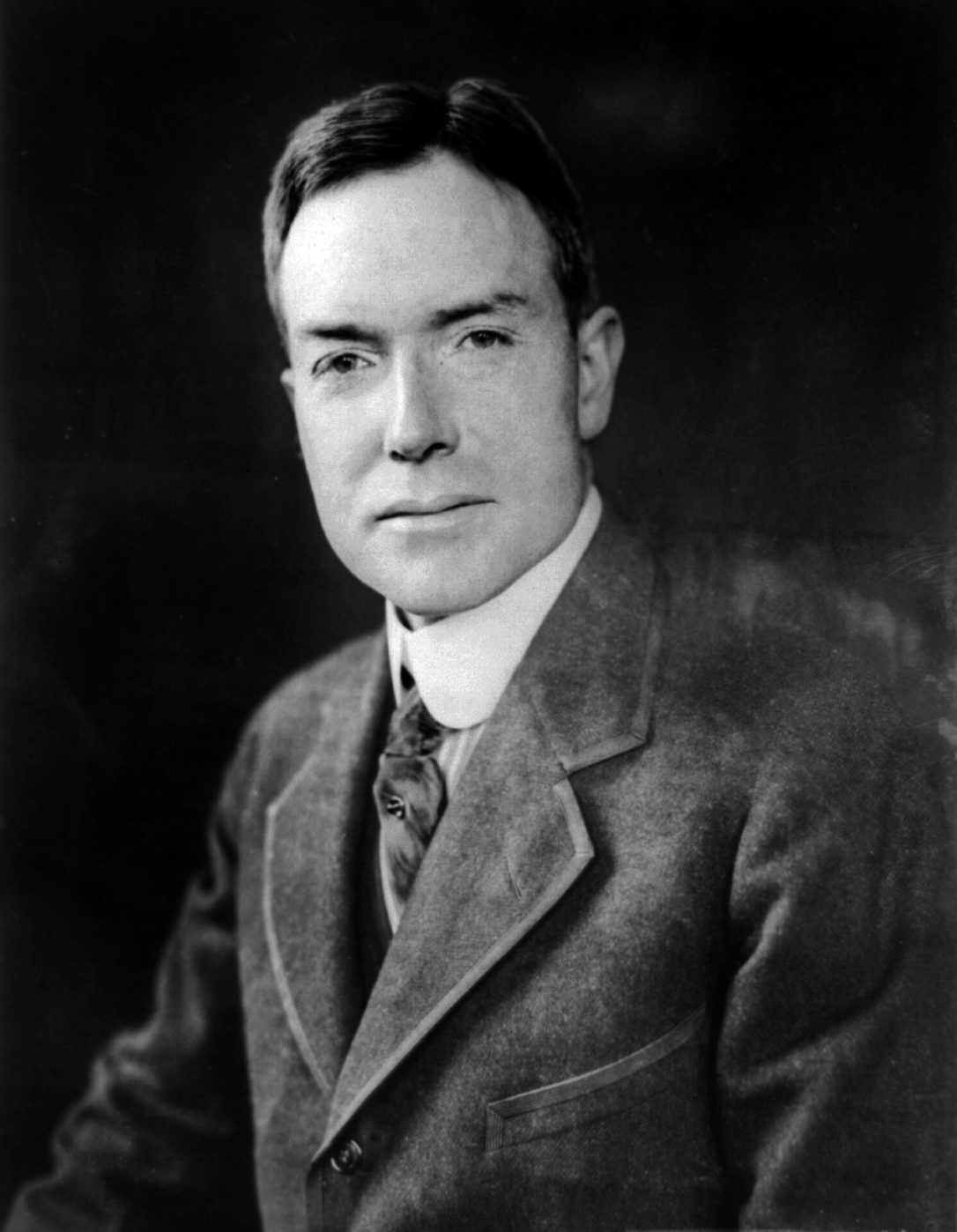
John D. Rockefeller Jr., who funded the Met project

In mid-1928, the Met and Rockefeller were named as prospective buyers for the Columbia site. A lease was agreed to in late 1928 and signed on December 31 of that year. Columbia leased the parcel to Rockefeller for 87 years at a cost of over $3 million per year (equivalent to $43.2 million in 2024), thereby allowing all the existing leases on the site to expire by November 1931 so Rockefeller could purchase them. Rockefeller would pay $3.6 million per year (equivalent to $51.8 million in 2024). In return, he would be entitled to the income from the property, which at the time was about $300,000 annually (equivalent to $4.3 million in 2024). This consisted of a 27-year lease for the site from Columbia, with the option for three 21-year renewals, such that the lease could theoretically last until 2015. (The lease was renewed in 1953 and 1973, and Columbia sold the land to Rockefeller Center Inc. in 1985.) Moreover, Rockefeller could avoid any rent increases for forty-five years, adjusted for inflation. The lease did not include the 100-foot-wide (30 m) strip of land bordering Sixth Avenue on the west side of the parcel, as well as St. Nicholas Church's property on Fifth Avenue between 48th and 49th Streets, and so these were excluded from the plans. Simultaneous with the signing of the lease, the Metropolitan Square Corporation was created to oversee construction.

=== Architects ===
In October 1928, before the lease had been finalized, Rockefeller started asking for recommendations for architects. By the end of the year, Rockefeller hosted a "symposium" of architectural firms so he could solicit plans for the new complex. He invited seven firms, six of which specialized in Beaux-Arts architecture, and asked the noted Beaux-Arts architects John Russell Pope, Cass Gilbert, and Milton B. Medary to judge the proposals. Rockefeller requested that all the plans be submitted by February 1929, and the blueprints were presented in May of that year. All of the proposals called for rentable space of 4 to 5 million square feet (370,000 to 460,000 m^{2}), but these plans were so eccentric that the board rejected all of them. For the time being, Morris was retained until a more suitable architect could be found. However, by the end of 1928, Morris had been fired without pay. He was eventually paid $50,000 for his contributions to the project, and many of his ideas were included in the final design.

Rockefeller retained Todd, Robertson and Todd as the developers of the proposed opera house site; and, as a result, Todd stepped down from the Metropolitan Square Corporation's board of directors. In October 1929, Todd appointed Corbett, Harrison & MacMurray; Hood, Godley & Fouilhoux; and Reinhard & Hofmeister to design the buildings. They worked under the umbrella of "Associated Architects" so that none of the buildings could be attributed to any specific firm. The lead architect and foremost member of the Associated Architects was Raymond Hood, who would become memorable for his creative designs. Hood and Harvey Wiley Corbett were retained as consultants. The team also included Wallace Harrison, who would later become the family's principal architect and adviser to John Rockefeller Jr.'s son Nelson. Hood, Morris, and Corbett were the consultants on "architectural style and grouping", although Morris was in the process of being fired. Todd also hired L. Andrew Reinhard and Henry Hofmeister as rental or tenant architects, to design the floor plans for the complex, and who were known as the most pragmatic of the Associated Architects. Hood, Corbett, Harrison, Reinhard, and Hofmeister were generally considered to be the principal architects. They mostly communicated with Todd, Robertson and Todd, rather than with Rockefeller himself.

Hugh Ferriss and John Wenrich were hired as "architectural renderers", to produce drawings of the proposed buildings based on the Associated Architects' blueprints. Rene Paul Chambellan was commissioned to sculpt the models of the buildings, and he would later also create some of the art for the center.

=== Original plan and failure ===
The Metropolitan Opera was reluctant to commit to the development, and they refused to take up the site's existing leases until they were certain that they had enough money to do so. In January 1929, Cutting unsuccessfully asked Rockefeller for assistance in buying the leases. Since the Met would not have any funds until after they sold their existing building by April, Heydt suggested that the Metropolitan Square Corporation buy the leases instead, in case the Met ultimately did not have money to relocate. The Met felt that the cost of the new opera house would far exceed the potential profits. They wanted to sell their existing facility and move into the proposed new opera house by 1931, which meant that all existing leases would need to be resolved by May 1930. Otherwise, the new opera house could not be mortgaged, and Columbia would regain possession of the land, which would be a disadvantage for both the Met and Rockefeller.

In August 1929, Rockefeller created a holding company to purchase the strip of land on Sixth Avenue that he did not already lease, so he could construct a larger building on the site and maximize his profits. The company was called the Underel Holding Corporation because the land in question was under the Sixth Avenue Elevated.

By October 1929, Todd announced a new proposal that differed greatly from Morris's original plan. Todd suggested that the site's three blocks be further subdivided into eight lots, with an "Opera Plaza" in the middle of the center block. The complex would contain the Metropolitan Opera facility; a retail area with two 25-story buildings; department stores; two apartment buildings; and two hotels, with one rising 37 stories and the other being 35 stories. The Met's opera house would have been on the center block between 49th and 50th Streets east of Sixth Avenue. The retail center would be built around or to the west of the opera building. According to one New York Times account, the shops in the Metropolitan Opera development would be laid out in a way similar to that of the retail center in the English city of Chester.

The main hurdle to the plan was the Met's reluctance to commit to the development by buying leases from existing tenants and handing the leases over to Columbia. Rockefeller stood to lose $100,000 per year (equivalent to $1.4 million in 2024) if he leased the new opera house. Todd had objected that the opera house would be a blight rather than a benefit for the neighborhood, as it would be closed most of the time. After the stock market crash of 1929, these concerns were mooted: the opera could no longer afford to move. The Met instead suggested that Rockefeller finance their relocation by purchasing a half-interest in the old opera house and the land under it, an offer that he refused. On December 6, 1929, the plans for the new opera house were abandoned completely.

== New plans ==
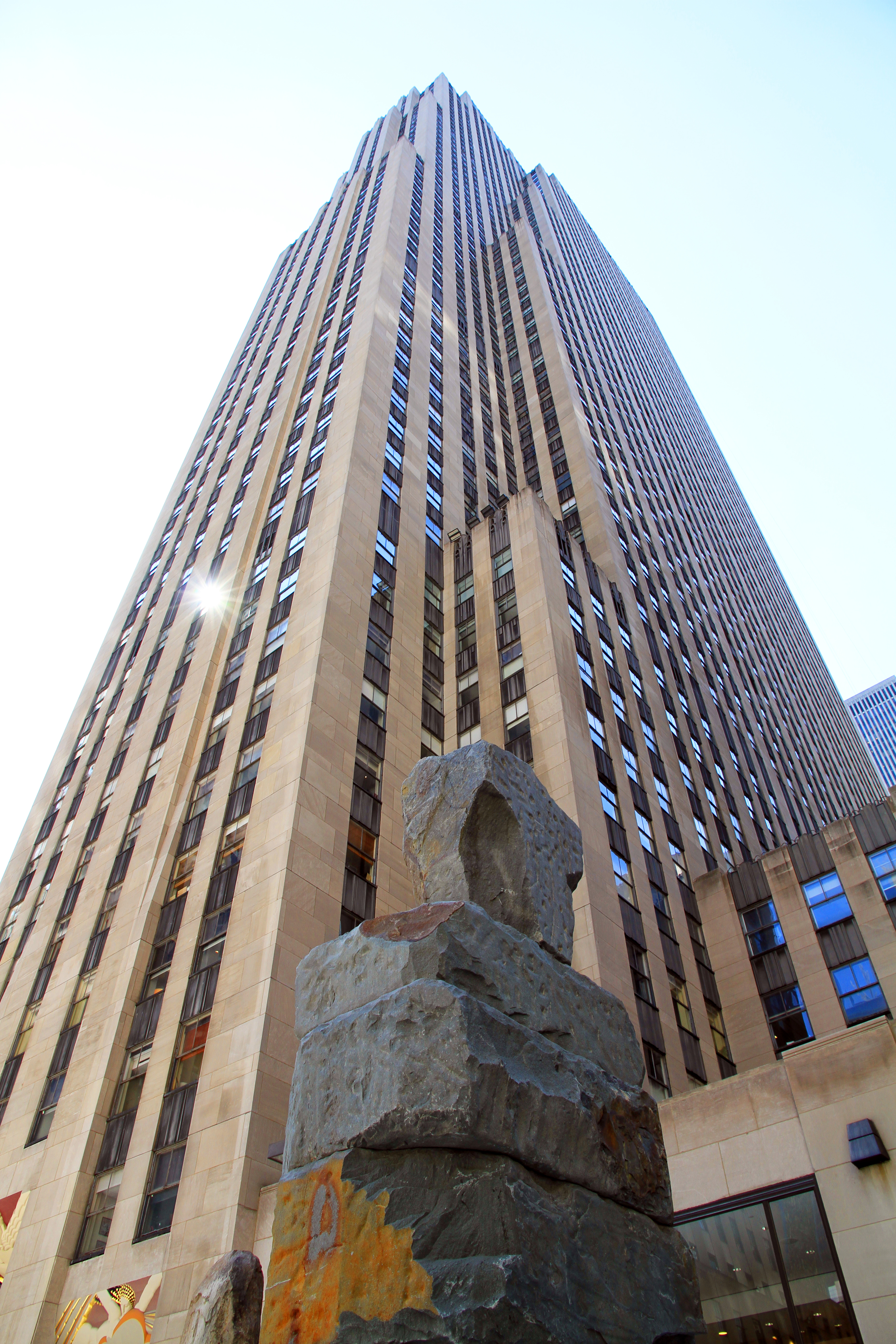
The former RCA Building at 30 Rockefeller Plaza

With the lease still in effect, Rockefeller had to quickly devise new plans so that the three-block Columbia site could become profitable. Hood came up with the idea to negotiate with the Radio Corporation of America (RCA) and its subsidiaries, National Broadcasting Company (NBC) and Radio-Keith-Orpheum (RKO), to build a mass media entertainment complex on the site. This was achievable because Wallace Harrison was good friends with Julian Street, a Chicago Tribune reporter whose wife's great-uncle Edward Harden was part of the RCA board of directors. At Hood's request, Harrison made a lunch date to tell Street about the mass-media complex proposal. Harden, in turn, described the idea to RCA's founder Owen D. Young, who was amenable to the suggestion. It turned out that Young, a longtime friend of Rockefeller's, had been thinking of constructing a "Radio City" for RCA for several years, even as the company was already in the process of developing a new building on Lexington Avenue. Rockefeller later stated, "It was clear that there were only two courses open to me. One was to abandon the entire development. The other to go forward with it in the definite knowledge that I myself would have to build it and finance it alone."

In January 1930, Rockefeller tasked Raymond Fosdick, the Rockefeller Foundation's future head, with scheduling a meeting with Young. The RCA founder was enthusiastic about the project, expressing his vision for a complex that, according to Daniel Okrent, contained "an opera house, a concert hall, a Shakespeare theater—and both broadcast studios and office space for RCA and its affiliated companies". RCA president David Sarnoff would join the negotiations in early 1930. Sarnoff immediately recognized Radio City's potential to affect the fledgling television and radio industries. By May, RCA and its affiliates had made an agreement with Rockefeller Center managers. RCA would lease 1 million square feet (93,000 m^{2}) of studio space; get naming rights to the development's largest tower; and develop four theaters, at a cost of $4.25 million per year (equivalent to $63.3 million in 2024). NBC was assured exclusive broadcasting rights at Rockefeller Center as part of the deal.

=== RCA media complex proposals ===
In January, Todd released a new plan called G-3. Like the previous Metropolitan Opera proposal, this plan subdivided the complex into eight blocks with a plaza in the middle of the center block. It was similar to his October 1929 plan for the Met, with one major change: the opera house was replaced with a 50-story building. The 50-story tower was included because its larger floor area would provide large profits, and its central location was chosen because Todd believed that the center of the complex was too valuable to waste on low-rise buildings. Plans for a new Metropolitan Opera building on the site were still being devised, including one proposal to place an office building over the opera facility. However, this was seen as increasingly unlikely due to the Met's reluctance to move to the complex. A proposal to create roads that crossed the complex diagonally was briefly considered, but it was dropped because it involved decommissioning city streets, which could only be done after lengthy discussions with city officials. Plan G-3 was presented to the Metropolitan Square Corporation's managers in February. At the time, Todd thought that G-3 was the most viable proposal for the complex.

Another plan called H-1 was revealed in March 1930, after the Underel Corporation had acquired the land near Sixth Avenue. The leases for the newly acquired land contained specific stipulations on how it was to be used. Under this new proposal, there would be facilities for "television, music, radio, talking pictures and plays". RCA planned to build theaters on the north and south blocks near Sixth Avenue, with office buildings above the theaters' Sixth Avenue sides. The theater entrances would be built to the west along Sixth Avenue, and the auditoriums would be to the east, since the city's building code prohibited the erection of structures over the auditoriums of theaters. The delivery lane was eliminated in this plan, as it was perceived as unnecessary: the theaters would only see occasional deliveries. The complex would also contain three tall buildings in the center of each block, including a 60-story building in the center block for RCA (the current 30 Rockefeller Plaza). Todd suggested that this large tower be placed on Sixth Avenue because the Sixth Avenue Elevated would reduce the value of any other properties at the west end of the complex. On Fifth Avenue there would be a short oval-shaped retail building, whose top floors would be occupied by Chase National Bank offices. There would be a plaza between the oval building and RCA's building, and a restaurant atop the former. A transcontinental bus terminal would be built underground to entice tenants who might otherwise rent near Penn Station or Grand Central.

Plan H-1 was approved in June 1930. In the middle of the month, The New York Times announced the plans for the "Radio City" project between 48th Street, 51st Street, Fifth Avenue, and Sixth Avenue. Additional details were released: for example, the $200 million cost projection for the three skyscrapers (equivalent to $2.98 billion in 2024). To provide space for the plaza, 49th and 50th streets would be covered over, and there would be parking structures both above- and underground, while the streets surrounding the project would be widened to accommodate the heavy traffic. Four theaters would also be built: two small theaters for television, comedy, and drama; a larger one for movies; and another theater, larger still, for vaudeville. Under the plan, the demolition of the site's existing structures would start later in the year, and the complex would be complete by 1933. This plan had not been disclosed to the general public prior to the announcement, and even John Rockefeller Jr. was surprised by the $350 million cost estimate (equivalent to $5.22 billion in 2024), since a private project of this size was unprecedented.

Since Rockefeller had invested large sums of money in the stock market, his wealth declined sharply as a result of the 1929 stock market crash. In September 1930, Rockefeller and Todd started looking for funding to construct the buildings; and by November they secured a tentative funding agreement with the Metropolitan Life Insurance Company. In March 1931, this agreement was made official, with Metropolitan Life agreeing to lend $65 million (equivalent to $970 million in 2024) to the Rockefeller Center Development Corporation. Metropolitan Life's president Frederick H. Ecker granted the money on two conditions: that no other entity would grant a loan to the complex, and that Rockefeller co-sign the loan so that he would be responsible for paying it off if the development corporation defaulted. Rockefeller covered ongoing expenses through the sale of oil company stock. Other estimates placed Radio City's cost at $120 million (equivalent to $1.79 billion in 2024) based on plan H-16, released in August 1930, or $116.3 million (equivalent to $1.73 billion in 2024) based on plan F-18, released in November 1930.

==== Design influences ====
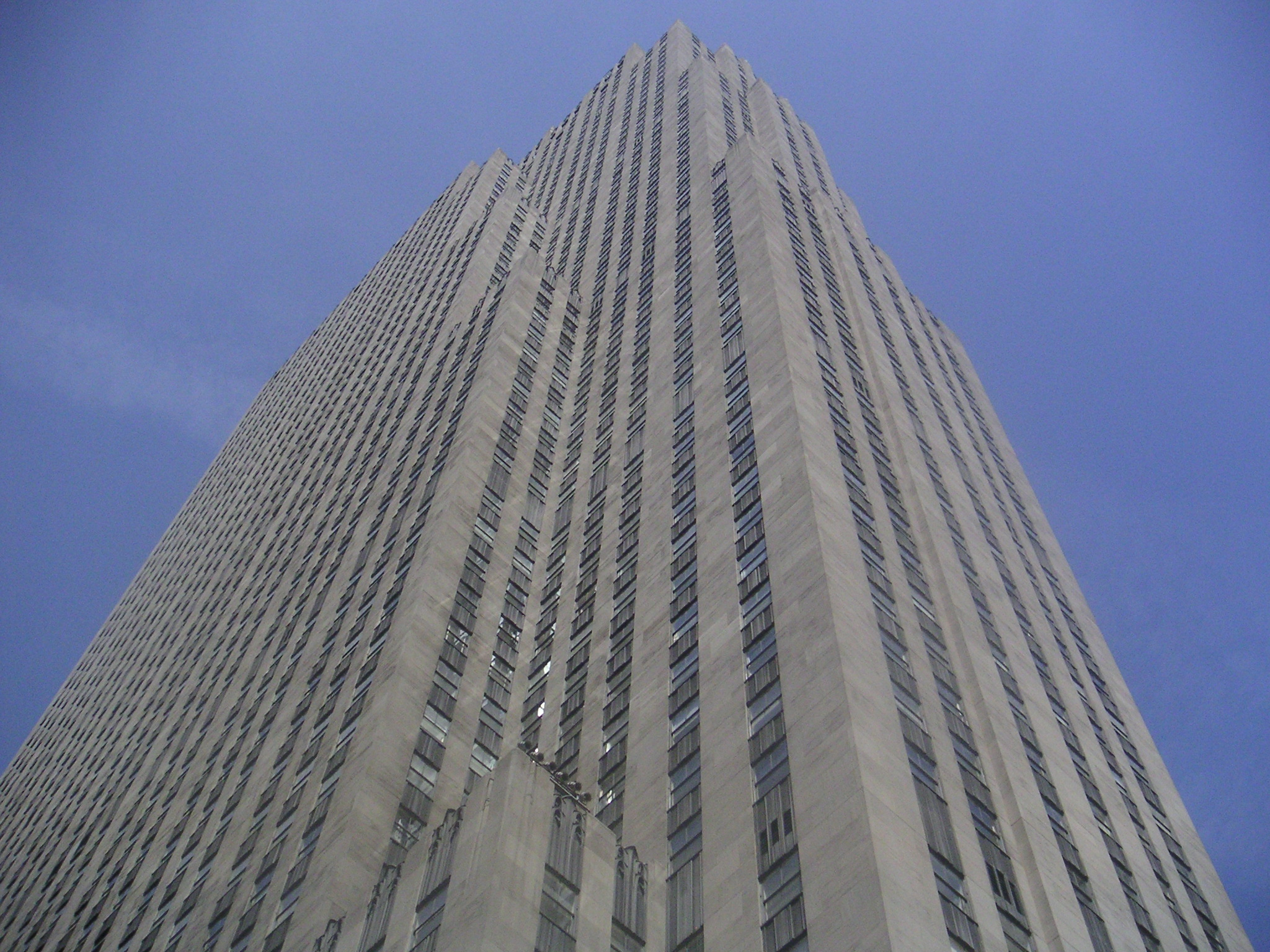
Setbacks on 30 Rockefeller Plaza, as specified by the 1916 Zoning Resolution

The design of the complex was affected greatly by the 1916 Zoning Resolution, which restricted the height that street-side exterior walls of New York City buildings could rise before they needed to incorporate setbacks that recessed the buildings' exterior walls from the streets. (Note: As per the 1916 Zoning Act, the wall of any given tower that faces a street could only rise to a certain height, proportionate to the street's width, at which point the building had to be set back by a given proportion. This system of setbacks would continue until the tower reaches a floor level in which that level's floor area was 25% that of the ground level's area. After that 25% threshold was reached, the building could rise without restriction. This law was superseded by the 1961 Zoning Resolution.) Although the 66-story RCA Building was so far from the street that it could have simply risen as a slab without any setbacks, Hood decided to include setbacks anyway because they represented "a sense of future, a sense of energy, a sense of purpose", according to architecture expert Alan Balfour. A subsequent change to the zoning resolution in 1931, shortly after the Empire State Building opened, increased the maximum speed of New York City buildings' elevators from 700 feet per minute (210 m/min) to 1,200 feet per minute (370 m/min), ostensibly as a result of lobbying from the Rockefeller family. This allowed Rockefeller Center's designers to reduce the number of elevators in the complex's buildings, especially the RCA Building. Originally, the elevators were supposed to be installed by the Otis Elevator Company, but Westinghouse Electric Corporation got the contract after agreeing to move into the RCA Building. This turned out to be a financially sound decision for Rockefeller Center, since Westinghouse's elevators functioned better than Otis's.

Hood and Corbett suggested some plans that were eccentric by the standards of the time. One plan entailed the construction of a massive pyramid spanning all three blocks; this was later downsized to a small retail pyramid, which evolved into the oval retail building. Another plan included a system of vehicular ramps and bridges across the complex. In July 1930, Hood and Corbett briefly discussed the possibility of constructing the entire complex as a superblock with promenades leading from the RCA Building. This suggestion was not considered further because, as with the diagonal-streets plan, it would have involved decommissioning streets. Eventually, all of the plans were streamlined into a more traditional design, with narrow rectangular slabs, set back from the street, on all of the blocks. Hood created a guideline that all of the office space in the complex would be no more than 27 feet (8.2 m) from a window, which was the maximum distance that sunlight could directly penetrate the interior of a building at New York City's latitude. At the time, air-conditioned office buildings were rare, and the sunlit offices provided comfortable accommodations, as opposed to offices in many older buildings, which were dark and cramped.

=== Plan F-18 ===
During late 1930 and early 1931, the plans were revised and streamlined. March 1931 saw the announcement of Plan F-18, which called for an International Music Hall (now Radio City Music Hall) and its 31-story office building annex to occupy the northernmost of the three blocks, between 50th and 51st streets. The 66-story 831-foot (253 m) RCA Building would be on the central block's western half, between 49th and 50th streets, and would house RCA and NBC offices as well as broadcasting studios. The oval-shaped retail complex would occupy the block's eastern half, with a rooftop garden. A RKO-operated sound theater would be in the southernmost block between 48th and 49th streets. In the center of Radio City would be a new three-block-long private street running between Fifth and Sixth avenues, with a concave plaza at the midpoint. The complex would also include space for a future Metropolitan Opera venue on the northernmost block. An underground pedestrian shopping mall, which would be above the underground bus terminal, was also added in this plan. The complex would include 28,000 windows and more than 125,000 short tons (112,000 long tons) of structural steel, according to the builders. It would cost $250 million.

For the first time, a scale rendering of the proposed complex was presented to the public. The rendering was much criticized, with some taking issue with details or general dimensions of the as-yet-unconfirmed proposal, and others lambasting the location of the tall skyscrapers around the plaza. Daniel Okrent writes that "almost everyone" hated the updated plans. The renowned architectural scholar Lewis Mumford went into exile in upstate New York specifically because the "weakly conceived, reckless, romantic chaos" of the plans for Rockefeller Center had violated his sense of style. Mumford's commentary provoked a wave of blunt, negative criticism from private citizens; newspapers, such as the New York Herald Tribune; and architects, including both Frank Lloyd Wright and Ralph Adams Cram, whose styles were diametrically opposed to each other. The New York Times took note of the "universal condemnation" of the proposal, and after the complex's architects changed their plans in response to the criticism, the Times stated, "It is cheering to learn that the architects and builders of Radio City have been stirred by the public criticism of their plans." Despite the controversy over the complex's design, Rockefeller retained the Associated Architects for his project.

==== Updated retail building and garden plans ====
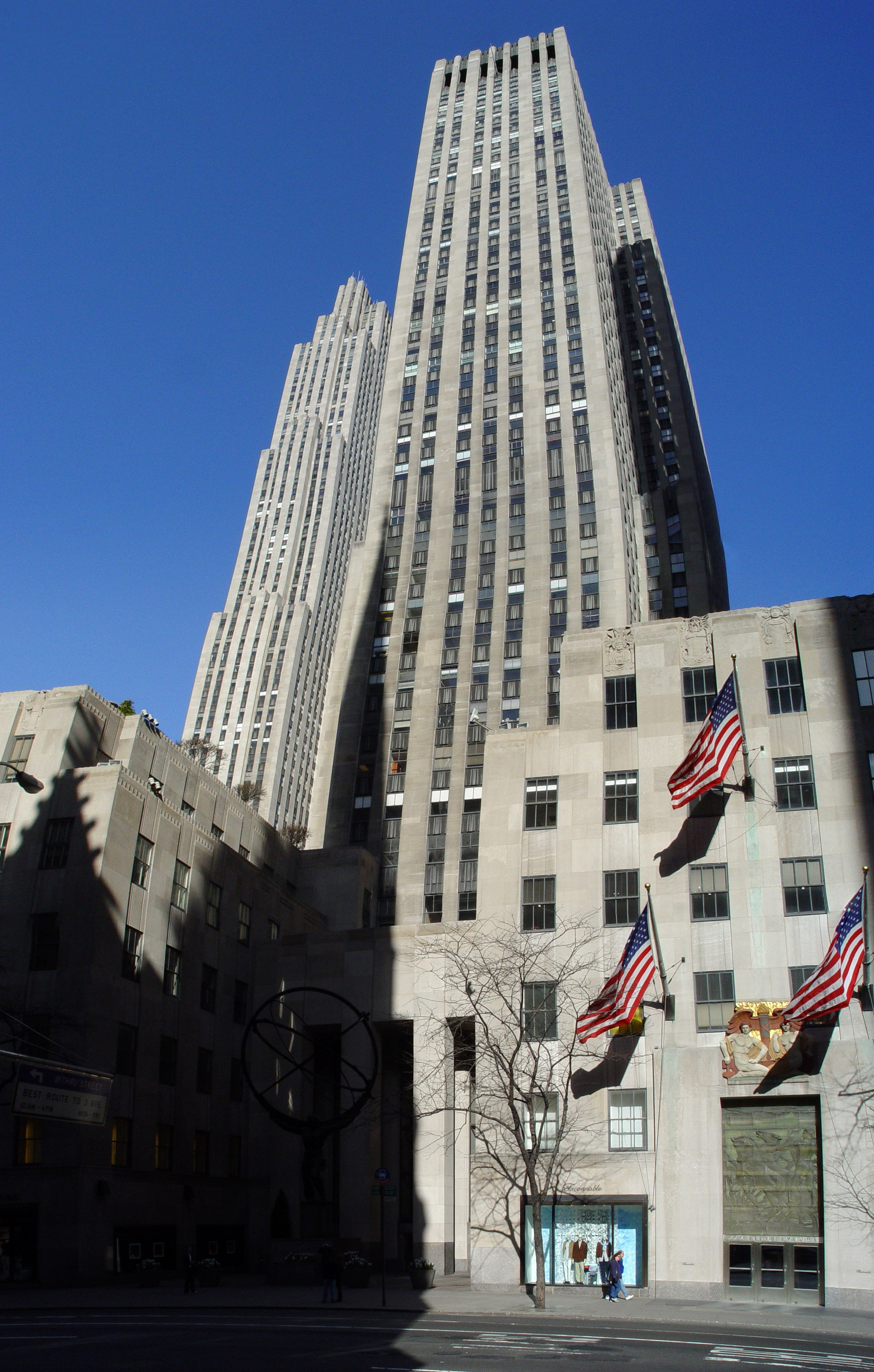
The International Building and two smaller internationally themed buildings replaced an oval-shaped retail building that was originally proposed for the site.

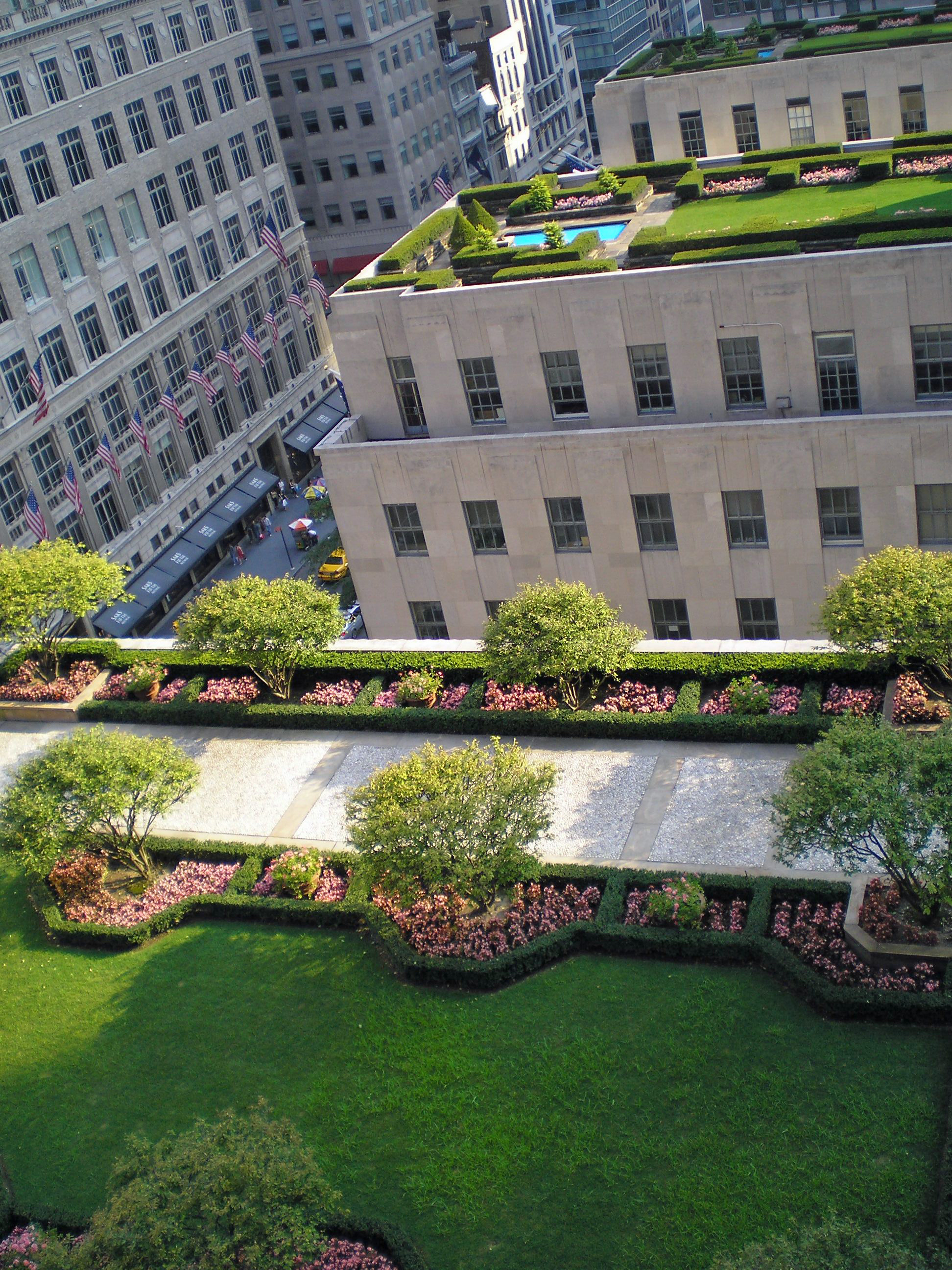
The complex's rooftop gardens

The oval-shaped retail building on Fifth Avenue between 49th and 50th streets was criticized for not fitting in with the rest of Fifth Avenue's architecture, with critics referring to the proposed building as an "oilcan". The original plan had been for two retail buildings, but was changed to one in response to Chase National Bank's request for a single building. However, the oval building was scrapped in early 1931, after Chase could not win exclusive banking rights at the building's location. An updated plan, F-19, restored two smaller 6-story retail buildings to the site of the oval building, and proposed a new 40-story tower for a nearby site. These buildings not only would provide retail space but also would fit in with Fifth Avenue's architecture.

In the new plan, an oval-shaped central plaza would be recessed below ground level, with plantings surrounding a large central fountain. A wide, planted esplanade, between 50th and 51st streets, would lead pedestrians from Fifth Avenue, on the east, to the plaza and to the RCA Building to the west, with steps leading down to the plaza. The western side of the plaza would lead directly to the underground pedestrian mall. A replica of Niagara Falls' Horseshoe Falls would also be built above a 100-by-20-foot (30 by 6 m) reflecting pool, while ivy would be planted on the outside of some of the buildings. In a June 1932 revision to the plan, the proposed plaza's shape was changed to a rectangle, and the fountain was moved to the western side of the plaza. The sculptor Paul Manship was then hired to create a sculpture to place on top of the fountain; his bronze Prometheus statue was installed on the site in 1934.

As a concession for the loss of the rooftop gardens planned for the oval building, Hood suggested that all of the complex's setbacks below the 16th floor be covered with gardens. Hood thought this was the cheapest way to make the buildings look attractive, with a cost estimate of $250,000 to $500,000 (about $3.7 to $7.5 million in 2025) that could pay for itself if the gardens were made into botanical gardens. Hood proposed a three-tiered arrangement, inspired by a similar plan of Le Corbusier. The lowest tier would be at ground level; the middle tier would be atop the retail buildings' low-lying roofs and the skyscrapers' setbacks; and the highest tier would be at the tops of the skyscrapers. A March 1932 update to the rooftop garden proposal also included two ornately decorated bridges that would connect the complex's three blocks, though the bridge plan was later dismissed due to its high cost. Ultimately, only seven disconnected gardens would be built.

Since American tenants were reluctant to rent in the retail buildings, Rockefeller Center's manager Hugh Robertson, formerly of Todd, Robertson and Todd, suggested foreign tenants for the buildings. They held talks with prospective Czech, German, Italian, and Swedish lessees who could potentially occupy the six-story internationally themed buildings on Fifth Avenue, although it was reported that Dutch, Chinese, Japanese, and Russian tenancies were also considered. The first themed building that was agreed on was the British Empire Building, the more southerly of the two buildings, which would host governmental and commercial ventures of the United Kingdom. In February 1932, French tenants agreed to occupy the British Empire Building's twin to the north, La Maison Française. A department store and 30-story building (later changed to 45 stories) were planned for the block to the north of the twin buildings, between 50th and 51st streets, with the department store portion facing Fifth Avenue. A "final" layout change to that block occurred in June, when the department store was replaced by the tower's two retail wings, which would be nearly identical to the twin retail buildings to their south. The two new retail buildings, connected to each other, and to the main tower, with a galleria, were proposed to serve Italian, and possibly also German, interests upon completion.

==== Theaters ====
Out of the four theaters included in plan H-1, of March 1930, the city only approved the construction of two; and thus, only these two theaters were constructed. Samuel "Roxy" Rothafel, a successful theater operator who was renowned for his dominance of the city's theater industry, joined the center's advisory board in 1930. He offered to build two theaters: a large, vaudeville "International Music Hall", on the northernmost block, with more than 6,200 seats; and the smaller, 3,500-seat "RKO Roxy" movie theater on the southernmost block. The idea for these theaters was inspired by Roxy's failed expansion of the 5,920-seat Roxy Theatre on 50th Street, one-and-a-half blocks away. Roxy also envisioned an elevated promenade between the two theaters, but this was never published in any of the official blueprints. Meanwhile, proposals for a Metropolitan Opera House on the site persisted. Official plans for a facility to the east of the RKO Roxy were filed in April 1932; the projected 4,042-seat opera facility would contain features such as a second-floor esplanade extending across 50th Street. However, the Met was unable to fund such a move, so the proposed new opera house was relegated to tentative status.

In September 1931, a group of NBC managers and architects toured Europe to find performers and look at theater designs. However, the group did not find any significant architectural details that they could use in the Radio City theaters. In any case, Roxy's friend Peter B. Clark turned out to have much more innovative designs for the proposed theaters than the Europeans did. The Music Hall was designed by architect Edward Durell Stone and interior designer Donald Deskey in the Art Deco style. Eugene Schoen was selected to design the RKO Roxy.

==== Pedestrian mall ====
In December 1931, the Rockefeller Center Corporation put forth its expanded plans for the underground pedestrian mall. It would now include a series of people mover tunnels, similar to the U.S. Capitol subway, which would link the complex to locations such as Grand Central Terminal and Penn Station. A smaller, scaled-down version of the plan was submitted to the New York City Board of Estimate in October 1933. The plan included two vehicular tunnels to carry 49th and 50th streets underneath the entire complex, as well as a subterranean pedestrian mall connecting the buildings in the complex. Additionally, a 0.75-mile (1.21 km) system of pedestrian passages would be 34 feet (10 m) underground, and a 125-by-96-foot (38 by 29 m) sunken lower plaza would connect to the mall via a wide concourse under the RCA Building. The complex-wide vehicular tunnels were not built; instead, a truck ramp from ground level to the underground delivery rooms was built at 50th Street.

==== Unbuilt Metropolitan Avenue ====
An unfulfilled revision to the plan was submitted in May 1931, when Benjamin Wistar Morris, the architect of the original Opera proposal, proposed enhancing the complex's private passageway into a public "Metropolitan Avenue", which would run from 42nd to 59th streets. The avenue would break up the 920-foot-long (280 m) distance between Fifth and Sixth avenues, which was the longest gap between two numbered avenues in Manhattan. This was not a new proposal, as Mayor William Jay Gaynor had posited a similar avenue from 34th to 59th Streets in 1910, and Wistar himself had proposed the avenue in 1928 or 1929. If built, Metropolitan Avenue would have facilitated traffic through Rockefeller Center, in a manner similar to how Vanderbilt Avenue between Madison and Park Avenues had assisted traffic flow around nearby Grand Central Terminal. Ultimately, only the section between 48th and 51st streets was built; it now comprises Rockefeller Plaza, a pedestrian street.

=== Art program ===
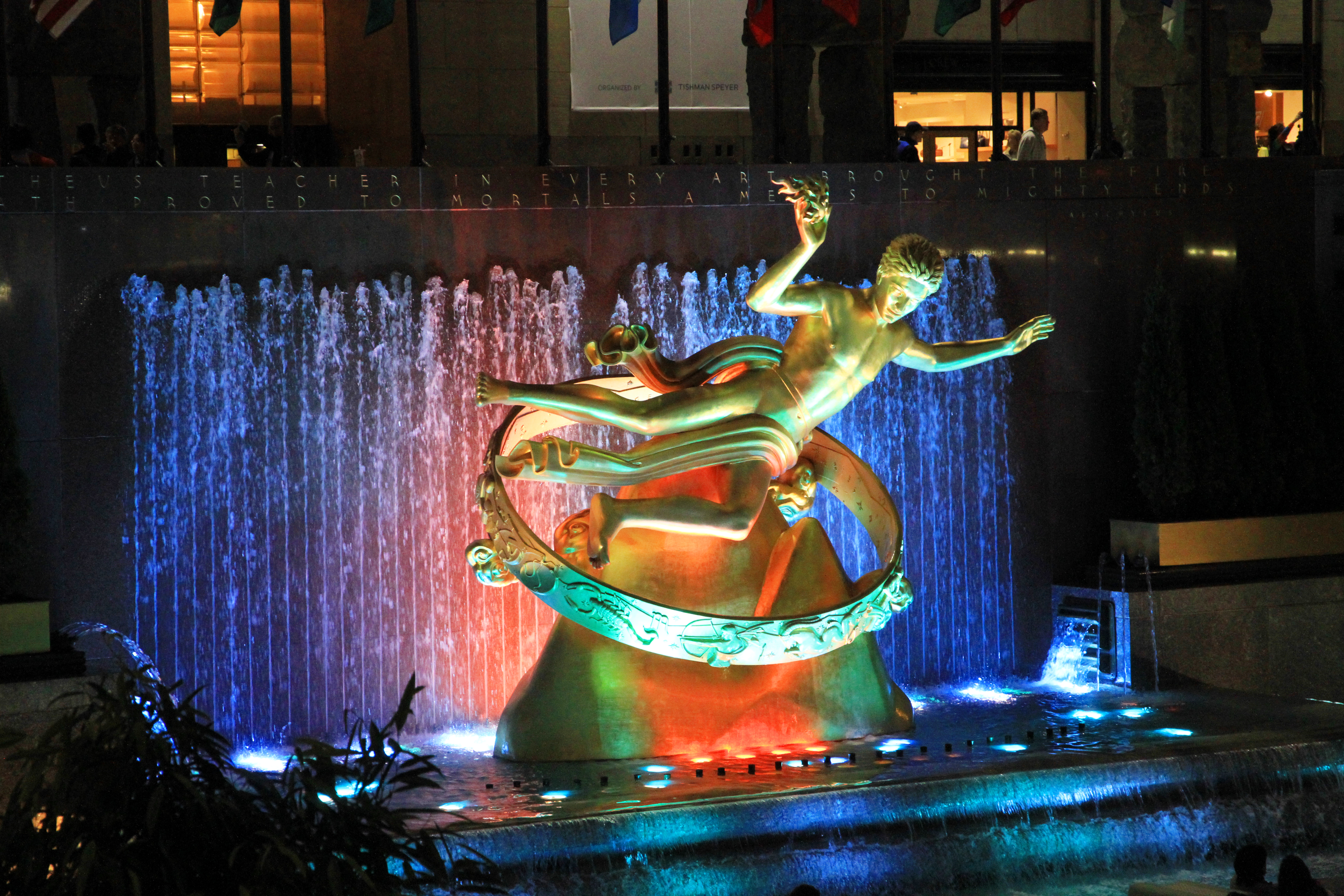
Prometheus, one of the works created as part of Rockefeller Center's art program

Both Raymond Hood and John Todd believed that the center needed visual enhancement besides the rooftop gardens. Initially, Todd had only planned to allocate about $150,000 toward the building's art program, but Rockefeller wanted artworks that had meaningful purposes rather than purely aesthetic ones. In November 1931, Todd suggested the creation of a program for placing distinctive artworks within each of the buildings. Hartley Burr Alexander, a noted mythology and symbology professor, was tasked with planning the complex's arts installations. Alexander submitted his plan for the site's artwork in December 1932. As part of the proposal, the complex would have a variety of sculptures, statues, murals, friezes, decorative fountains, and mosaics. Expanding upon Hood's setback-garden plan, Alexander's proposal also included rooftop gardens atop all the buildings, which would create a "Babylonian garden" when viewed from above.

At first, Alexander suggested "Homo faber, Man the Maker" as the complex's overarching theme, representing satisfaction with one's occupation rather than with the wage. However, that theme was not particularly well received by the architects, so Alexander proposed another theme, the "New Frontiers"; this theme dealt with social and scientific innovations and represented the challenges that humanity faced "after the conquest of the physical world". In theory, this was considered a fitting theme, but Alexander had been so specific about the details of the necessary artworks that it limited the creative license for any artists who would execute such works. Alexander had created a 32-page paper that explained exactly what needed to be done for each artwork, with some of the key themes underlined in all caps, giving the paper "a tone more Martian than human", according to Okrent. In March 1932, Alexander was fired and replaced with a panel of five artists. The panel agreed on the current theme, "The March of Civilization", but by that point some of the art of previous themes had already been commissioned, including the works that Alexander had proposed.

The process of commissioning art for Rockefeller Center was complicated. Each building's architects would suggest some artwork. Todd would eliminate all of the unconventional proposals, and Rockefeller had the final say on many of the works. There were many locations that needed art commissioned, which prevented any specific artistic style from dominating the complex. Specialists from around the world were retained for the art program: for instance, Edward Trumbull coordinated the colors of the works inside the buildings, and Léon-Victor Solon did the same job for the exterior pieces.

Gaston Lachaise, a renowned painter of female nudes, executed the commission for six uncontroversial bas-reliefs for Rockefeller Center, four at the front of 1230 Avenue of the Americas (RCA Building West) and two at the back of the International Building. The Prometheus, Youth, and Maiden sculptures that Paul Manship had created for the complex were prominently situated in the complex's lower plaza. Barry Faulkner had only one commission for the entirety of Rockefeller Center: a mosaic mural above the entrance of 1230 Avenue of the Americas. Alfred Janniot also created a single work for Rockefeller Center, the bronze panel outside La Maison Francaise's entrance. Lee Lawrie was by far the complex's most prolific artist, with 12 works. Most of Lawrie's commissions were limestone screens above the main entrances of buildings, but he had also created two of Rockefeller Center's best-known artworks: the Atlas statue in the International Building's courtyard, and the 37-foot-tall (11 m) Wisdom screen above the RCA Building's main entrance. Ezra Winter, who created the "Quest for the Fountains of Eternal Youth" mural in Radio City Music Hall's lobby, largely adhered to Alexander's original specifications for the mural.

One of the center's more controversial works was created by Diego Rivera, whom Nelson Rockefeller had hired to create a color fresco for the 1,071-square-foot (99 m^{2}) wall in the RCA Building's lobby. His painting, Man at the Crossroads, became controversial, as it contained Moscow May Day scenes and a clear portrait of Lenin, which had not been apparent in initial sketches (see Rockefeller Center § Man at the Crossroads.) Nelson issued a written warning to Rivera to replace the offending figure with an anonymous face, but Rivera refused, so in mid-1933, Rivera was paid for his commission and workers covered the mural with paper. The fresco was demolished completely in February 1934, and it was subsequently replaced by Josep Maria Sert's American Progress mural. As a result of the Man at the Crossroads controversy, Nelson scaled back his involvement with the complex's art, and his father began scrutinizing all of the artworks thereafter commissioned for the center.

One of the sculptor Attilio Piccirilli's works at Rockefeller Center would also be contested, albeit not until after the complex was finished. He had created bas-relief carvings above the entrances of Palazzo d'Italia and the International Building North. Piccirilli's relief on the Palazzo d'Italia was removed in 1941 because the panels were seen as an overt celebration of fascism, but his International Building North panels were allowed to remain.

=== Change in name ===
During early planning, the development was often referred to as "Radio City". Before the announcement that the development would include a mass media complex, there were also other appellations such as "Rockefeller City" and "Metropolitan Square" (after the Metropolitan Square Corporation). Ivy Lee suggested changing the name to "Rockefeller Center". John Rockefeller Jr. initially did not want the Rockefeller family name associated with the commercial project, but was persuaded on the grounds that the name would attract far more tenants. The name was formally changed in December 1931. Rockefeller Jr. and The New York Times originally spelled the complex as "Rockefeller Centre", which was the British way of spelling "Center". After consultation with the famed lexicographer Frank H. Vizetelly, "Centre" was changed to "Center". Over time, the appellation of "Radio City" devolved from describing the entire complex to just the complex's western section; and by 1937, only the Radio City Music Hall contained the "Radio City" name.

== Construction progress ==
According to Daniel Okrent, most sources estimated that between 40,000 and 60,000 people were hired during construction. One estimate by Raymond Fosdick, the Rockefeller Foundation head, placed the figure at 225,000 people, including workers who created materials for the complex elsewhere. When construction started, the city was feeling the full effects of the Depression, with over 750,000 people unemployed and 64% of all construction workers without a job. At the Depression's peak in the mid-1930s, John Rockefeller Jr. was praised as a job creator and a "patriot" for jump-starting the city's economy with the construction project. Rockefeller made an effort to form amicable relationships with Rockefeller Center's workers. Even when Rockefeller had to reduce wages for his union workers, he was praised for not reducing wages as severely as did other construction firms, many of which were either struggling or going bankrupt. At the time, the complex was the largest private building project ever undertaken. Carol Herselle Krinsky, in her 1978 book, describes the center as "the only large private permanent construction project planned and executed between the start of the Depression and the end of the Second World War".

=== Land acquisition and clearing ===
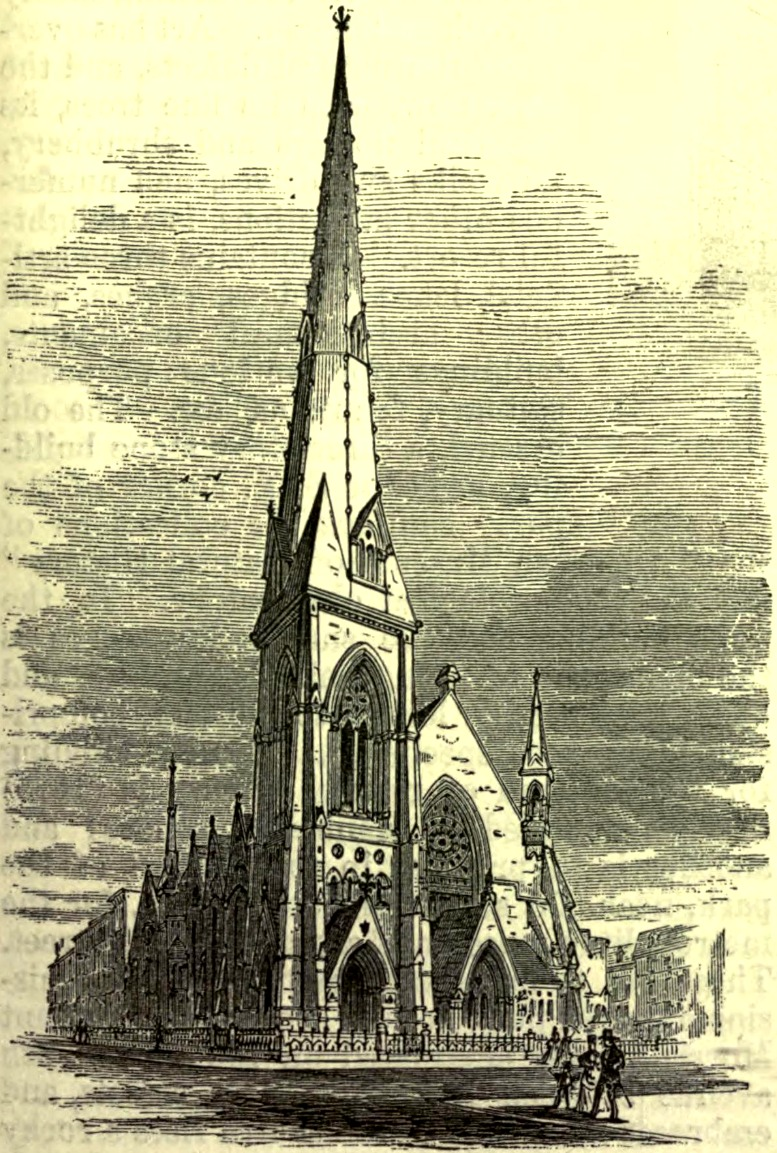
The St. Nicholas Collegiate Reformed Protestant Dutch Church, one of two entities who refused to sell property to Rockefeller Center under any circumstances

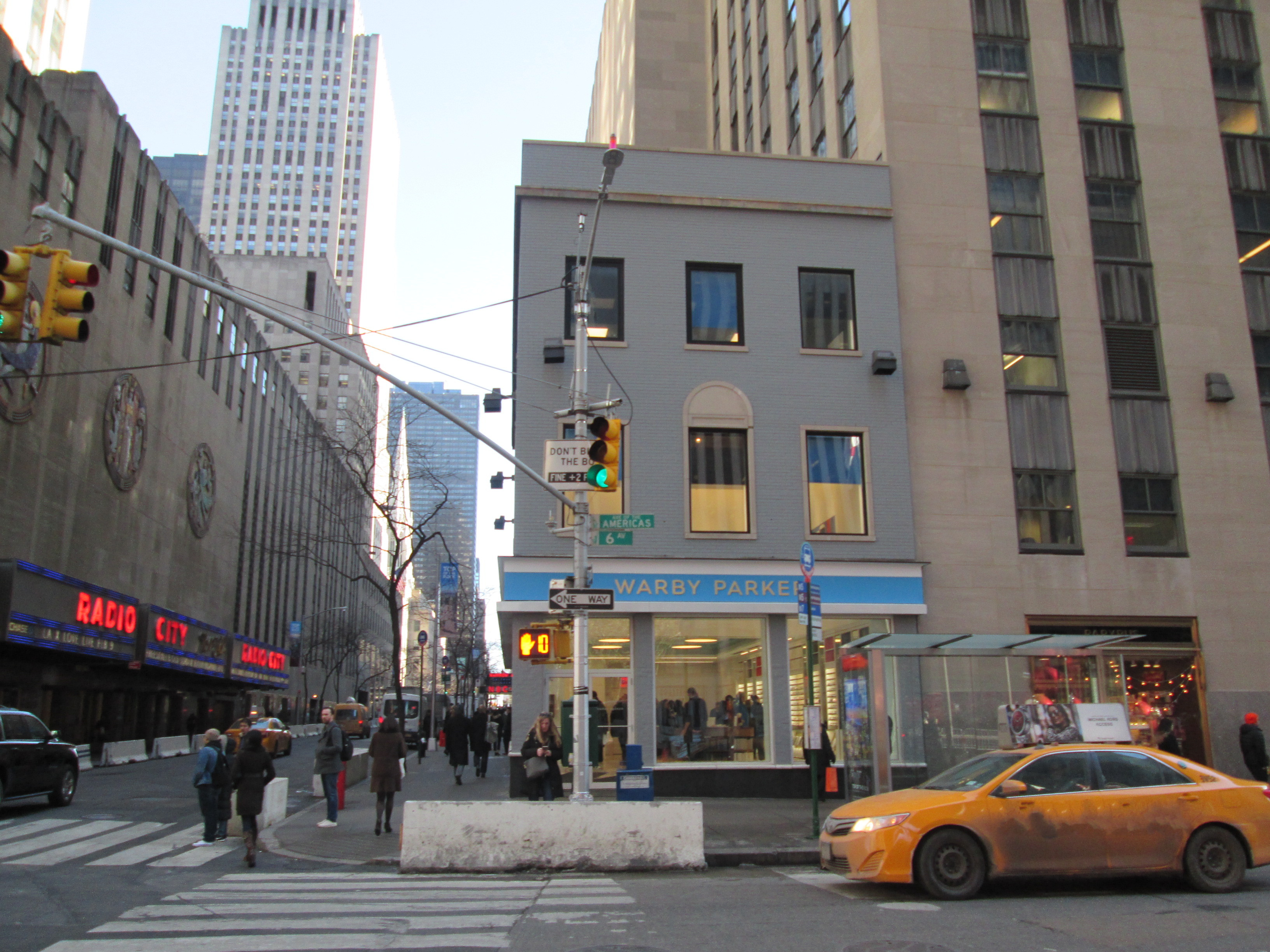
30 Rockefeller Plaza (at right) was built around private property at its northwestern and southwestern corners. The Warby Parker store in the center of this image now occupies the site of the parcel at the northwestern corner of 30 Rockefeller Plaza.

For the project, 228 buildings on the site were razed and some 4,000 tenants relocated, with the estimated aggregate worth of the property exceeding $7 billion (equivalent to $104 billion in 2024). Rockefeller achieved this by buying existing leases from the tenants. In January 1929, William A. White & Sons was hired to conduct the eviction proceedings. They worked with the law firm of Murray, Aldrich & Webb to give checks to tenants in exchange for property, sometimes for over $1 million. The area was mostly occupied by illegal speakeasy bars, as the Prohibition Era had banned all sales of alcoholic beverages. Although the more tenuous of these speakeasies quickly moved elsewhere at the mere mention of formal eviction proceedings, other tenants, including some of the brothels, were harder to evict. Many tenants only moved on certain conditions; and in one case, the firms acquired a lease from the estate of the late gambler Arnold Rothstein, who was murdered two months before he was set to be forcefully evicted from his Upper Estate building in January 1929. Demolition of the structures started in early 1930, and all of the buildings' leases had been bought by August 1931.

The center's managers then set to acquire the remaining lots along Sixth Avenue, and at the southeast corner of the site, so that they could create a larger complex, which led to the formation of the Underel Corporation. The negotiations for the Sixth Avenue properties were conducted by different brokers and law firms so as to conceal the Rockefeller family's involvement in the Underel Corporation's acquisitions. Even so, there were several tenants along Sixth Avenue who initially refused to give up their buildings. (Note: Ella Wendel, the only survivor of a prominent real-estate family, did not give up her row house at 51st Street until her death in 1935. Additionally, 20th Century Fox founder and movie producer William Fox refused to sell his six row houses on 48th Street until late 1931, when the Center Theatre surrounding his property was almost complete. Fox's buildings would remain until the late 1930s, after much of the complex had been constructed.) In total, Charles Heydt spent $10 million (equivalent to $150 million in 2024) on acquiring the Sixth Avenue parcels, as compared to the $6 million (equivalent to $89 million in 2024 dollars) budgeted for the task.

The tenants of two Sixth Avenue properties were ultimately allowed to stay. One lessee, who occupied a plot on the southeast corner of Sixth Avenue and 50th Street, never received a sale offer due to a misunderstanding. The owners of the other parcel, on the northeast corner of Sixth Avenue and 49th Street, demanded an exorbitant price for their property. (Note: The grocer John F. Maxwell would only sell his property at 50th Street if he received $1 million in return. Owing to miscommunication, Heydt told Rockefeller that Maxwell would never sell, and Maxwell himself said that he had never been approached by the Rockefellers; consequently, Maxwell kept his property and Rockefeller Center did not purchase Maxwell's lease until 1970. Maxwell's demand paled in comparison to that of Daniel Hurley and Patrick Daly, owners of a speakeasy on 49th Street, who would sell for $250 million. Rockefeller refused to pay, since it was nearly the cost of the entire tract. They ended up leasing their property until 1975.) 30 Rockefeller Plaza was ultimately built around both parcels.

On the southeast corner of the site, several property owners also refused to sell. Columbia University was willing to give Rockefeller Center Inc. control of all leases in the former Upper Estate that were no longer held by a third party. However, William Nelson Cromwell, a prominent lawyer and Columbia alumnus, who owned three adjacent row houses at 10–14 West 49th Street, would not move out of his house when his lease expired in 1927. The disagreement continued until 1936, during which time Cromwell refused to pay rent on 14 West 49th Street, while Rockefeller Center Inc. withheld $400,000 of Cromwell's rent payments to Columbia. (Note: In 1936, Cromwell prepaid ten years' worth of rent on 12 West 49th, counterbalancing the unpaid rent for the neighboring row house, and agreed to forfeit 14 West 19th.) Rockefeller Center Inc. would later buy 8 West 49th, thus boxing Cromwell's land in between the two Rockefeller Center parcels. The company allowed Robert Walton Goelet to keep the neighboring lot at 2–6 West 49th Street because the company considered his "interest and concern" to be a "large concern". However, he could not develop the land because Cromwell controlled an easement over part of Goelet's land, and the lots at 2–6 West 49th Street would be developed in 1932 as a commercial building called 608 Fifth Avenue. The St. Nicholas Church, on 48th Street behind Goelet's lot, also refused to sell its property despite an offer of up to $7 million for the parcel.

=== Late 1931: start of construction ===
Excavation of the Sixth Avenue side of the plot began in late July 1931, commencing a seven-year period of excavation during which 556,000 cubic yards (425,000 m^{3}) of the underlying Manhattan schist would be removed from the site. By late 1931, the empty blocks were pits up to 80-foot-deep (24 m), with a few buildings still standing at the edges of each block. 49th and 50th streets resembled "causeways skimming the surface of a lake". A field office for the project was erected on Fifth Avenue. It served as the headquarters for the main construction contractors Todd & Brown, which was composed of John Todd's son Webster as well as Joseph O. Brown. Brown was especially involved in eliminating unnecessary costs and selecting firms for supplies.

Designs for the RCA Building and International Music Hall, to the north, were submitted to the New York City Department of Buildings in August 1931, with both buildings scheduled to open in 1932. The contracts for the music hall and 66-story skyscraper were awarded two months later. Ultimately, the project's managers would submit 1,860 contracts to the Department of Buildings. Rockefeller Center's construction progressed quickly; by October 1931, sixty percent of the digging was complete and the first contracts for the buildings had been let. The foundations had been dug up to 50 feet (15 m) below ground, and the first of the RCA Building's 86 piers, descending a maximum of 86 feet (26 m), had been set. Of the brownstones on site, 177 had been demolished by that October, with the majority of the remaining buildings near the avenues. Work on the new Roxy Theatre, to the south of the RCA Building, started that November.

The architects wanted a uniform color for the facades of all 14 of the new buildings. To that end, Raymond Hood, in December 1931, awarded a contract for Indiana Limestone that would make up the facades. At the time, it was the largest order of stone in history, with about 14 million cubic feet (0.40×10^{6} m^{3}) of limestone being shipped. Rockefeller Center's managers also ordered 154,000 short tons (138,000 long tons) of structural steel, the largest such order in history, which cost one-eighth of the projected $250 million total construction cost. The steel order involved a bidding war between Bethlehem Steel and U.S. Steel. The order ultimately went to U.S. Steel, providing 8,000 jobs for its workers, but resulting in a financial loss, as the bidding war resulted in a price that was too low to cover the cost of making the steel. Rockefeller Center also required nearly 23 acres (1 million square feet, 0.093×10^{6} m^{2}) of glass for its windows, 25,000 doors, and 50 thousand cubic feet (1.4×10^{3} m^{3}) of granite.

As a result of the Depression, building costs were cheaper than projected. Although Metropolitan Life's loan of $126 million remained the same, the final cost of the first ten buildings came to $102 million (equivalent to $1.8 billion in 2024 dollars) by the time these structures were completed in 1935. John Todd used the surplus to install extra features in the buildings, such as wider-than-normal utility pipes, a subterranean boiler for the complex in case the steam system malfunctioned, and the complex's limestone facades. Todd even installed sprinklers on the exteriors of the Fifth Avenue retail buildings in case they needed to be converted into factories, since sprinklers were required on industrial buildings at the time. However, not all of the effects were positive: the construction boom of the late 1920s and early 1930s had almost doubled the total amount of real estate in Manhattan, and the construction of Rockefeller Center and the Empire State Building would increase the amount of space by another 56%. As a result, there was a lot of undervalued, vacant space. After RKO's bankruptcy in 1931, Sarnoff convinced John Rockefeller Jr. to buy RKO common stock and RCA preferred stock worth a total of $4 million (equivalent to $58 million in 2024), in return for RCA downsizing its lease by 500 thousand square feet (46×10^{3} m^{2}).

=== 1932–1933 ===
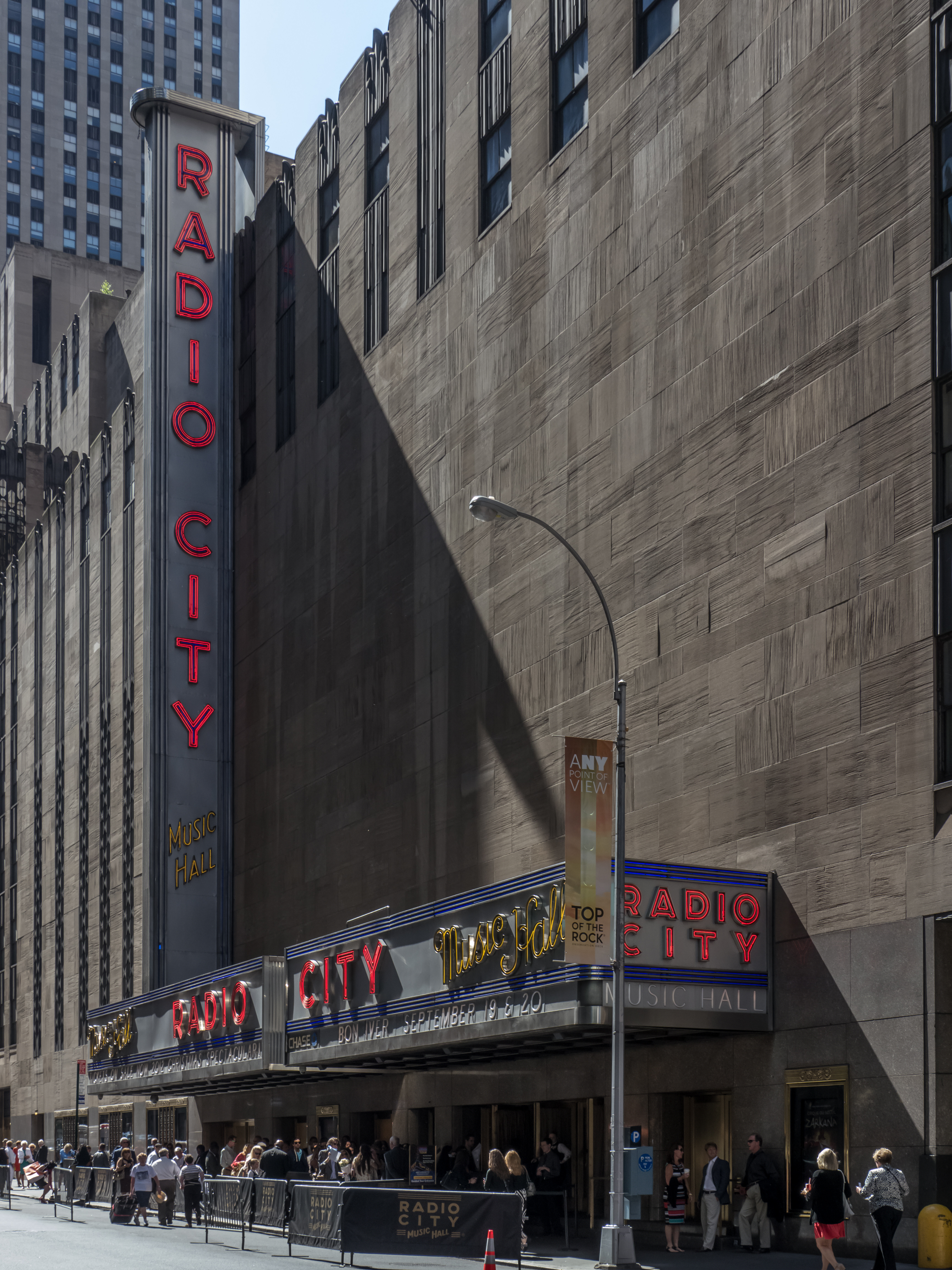
The Radio City Music Hall, the second building in the complex to open

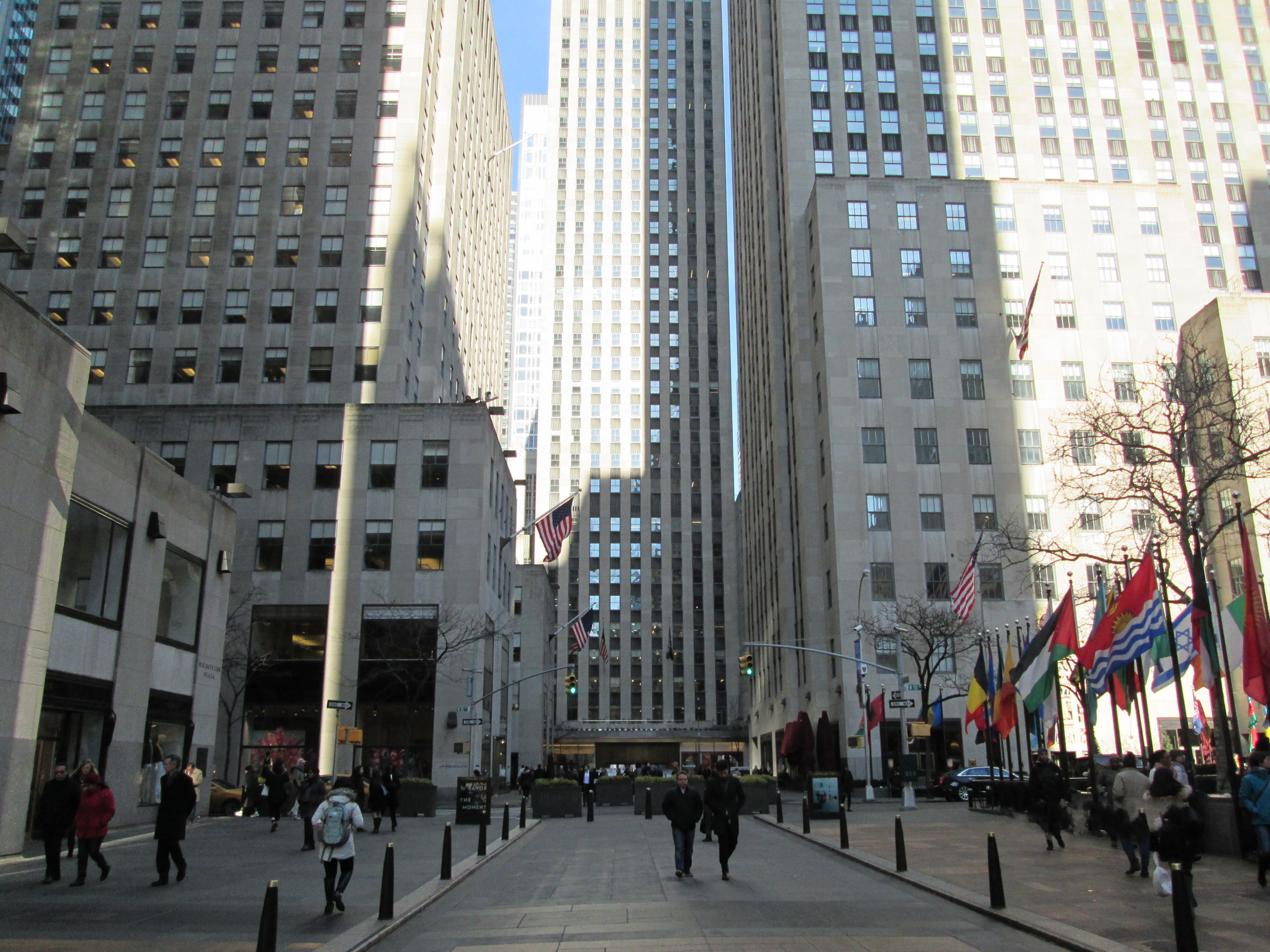
View down Rockefeller Plaza open

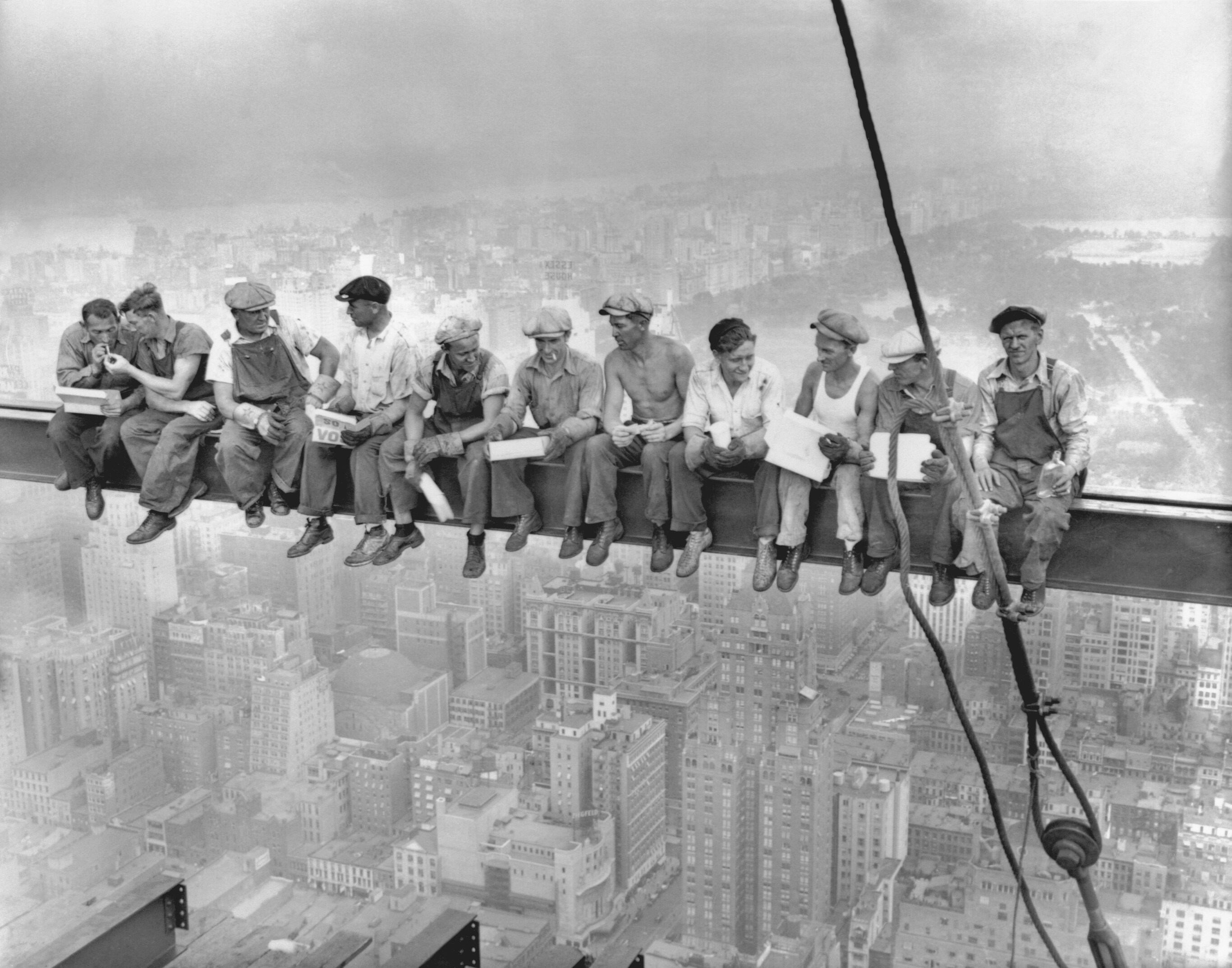
Lunch atop a Skyscraper was taken during the construction, on September 20, 1932

Work on the steel structure of the RCA Building started in March 1932. Meanwhile, the British and French governments had already agreed to occupy the first two internationally themed buildings, and John Rockefeller Jr. started signing tenants from the respective countries. The cornerstone of the British Empire Building was laid in June, when Francis Hopwood, 1st Baron Southborough, placed the symbolic first stone in a ceremony. Significant progress on the theaters had been made by then: RKO Roxy's brickwork had been completed and the limestone-and-granite facade was almost ready to be installed, while the Music Hall's steelwork was complete. By September, both theaters were almost finished, as was the RCA Building, whose structural steel was up to the 64th floor. That month also saw the opening of the RKO Building, the first structure in the complex to be opened. The British Empire Building's structural steel started construction in October.

The Music Hall was the second site to open, on December 27, 1932, although it had topped out in August. This was followed by the RKO Roxy's opening two days later. Roxy originally intended to use the Music Hall as a vaudeville theater, but the opening of the Music Hall was widely regarded as a flop, and both theaters ended up being used for films and performing arts. Radio City's Roxy Theatre had to be renamed the Center Theatre in May 1933 after a lawsuit by William Fox, who owned the original Roxy Theatre on 50th Street. The failure of the vaudeville theater ended up ruining Roxy's enterprise, and he was forced to resign from the center's management in January 1934.

The cornerstone of La Maison Francaise was laid on April 29, 1933, by former French prime minister Édouard Herriot. The British Empire Building was open less than a week later. The RCA Building was slated to be open by May 1, but was delayed because of controversy over the Man at the Crossroads mural in the lobby. In July 1933, the managers opened a 70th-story observation deck atop the RCA Building, It was a great success: the 40-cents-per-head observation deck saw 1,300 daily visitors by late 1935.

Work on the rooftop gardens started in October 1933, and La Maison Francaise opened the same month. In December 1933, workers erected the complex's famed Christmas tree in the center of the plaza for the first time. Since then, it has been a yearly tradition to display a large Christmas tree at the plaza between November and January.

Simultaneously, the city built the part of the canceled "Metropolitan Avenue" that ran through Rockefeller Center. The new street, called "Rockefeller Plaza", was projected to carry an estimated 7,000 vehicles per day upon opening. The first segment, between 49th and 50th streets, opened in 1933, and a northern extension opened in 1934. The new street measured over 60 feet (18 m) wide and ran 722 feet (220 m) through the complex, with four vehicular levels.

=== Advertising and leasing efforts ===
From 1931 until 1944, Rockefeller Center Inc. employed Merle Crowell, the former editor of American Magazine, as the complex's publicist. His first press release, published on July 25, 1931, extolled Rockefeller Center as "the largest building project ever undertaken by private capital". Thereafter, Crowell supplanted Ivy Lee as the complex's official publicity manager, and his subsequent releases employed a variety of superlatives, massive amounts of statistics and calculations, and the occasional bit of hyperbole. Crowell published many new press releases every day, and by the midpoint of the complex's construction in 1935, he also started staging celebrity appearances, news stories, and exhibitions at Rockefeller Center. The goal was for Rockefeller Center to accommodate 34,500 workers and 180,700 daily visitors once it was completed.

Rockefeller hired Hugh Sterling Robertson to solicit tenants and secure lease agreements. It was hard to lease the complex in the wake of the Great Depression, but Robertson managed to identify 1,700 potential tenants, and had held meetings with 1,200 of them by the end of 1933. Rockefeller and his partners were also able to entice some prominent tenants to the center. The Rockefeller family's Standard Oil Company moved into the RCA Building in 1934. Over the next two years, several other major oil companies followed suit and took up leases in Midtown buildings, including Sinclair Oil and Royal Dutch Shell, which moved into Rockefeller Center. The United States Post Office Department opened a facility in the complex in early 1934, and would later rent space in the as-yet-incomplete International Building. The New York Museum of Science and Industry leased some of the less-sought-after space on the RCA Building's lower floors after Nelson Rockefeller became a trustee of the museum in late 1935. Westinghouse moved into the 14th through 17th floors of the RCA Building.

However, Rockefeller Center's managers had a hard time leasing the buildings past 60% occupancy during the earliest years of its existence, which coincided with the middle of the Depression. The Rockefeller family moved into various floors and suites throughout the same building in order to give potential tenants the impression of occupancy. In particular, the family's office took up the entire 56th floor, while the family's Rockefeller Foundation took up the entire floor below, and two other organizations supported by the Rockefellers also moved into the building. Because the sunken central plaza was mostly leased by luxury stores, the complex's managers opened an outdoor restaurant in the plaza in early 1934 to attract other customers. The complex's willingness to gain leases at almost any cost had repercussions of its own. In January 1934, August Heckscher filed a $10,000,000 lawsuit against Rockefeller Center Inc. for convincing tenants to abandon their ongoing leases within his properties in order to take up cheaper leases at Rockefeller Center. The lawsuit stalled in courts until Heckscher's death in 1941, when it was dismissed.

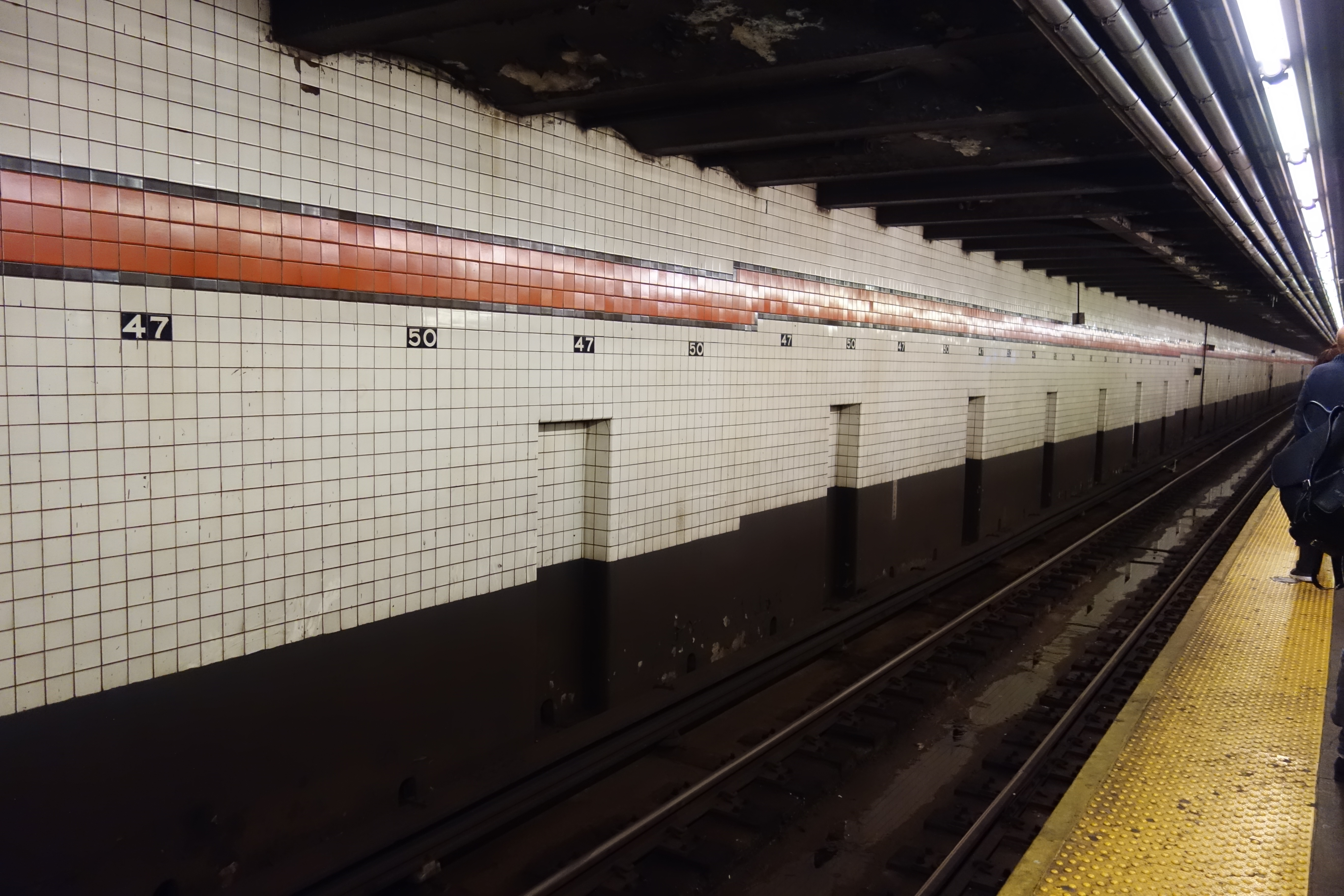
The 47th–50th Streets–Rockefeller Center station, built by the Independent Subway System (IND) at Sixth Avenue

The managers of Rockefeller Center Inc. also wanted the complex to have convenient, nearby mass transit to attract potential lessees. The city-operated Independent Subway System (IND) had opened a subway station at Fifth Avenue and 53rd Street in 1933, drawing workers from Queens. The managers, seeing the success of the business districts around Penn Station and Grand Central, proposed a large rail terminal for trains from Bergen County, New Jersey, so workers from northern New Jersey would be drawn to the complex. Although the managers did decide on a possible location for the terminal on 50th Street, this plan did not work because the IND subway still did not have any stops at the complex itself. The consultants then offered a subway shuttle under 50th Street that would connect to the IND subway station at Eighth Avenue, or a rail line connecting to Penn Station and Grand Central. This plan did not work because the city was uninterested in building the new rail line. The plan was formally dropped in 1934, but proposals for similar ideas persisted until 1939. The city also had plans to construct a line under Sixth Avenue to supplant the elevated railway there, but did not start construction on the Sixth Avenue subway until 1936. Since the IND would be constructing a station at 47th–50th Streets, near the complex, Rockefeller Center's managers also wished to build their own connections to Penn Station and Grand Central using the subway tunnels that were being constructed. However, this proposal was declined because it would require extensive rezoning of the surrounding residential area.

An extension of Rockefeller Plaza northward to the Rockefeller Apartments at 54th Street was also envisioned in early 1934, with Rockefeller Center's managers, between October 1934 and late 1937, acquiring land for the proposed street. Rockefeller legally condemned some of the buildings he acquired for the planned street expansion. The street was never extended for various reasons. (Note: Carol Herselle Krinsky writes that it would have been difficult to use public eminent domain processes for a private street. Additionally, the 21 Club refused to move from their property, which was on 52nd Street along the proposed extension's path. Finally, the extension would have required the rezoning of the area from residential to commercial use, which would have been an arduous process.)

=== 1934–1936 ===
By July 1934, the complex had leased 80% of the available space in the six buildings that were already opened. The lower plaza's large Prometheus statue had been installed in January that year. The complex's underground delivery ramps, on 50th Street under the present-day Associated Press Building, were completed in May. The ramps, a vestige of the tunnels originally planned for 49th and 50th streets, traveled 34 feet (10 m) underground and stretched for 450 feet (140 m). By the end of the year, Wallace Harrison was the lead architect; Andrew Reinhard was in charge of floor plans for tenants; and Henry Hofmeister was tasked with planning the locations of the remaining unbuilt buildings' utilities and structural framework. Raymond Hood had died, while Harvey Corbett had moved on to other projects. Frederick A. Godley and J. André Fouilhoux of Hood, Godley & Fouilhoux, as well as William H. MacMurray of Corbett, Harrison & MacMurray, never had much to do with Rockefeller Center's development.

In May 1934, plans were officially filed for the remaining two International-themed buildings, as well as the larger 38-story, 512-foot (156 m) International Building at 45 Rockefeller Center. Work on the buildings started in September 1934. The more southerly of the retail buildings was dubbed "Palazzo d'Italia" and was to serve Italian interests. The Italian government later reneged on its sponsorship of the building, and the task of finding tenants went to Italian-American businesses. The more northerly small building was originally proposed for German occupation under the name "Deutsches Haus" before Adolf Hitler's rise to power in 1932. Rockefeller ruled this out in September 1933, after being advised of Hitler's Nazi march toward totalitarianism. Russia had also entered into negotiations to lease the final building in 1934; but by 1935, the Russians were no longer actively seeking a lease. With no definite tenant for the other building, the Rockefeller Center's managers reduced the proposed nine-story buildings to six stories, enlarged and realigned the main building from a north–south to a west–east axis, and replaced the proposed galleria between the two retail buildings with an expansion of the International Building's lobby. The empty office site thus became "International Building North", rented by various international tenants. In April 1935, developers opened the International Building and its two wings, which had been built in a record 136 days, from groundbreaking to completion. Aside from the averted controversy with the potential German tenants, the internationally themed complex was seen as a symbol of solidarity during the interwar period, when the United States' entry in the League of Nations was obstructed by American isolationists.

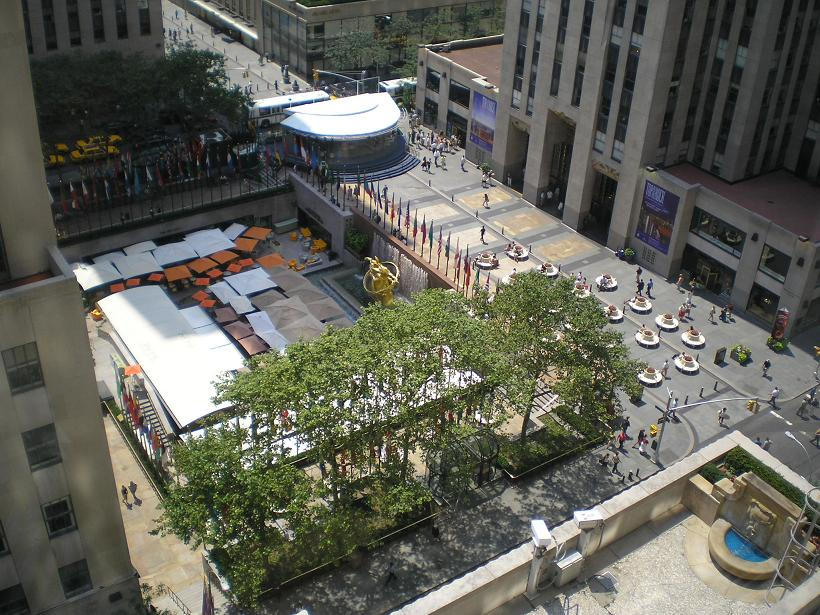
Aerial view of lower plaza

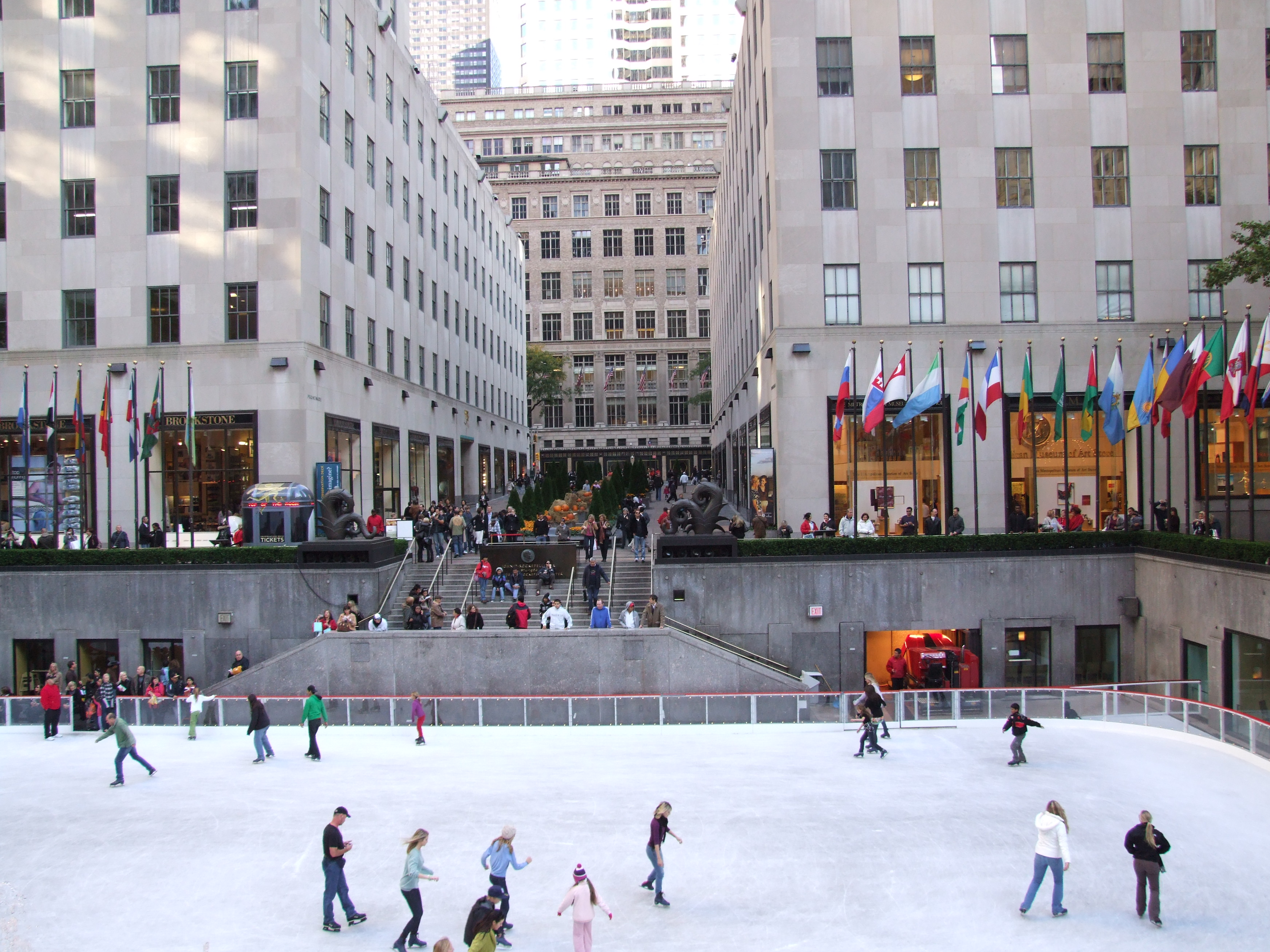
Ice rink in lower plaza

By late April 1935, the "Gardens of the Nations" on the RCA Building's 11th-story roof was complete. Upon opening, its collection of exotic flora attracted many visitors, and it became the most popular garden in Rockefeller Center. However, this novelty soon faded, and the gardens started running a $45,000-per-year deficit by 1937 ($808,000 in 2025 dollars) due to the massive expense involved in hoisting plants, trees, and water to the roofs, as well as a lack of interest among tourists. Gardens on the roofs of the two theaters would also be installed in 1937, but they were not open to the public.

The underground pedestrian mall and ramp system, connecting the three blocks between 48th and 51st streets, was finished in early May. At the time of the mall's opening, 22 of the 25 retail spaces had been leased, and three more buildings were ready for occupancy that month. The underground concourse contained a post office, payphones, and several public restrooms. The complex was starting to attract large crowds of visitors, especially to Radio City Music Hall or one of the other exhibition and performance spaces. Despite this seeming success in the face of the Depression, construction was considered to be behind schedule: all the buildings had originally been set for completion by mid-1935, yet the central parts of the northern and southern blocks were still undeveloped.

Around this time, Rockefeller Center's managers were selling the lots for their failed Rockefeller Plaza extension. In January 1935, newly elected mayor Fiorello H. La Guardia proposed that a Municipal Art Center be built in or near the Rockefeller complex. It would have contained the Museum of Modern Art; the Guggenheim Collection; a costume museum; or broadcasting facilities for the Columbia Broadcasting System (CBS). Initially, the project was supposed to be in Central Park. However, due to legal challenges, the site for the planned art center was moved several blocks south to a site between 51st and 53rd streets between Fifth and Sixth avenues, immediately north of Rockefeller Center. In October 1936, the Museum of Modern Art acquired a site on 53rd Street, across the street from the Municipal Art Center site. Several plans for an art center were discussed, but none were executed because of the same complications that befell the aborted Rockefeller Plaza extension.

Also in 1935, plans were filed for a 16-story western extension of the RCA Building, made of the same material but with extensive links to the pedestrian tunnel system and an elaborate entrance from the under-construction IND station at 47th–50th streets. The subway connection started construction in 1936 but would not open until 1940. Until the subway connection opened, the underground shopping mall was an elaborate catacomb that dead-ended on all sides. The retail space on the lower plaza was not profitable because the stores in the plaza were hidden underneath the rest of the buildings and behind the Prometheus statue, which made the shops hard for tourists to find. By 1935, there were ten times as many workers entering the RCA Building every day as there were visitors to the lower plaza. After several rejected suggestions to beautify the plaza, the managers finally decided on building the Rink at Rockefeller Center for $2,000 after Nelson Rockefeller found that a new system had been invented that allowed artificial outdoor ice skating, enabling him to bring the pastime to Midtown Manhattan. The new rink was open by Christmas 1936. The rink was originally intended as a "temporary" measure, but it became popular, and so it was kept.

== Completion ==
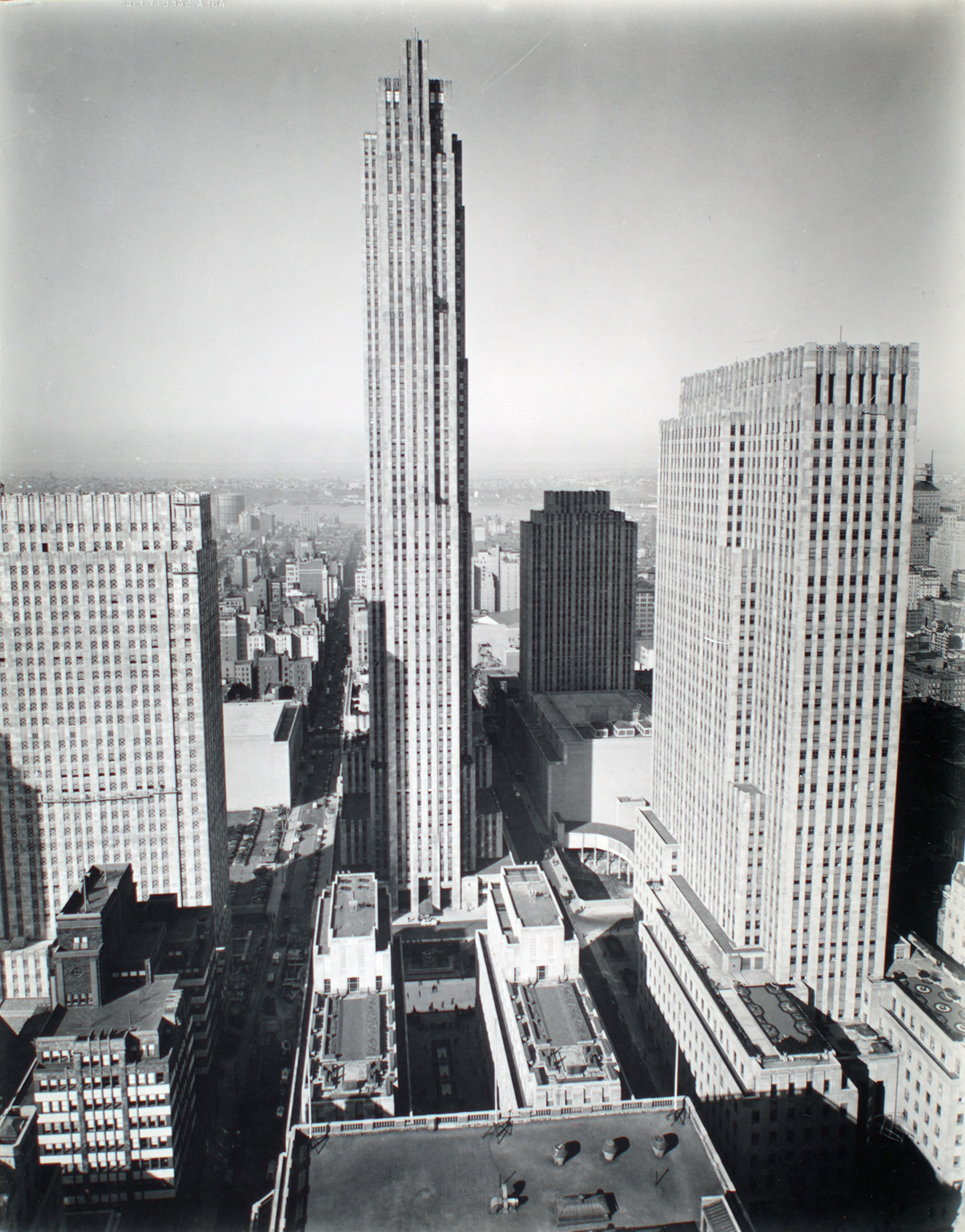
Construction progress in 1937, as seen from the east. Most of the original complex was completed, but a parking lot can be seen in the center left on the site of the future 10 Rockefeller Plaza, and the construction of 50 Rockefeller Plaza can be seen in the center right.

By 1936, ten buildings had been built and about 80% of the existing space had been rented. The buildings, constituting the first phase of construction, were the International Building; the four small retail buildings; the RKO Building; the Center Theatre; the Music Hall; the RCA Building; and the RCA Building's western extension. The total investment in the center up to that point had been about $104.6 million (about $1.8 billion in 2024 dollars), which was composed of $60 million of John Rockefeller Jr.'s money and $44.6 million from Metropolitan Life.

=== Developing the remaining empty lots ===
Rockefeller Center Inc. needed to develop the remaining empty lots of the northern and southern blocks. Notably, the southern plot was being used as a parking lot, and at the time, it was the city's largest parking facility. In 1936, Time Inc. expressed interest in moving out of their Chrysler Building offices into a larger headquarters, having just launched their Life magazine. Rockefeller Center's managers persuaded Time to move to a proposed skyscraper on part of the southern empty lot, on Rockefeller Plaza between 48th and 49th streets. The steelwork for that building was begun on September 25, 1936, and was complete by November 28, forty-three working days later. The 36-story Time & Life Building, as it was known, (Note: The "Time-Life Building" appellation would later apply to 1271 Avenue of the Americas, also in Rockefeller Center, which opened in 1959. Afterward, the original Time & Life Building became known as 1 Rockefeller Plaza.) opened on April 1, 1937, along with the final block of Rockefeller Plaza abutting the building, between 48th and 49th streets.

Rockefeller Center's executives had talks with the Associated Press for a building on the northern empty lot, which was occupied by the complex's truck delivery ramp. The lot had been reserved for the Metropolitan Opera house, but the managers could not wait anymore to develop the lot, and in 1937, the opera plans were formally scrapped. The lot had also been planned as a hotel site, but this was also deemed economically infeasible. In January 1938, the Associated Press agreed to rent four floors within the structure at 50 Rockefeller Plaza. In exchange, the building would be renamed for the company. Construction of the steelwork started in April 1938; after 29 working days, the 15-story structure was topped out on June 16. The Associated Press moved into 50 Rockefeller Plaza in December. The presence of the Associated Press and Time Inc. expanded Rockefeller Center's scope from strictly a radio-communications complex to a hub of both radio and print media. In 1938, the Associated Press opened the Guild, a newsreel theater, along the curve of the truck ramp below the building.

It was impossible to build any smaller buildings in the remainder of the complex, since the demands of tenants stipulated larger buildings. Additionally, it was no longer viable to build a system of rooftop gardens because the 15-story Associated Press Building was much taller than the 7- to 11-story-high gardens on the rest of the buildings, making it extremely hard to create a system of gardens without the use of extraordinarily steep bridges. The final plot on the southernmost block needed to be developed, and several tenants were being considered. In early 1937, the center's managers approached the Dutch government for a possible 16-story "Holland House" on the eastern part of the plot. The Dutch government did not enter into the agreement because of troubles domestically, most notably the social unrest that preceded Hitler's 1940 invasion of the Netherlands. However, the Rockefeller Center's managers were already in negotiations with Eastern Air Lines. Despite the lack of a definite tenant, the excavation of the 16-story structure at 10 Rockefeller Plaza started in October 1938, and the building was topped out by April 1939. Eastern Air Lines' CEO, Eddie Rickenbacker, did not sign a lease until June 1940. At that time, 10 Rockefeller Plaza was renamed the "Eastern Air Lines Building".

=== Change in leadership ===
The management of Rockefeller Center shifted around this time. In November 1936, John Todd was featured in two New Yorker articles that emphasized his role in the complex's construction. At the same time, Nelson was gaining clout within Rockefeller Center Inc., and he disagreed with nearly all of Todd's suggestions. Nelson's father, John, was relinquishing his responsibilities, since the Rockefeller family's youngest son David had moved out of the family home at 10 West 54th Street, and John was now focusing on his own personal life. By April 1937, Todd regretted his decision to be featured in The New Yorker. In March 1938, Nelson became the president of Rockefeller Center Inc. He then fired Todd as the complex's manager and appointed Hugh Robertson in his place. Nelson and Robertson wanted to avoid workers' strikes, which would delay the completion of construction. Nelson, Robertson, and the workers' unions agreed to a contract in which the unions would not strike, Robertson would not lock out union workers, and both would agree to arbitration if a labor dispute arose. Rockefeller Center was one of Nelson's primary business ventures until 1958, when he was elected Governor of New York.

Public relations officials were hired to advertise the different parts of the complex, such as the gardens and the plaza. A viewing platform was set up on the east side of Rockefeller Center, and the facetious "Sidewalk Superintendents' Club" was founded so the public could view construction, (Note: Sources disagree on who founded the club. Daniel Okrent gives credit for the idea to Crowell. However, Daniel Schneider of The New York Times writes that according to a Rockefeller Center press release at the time, Rockefeller Jr. was watching construction one day when a watchman told him to "move along", thus inspiring him to create the club.) with cards being issued to club members.

=== Final building ===
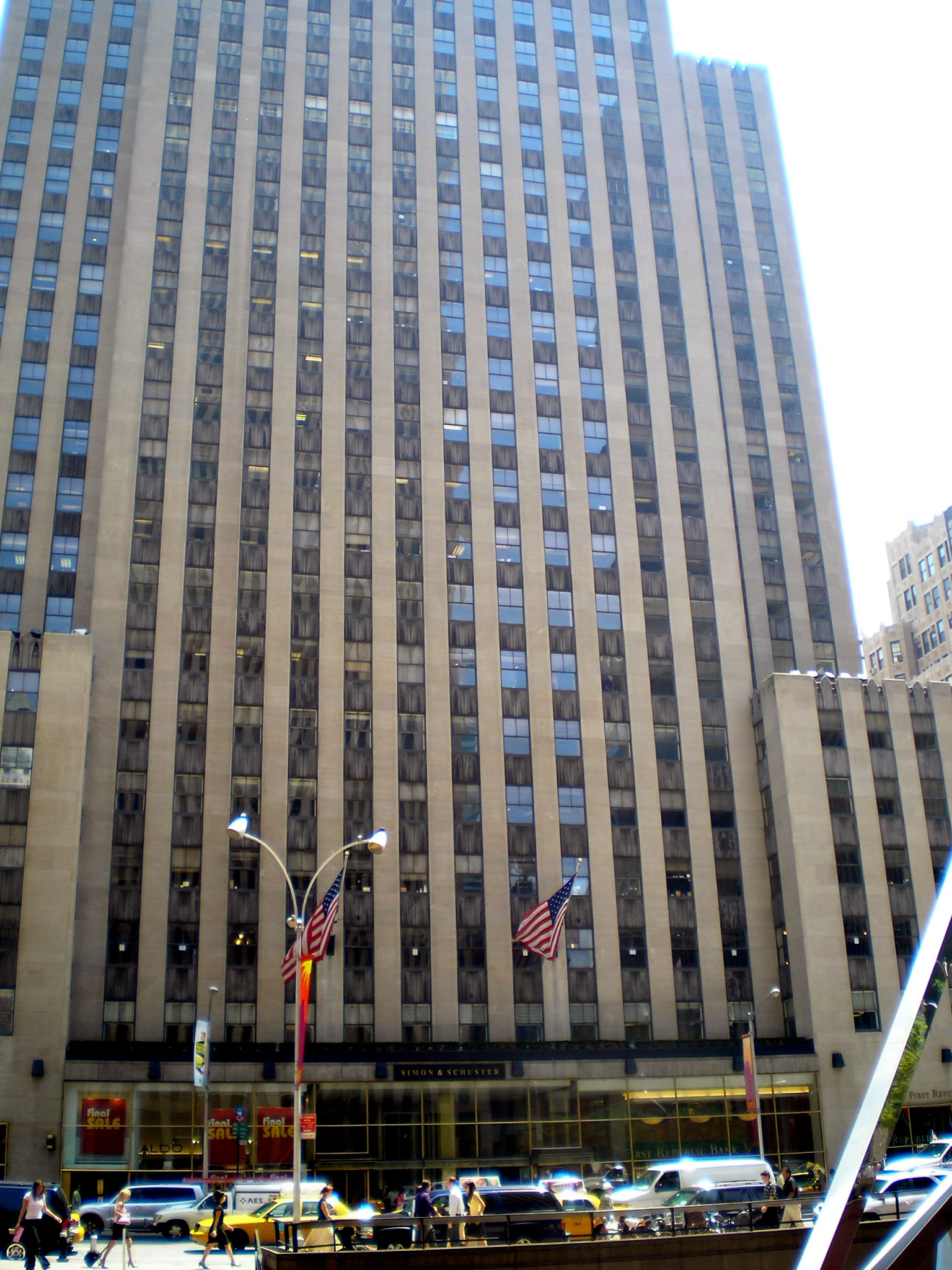
The U.S. Rubber Company Building (now Simon & Schuster Building), the last building in the original complex to be built

The western half of the southern plot was still undeveloped due to perceived negative effects of the Sixth Avenue elevated. (The elevated line was closed in early December 1938, to be replaced by the IND Sixth Avenue subway, and was razed the next year.) Ultimately, the United States Rubber Company was convinced to move from their headquarters at Columbus Circle to the proposed 1230 Avenue of the Americas building at Rockefeller Center. The company leased eleven floors in the new building, a decrease of 35,000 square feet (3,300 m^{2}) from the 12 stories that they leased at 1790 Broadway. The U.S. Rubber Company Building had been planned as a mirror of the RKO Building, but this was not possible because the symmetrical structure would have entailed constructing an expensive cantilever over the Center Theatre. Excavation of the U.S. Rubber Company Building site commenced in May 1939.

The complex was deemed complete by the end of October 1939. John Rockefeller Jr. installed the building's ceremonial final rivet on November 1, 1939, marking the completion of the original Rockefeller Center complex. The installation of the last rivet was accompanied by a celebratory speech by Rockefeller and many news accounts about the event. 10 Rockefeller Plaza, though, was not officially complete until its dedication in October 1940. Although the Dutch government had initially declined to enter an agreement to occupy 10 Rockefeller Plaza, it moved its offices-in-exile into the building once it opened.

== Later construction ==
After the original complex was finished, Rockefeller started to look for ways to expand, even though the outbreak of World War II stopped almost all civilian construction projects. In 1943, the complex's managers bought land and buildings on three street corners near the complex. Rockefeller Center unveiled plans for expansion to the southwest and north in 1944. At the time, the complex's existing rentable area totaled 5.29 million square feet (491,000 m^{2}), with 99.7% of the space being leased.

=== 1940s and 1950s ===
Esso was one of the tenants that wanted to expand, and the company signaled that it would build its own office tower if Rockefeller Center's managers did not construct a building for them. In 1944, John Rockefeller Jr. officially approved Esso's proposal to construct a building on land that Rockefeller controlled, at the north end of Rockefeller Plaza. At first, the managers of the property wanted to build a 16-story, $2 million structure on that property, but Hugh Robertson, the original complex's sole remaining architect, stated that the tower needed to be 36 floors high in order to be profitable. In February 1947, the under-construction Esso Building, at the north end of the existing property, became part of Rockefeller Center after ownership of the building was transferred from the Haswin Corporation to Rockefeller Center, Inc. The 33-story Esso Building was topped out the next month.

In 1949, in the face of a shrinking congregation, St. Nicholas Church leased the church building to the Massachusetts Mutual Life Insurance Company, who then leased three contiguous lots from Rockefeller Center for a proposed 28-story building. The Fifth Avenue facade of the new building would have a setback at the 11th floor, and the midblock facade on 49th Street would not block the view from La Maison Francaise across the street, as stipulated by an agreement with Rockefeller Center managers. The church moved out of its plot on Fifth Avenue and 48th Street, and the old church building was subsequently demolished. Construction commenced on 600 Fifth Avenue in 1950, and the tower was completed by 1952. The building was named after the Sinclair Oil Company, which leased eight floors. Although 600 Fifth Avenue was not developed by Rockefeller Center Inc., that company was allowed to dictate the general Art Deco design of the building as part of an agreement with Massachusetts Mutual. In return, Massachusetts Mutual stipulated that the building contain an entrance to Rockefeller Center's underground concourse, and that the leases for William Cromwell's remaining lots be transferred to Rockefeller Center.

The small Center Theatre was deemed redundant to Radio City Music Hall, and in its final years, had been used as an NBC and RCA broadcasting space. In 1953, NBC and RCA expanded into the office space in 30 Rockefeller Center that Sinclair had just vacated. After the broadcasting studio was abandoned, the U.S. Rubber Company indicated that it wanted to expand its office building into the space that was occupied by the underused theater. In October 1953, it was announced that the theater would be demolished. During the demolition process, the U.S. Rubber Building was put on temporary stilts, with the offices above the former theater still being occupied during the demolition process. No vestige of the former theater remains, since 1230 Avenue of the Americas' annex occupies the same space as the original building.

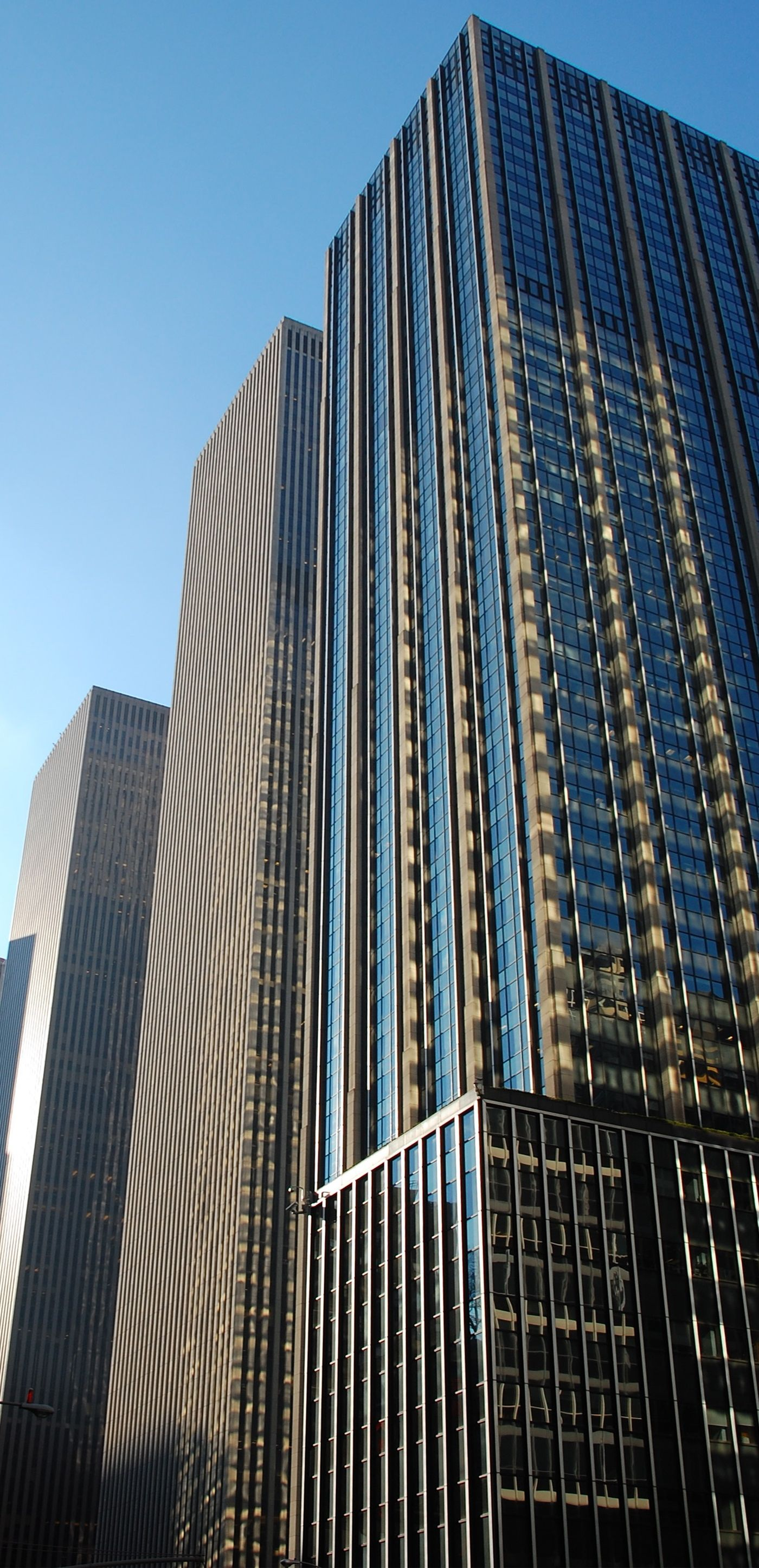
1271 Avenue of the Americas, formerly the second Time-Life Building

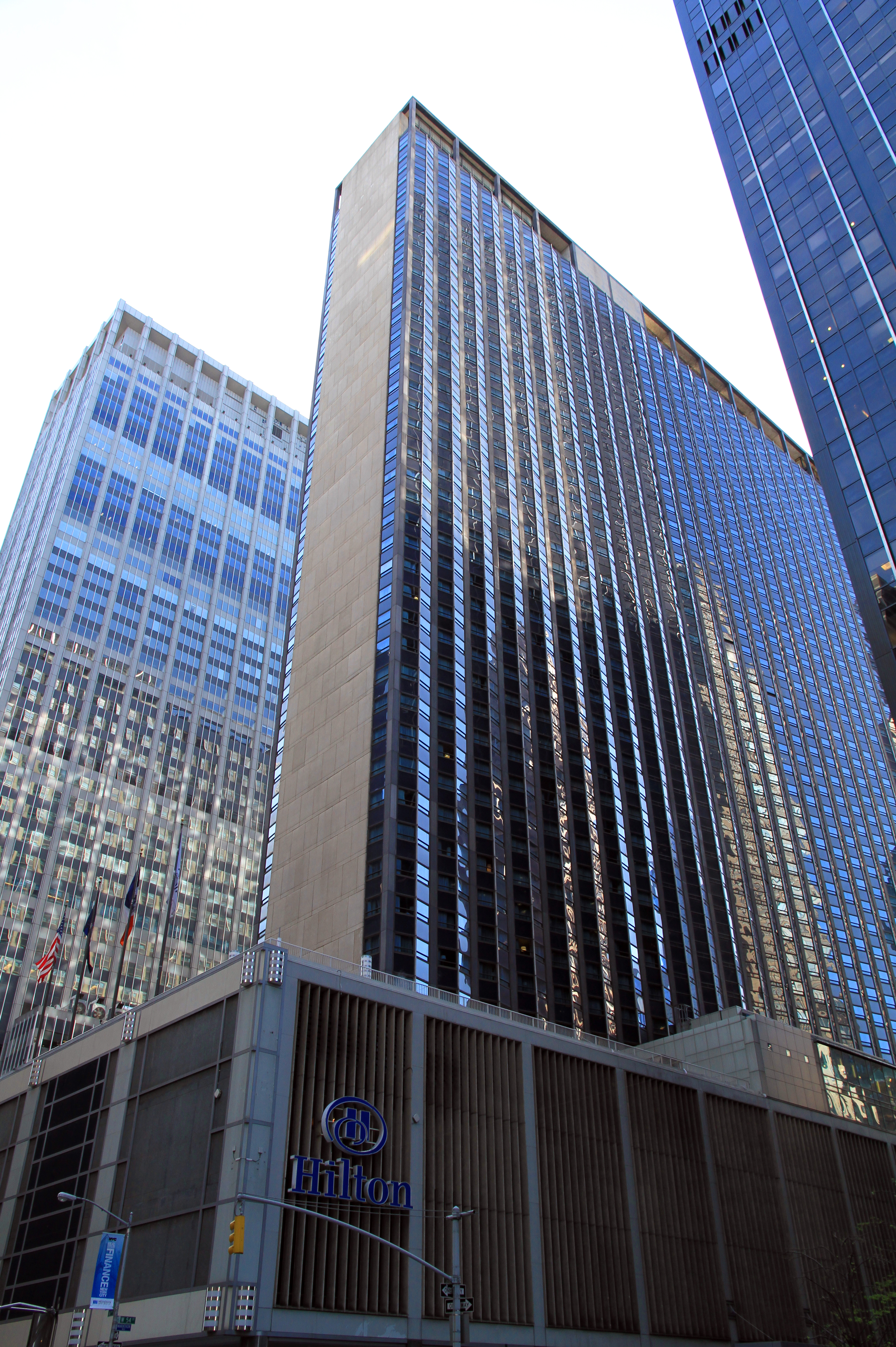
Former New York Hilton at Rockefeller Plaza, three blocks north of the actual complex

Time-Life also wanted to expand, as its existing space in 1 Rockefeller Plaza had become insufficient by 1953. In August of that year, Rockefeller Center Inc. bought a tract of land on the west side of Sixth Avenue between 50th and 51st streets. Rockefeller Center's managers originally wanted to build an extra NBC studio or a Ford vehicle showroom on the site. However, they changed their minds once they saw Time Inc.'s expansion needs: the company wanted to have its headquarters in a single building. As they would outgrow their existing space in 1 Rockefeller Plaza by 1954, the company would have to move elsewhere. Not wanting to lose Time Inc.'s tenancy, the complex's managers hired Harrison & Abramovitz, composed of Wallace Harrison and Max Abramovitz, to create plans for a building on the newly acquired plot that could house both NBC and Time. NBC later dropped out of the deal because its CEO, David Sarnoff, dissented.

In 1956, two years after the demolition of the Center Theatre, officials announced the construction of a new tower, the Time-Life Building, on the western side of Sixth Avenue between 50th and 51st Streets. The 500-foot (150 m), $7 million building ($119.7 in 2024 dollars) would include connections to the existing passageway system and to the Roxy Theater directly to its west. The tower would rise as a 48-story slab, with a plaza to the east and an eight-story annex along its western and northern sides. One of Rockefeller Center's subsidiaries, Westprop Inc., bought the air rights to the original Roxy Theater next door so that the new tower could conform to the Zoning Resolution of 1916. Time Inc. and Rockefeller Center formed a joint venture, Rock-Time Inc., which would share the tower's rent income between them. Construction on the Time-Life Building's steelwork started in April 1958, and the structure topped out in November of that year. The cornerstone of the building was laid in June 1959, after the building's structure had been completed, and the first tenants began moving into the tower in December 1959.

During this time, plans called for Rockefeller Center to expand northward. Rockefeller Center, Uris Buildings Corporation, and Webb and Knapp formed another joint venture, Rock-Uris Corp., to construct a hotel to the west of 75 Rockefeller Center. However, Webb and Knapp faced monetary shortages, and the joint venture found that a hotel was not the most profitable use of the land. The joint venture instead decided to construct a glass-and-concrete 43-story office building on the site, with connections to the complex's underground concourse. In 1961, the building was named after Sperry Corporation, which leased eight floors in the future building. The planned hotel was moved to another site two blocks north, on the west side of Sixth Avenue between 53rd and 54th Streets. This became the New York Hilton at Rockefeller Center, which opened in 1963. The hotel's name was misleading because it was outside the complex and not connected to the underground mall. The mall could not be extended anyway because the 53rd Street subway was in the way. Further expansion of Rockefeller Center on the west side of Sixth Avenue, between the Hilton and the new Time-Life Building, was not possible because the Equitable Life Assurance Society had built a tower in between the two properties.

=== 1960s and 1970s ===
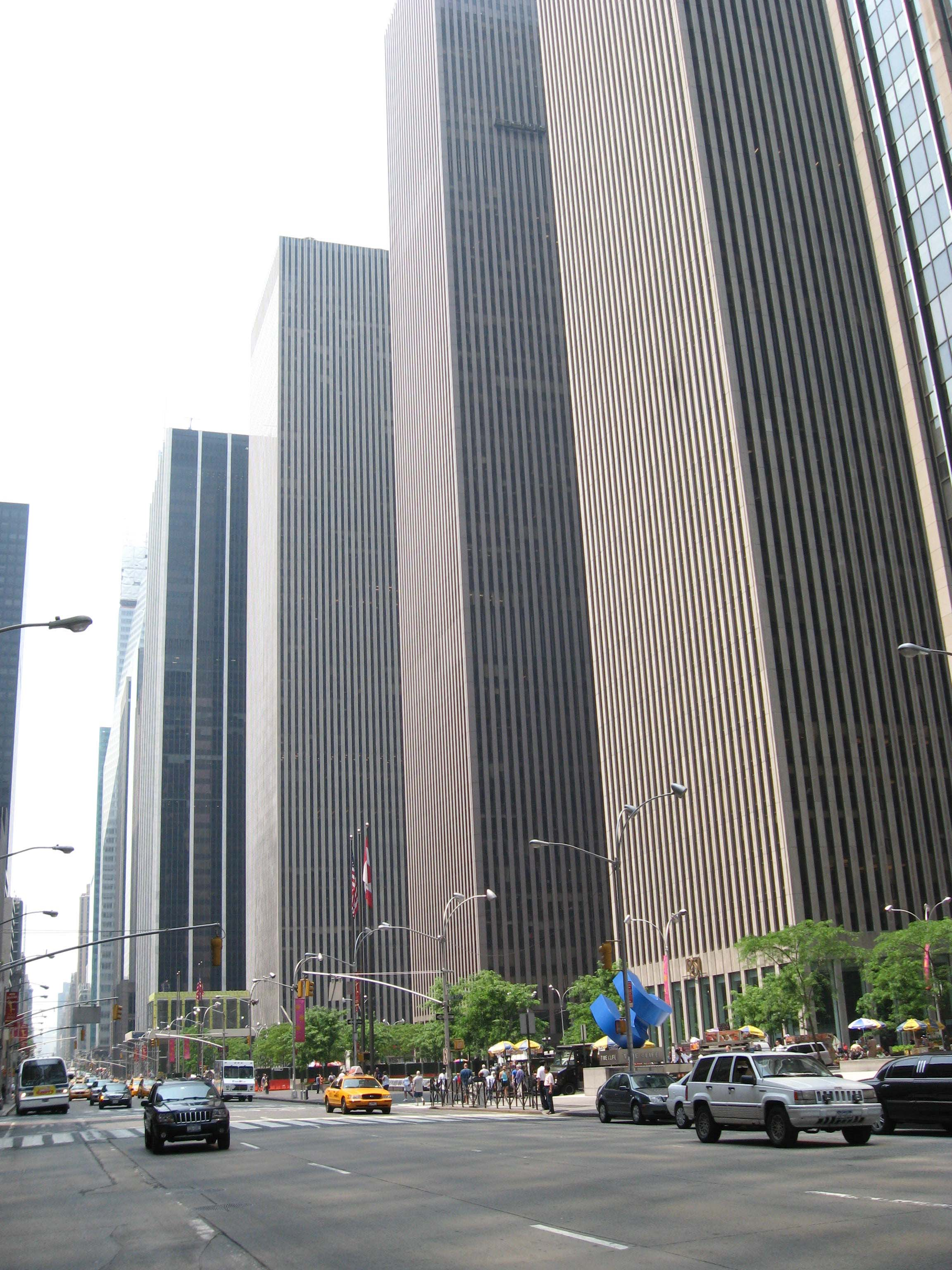
The three buildings at 1211–1251 Avenue of the Americas were opened from 1971 through 1974.

In 1963, officials from Esso approached Gustav Eyssell, who had been Rockefeller Center Inc.'s president since Hugh Robertson had stepped down in 1948. Esso proposed that Eyssell approve another building for the company, which had outgrown the space that it already occupied in Rockefeller Center. Eyssell seriously considered the proposal because the complex did not want to lose Esso's tenancy, and because the complex's existing tenants were requesting a combined 2 million ft^{2} (190,000 m^{2}) of extra space. Rockefeller Center's managers re-hired Harrison & Abramovitz to design three new towers on the west side of Sixth Avenue, with one tower on each of the blocks between 47th and 50th Streets. The managers purchased the land for the three proposed buildings in private. Simultaneously, they consulted with large potential tenants, and eventually managed to sign Esso, McGraw-Hill, and Celanese as the main tenants for the buildings. Under the plan, Esso (later renamed Exxon) would move into the northernmost tower at 1251 Avenue of the Americas, while McGraw-Hill would occupy the center tower at 1221, and Celanese would have the southernmost tower at 1211. These were called the "XYZ Buildings" because the three towers were so similar that their placements could be interchanged.

Harrison & Abramowitz's plans were influenced by several design elements. Most importantly, the firm wished to include plazas in front of each of the new Rockefeller Center buildings, drawing from their recent design for the Lincoln Center for the Performing Arts on the Upper West Side, which contained several buildings around a central plaza. (Note: Lincoln Center was incidentally the site of a new Metropolitan Opera House. The original plan for the new Met had helped stimulate the development of Rockefeller Center.) The new Rockefeller Center buildings' front plazas would serve as large gathering spaces, similar to the lower plaza in the original complex. The original Rockefeller Center did not include plazas along Sixth Avenue because the elevated line would have overshadowed these spaces, but now that the Sixth Avenue elevated had been demolished, the new buildings' plazas would add open space to the Sixth Avenue side of the complex. As a bonus, the plazas canceled out the imposing visual effects of the buildings on the avenue's east side, which rose straight up from their property lines and made for a cliff-like effect. Finally, per a 1961 revision to the 1916 Zoning Resolution, the inclusion of public plazas would allow the towers' builders to include more office space in each building.

Unlike the old complex, which had to satisfy John D. Rockefeller Jr.'s aesthetic desires, the new towers did not need to be excessively beautiful: the present executives of Rockefeller Center were more concerned with the buildings' functionality. However, the proposed design of the new towers strained relations between Harrison and Nelson Rockefeller. This arose from the media's harsh reviews of the proposed expansion, which was described by one critic as "the sinister Stonehenge of economic man".

There were several impediments to the start of construction. Foremost among them was the fact that the proposed floor area of the new buildings was greater than the amount allowed under the 1961 resolution. The Urban Design Group, a division of the New York City Department of City Planning, suggested that the towers include an enclosed walkway with retail space, as well as a movie theater in one of the buildings. The McGraw-Hill Building was to include a basement planetarium with a dome above ground level, which would be operated by a subsidiary, while the Celanese Building was to contain the theater. Neither of these attractions were actually built: the planetarium space was occupied by a small theater after McGraw-Hill had sold its planetarium subsidiary, while the theater plan was scrapped due to a lack of funding and a decline in the area's theater industry. The start of construction was delayed for several years due to these bureaucratic requests. The city finally approved the project after Rockefeller Center Inc. promised to build the enclosed walkway west of the Celanese Building as well as two parks west of the Exxon and McGraw-Hill Buildings.

Plans for the new buildings were announced on a staggered schedule from 1967 to 1970. The Exxon Building was announced in August 1967, followed by the McGraw-Hill Building in November 1967 and the Celanese Building in 1970. Complications arose when William A. Ruben, a resident of 132 West 48th Street who lived on the planned Celanese Building site west of Sixth Avenue, refused to move from his home. He finally agreed to move, in July 1968, when he received compensation of over $22,000 (equivalent to $203,700 in 2025). The construction process was further hampered by labor strikes. During mid-1969, workers on the Exxon and McGraw-Hill Buildings went on strike. Three years later in July 1972, construction workers at several projects across the city, including the Celanese Building, went on strike for over a month.

The Exxon Building, the northernmost of the three towers, was the first building to be completed, in 1971. The 54-story tower had 2,101,115 square feet (195,200 m^{2}) of office space. This was followed by the McGraw-Hill Building, the central tower, in 1973. This 51-story building had 2,199,982 square feet (204,385 m^{2}) of office space. The Celanese Building, the southernmost tower, was the last to open, in 1974. The 45-story building had 1,854,912 square feet (172,327 m^{2}) of office space. After the completion of the final building, the center was spread out across 22 acres (8.9 ha) of land and contained around 17 million ft^{2} (1.6 million m^{2}) of office space across 19 buildings.
