= American Radiator Building =

Skyscraper in Manhattan, New York

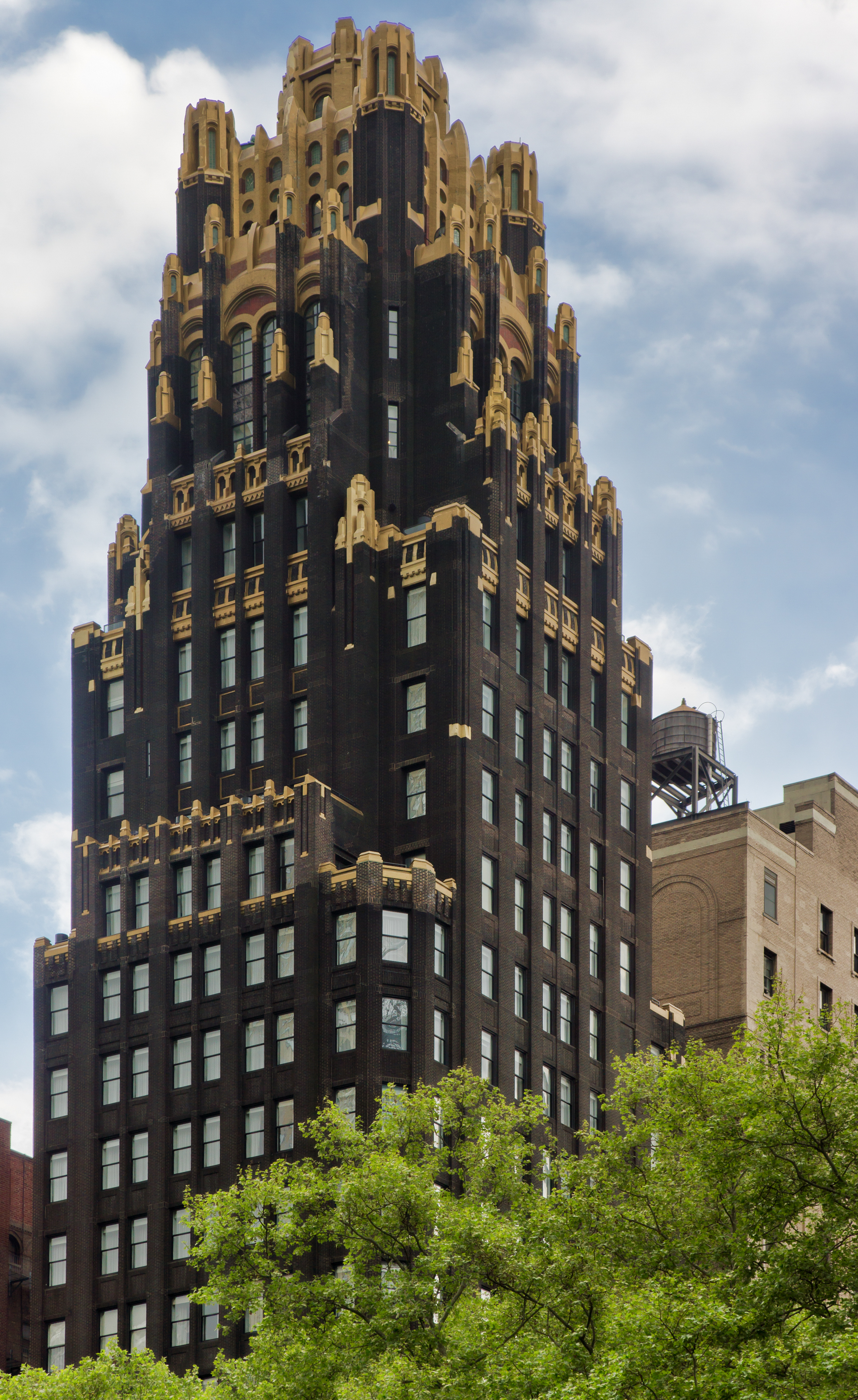
- Seen from Bryant Park
- Former names: American Standard Building

General information
- Architectural style: Neo-Gothic; Art Deco
- Location: 40–52 West 40th Street; Manhattan, New York, U.S.
- Coordinates: 40°45′10.1″N 73°59′01.6″W
- Construction started: 1923
- Completed: 1924; 102 years ago
- Renovated: 1936–1937; 1998–2001
- Owner: Bryant Park Hotel (original); City University of New York (annex)

Height
- Roof: 338 ft (103 m)

Technical details
- Floor count: 23
- Floor area: 77,000 ft^{2} (7,200 m^{2}) (original); 75,000 to 91,000 ft^{2} (7,000 to 8,500 m^{2}) (annex)

Design and construction
- Architects: Raymond Hood and André Fouilhoux
- American Radiator Building
- U.S. National Register of Historic Places
- New York State Register of Historic Places
- New York City Landmark
- Location: 40 West 40th Street; Manhattan, New York City
- Area: 7,604 ft^{2} (706.4 m^{2})
- NRHP reference No.: 80002663
- NYSRHP No.: 06101.000631
- NYCL No.: 0878

Significant dates
- Added to NRHP: May 7, 1980
- Designated NYSRHP: June 23, 1980
- Designated NYCL: November 12, 1974

The American Radiator Building (also known as the American Standard Building) is an early skyscraper at 40 West 40th Street, just south of Bryant Park, in the Midtown Manhattan neighborhood of New York City, New York, U.S. It was designed by Raymond Hood and André Fouilhoux in the Gothic and Art Deco styles for the American Radiator Company. The original section of the American Radiator Building, a 338 ft-tall (103 m), 23-story tower, was completed in 1924. A five-story annex, to the west of the original tower, was built from 1936 to 1937.

The original structure consists of an eighteen-story tower above a base of five stories, while the western annex only rises five stories. The American Radiator Building's facade is made predominantly of black brick. Gold-colored decorations are used on the building's setbacks and pinnacles. Hood had intended for the original structure to be a standalone shaft, requiring the building to be set back from the lot line and reducing the maximum amount of space available. Inside, the basement, first, and second floors were originally designed as exhibition showrooms, while the upper stories served as office space.

The building was completed five years before the American Radiator Company merged with Standard Sanitary Manufacturing Company to form American Radiator and Standard Sanitary Corporation, later known as American Standard. American Standard sold the building in 1988 to a Japanese company. The main building was sold in 1998 to Philip Pilevsky, who opened the Bryant Park Hotel there in 2001. The annex operated as the Katharine Gibbs School from 2001 to 2009 and was converted into the City University of New York's Guttman Community College in 2012. The American Radiator Building is a New York City designated landmark and is on the National Register of Historic Places.

== Site ==
The American Radiator Building is at 40 West 40th Street in the Midtown Manhattan neighborhood of New York City, New York, U.S. The original section of the building occupies a rectangular land lot with a frontage of 77 ft (23 m) along 40th Street, a depth of 98 ft (30 m), and an area of 7,604 ft^{2} (706.4 m^{2}). There is also a five-story annex at 50 West 40th Street, west of the original tower. The annex's lot covers 11,455 ft^{2} (1,064.2 m^{2}) with a frontage of 72 ft (22 m) along 40th Street, extending 197 ft (60 m) to the rear of the block at 39th Street.

The American Radiator Building is on 40th Street, which forms the southern border of Bryant Park, and between Fifth and Sixth Avenues. On the same block are the Engineers' Club Building, The Bryant, and 452 Fifth Avenue to the east; the Engineering Societies' Building and the Haskins & Sells Building to the south; and Bryant Park Studios to the west. Other nearby places include the New York Public Library Main Branch across 40th Street to the north, as well as the Lord & Taylor Building to the southeast. The surrounding block of 40th Street had contained brownstone row houses through the 1920s, before they were replaced by the American Radiator Building and several other multi-story structures. The site of the annex was occupied by six houses at 46–52 West 40th Street and 39–43 West 39th Street until the 1930s.

== Architecture ==
The American Radiator Building was designed by Raymond Hood and J. André Fouilhoux, of the firm Hood, Godley, and Fouilhoux, in a mixture of the Gothic Revival and Art Deco styles. It was completed in 1924 as the headquarters of the American Radiator Company. Rene Paul Chambellan, a frequent collaborator of Hood and his associate John Mead Howells, created the ornamentation and sculptures. Numerous other contractors were hired for the construction. (Note: The contractors included: Hegeman-Harris Company, general contractor; Weiskopf and Pickworth, structural engineers; Hay Foundry and Iron Works, steel contractor; Meyer, Strong & Jones Inc., mechanical and electrical consultants; Sterling Bronze Company, lighting contractor; McGowan & Connolly Company, interior marble contractor; John Leslie, granite supplier; S. Haskel & Sons Inc., granite installer; Washington Concrete Corporation, cement contractor)

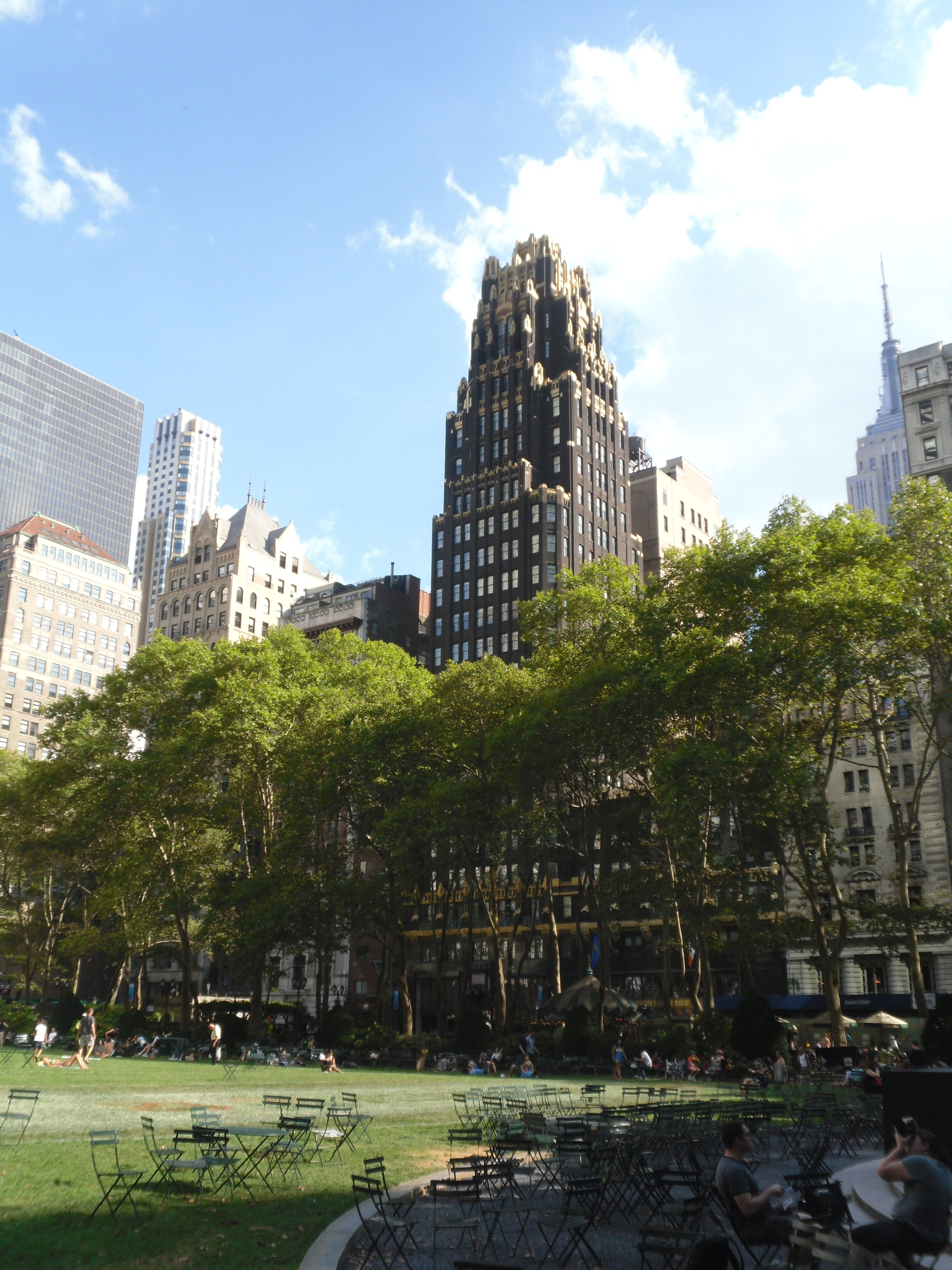
Seen at center from Bryant Park

Only the base of the building was designed in a strictly Gothic style, but the building as a whole contains abstract ornamentation, similar to those used on the Bush Tower and Woolworth Building. The American Radiator Building's massing is based on Eliel Saarinen's unbuilt competition entry for Chicago's Tribune Tower, augmented by a strong use of color. The building's design was also inspired by those of two nearby buildings: the base-and-tower massing of the Candler Building and the Gothic details of the Bush Tower. When the building was completed, Hood proclaimed that it was "in some respects a departure from the ordinary high building".

=== Form ===
The original structure measuring 338 ft (103 m) tall consists of an eighteen-story tower above a base of five stories. The western annex only rises five stories. According to Architectural Forum magazine, the lower floors "form a projecting screen, back of which rises the towering bulk of the building". The writer Eric Nash described the building as the "first true expression of the Art Deco skyscraper silhouette".

The original tower contains several setbacks to comply with the 1916 Zoning Resolution. The first setback is on the 4th floor, and there are also setbacks on the 12th, 17th, 22nd, and 23rd floors. Above the 15th story are indentations; those on the northern side of the building are beveled to make the tower appear like a shaft. Within these indentations are narrow window bays. The shaft-like design permitted the tower to be illuminated by natural light from all sides. The shaft-like form was not applied consistently; the rear conformed to the city's setback requirement for backyards, so the south facade of the base and tower are continuous.

Hood had intended for the original structure to be a standalone shaft. This required the building to be set back from the lot line, therefore reducing the maximum amount of space available in the building. Conversely, the slight setbacks and the indented corners ensure there would be some air between the tower and all adjacent buildings. The presence of the western annex also protected views from that direction. According to Hood, his team shaped "a small plasteline model into the maximum model that the zoning law permitted", which was similar to the structure's final form. Hood and his client only disagreed over whether the building should be more than twenty stories high and whether additional frontage should be used for the base.

=== Facade ===
The American Radiator Building was designed in a black and gold color scheme. These specific colors came from a "somewhat offhand" suggestion made during an early discussion with Hood and Fouilhoux's team. It is not known who exactly suggested the black and gold colors, but architectural writer Walter Littlefield Creese says it may have been Hood's friend, architect Joseph Urban. Hood used the black and gold palette because he believed that conventional office buildings, with their white-masonry facades and dark glass windows, were monotonous. He had compared such windows to "waffles" and wished to find a color to make the window openings more conspicuous. After the tower's completion, Hood anticipated that additional colorful skyscrapers would be developed in New York City.

The primary color of black was used to signify coal, while gold-coated decorations were used to symbolize fire. The "gold" was actually bronze powder placed on cast stone, a technique which was devised after a number of experiments by Hood and Fouilhoux's team. Hood had visited Brussels just before the American Radiator Building was built, and he had realized how golden colors had made "gloomy and dingy" buildings stand out, especially if their facades were darker.

==== Base ====
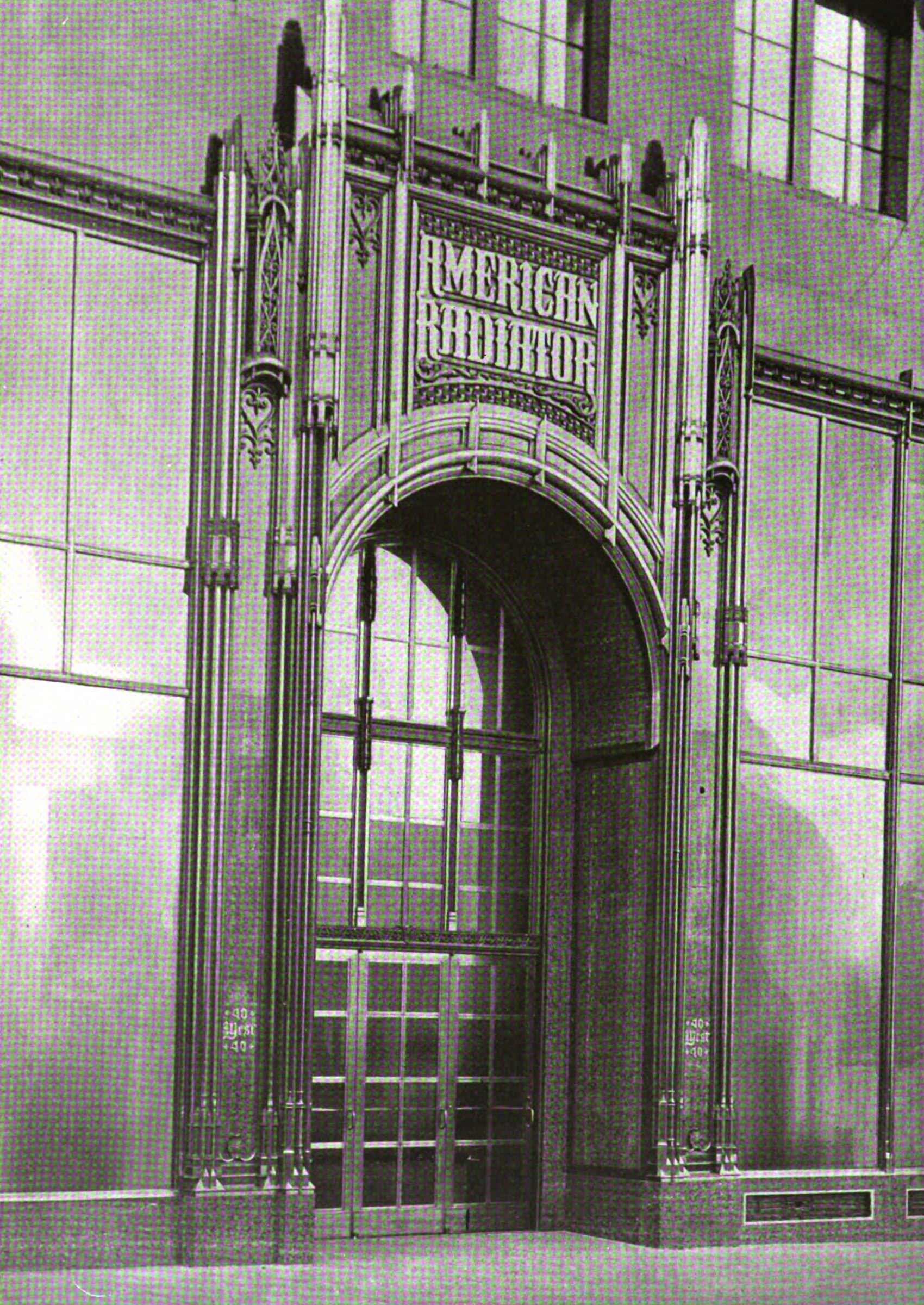
Early image of the entrance

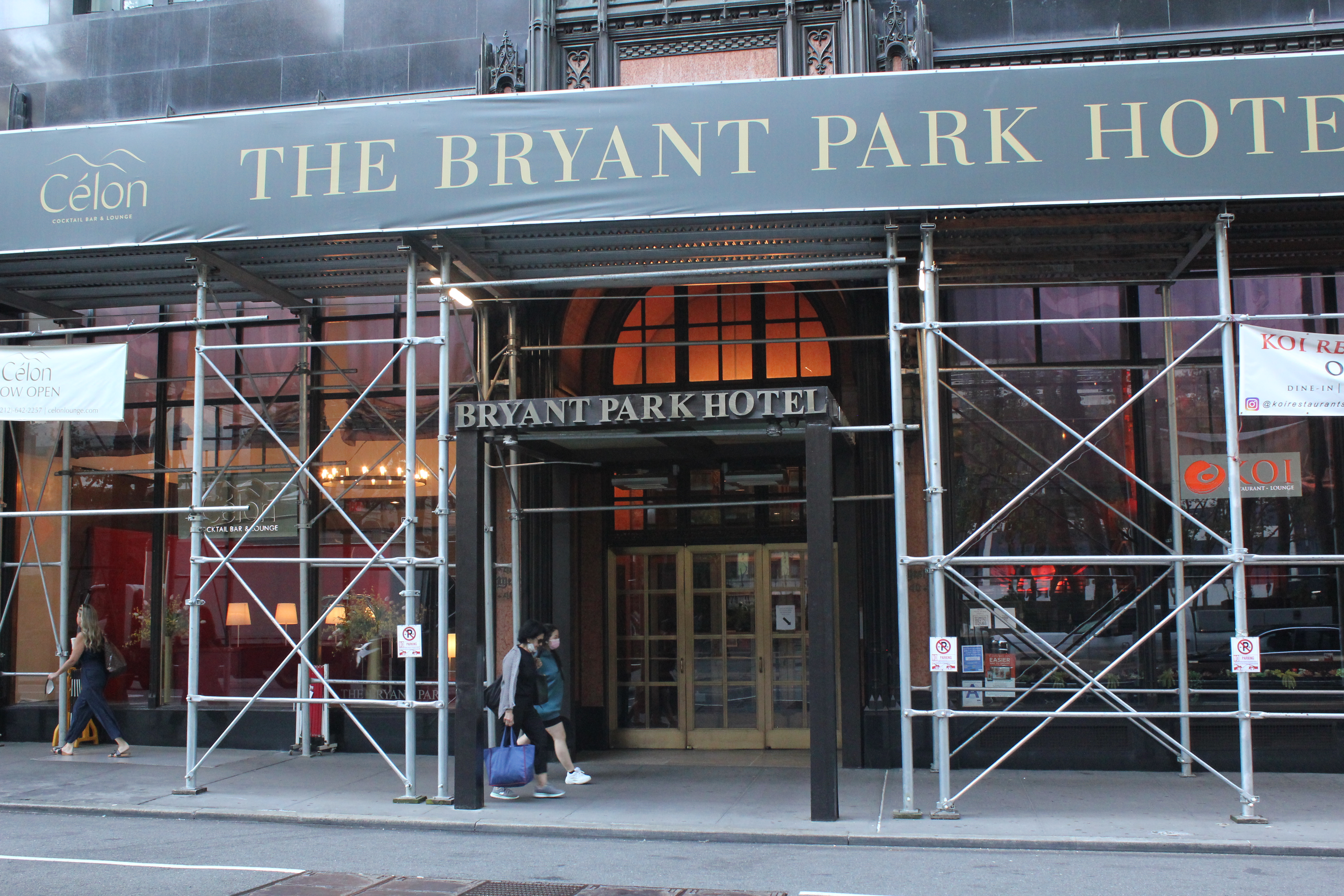
The modern hotel entrance, covered by scaffolding

The original building's base is clad with polished black Swedish granite. The windows of the former ground-level showrooms contain large plate-glass panes with thin vertical bronze mullions in front of them. The spaces below the windows were originally clad in red Verona marble. The main entrance is a round-arched opening between the two original showroom windows. The western edge of the portal contains a plaque with the letters "1924 / Raymond Hood / Architect" embossed in bronze; the plaque originally contained a four-leaf clover, which has since fallen off. There are modified Gothic-style bronze pinnacles above the entrance opening, as well as a bronze frame around it.

A cornice, with corbels and modillions, runs above the second story. Originally, there were nine corbels, of which six contained ornamental figures depicting negative human emotions. (Note: According to The New York Herald, New York Tribune, these figures resembled anger, drunkenness, revolt, lust, fury, and hatred.) According to the New York Herald Tribune, the corbels were inspired by caricatures of medieval grotesques. The grotesques on the building were designed in a whimsical manner, with figures that included a pipe fitter with a wrench.

The annex is designed in a similar style to the original building's base, with polished black granite on the first two stories. The annex has similar plate-glass panes and bronze mullions to the original building, but it has a revolving door at the center. The corbeled cornice above the second story of the annex is similar to that in the original building.

==== Tower ====
The original building is clad with black brick starting on the third floor; the use of brick was unusual for skyscrapers of the 1920s, which tended to use stone. The third story consists of bays with one or two windows each, as well as carved railings at the bottom of each window and gold spandrel panels above each window. These bays are separated by slightly projecting black-brick pilasters, which in turn have gold pinnacles. This window pattern is repeated in the annex's third floor. The fourth and fifth floors of the annex are slightly set back from the first three stories and contain a facade of black brick, with a gold cornice on top. Projecting brick piers divide these stories into several bays, each with double windows.

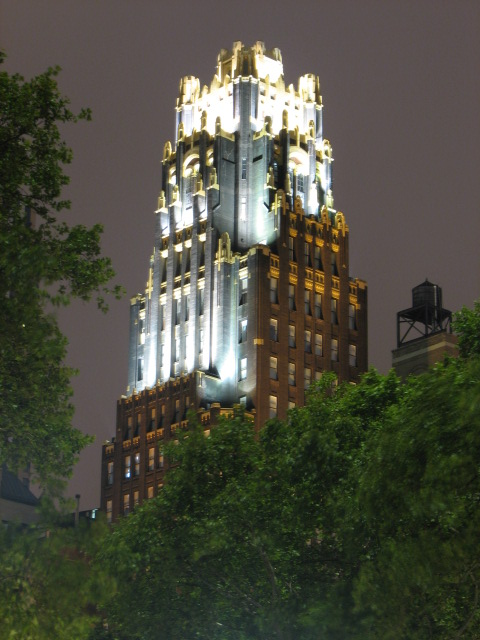
Crown illuminated at night

The tower stories contain projecting bricks in various places, which give it a textured quality. Dark red, light red, amber, and white lights were placed on the setbacks to provide nighttime illumination. Cornices wrap around the building at the 16th and 20th stories. The facade contains various pinnacles and peaks clad with gold, which one publication compared to turrets in old English castles. These ornamental features are actually made of terracotta but are covered in gold leaf. Gold is also used on corbels, cornices, and the spandrels between stories, and the Gothic-style pinnacles at the top of the building are ornamented with gold leaf as well. When the building was being completed, Hood wrote for Architectural Forum that "false tops have gone out of vogue for office buildings, as well as the fashion of putting an ornamental front on one or two sides of a building".

The roof consists of a tank surrounding a chimney and installed on a frame. At night, the gold-leafed terracotta decorations of the American Radiator Building are illuminated to draw attention to the shaft. Hood chose not to illuminate the middle stories of the tower "to avoid any simulation of daylight effects". The nighttime lighting gives the crown the appearance of a heated radiator. Other parts of the building were sometimes illuminated as well; in 1928, eleven stories were lit in the shape of a cross to raise awareness for tuberculosis management.

=== Features ===
Initially, the building was designed with 77,000 ft^{2} (7,200 m^{2}) of floor area. The annex has either 75,000 ft^{2} (7,000 m^{2}) or 91,000 ft^{2} (8,500 m^{2}) of space; according to the New York City Department of City Planning, the annex's gross floor area is 91,000 square feet. The building's original heating system consisted of radiators that were linked to a boiler room in the basement, which itself was available for public view. The ventilation system includes an exhaust shaft that led to a penthouse at the building's roof. Power is drawn directly from electric mains under the street. Twenty-five hundred lights were used in the interior, as well as motors capable of 230 hp (170 kW).

When the building was completed, the elevators used then-innovative technology. For example, the elevator cabs could automatically align to the floor level, and the elevator gates could be opened when the passenger pushed a button, instead of having to be shoved aside manually. Originally, the building had three primary elevators that ran from ground level only to the 16th story, while the top stories were served by a separate elevator. When the Bryant Park Hotel was constructed, elevator shafts were installed to transport guests directly from the lobby to the top stories.

==== Lower stories ====
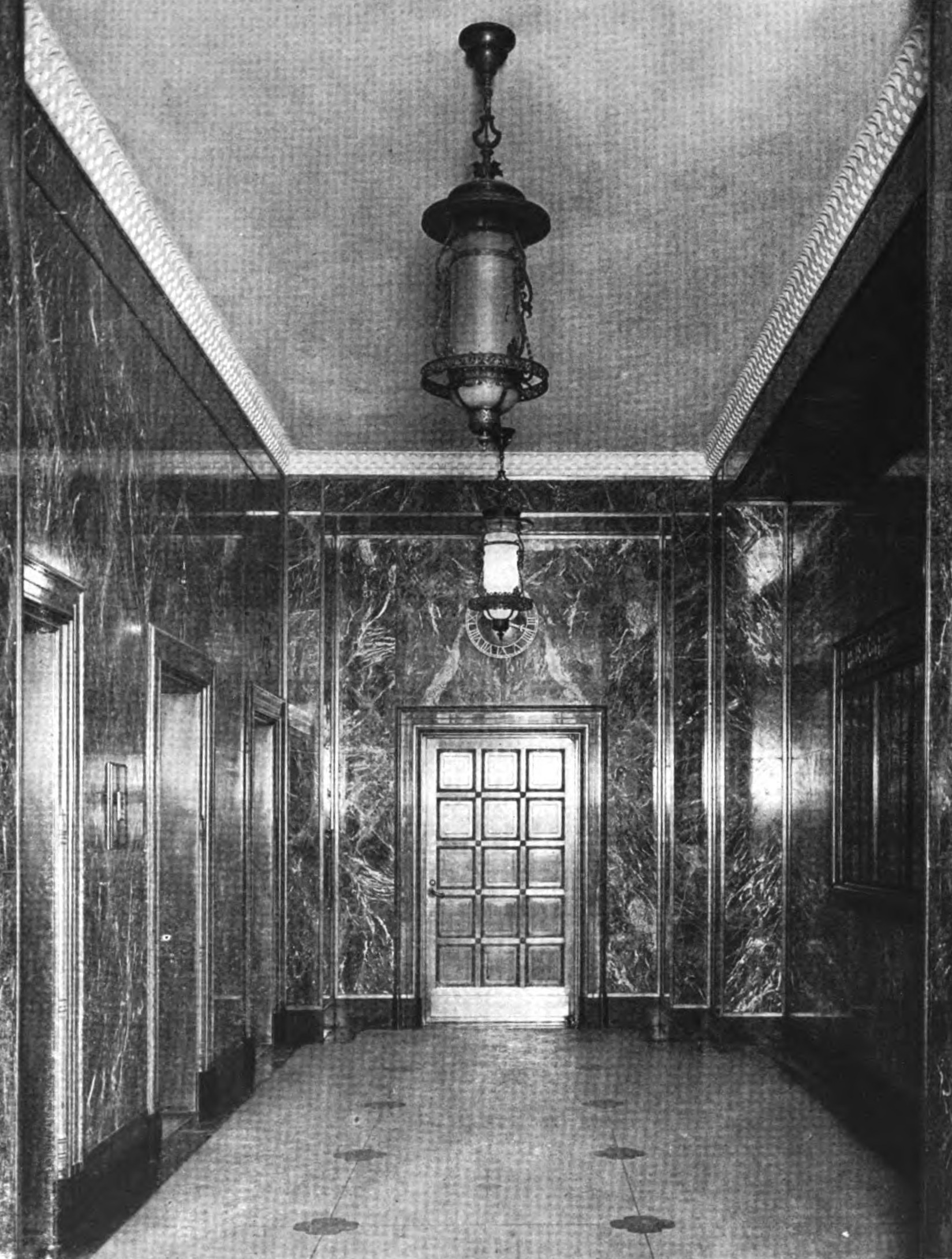
Early photo of the elevator lobby

Originally, the basement had low-arched spaces, which served as showrooms for furnaces and boilers. The foundation consists of piers extending 8 to 22 ft (2.4 to 6.7 m) below the basement floor; the deepest foundation pier is about 40 ft (12 m) below street level. The basement includes a 73-seat screening room, which was created when the Bryant Park Hotel was constructed within the building in the late 1990s and early 2000s. The screening room was dug 45 ft (14 m) deep into the bedrock. Because of the high water table of the area, the excavation of the screening room entailed installing several pumps and drainage systems.

As designed, the American Radiator Building's main entrance led to a vestibule, which in turn led to a corridor, an elevator lobby with three elevators on the left (east) wall, and a central staircase. The vestibule had heavy glass and bronze doors leading to the lobby. The lobby was clad in Monte Cenrato marble panels from South America. The wall panels were encircled with brass moldings, while the marble on the floor was surrounded with brass trips. The cornice was decorated with antique-looking ornamental plaster.

Leading off either wall of the corridor were showrooms. Stairs led up from the west showroom to several intermediate display levels, while stairs led down from the east showroom to display level A1. This arrangement, according to Hood, was intended to give "more space in each store without sensibly leaving a general main level". Due to the layout, only the eastern showroom had a mezzanine above it. Bent girders were installed to support the different levels of showrooms, and the structural steel around the elevators were made of thin single-webs. Showrooms were also placed in the ground floor of the annex. When the main building was converted to a hotel in 2001, the lower stories were reconfigured and a restaurant space was created on the ground floor. In addition, two bars, a few shops, and a gym were created within the lower stories, including one bar in the basement. The annex's ground-floor showroom became part of the Katharine Gibbs School.

==== Upper stories ====
The tower section of the American Radiator Building measures 79 by 63 ft (24 by 19 m). It is designed so that 90 percent of all office space was at most 25 ft (7.6 m) from a window. The office spaces were fairly small, since elevators and stairs took up much of the space; on average, each of the upper floors covered only 5,600 ft^{2} (520 m^{2}). A sample floor plan for the 12th through 15th floors indicates that three elevators and two sets of stairs were clustered in a service core near the east wall. Each of these floors also had men's and women's toilets. A smokestack was placed right behind the elevators. At stories with setbacks, there are tiled terraces. As of 2021, the upper stories contain 125 guestrooms for the Bryant Park Hotel.

On the 5th through 17th stories, there are no columns at the tower's front corners because of the presence of the indented corners. As a result, these corners are supported by cantilevered girders. Furthermore, while the front and rear walls were already stiffened at their setbacks, the east and west walls had to be stiffened with gusset plates. Most of the transverse girders in the tower are made of two I-beams, except at setbacks, where deeper built-up girders are used. Four interior columns, placed within the service core, rise the height of the tower, leaving the remainder of each floor as a column-free space. The tower's other girders are built with a maximum depth of 20 in (510 mm). The rear has a setback of 10 ft (3.0 m) at the 12th floor and 9 ft (2.7 m) at the 17th floor; two of the interior columns terminate above the 17th story. Structurally, the first 17 floors can support live loads of up to 120 psf (5.7 kPa), while the 18th floor and above can support 60 psf (2.9 kPa).

At the 21st and 22nd floors, there are girders that transfer weight between the centers of different columns. There are heavy girders on the 22nd through 24th floors, which support equipment on the roof. The roof had a spiral stair leading to a water tank, fan room, corridor, and another space.

== History ==
Raymond Hood was a relatively obscure architect when, in 1921, he collaborated with John Mead Howells in an architectural design competition, submitting a successful proposal for the Tribune Tower. According to one author, Hood became a prominent architect "from almost complete obscurity and literally overnight". At the time, architects were using classical Beaux-Arts design elements, which were not commonly used on tall structures. Additionally, by the early 1920s, American Radiator Company president Clarence Mott Woolley wanted a building that not only advertised the firm itself but also provided space to showcase its products.

=== Development ===
In 1923, the American Radiator Company started developing a new office building in New York City. The American Radiator Building was only the second skyscraper Hood designed, after the Tribune Tower. The design and construction of the original skyscraper took only thirteen months. The design process started in April 1923, and the steel superstructure was constructed from August 22 to November 21 of the same year. According to Hood, the exterior design had still not been finalized at one-eighth scale until two months after the building's steel was ordered. The color scheme was not finalized until some of the steel had been erected. When the building reached the 17th floor, Hood was still determining how the top of the building could be constructed at one-half scale. The American Radiator Company announced it would occupy the building in January 1924, upon which the building was scheduled to be completed that May.

Initially, the American Radiator Company occupied 22,000 ft^{2} (2,000 m^{2}). The company's space included one storefront, part of the 3rd and 4th floors, and the 16th through 24th floors. A.D. Juilliard signed a lease for 17,000 ft^{2} (1,600 m^{2}) for a store at the base in August 1924. The lease included the multi-tiered storefront on the ground and 2nd stories, as well as the remainder of the 3rd and 4th floors, all connected by a private elevator. Space was also leased to office tenants, such as the Association of Edison Illuminating Companies' electric laboratories, the Clarage Fan Company, and the American Engineering Company. Hood and Fouilhoux's architecture firm also took space in the American Radiator Building.

The American Radiator Company acquired a 12-story building at 35–39 West 39th Street, occupying a 44 by 100 ft (13 by 30 m) lot behind the company's tower, in 1928. This sale was intended to protect the views from the American Radiator Building. The next year, American Radiator Company merged with Standard Sanitary Manufacturing Company to form American Radiator and Standard Sanitary Corporation, later American Standard. Consequently, the structure was renamed the American Standard Building. American Standard had hired Hood in 1929 to design a westward extension of its tower. Hood drew plans for a tower that would be two and a half times the original building's height, with a black-and-gold facade topped by a pinnacle. These plans were not executed due to financial issues caused by the Great Depression.

=== Expansion and mid-20th century ===
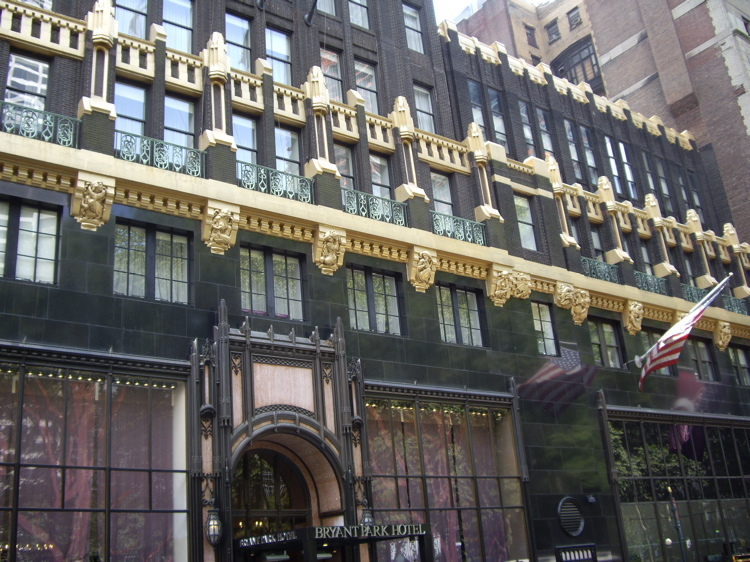
40th Street facade, with the original building at left and the annex at right

In February 1936, American Standard paid the Bowery Savings Bank $500,000 for the six adjacent houses at 46–52 West 40th Street and 39–43 West 39th Street. The structures were planned to be replaced with a showroom annex of no more than six stories. The new showrooms of the American Radiator Building opened in June 1937. The first exhibit held in the showrooms was a program about the planned redevelopment of Sixth Avenue after the planned demolition of the Sixth Avenue Elevated. Twenty-one of the project's laborers were given awards for the quality of their craftsmanship.

The expanded showrooms were initially used for exhibits such as "an ideal city of 2000 AD", displayed in 1937; an exhibit of home appliances, in 1938; and a model of the northern section of Sixth Avenue, in 1941. American Standard sold the structure behind its tower, at 35–39 West 39th Street, in 1950. The expanded tower continued to be occupied by office tenants such as the North Star Woolen Mill Company, as well as the Mosler Safe Company, the latter of which moved to the structure after American Standard acquired it in 1967.

The New York City Landmarks Preservation Commission (LPC) held public hearings in September 1974 to determine whether to designate the American Radiator Building, along with Bryant Park and part of the New York Public Library's interior, as a city landmark. If approved, these would be the city's first modern-era, scenic, and interior landmarks, respectively. American Standard opposed the designation, stating that "the building has no historical significance at all" and claiming that it was only meant to "last a commercial length of time". Only two skyscrapers, the Flatiron Building and the Manhattan Municipal Building, were designated as city landmarks at the time. LPC chairwoman Beverly Moss Spatt said at the time that the "city is in serious trouble", with lawsuits questioning the commission's authority. The three landmark designations were granted in November 1974, and the designations were ratified by the New York City Board of Estimate early the next year. The American Standard Building was added to the National Register of Historic Places on May 7, 1980.

=== Conversion ===
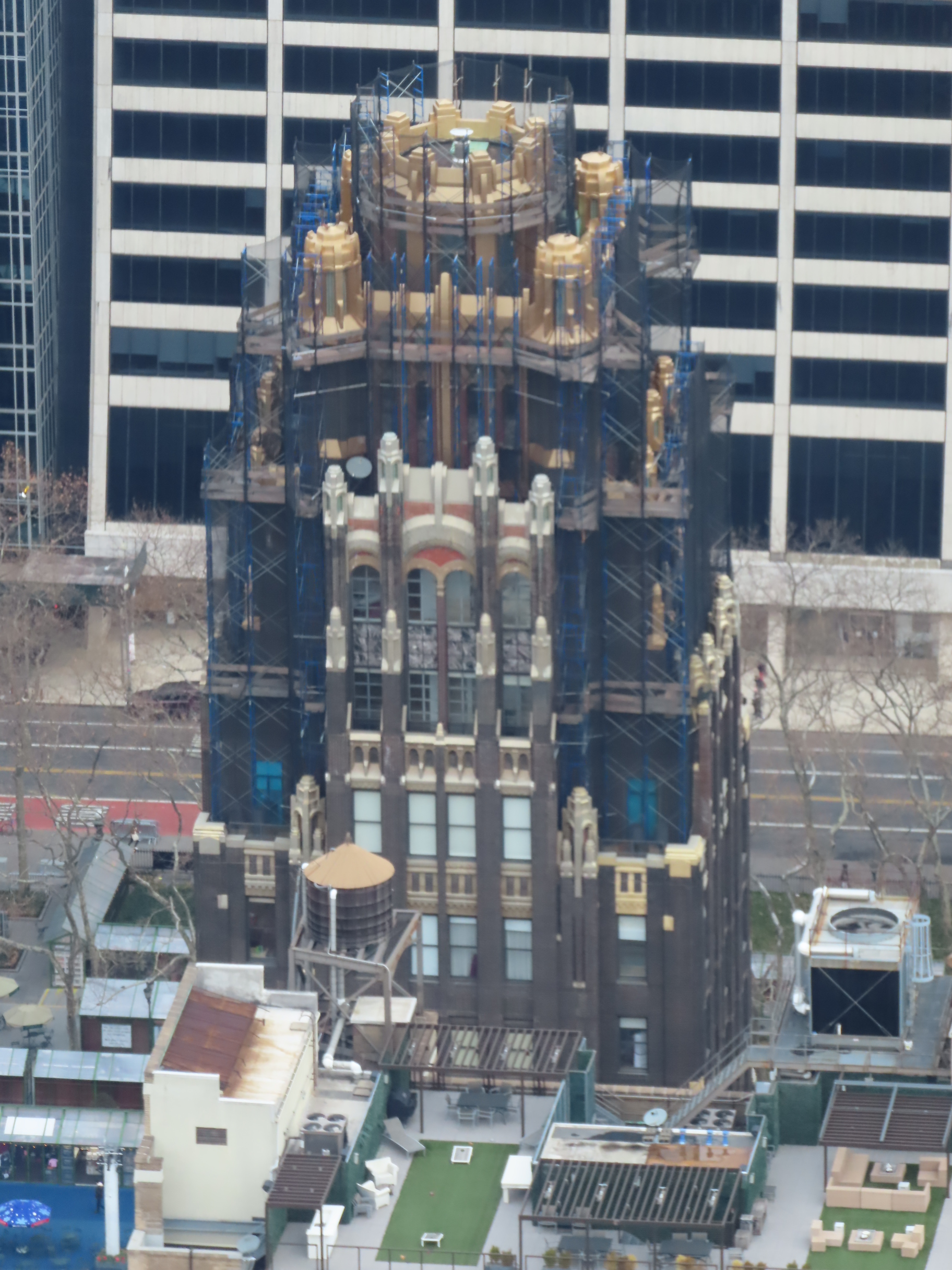
The pinnacle undergoing restoration in 2020

American Standard reduced the number of employees working at its New York City headquarters in the 1980s, decreasing the workforce from 500 to 200 within five years. In early 1988, Black+Decker made a surprise offer to buy American Standard and sell off the American Standard Building. In light of its downsizing, American Standard sold the tower and annex to Japanese company Clio Court (also known as Clio Biz) that September for $43 million. Clio initially proposed converting the building into a luxury hotel with either 160, 200, or 250 rooms. The high price was in part due to high demand for luxury hotels at the time. Clio contemplated erecting at least 15 stories above the annex but did not have a construction estimate at first. American Standard planned to sublease some space in the building in the meantime.

Following a lack of interest from Japanese investors in American real estate, the building stood vacant during the 1990s. When Christopher Gray wrote about the building for The New York Times in 1994, it had already been unoccupied for four years. In the 1990s, the building was also used as an observation area for fashion executives who were watching fashion shows in Bryant Park. By 1997, the shows had moved to Chelsea Piers, partly because Clio was trying to the American Standard Building and partly because of discontent over the Bryant Park location. Fashion designer Tommy Hilfiger reportedly expressed interest in leasing the American Standard Building as his company's headquarters, but no deal was ever made.

==== Main tower ====
The ownership of the main tower and its annex were split when the real estate developer Philip Pilevsky bought the main tower for $15 million in 1998 and began turning it into a 170-room hotel. The hotel was one of several being established outside the traditional hotel districts in New York City. Daiwa Real Estate originally committed to funding the hotel conversion but reneged when Pilevsky experienced financial issues with other projects in late 1998. David Chipperfield was hired as the conversion architect. The city-landmark status required that the renovation architects be particularly careful about the restoration of the facade; the designation prohibited some proposed changes such as bigger guestroom windows. At about forty places, bricks had been taken out so that air-conditioning could be installed. The architects needed to close these holes with hundreds of black bricks, which had been difficult to obtain in the original construction; contractors reused some of the bricks from the interior, which were made of the same material.

The Bryant Park Hotel opened in early 2001 and was frequently fully occupied during its first two months. The Japanese restaurant Koi opened on the ground floor in 2005, and became popular with musicians such as Madonna and Rihanna, as well as those in the fashion and film industries, in part because New York Fashion Week was hosted in Bryant Park. However, by May 2011, the Bryant Park Hotel had fallen behind on its $89 million mortgage. The Moroccan-themed Célon Bar & Lounge opened in the basement in 2017, replacing the hotel's Cellar Bar.

The Bryant Park Hotel closed temporarily in early 2020 due to the COVID-19 pandemic in New York City. By mid-2020, Pilevsky, along with hotel co-owners Raymond Gindi and Joseph Chehebar, had hired Philips International to advertise all 122,000 ft^{2} (11,300 m^{2}) in the main building as office space. The men planned to rent the space in sections ranging from 1,900 to 7,535 ft (579 to 2,297 m). The hotel reopened with limited service in September 2020 and was 20 percent occupied by March 2021.

==== Annex ====
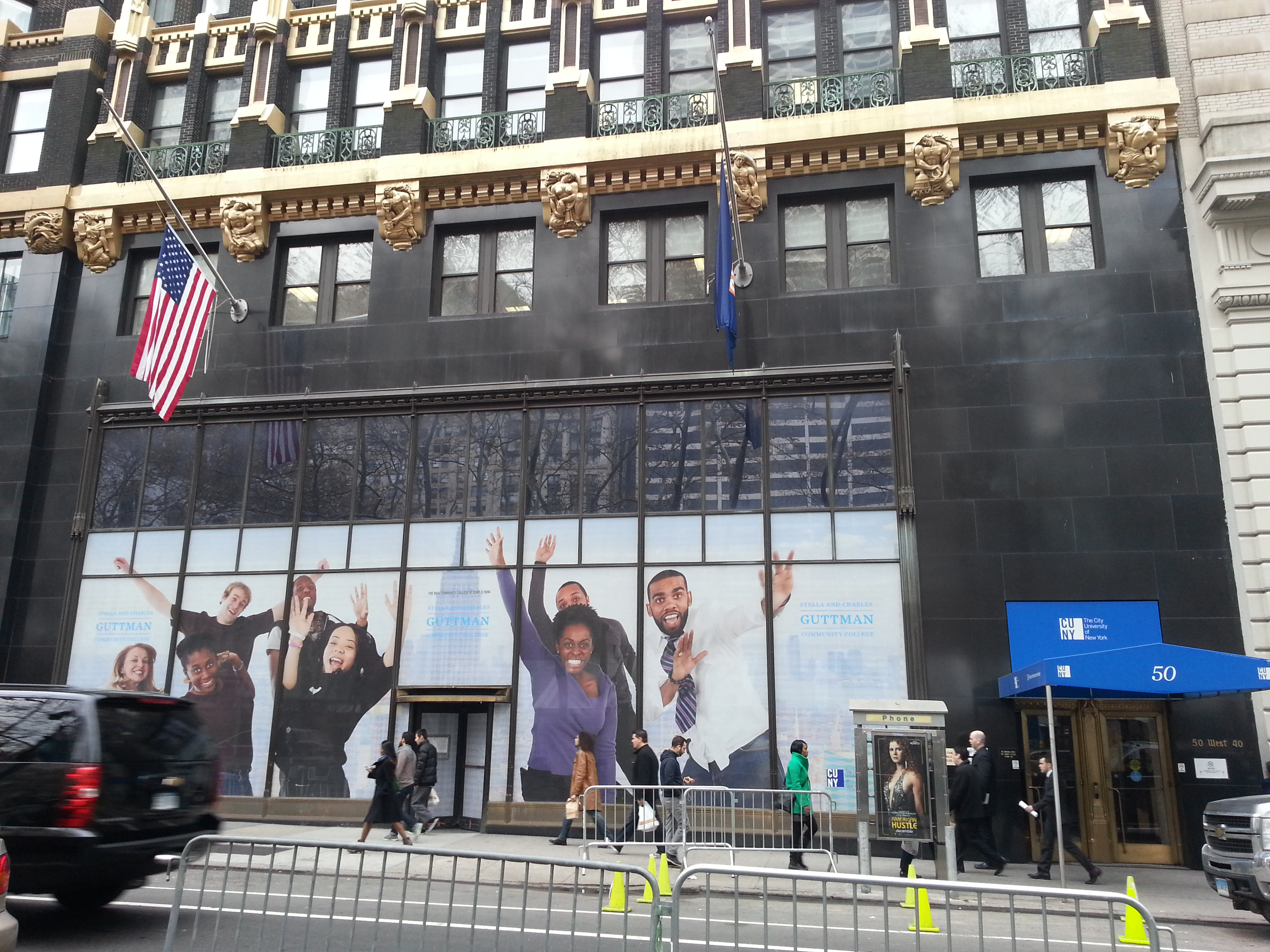
The annex, which contains Guttman Community College

In 2001, the annex was converted to the New York location of Katharine Gibbs School Gibbs School operated until 2009, when it closed all of its locations. Afterward, the City University of New York (CUNY) indicated its intent to sign a lease for the American Radiator annex, which would house a new community college. The school, subsequently renamed Guttman Community College, opened in 2012.

== Impact ==
=== Reception ===
When the building was completed, architect Harvey Wiley Corbett observed that "Comment upon the new building has been sharply divided", quoting one critic who cited the color scheme as a source of argument. Hugh Ferriss wrote that the design "provoked more arguments among laymen on the subject of architectural values than any other structure in the country". Architectural media perceived the building as a novelty. Architecture and Building, for instance, said the design "is unusual, but not therefore unnecessarily ugly", and therefore effective as an advertisement for the American Radiator Company. Architecture magazine's editors stated in 1925 that the building's "very atmosphere", including its color scheme, was "symbolic of its function".

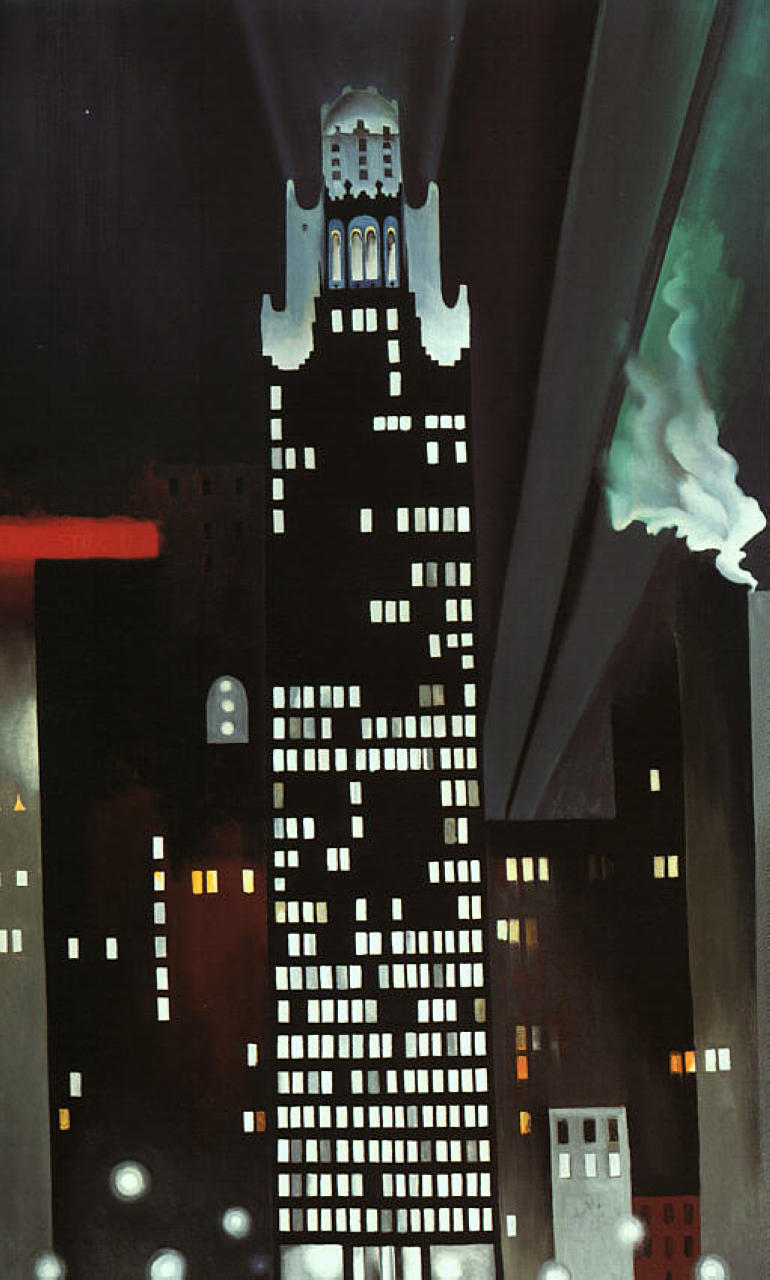
Radiator Building – Night, New York (1927) by Georgia O'Keeffe

Orrick Johns of The New York Times said that the building "has broken through the color line", saying: "It certainly is something new and tremendous but, like jazz and the Ku Klux, hard to place." An anonymous critic in The Villager said that the American Radiator Building "distilled" what they perceived as a monotonous skyline. Architect Talbot Hamlin also praised the building's symbolism as "the perfect artistic expression of the rush and excitement of modern life" and called it the "most daring experiment in color in modern buildings yet made in America". Upon Hood's death in 1934, the New York Daily News called the building "among the finest modern achievements in architecture", along with Hood's McGraw-Hill Building, Daily News Building, and Beaux-Arts Apartments.

Other critics were less appreciative of the novel color scheme. An article published in Architecture magazine during 1925 said that the facade design "shocked and offended some of our good friends from the Middle West who saw it for the first time recently". Journalist Herbert Croly felt that the American Radiator Building was "not particularly successful in itself", though he believed the decorative scheme was useful as an inspiration for future colorful buildings in New York City. Similarly, George Harold Edgell said the design's "effect is theatrical to a degree that opens it to the charge of vulgarity", questioning whether a radiator company required such a prominent edifice.

In its landmark designation, the LPC wrote that "the American Radiator Building with its striking forms and colors not only initiated a new trend in skyscraper design in New York City, but also retains its architectural significance today as a unique expression of design that adds grace and elegance to Manhattan." In 1987, architects Philip Johnson and John Burgee named the American Standard Building as having one of the city's most distinctive roofs. The design was additionally noted for its use of lighting. According to art and architectural historian Dietrich Neumann, the design "helped to introduce a new age of color and light in American architecture." A Wall Street Journal reporter said in 2025 that, although the building was often overlooked amid taller skyscrapers, it symbolized the "origins of what some refer to as 'Corporate America'" because it combined the growing popularities of skyscrapers and white-collar office jobs.

=== Awards and media ===
In December 1924, the Fifth Avenue Association dubbed the American Radiator Building as the second-best new building erected around Fifth Avenue during that year. The Community Trust of New York installed a plaque near the original building's entrance in 1962, commemorating the building's architectural significance. According to Christopher Gray, the American Radiator Building was "so powerful that it inspired other works of art". These artworks included the 1927 painting Radiator Building – Night, New York, by Georgia O'Keeffe, who had first observed the building from her home at the Shelton Hotel. The Crystal Bridges Museum of American Art describes Radiator Building – Night, New York as O'Keeffe's "grandest statement on New York City". In addition, Samuel Gottscho took nighttime photographs of the building.

== See also ==
- Art Deco architecture of New York City
- List of New York City Designated Landmarks in Manhattan from 14th to 59th Streets
- National Register of Historic Places listings in Manhattan from 14th to 59th Streets
