= National Radiator Company =

National Radiator Company may refer to:

- National Radiator Company, (Johnstown, Pennsylvania, USA), later National Radiator Corporation
- A number of European subsidiaries of the American Radiator Company, later under the Ideal Standard business.
  - Compagnie Nationale de Radiateurs in France
  - National Radiator Company Limited in UK
  - Nationale Radiator Gesellschaft mbH in Germany
