= Ernest Eggiman House =

Historic house in Wisconsin, United States

- U.S. National Register of Historic Places
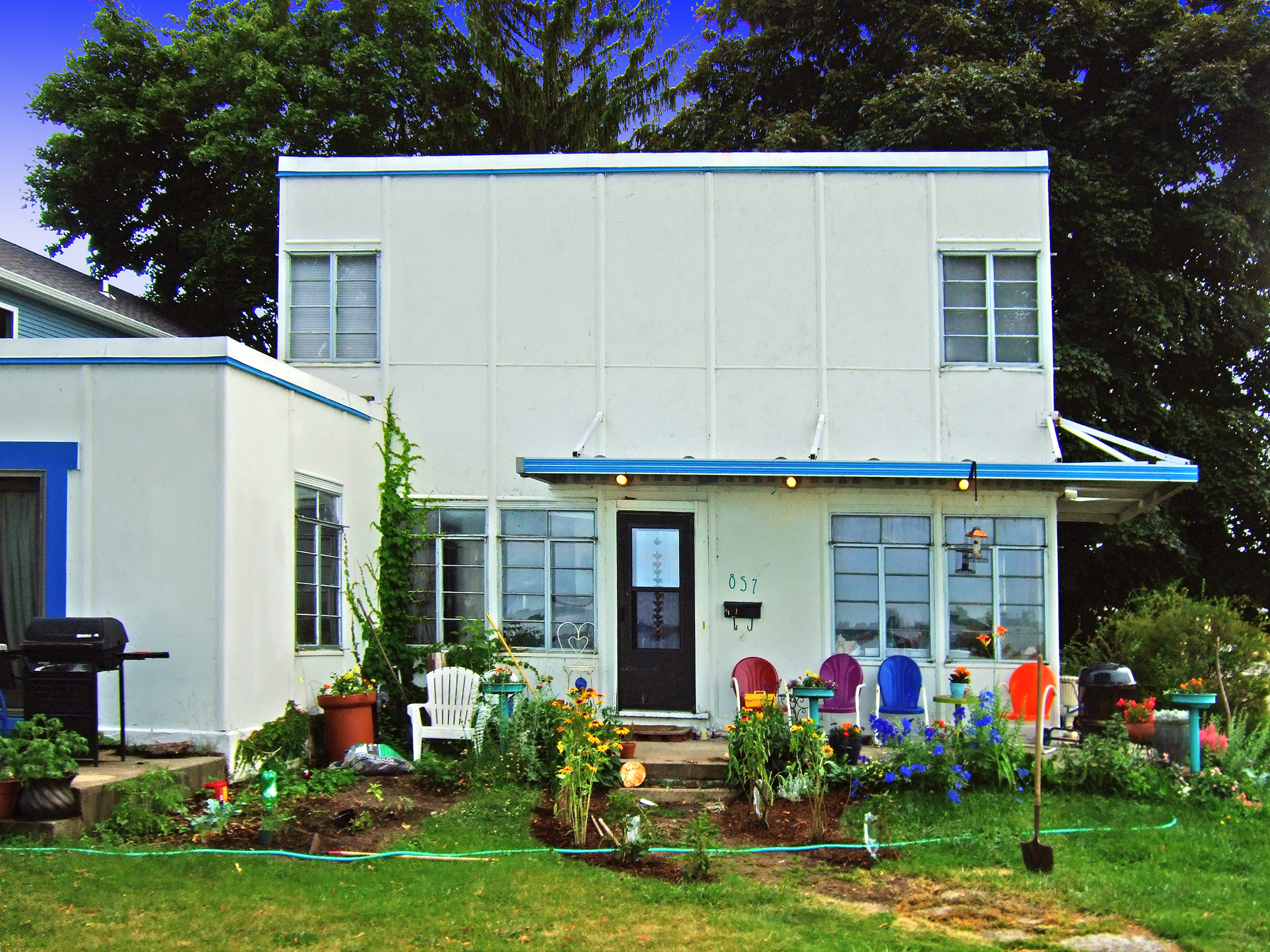
- Ernest Eggiman House
- Location: 857 S. Shore Dr., Madison, Wisconsin
- Coordinates: 43°03′25″N 89°23′52″W
- Area: less than one acre
- Built: 1936
- Architect: Robert McLaughlin, Jr.
- Architectural style: International Style
- NRHP reference No.: 94000599
- Added to NRHP: June 17, 1994

The Ernest Eggiman House is a prefabricated house assembled in 1936 in Madison, Wisconsin. It was a product called the Motohome - an attempt to provide fast, inexpensive housing during the Great Depression. In 1994 it was added to the National Register of Historic Places as the only Motohome in Wisconsin.

== History ==
The U.S. housing industry collapsed during the Great Depression. In Madison 28 new homes were built in 1933, compared to 260 at the peak in earlier years. Nationwide, the FHA estimated a shortfall of 1.75 million houses in 1935. Demand for architects' services dropped at the same time. With these changes in mind, various architects kicked around ideas for how to build a modest house for non-wealthy clients. Wisconsin architect Frank Lloyd Wright tinkered with his Usonian homes. New Jersey architect Robert McLaughlin Jr. aimed for a mass market and mass-production with the Motohome, a kit house that could be assembled from prefabricated parts in as little as two weeks for under $5,000.

McLaughlin's Motohome design had a steel frame covered by 4x8 foot asbestos concrete panels. The vertical joints between panels were covered by aluminum strips. Bands of paired casement windows admitted light. The design was modular, so the panels could be put together in different ways to construct 140 different floor plans costing from $3,500 to $7,200. The exterior fit into the International architectural style which was popular for institutional buildings at that time, with rectangular lines, bands of windows, and lack of adornment.

Inside, the Motohome had utilities and appliances considered leading-edge for the time. Residents controlled their heat, water, and electric with a central "moto-unit," which General Electric and American Radiator had helped design. Each Motohome came with central air-conditioning, bathroom scale, clock radio, dishwasher, iron, percolator, toaster, and washing machine. The manufacturer also provided buyers with a library of how-to books and a week's worth of groceries.

The first prototype was built in 1932 by American Homes, and sold to a coal company in Pennsylvania as possible worker housing. In 1935 the Motohome went into full production.

Built in 1936, the Eggiman house was the 54th Motohome. It was built for Ernest Eggiman, a salesman, by Advance Homes, Inc. of Madison. It was built with a full basement beneath, unlike most Motohomes which were built on a slab. This particular Motohome had a 2-story cube as its main block and a garage in a smaller one-story cube on the southeast corner. The front door was in the middle of the main block, shaded by a flat canopy that still wraps around the corner of the house. Inside, the first floor holds a living room, dining room and kitchen. A central stairway leads to the second story, with three bedrooms and a bathroom. In 1957 the garage was converted to a den and first-story bathroom. At some point the moto-unit (centralized utilities) was replaced, since it could be serviced only by a specially trained repairman.

Only 100 or 150 Motohomes were ever built. They didn't sell and the project was shut down around 1938. Their designer McLaughlin wrote:

It is in a sense unfortunate that the desire for shelter had to be one of man's most primitive instincts. A consequence of this has been the enshrouding of the house with various sentimentalities and prejudices which have kept it from becoming as comfortable, healthful, and happy a place to live in as the methods of our modern civilization might otherwise have accomplished.

That is, Americans in the 1930s were ready for a factory that looked modern, but for a home they preferred something more like the house they had grown up in.

In 1994 the Eggiman house was added to the NRHP as "one of the most important examples [in Wisconsin] of the attempt to industrialize the production of housing during the Great Depression", and an excellent example of the International style of architecture.
