= American Radiator Company Factory Complex =

- U.S. National Register of Historic Places
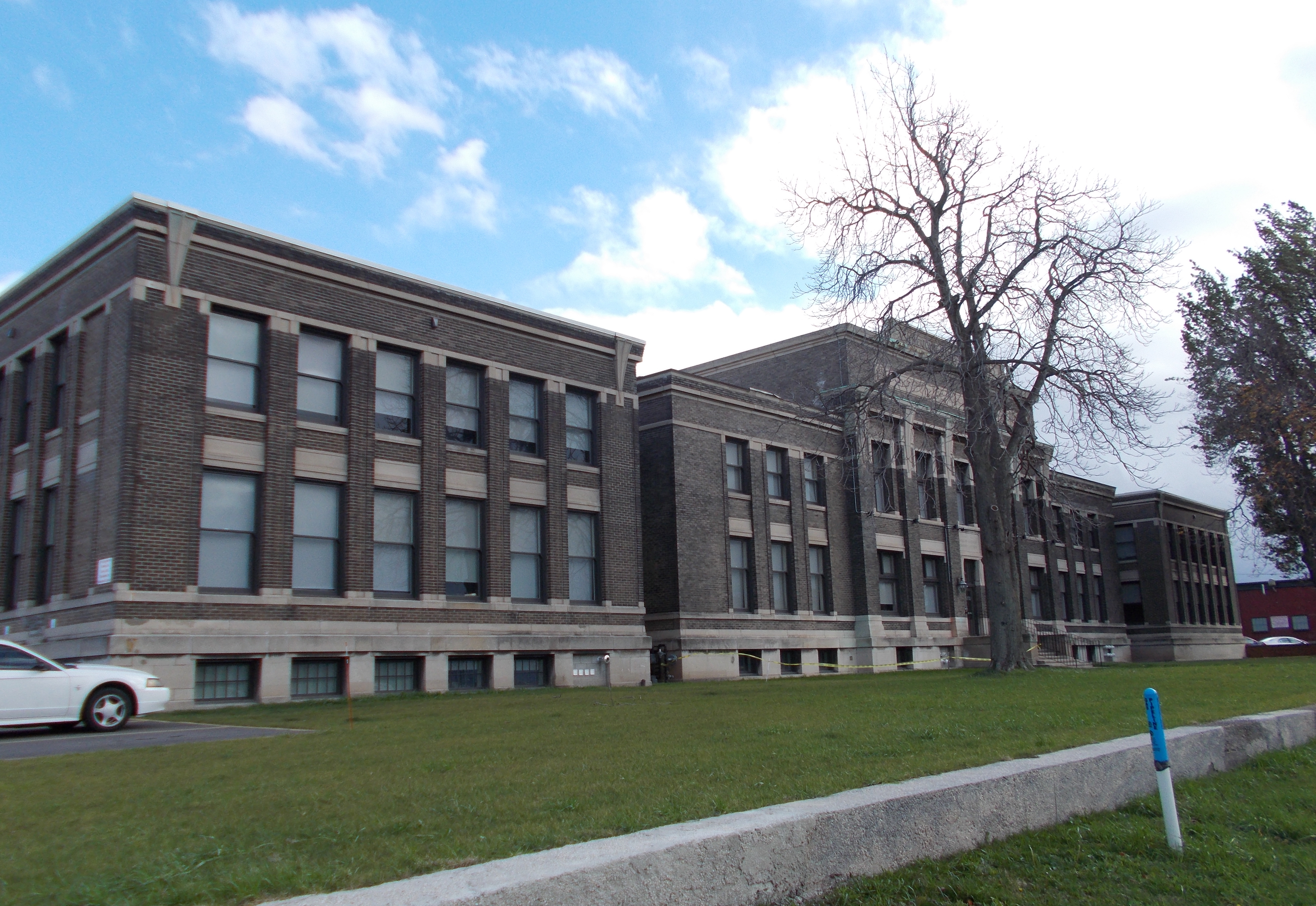
- American Radiator Company Factory Complex, November 2015

- Location within New York Location within the United States
- Location: 1801-1809 Elmwood Ave., Buffalo, New York
- Coordinates: 42°56′44″N 78°52′43″W
- Area: 31.94 acres (12.93 ha)
- Built: 1891, 1906, 1909, 1912, 1914, 1916, 1935, 1951
- Architect: E.B. Green (1906); Schmidt, Garden & Martin (1910); John Youngberg (1915); Bley & Lyman (1924)
- Architectural style: Prairie
- NRHP reference No.: 15000674
- Added to NRHP: September 29, 2015

American Radiator Company Factory Complex, also known as the Pierce Plant, American Radiator & Standard Sanitary Stamping Plant, Institute of Thermal Research, Equipment Plant, and Malleable Foundry, is a historic factory complex located in Buffalo, Erie County, New York. The complex was built between 1891 and 1959, originally by Pierce Steam Heating Company and expanded by its successor the American Radiator Company. It consists of three distinct sections: 1.) the Institute of Thermal Research (designed in 1910 by Schmidt, Garden & Martin and expanded in 1924 by Bley & Lyman), 2.) the Equipment Plant (built in stages between 1891 and 1952), and 3.) the Malleable Foundry (built 1915, expanded several times by 1935). American Radiator amalgamated with Standard Sanitary Manufacturing Company in 1929 to form the American Radiator and Standard Sanitary Corporation, later becoming American Standard in 1967. The Institute of Thermal Research section is an administrative / laboratory building that is a two-story brick building with a stone foundation and an E-shaped plan. The original section includes Prairie School design elements. Additions to the factory buildings were made in 1906 and 1910 by prominent Buffalo architect Edward Brodhead Green.

It was listed on the National Register of Historic Places in 2015.
