= Ideal Standard =

Multinational plumbing fixture company

Ideal Standard International SA
- Industry: Manufacturing
- Founded: 1901 (as Ideal Standard); 2007 (as Ideal Standard International)
- Headquarters: Brussels, Belgium
- Brands: Ideal Standard, Armitage Shanks, Porcher, Vidima, American Standard
- Owner: Villeroy & Boch (2024–present)
- Website: www.idealstandard.com

Older 1987 Ideal Standard logo

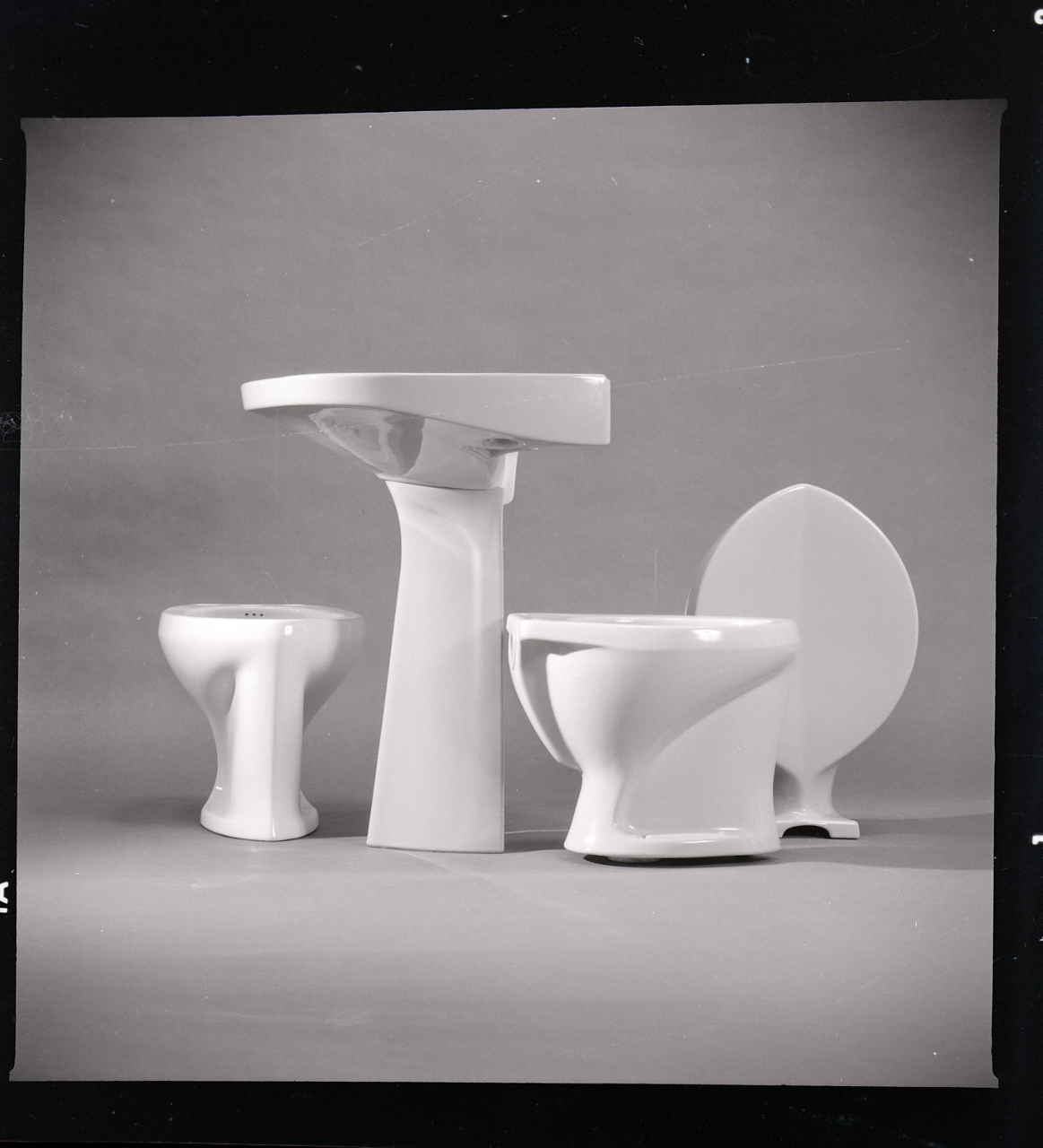
Ceramic sanitary ware designed by Gio Ponti for Ideal Standard, c. 1954. Photo by Paolo Monti.

Ideal Standard is a privately held multinational plumbing fixture company headquartered in Belgium.

Operating primarily in Latin America and Europe, the brand dates back to 1949, when it was used to brand fixtures of the foreign operations of the American Standard group. The "Ideal" name traces back to the "Ideal Boilers" brand used by the American Radiator Company.

== Overview ==
A new company, known as Ideal Standard International, was formed in 2007 by the sale of the bath and kitchen products businesses of American Standard Companies for $1.745 billion to Bain Capital Partners. The North American and Asian operations of American Standard were sold to Sun Capital and Lixil Group respectively, with the European and Latin American operations retained as Ideal Standard.

The company was then restructured, implementing cost-cutting measures, as well as moving some of company's production facilities to Asia and Eastern Europe – a new production site was opened in Bulgaria. The acquisition by Bain Capital was facilitated by Credit Suisse and Bank of America; the creditors subsequently struggled to dispose of their debt.

The restructuring program was complete in 2011, but the company made a loss in 2012 due to poor sales, the following year, they reduced the workforce by 250 and further restructuring was proposed in 2014, including a debt for equity swap with bondholder Anchorage Capital. In 2014 the EU competition commission approved Anchorage Capital becoming joint owner of the company together with Bain Capital.

== Products ==
As of 2014 the company was headquartered in Belgium, and had over 10,000 employees. Its products include bathroom fittings including bathrooms, sanitary ware, and showers, sold under brands including Armitage Shanks, Ceramica Dolomite, Porcher, and Vidima. Since 2018 the creative direction for Ideal Standard has been led by designer and architect Roberto Palomba, along with his studio, Palomba Serafini Associati.

== Acquisition ==
In September 2023, it was announced Ideal Standard had been acquired by the Mettlach-headquartered ceramics manufacturer, Villeroy & Boch for €600 million. The transaction was completed in March 2024.

== See also ==
- American Radiator Company and Standard Sanitary Manufacturing Company, predecessor companies
