= De Mot =

Defunct American motor vehicle manufacturer

Demot Car Company
- Industry: Automobiles
- Founded: 1909
- Defunct: 1910
- Fate: Bankruptcy
- Headquarters: Detroit Michigan
- Products: Runabouts

The De Mot was an American automobile manufactured only in 1910. A product of Detroit, it was a two-seater with a two-cylinder engine. Its name was derived from a shortening of "Detroit Motor".

== History ==
The Demot Car Company was formed in the middle of 1909 in Detroit Michigan with the purpose of making automobiles. The initial plans were to make at least 3000 cars for the 1909 selling year. The president of the firm was C.H. Ritter who was described as a "wealthy retired business man". George Anthony; who would come from the American Radiator Co. would be vice president. Capital stock was $100,000 all paid in. the first factory that the company chose was too small and shortly after forming manufacturing would take place at a 40,000 square foot factory at 1305 Bellevue Avenue; a location that was formerly the site of the Sun Stove Co.

By April 1910 the company was making 45 cars a week.

Demot would make cars without seeking a Selden Patent license. This would result in A.L.A.M. suing the company. Demot would then form an alliance with eight other makers including Paige-Detroit, and Imperial Automobile Co. to fight A.L.A.M.

On August 3 1910 the company would admit that it could not pay its liabilities which where reported to be over $100,000. Two petitioners were named. With General Sales Co. being owed $308, Williams Carburetor Co. being owed $96. At the same time a petition was made to declare the company bankrupt.

By October 1910 a court had permitted Demot to reopen its plants and to have machine work and assembling done by the Ross & young Machine Company. It is unclear if any cars were ever made after this.

One Demot car survives at the Antique Car Museum of Iowa. And it is claimed that three total exist.

== Runabout ==
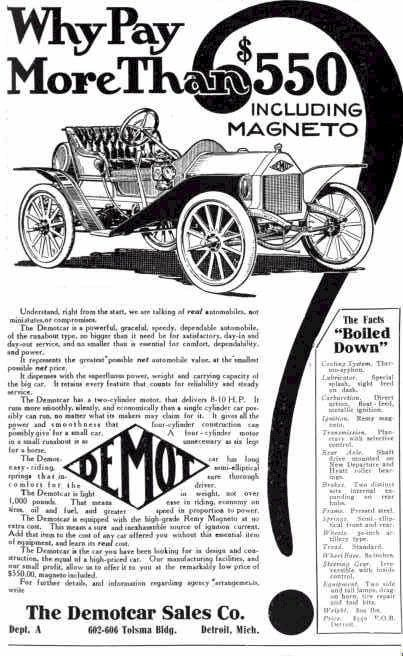
1910 DeMot advertisement

The only car that Demot ever made was a small lightweight low cost runabout. The car would have a two-cylinder opposed engine making 10 horsepower. Cooling was by thermo-siphon. The car had a two speed planetary transmission with two forward gears and a reverse gear. Ignition was by a magneto. The runabout had a wheelbase of 80 inches. The car weighed 800

pounds and the cost was $550.

A Demot runabout would be subjected to a series of reliability tests by the company. Demot would claim that a runabout would be driven over 1500 miles through Michigan. The car would be pushed through mud and sand and rocks. According to the company the car would have a "perfect score"

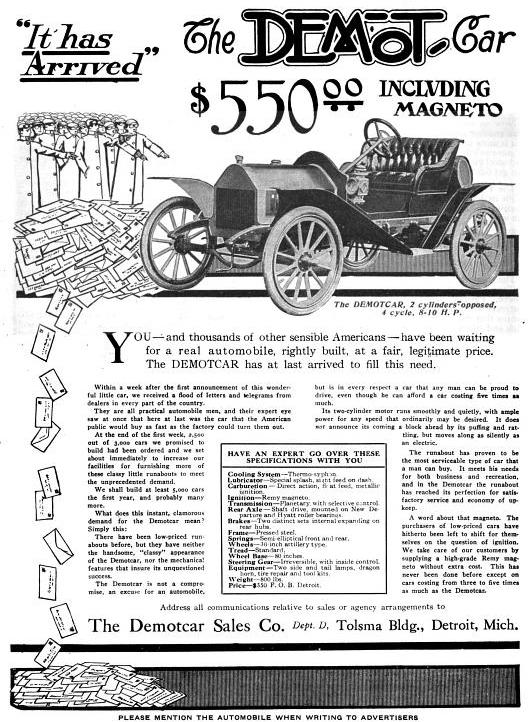
Demot Advertisement

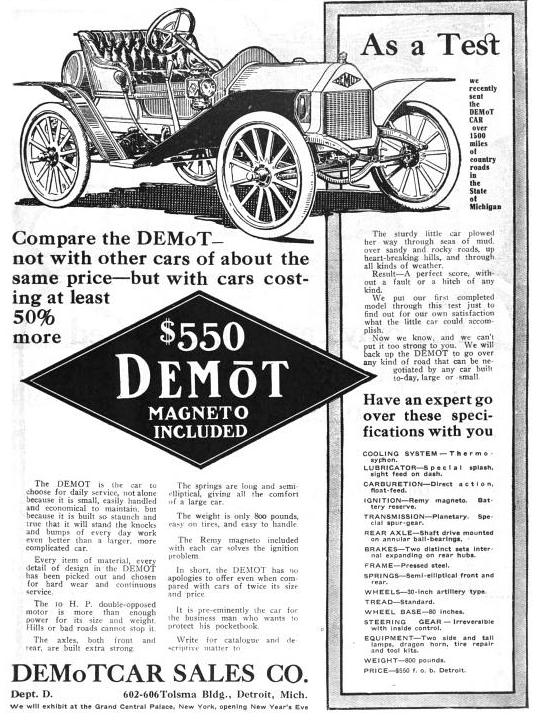
Demot Advertisement
