= WABCO (disambiguation) =

WABCO, or Westinghouse Air Brake Company is a former American manufacturing company.

WABCO may also refer to:

- WABCO Vehicle Control Systems, a part of the former Westinghouse Air Brake Company
- WABCO Holdings, companies also created from the former Westinghouse Air Brake Company
