= WABCO Vehicle Control Systems =

American provider of braking, suspension and transmission systems for commercial vehicles

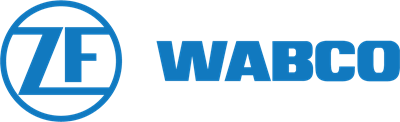
- Company type: Public
- Traded as: NYSE: WBC
- Industry: Component manufacture and supply for commercial vehicles
- Predecessor: Westinghouse Air Brake Company (WABCO); American Standard Companies
- Founded: 1869; 157 years ago, as Westinghouse Air Brake Company
- Founder: George Westinghouse Jr.
- Defunct: May 29, 2020; 6 years ago
- Fate: Acquired by ZF Friedrichshafen and became the Commercial Vehicle Control Systems division of ZF
- Headquarters: Bern, Switzerland
- Area served: Worldwide (39 countries, 28 manufacturing locations)
- Key people: Jacques Esculier (chairman and CEO)
- Products: electronic and active braking systems aerodynamic and stability systems suspension systems transmission automation systems fleet management systems
- Services: customized aftermarket solutions and dedicated support for fleet operators, maintenance workshops and distribution partners
- Revenue: US$2.63 billion (2015)
- Operating income: US$351 million (2015)
- Net income: US$291 million (2015)
- Number of employees: 12000
- Website: wabco-auto.com

WABCO Holdings, Inc. was a U.S.-based provider of electronic braking, stability, suspension and transmission automation systems for heavy-duty commercial vehicles. In 2007, the Vehicle Control Systems was spun off as WABCO Holdings Inc., an American provider of electronic braking, stability, suspension and transmission automation systems for heavy-duty commercial vehicles. Their products are present in many commercial vehicles such as trucks, buses, trailers and off-highway vehicles but they only fill the niche roles. WABCO was acquired by ZF Friedrichshafen in May 2020.

== History ==
WABCO logo

The Westinghouse Air Brake Company was founded in the U.S. in 1869 and acquired by American Standard in 1968. It was designated as American Standards' Vehicle Control Systems division. The earthmoving and mining product range was sold to Dresser Industries in 1984. American Standard changed its name to Trane, Inc. and on July 31, 2007, Trane spun off its Vehicle Control Systems as WABCO Holdings, Inc. via a special dividend to its shareholders. The owners of Trane, Inc. stock received one share of WABCO Holdings for every three shares of Trane, Inc. which they held. Trane, Inc. was acquired by Ingersoll-Rand the following year.

Previously headquartered in Bern, Switzerland (having moved from Brussels, Belgium in February 2019), WABCO employed more than 11000 people in 34 countries worldwide. In 2013, WABCO's total sales were $2,720.5 million, a rise of 10% over the previous year. WABCO was a publicly traded company listed on the New York Stock Exchange as WABCO Holdings, Inc., with the stock symbol WBC.

=== Acquisition by ZF Friedrichshafen ===
On February 27, 2019, WABCO's stock price increased 8% on rumors of a takeover bid by a competitor and trading in the stock was suspended. The following day, a trade publication reported that WABCO had confirmed that it had "been approached" by German auto parts maker ZF Friedrichshafen and was "engaged in preliminary discussions concerning a potential transaction.”

On March 28, 2019, ZF Friedrichshafen announced plans to acquire WABCO for $136.50 per share ($7 billion) in an all-cash transaction. The offer represented a 13% premium above WABCO's February 26 stock price, according to The Wall Street Journal. WABCO shareholders approved the acquisition in July 2019.

In January 2020, the U.S. Department of Justice raised concerns about the market power that the combined entity would have if the acquisition was allowed to proceed. In a news release, a Justice Department spokesman said: “The merger, as originally structured, would have given ZF a monopoly over an essential steering systems component used in trucks and buses that move products and people across the United States.” WABCO was required to divest the steering systems business in order to proceed with the transaction. The companies reached a settlement with the Department of Justice, and ZF completed the $7 billion takeover in May 2020.

On 29 May 2020, WABCO was acquired by ZF Friedrichshafen through a merger agreement and thereafter became the Commercial Vehicle Control Systems division of ZF.

== Notable products ==
WABCO Holdings' key product groups are brake actuators, air compressor/air management, foundation brake, anti-lock braking, conventional braking, electronic braking, air suspension, transmission automation, vehicle electronic architecture and stability control/support.

== Markets ==
Major customers for WABCO Holdings are commercial and consumer vehicle OEMs and commercial after-market parts suppliers. Commercial truck and bus OEMs - such as Daimler (largest customer; 13% of sales, 2010), Cummins, Paccar, and Volvo - account for the majority of sales (62% of sales, 2013). Commercial after-market suppliers represent a significant minority of sales (25% of sales, 2013). Trailer and consumer vehicle OEMs also contribute a small percentage of sales.

WABCO Holdings primary market is in Europe (61% of sales, 2013). They get some business from Asia/Pacific region and much less from other regions of the world.

North America Vehicle Control System and some compressor sales and support are provided by a joint venture (JV) with Meritor Inc. (formerly Rockwell Automotive) while Disc Brake sales and higher margin compressor sales are handled directly by offices in Rochester Hills, MI and Charleston, SC.

North American operations also has a division "WABCO Reman Solutions" formed to offer remanufacturing of various brands of defective automotive components as well as WABCO branded defective components.

== See also ==
- Wabtec - another spin-off from the original Westinghouse Air Brake Company.
