= Armitage Shanks =

British bathroom & plumbing manufacturer

- Type: Private
- Industry: Bathroom fixtures and plumbing supplies
- Predecessor: Armitage Ware Limited
- Founded: 1817; 209 years ago
- Founder: Thomas Bond
- Successor: American Standard Companies
- Headquarters: Armitage, Staffordshire, England, United Kingdom
- Number of locations: 1 factory
- Area served: United Kingdom
- Owner: Villeroy & Boch Group
- Website: www.armitage-shanks.co.uk

Armitage Shanks is a British manufacturer of bathroom fixtures and plumbing supplies, now part of the Villeroy & Boch group.

Armitage Shanks has one factory in the village of Armitage in the United Kingdom. Armitage Shanks is a manufacturer of bathroom fittings for use in private residences, workplaces, hospitals and schools.

== History ==
The company that became Armitage Shanks was founded in 1817, by Thomas Bond in Armitage, Staffordshire. Thomas Bond went bankrupt in 1819 having overextended himself with the provision of workers cottages. Two potteries were functioning and John Tunnicliffe took over one of them. In 1834, the firm of Tunnicliffe and Hall was trading.

In 1846, the owners were Ralph Steele and Mary Sparrow. In 1851, the firm of Fox and Penman was in business and in 1861, Robert H. Penman and Co. The name of Penman, Brown and Co appears. Penman’s works were bought by Josiah Spode III of Hawkesyard Park who had it demolished.

Armitage old pottery still remained, and about 1851 it was taken over by Salt and Swan and was later renamed to Salt, Mountford and Co. Sanitary ware from the factory was displayed at the Exposition Universelle (1855) in Paris. The partnership of George Salt, John Lloyd Mountford, John Sutton, William Booth and Robert Eardley trading as G. Salt, Mountford and Co was dissolved on 3 December 1860.

In 1867, this business was taken over by the Revd. Edward Johns, a Congregational minister and auctioneer from Rugeley. Products were exhibited at the Centennial Exposition in Philadelphia in 1876.

At the turn of the 20th century the business was sold by his son to brothers Edmund Richards and Alfred Henry Corn. It continued to trade as Edward Johns until about 1960 when the business adopted the name of its products, Armitage Ware. The Armitage "sanitary pottery manufacture" became a successful toilet manufacturer in the United Kingdom. In 1907, Armitage Ware Limited was incorporated.

In 1923, during the post First World War boom, the factory was considerably enlarged so that by 1939 the company had achieved a position of significant importance in the industry. This was partly due to the manufacture of coloured ware, which commenced at Armitage during the 1920s for the first time.

Between 1947 and 1953, the factory in Armitage was modernised, with the traditional bottle kilns replaced by three continuous kilns.

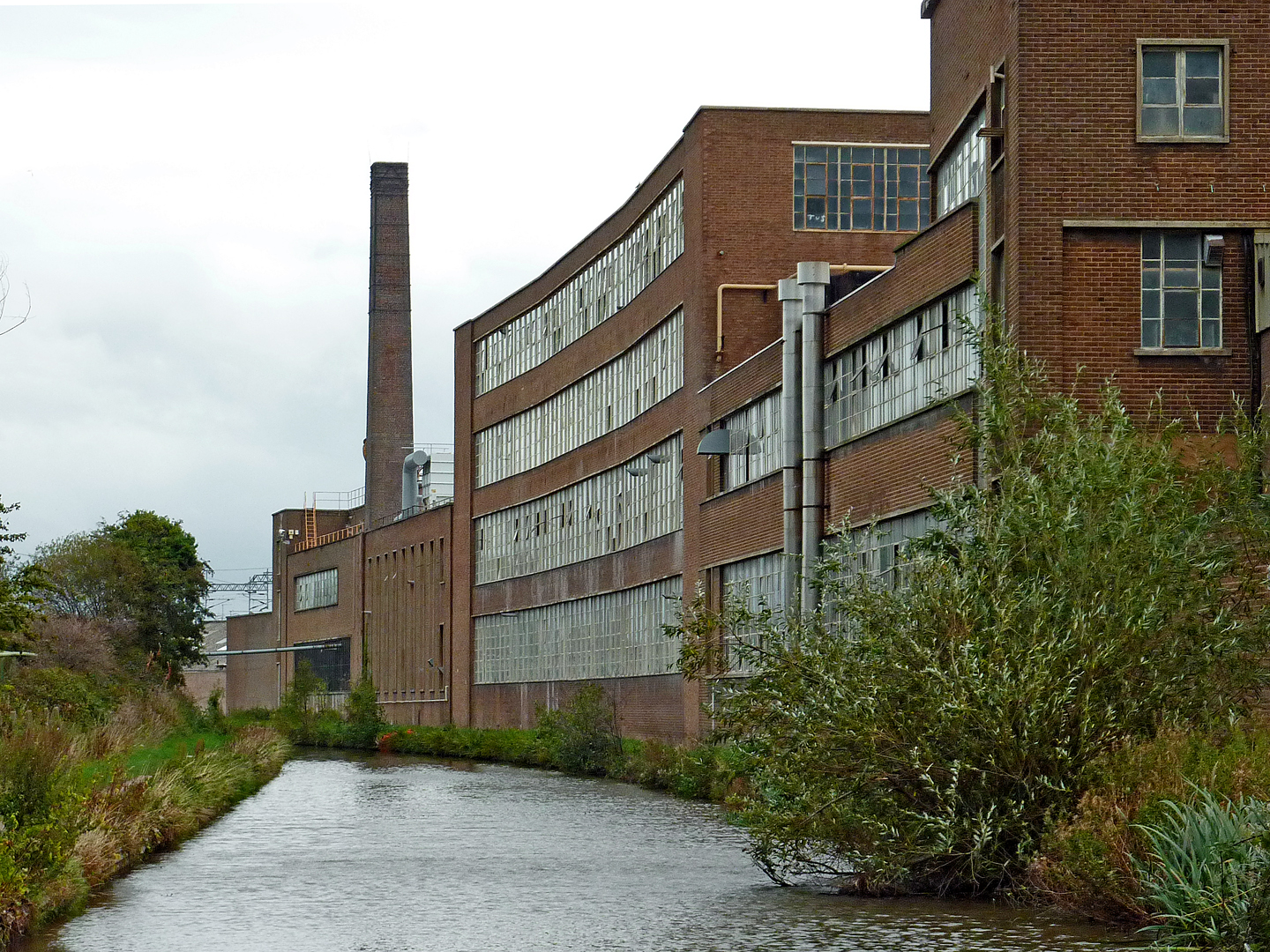
The factory on the Trent and Mersey Canal in Armitage

In 1952 the company acquired a garage and haulage business which became known as Armitage Services (Staffordshire) Ltd. Rugeley Motors Ltd was acquired in 1958.

Business in Australia was traded through sales representatives Dawbarn & Partners. In 1959, a site and modern factory buildings were purchased in Coburg, Melbourne, Australia.

In 1958, the company acquired the brass factory of W. Markes & Co in Cannock, and in 1963 the Johnson Fireclay Company based at the Excelsior Works in Stoke-on-Trent.

In 1969, Armitage merged with Shanks Holdings Limited, a competing "sanitary engineering company" that was established in 1878 in Barrhead, Renfrewshire, producing the famous brand name Armitage Shanks.

In 1980, Armitage Shanks was purchased by Blue Circle Industries. In February 1999, Blue Circle sold its bathroom division, consisting of Armitage Shanks and the Italian Ceramica Dolomite, to U.S. based American Standard Companies for $417 million.

Following this purchase, the Armitage Shanks brand continued in the United Kingdom, and their former export markets. American Standard were acquired by Bain Capital in February 2007. In 2024 it was acquired by the Villeroy & Boch Group

== Gallery ==
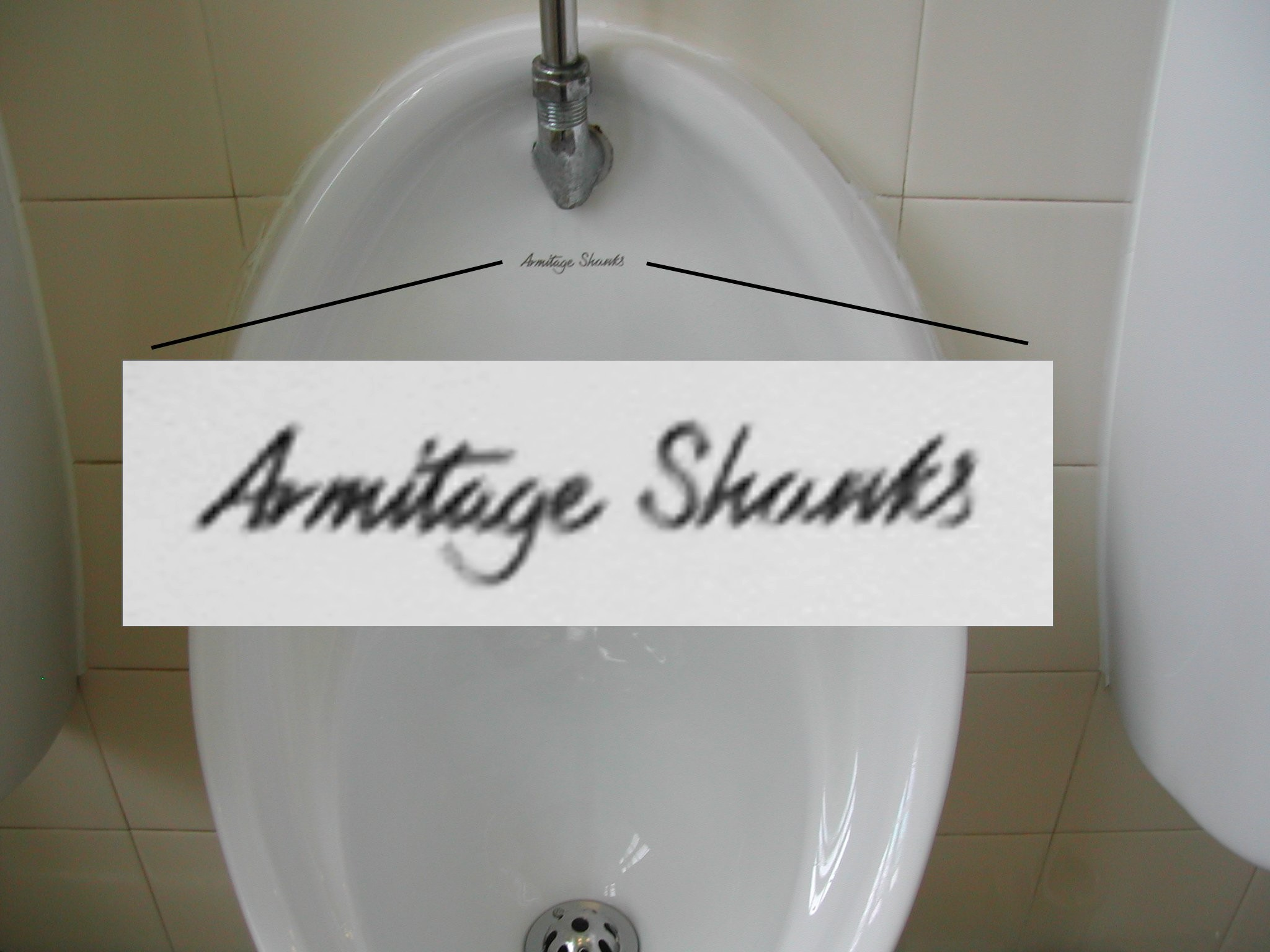
Armitage Shanks logo on a urinal

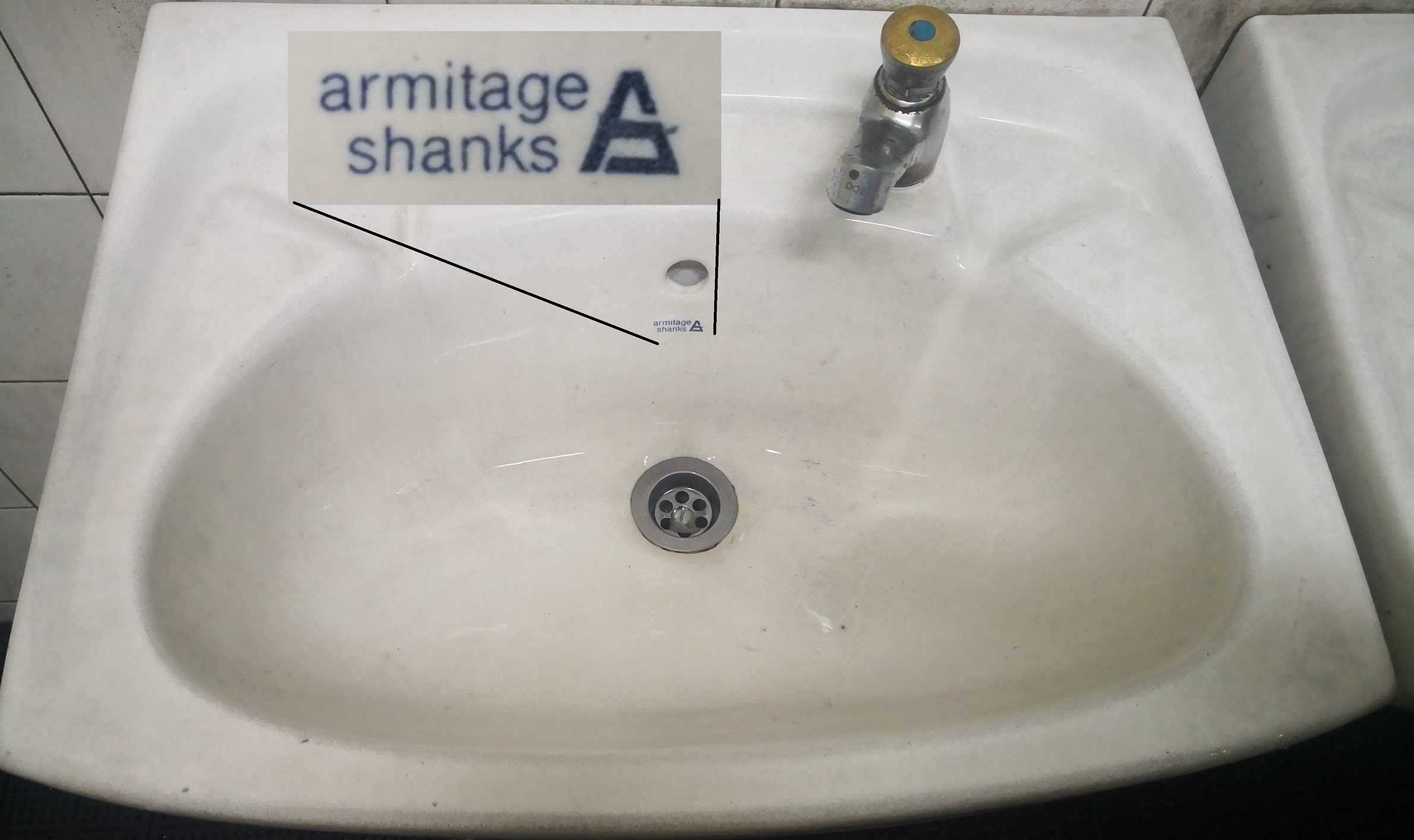
Armitage Shanks logo on a washbasin
