= Groupe Atlantic =

French HVAC company

- Type: Société anonyme
- Industry: Heating, ventilation, and air conditioning
- Founded: 1968; 58 years ago in La Roche-sur-Yon, France
- Headquarters: La Roche-sur-Yon, France
- Area served: Worldwide
- Products: Boilers, heat pumps, air handler, radiators
- Revenue: ▼€2.8 billion (2024)
- Number of employees: ▼11,780 (2024)
- Website: groupe-atlantic.fr

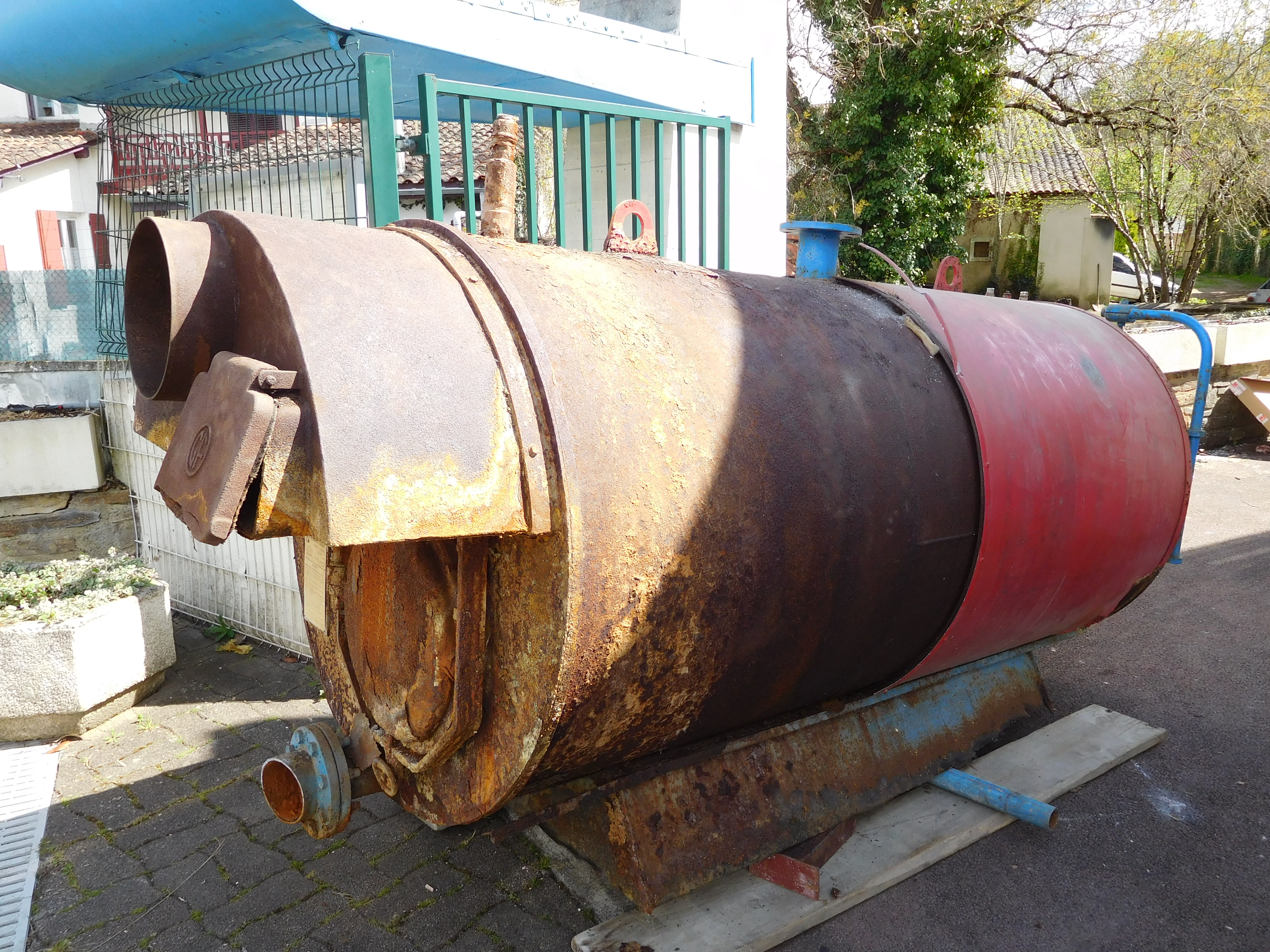
Public pool heater "Chaudière Guillot" (Lyon, Groupe Atlantic), from around 1969, replaced in 2016

The Groupe Atlantic is a French HVAC company. It was founded in la Roche-sur-Yon (in Vendée region on the west coast of France) by Mr Radat and Mr Lamoure in 1968. Groupe Atlantic is based in 10 countries with over 20 factories. The company has 20 factories, 10 of which are located outside France, and approximately 6,500 employees (as of March 2017), of which approximately 2,900 are outside France Groupe Atlantic also own Ideal Heating located in Hull, UK.

== History ==
In 1968, Atlantic was founded by Paul Radat and Pierre Lamoure. During the first years, the company growth was mainly based on mergers and acquisitions of French competitors. In 1973, Guillot a French boiler manufacturer based in Lyon was acquired. In 1986, Thermor & Sauter were acquired by the groupe. These acquisitions were followed by the purchase of Pacific, a French storage water heater company.

In the 2000s, Atlantic start to grow outside of France, with the purchase of Ygnis, a Swiss, which was the first acquisition outside of France. This strategy of internationalisation was continued with the creation of new sites outside of France: The Cairo (Egypt) in 2004, Odesa (Ukraine) in 2006, İzmir (Turkey) in 2007. In the meantime, several sites were created in France like the Fontaine plant in 2008. And company were acquired: Franco-Belge in 2002, Magnum in 2006, Hamworthy (United Kingdom) was taken over in 2008

During the 2010s, the group continued its development strategy in France and abroad. In 2011, Lazzarini (Italy) and Erensan (Turkey) were acquired, followed in 2013 by Feinwerk (Germany) and Austria Email (Austria). The group starts to grow in Asia, with the creation of the Rayong (Thailand) site in 2014.

In 2015 Ideal, Keston and Gledhill (United Kingdom) were acquired, and the Billy-Berclau (France) site was created. In 2016, the Trappes (France) site was created, followed by the acquisition in 2017 of Thercon (Belgium) and Orcon (Netherlands) were acquired. Thanks to the dynamism of the Asian market, the group has accelerated its development there, with the creation of two new sites in 2017: Kutaisi (Georgia) and Dehradun (India). They were followed by the creation of a new plant in İzmir in 2018.

In 2019 ACV (Belgium) was acquired, and in 2021, 70% of ThermicEnergy (Germany) were acquired.

In December 2025, the group announced its agreement to be acquired by the Japanese-American group Paloma Rheem for an amount exceeding 3 billion euros. As of December 23, 2025, the acquisition is still subject to authorization from the Ministry of the Economy and the Dreets of the Pays de la Loire.

== Acquisitions ==
| Brand name | Group member as of | Country of origin | Established |
|---|---|---|---|
| Atlantic | 1968 | France | 1968 |
| Atlantic Guillot | 1973 | France | 1897 |
| Thermor | 1986 | France | 1931 |
| Sauter | 1986 | France | 1915 |
| Ygnis | 2000 | Switzerland | 1943 |
| Hamworthy | 2008 | UK | 1914 |
| Lazzarini | 2011 | Italian | 2004 |
| Erensan | 2011 | Turkey | 1966 |
| Austria Email | 2013 | Austria | 1855 |
| Feinwerk | 2013 | Germany | Unknown |
| Gledhill | 2015 | UK | 1926 |
| Keston | 2015 | Romania | 1994 |
| Ideal Heating | 2015 | UK | 1905 |
| Ideal Commercial | 2015 | UK | 1905 |
| Thermic Energy | 2021 | Germany | unknown |
