= Beverly Moss Spatt =

American historical preservationist (1924–2023)

Beverly Moss Spatt (May 26, 1924 – July 14, 2023) was an American historical preservationist in New York City. From 1974 to 1978, she served as the first female chair of the New York Landmarks Preservation Commission (LPC), and continued as a member through 1982. Under her leadership, 800 sites were designated as historical landmarks. She helped to save Grand Central Terminal from demolition, joining forces with Jacqueline Kennedy Onassis.

Spatt was appointed to the City Planning Commission by Mayor Robert F. Wagner in 1965, but Mayor John V. Lindsay refused to reappoint her in 1970.

== Publication ==
- Spatt, Beverly Moss (1971). "A Proposal to Change the Structure of City Planning: Case Study of New York City”.
