= American Radiator Company =

American manufacturing company

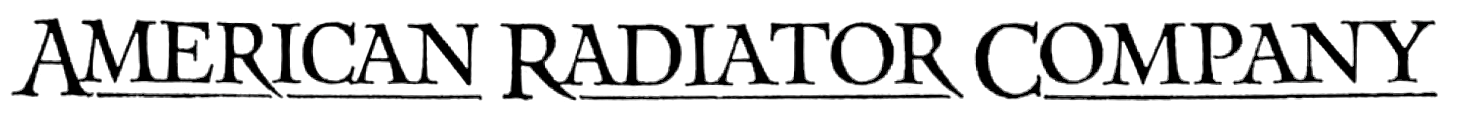
- Logo in 1925
- Predecessor: Michigan Radiator & Iron Manufacturing Company; The Detroit Radiator Company; The Pierce Steam Heating Company
- Founded: 1892; 134 years ago
- Fate: Merged with Standard Sanitary Manufacturing Company
- Successor: American Radiator and Standard Sanitary Corporation

The American Radiator Company was established in 1892 by the merger of a number of North American radiator manufacturers. The company expanded in the early 20th century into Europe under the brand National Radiator Company.

In 1929, it amalgamated with the Standard Sanitary Manufacturing Company to form the American Radiator and Standard Sanitary Corporation, which evolved in 1967 into American Standard Companies, the predecessor to today’s American Standard Brands.

== History ==
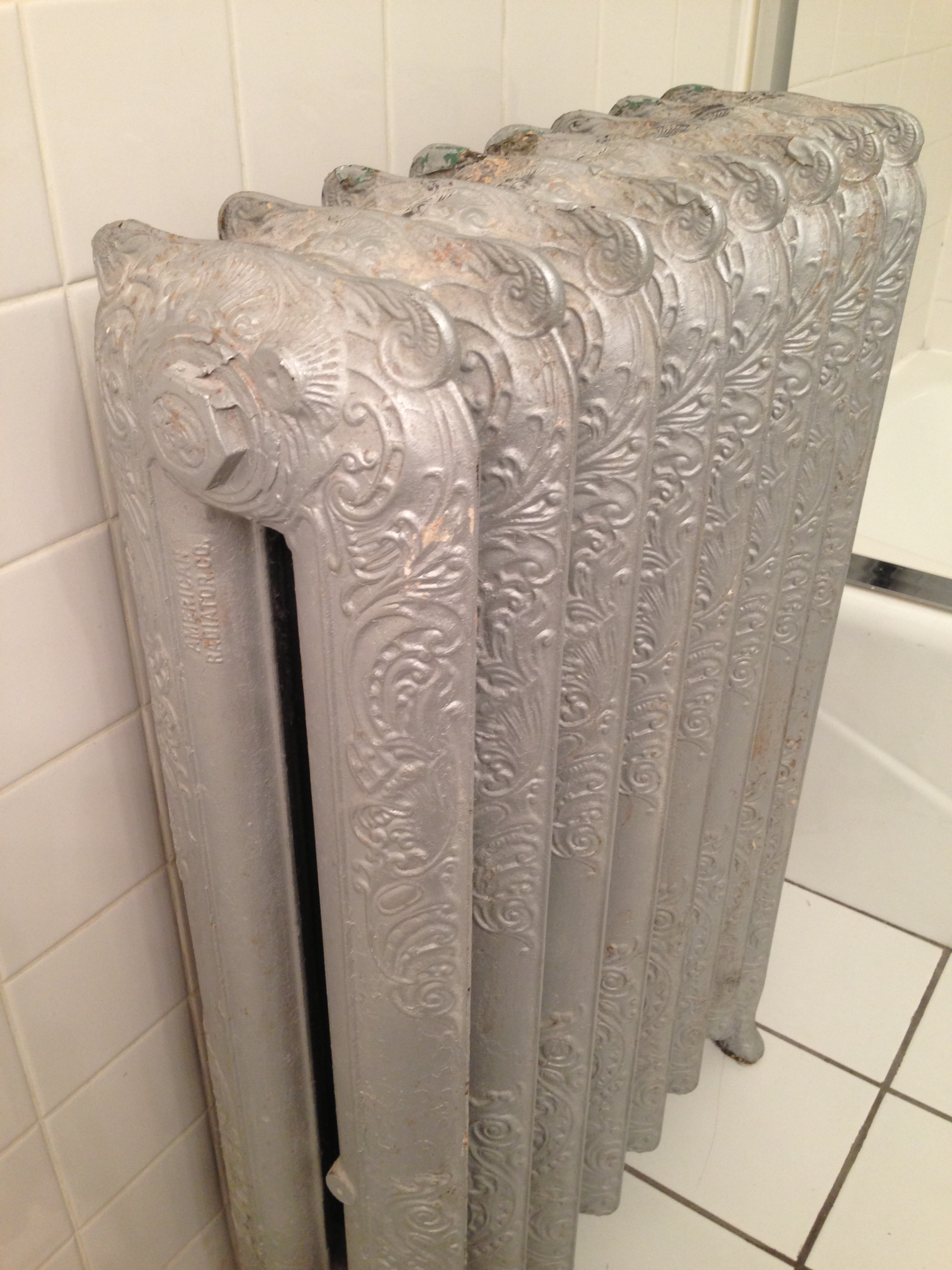
A radiator built by the company (photographed 2013)

=== Predecessors ===
The Michigan Radiator & Iron Manufacturing Company (42.37315°N 83.0548°W) was founded in 1888. John B. Dyar, manager and owner of the Detroit Metal & Heating Works, was the main promoter. Clarence M. Woolley joined the firm in 1887.

The Detroit Radiator Company was founded in 1882 by Henry C. and Charles C. Hodges.

The Pierce Steam Heating Company (42.94522°N 78.87705°W) was founded in 1881 by John B. Pierce and Joseph Bond in Buffalo.

The Standard Radiator Company (Buffalo) was established in 1892 by Nelson Holland.

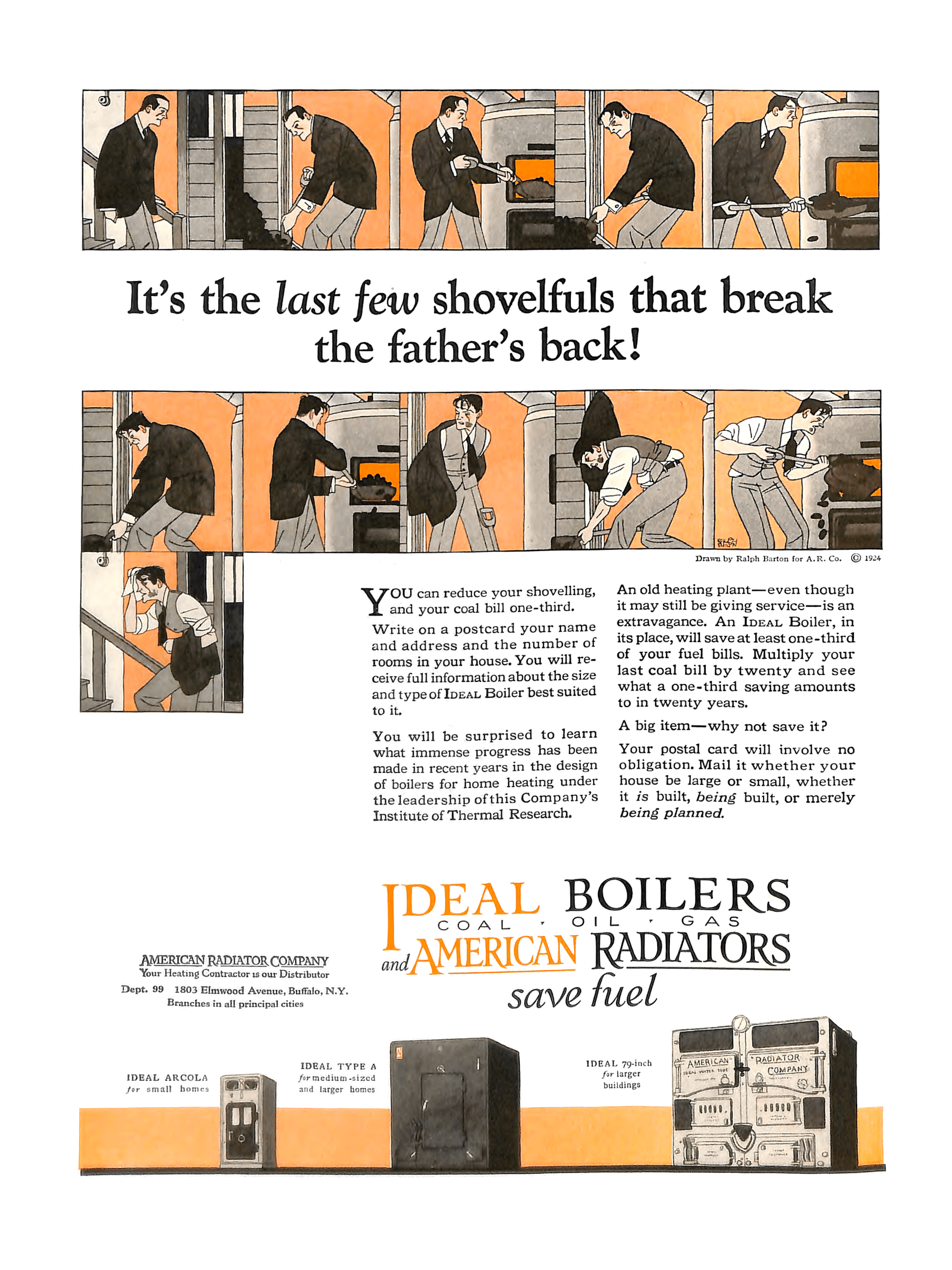
Advertisement for boilers from the American Radiator Company, illustrated by Ralph Barton, published in The Elks Magazine, May 1924

=== Foundation ===
The American Radiator company was formed in 1892 from the Detroit Radiator Company, the Michigan Radiator & Iron Manufacturing Company, and the Pierce Steam Heating Company of Buffalo. The company was headed by Joseph Bond (Note: 1852 Ware - Aug 8, 1902 Chicago) (of Pierce Steam Heating Co.), as president, Charles Hodges, (of Detroit Radiator) as treasurer, and Clarence Woolley (of Michigan Radiator) as secretary.

The company made a profit of $400,000 in its first year, but was subsequently affected by an economic depression (see also Panic of 1893). In 1894, Mr. Woolley convinced the other officers of the company to pay his way to Europe, whereupon he booked the sale of $50,000 worth of cast iron radiators for the Swiss capitol. This was the start of the company's entry into the European market. By the following year, the company had established a branch in London, England. The company began manufacturing in several west European countries, starting in 1898 and continuing into the 1920s.

The company was successful in the United States and European markets, and attracted the attention of J.P. Morgan. Morgan helped the firm to combine most of the radiator manufactories in the US. On February 14, 1899, the company was re-incorporated under the same name in New Jersey, absorbing the St. Louis Radiator Manufacturing Company, (Note: Organized in the early 1890's by W. O. Garrison (Dec 14, 1861 St. Louis - Jan 17, 1904), who was president and general manager until the 1899 merger.) and the Standard Radiator Manufacturing Company of Buffalo, and the radiator business of the Titusville Iron Company. (Note: 41.6262°N 79.6619°W) After the death of Joseph Bond in 1902, Clarence Woolley, at age 39, succeeded him as president and chairman of the board.

Additional plants were acquired in Springfield, (Note: 39.92625°N 83.83294°W) Bayonne, (Note: 40.67876°N 74.10007°W Construction was finished in the Summer of 1915. The plant had a focus to produce for the export trade.) Bremen, (Note: 41.4529°N 86.1453°W) Litchfield, (Note: 39.16943°N 89.64108°W 120 acres of land acquired in Jan 1904. Plant will employ 500.) Kansas City, (Note: 39.09908°N 94.49506°W Work started Dec 1909 on a $500,000 plant to eventually employ 1,000 on a 10 acre plot on the west bank of the Blue River. 39.10021°N 94.60039°W minor office / warehouse / sales room) [...].

The company was listed on the New York Stock Exchange in November 1920.

In 1923 a 600tpd blast furnace plant in North Tonawanda was acquired from the Donner Steel Company.

The American Radiator Building was constructed in New York in 1924. In the 1920s the company added several manufacturing plants in the US, as well as expanding a distribution network.

=== Successor ===
In 1929, the Standard Sanitary Manufacturing Company consolidated with the American Radiator Company to form the American Radiator and Standard Sanitary Corporation, which evolved in 1967 into today's American Standard Companies.

== European subsidiaries ==
In 1894, following the Panic of 1893 and the consequent fall in demand for its products the company began investigating the potential of Europe as a market, and a sales branch was opened in London. In 1897, the company began investigating manufacturing in Europe, specifically France and Germany, countries with high trade tariffs; a branch was opened in Hamburg, which assembled and machine finished cast radiator parts shipped in knock down form. In 1898, the company acquired the established plant of Louis Courtot, in Dôle, France (Dole, Jura) forming the Compagnie Nationale de Radiateurs. In 1901, the company made the decision to establish a manufacturing plant in Germany, a site was selected in Schönebeck. Both establishments proved successful and in 1905 the company began planning for a factory in England, and a site was selected in Hull.

By 1906, the European operations were so successful that on one occasion profits generated exceeded those from the company's American operations. Much of the profit was re-invested in expansion, and the construction of new factories was initiated in Italy (1910, opened 1911) and Austria (1912, opened by 1914).

During World War I the plant became in involved in war work: the Dôle plant was requisitioned by the French state, and manufactured shells; the German, Italian, and Austrian plants were also involved in producing munitions for their respective states; the English plant agreed to supply Belgium with hand-grenades, and also undertook contracts for the British state.

The European operations were incorporated into the American Radiator and Standard Sanitary Corporation in 1929, forming the basis of that company's international operations.

=== Compagnie Nationale de Radiateurs ===
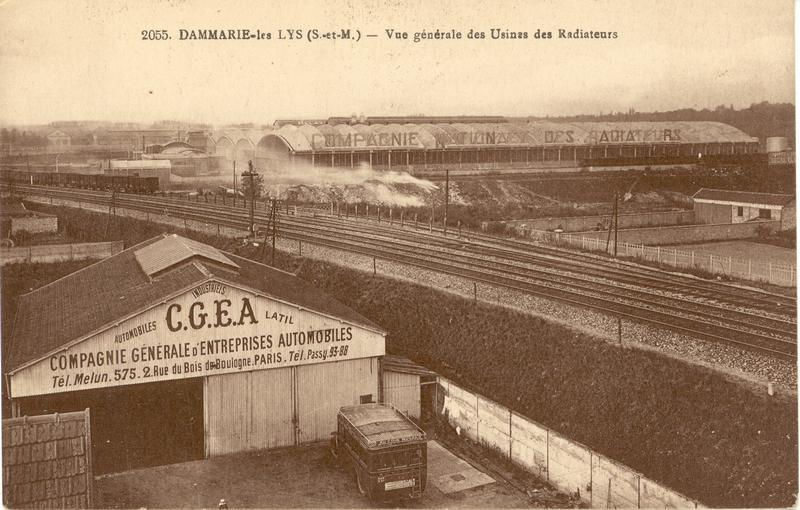
Dammarie-lès-Lys factory (1935)

In the 1880s, engineer Louis Courtot developed a central heating system using radiators and boiler, and established a foundry in Dole (Jura). The factory was acquired by the American Radiator Company in 1898, and a new company established as the Compagnie Nationale de Radiateurs, with a capital of 500,000 francs. Courtot became the managing director of the plant. The company had with low wage costs and fair productivity, resulting in a saving compared to importing products. By 1903, the plant employed 180 people.

In 1905, the company opened a new factory in Dole, and the earlier factory gradually ceased production. The factory became the largest in Dole employing nearly 2000. During the First World War the plant produced 155 and 380mm artillery shells, employing mainly female workers. At the end of the war, the shortage of manpower led to managed immigration of Polish workers, with a housing built for their families.

During the 1920s, new plants were constructed at Clichy-sous-Bois/Aulnay-sous-Bois and Argenteuil. As a consequence, in 1932 the plant in Dole switched to the manufacture of bathroom furniture, including porcelain sanitary ware.

The Aulnay-sur-Bois plant opened in 1923. The two main factory buildings 270 by 70 metres (890 by 230 ft) were built of reinforced concrete by the Limousin company to the designs of Eugène Freyssinet. An extension was built in 1930, also by Limousin. Foundry work (boilers, cast iron baths) was switched to Aulnay.

In 1929, a factory was opened in Dammarie-lès-Lys; the factory structure was also to the design of Freyssinet/Limousin. From 1931, the factory was used entirely for the manufacture of radiators, with a staff of 750.

In 1949, after the parent company had become involved in the production of bathroom fixtures (see American Radiator and Standard Sanitary Corporation, formed 1929) the company was renamed "Idéal Standard".

Manufacture of radiators in Aulnay ceased in 1968. The oil crisis negatively affected the company's activities, and the plant in Aulnay closed. The Dammarie plant closed in 1975. In 1975, production of bathroom furniture ended at Dole. A new company Société Nouvelle Idéal Standard was established under the control of Société Générale de Fonderie (65%) and Société de Dietrich. In 1984 the company came back under the control of American Standard. Bath production using acrylic resin started in 1986.

In 1996, the company Sanifrance was created by the combination of activities of Idéal Standard, Porcher, Piel, and Emafrance as a subsidiary of American Standard. In 2005, Sanifrance became Idéal Standard France, and in 2006, Idéal Standard Industrie France.

=== Nationale Radiator Gesellschaft mbH ===
In 1900, the American Radiator Company decided to add a foundry to their existing operations in Germany, which had been assembling and finishing imported radiator parts in Hamburg from the late 1890s. In 1901, Nationale Radiator Gesellschaft mbH was formed in Berlin as a subsidiary of the American Radiator Company; a factory was established at Schönebeck in 1902. The company was known under the abbreviation NARAG.

An additional factory was established in Neuss and production of radiators concentrated at Neuss, boilers at Schönebeck. With the incorporation of the Standard Sanitary Manufacturing Company into the parent company in 1929, its German subsidiaries were also merged into a division of NARAG, adding cast iron baths, brass water fittings, and porcelain bathroom fittings to the company's output.

During World War I, the factory manufactured shells for the German Empire. During the Second World War the Neuss factory was heavily targeted by bombing campaigns and required rebuilding at the end of the war. The Schönebeck plant became a subsidiary of Volkswagen in 1944 and was used to manufacture V1 rockets; the factory was supplied with slave labour from the Schönebeck camp, a sub-camp of the Buchenwald concentration camp, an estimated 200–400 concentration camp prisoners were used at the plant, other employees during the period included forced labour from eastern Europe, and Italy.

The Schönebeck facility was in soviet occupied East Germany at the end of the Second World War; as a result in 1950 the Neuss site began production of boilers. In 1951, the company was renamed Ideal Standard GmbH. A refrigeration company 'Gesellschaft die Rheinkälte' (Düsseldorf) was acquired in 1955. In the 1960s, during the German economic boom the company expanded, with a sites in Wittlich (radiators), and in Waldbröl und Berlin (boilers, radiators; acquired from the Projahn-Werkes).

At the end of the 1960s, the Wittlich site was concentrated on the production of fittings serving the whole European market; valve production was reduced at Neuss in favour of the Clichy factory in France, and the site in Neuss became focused on ceramic manufacture. In the mid-1970s, the company withdrew from the heating business, and the sites in Waldbröl and Berlin shut.

=== National Radiator Company Limited ===
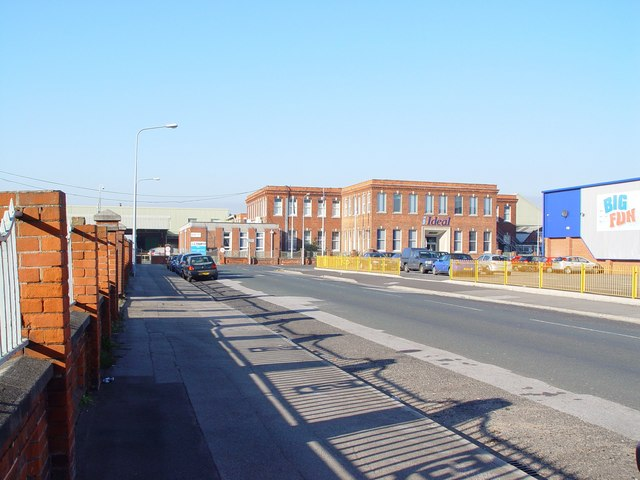
Ideal Boilers offices, Hull (2007)

In 1905 the company's operations in France and Germany were proving successful, and the firm decided to open a factory in England. The company "National Radiator Company, Ltd." was established, and $500,000 was provided for the establishment of a factory. A site in Kingston-upon-Hull was selected for the factory.

Construction of the factory began in 1906, and the first casting was produced in December. The plant was expanded in 1910. During World War I, much of the production was shifted to the munition production. In 1917 the factory was further expanded, in anticipation of a post-war building boom.

In 1934 the company was publicly listed as "Ideal Boilers and Radiators" (capital £750,000) in order to raise cash for a factory extension. By 1938 a new plant producing vitreous sanitary ware had begun operation.

During World War II the plant produced munitions including mortar bombs and grenades, as well as boilers and vitreous china for military use.

In 1953 the company was renamed "Ideal Standard".

In 1976 the boiler and radiator operations of the plant were acquired by Stelrad Group (Metal Box), whilst the vitreous china (bathroom furniture) operations remained under the control of Ideal Standard. Radiator production was ended at Stelrad's Hull site, and production was focused on boilers. In 1989 the Metal Box company demergered, and MB group formed; Caradon was acquired by MB group becoming MB Caradon in 1989 and the Hull boiler factory became Caradon Ideal in 1993.

In the 2010s the Ideal Boilers' foundry was closed with the loss of 57 jobs and outsource casting to third parties.

As of 2014 the boiler plant operated as "Ideal Boilers" as part of the Ideal Stelrad group, and the bathroom fittings plant is part of Ideal Standard.

In 2015 Ideal Boilers was acquired from holding company ISG Holdings 1 by French HVAC business Groupe Atlantic.

== Recognition ==
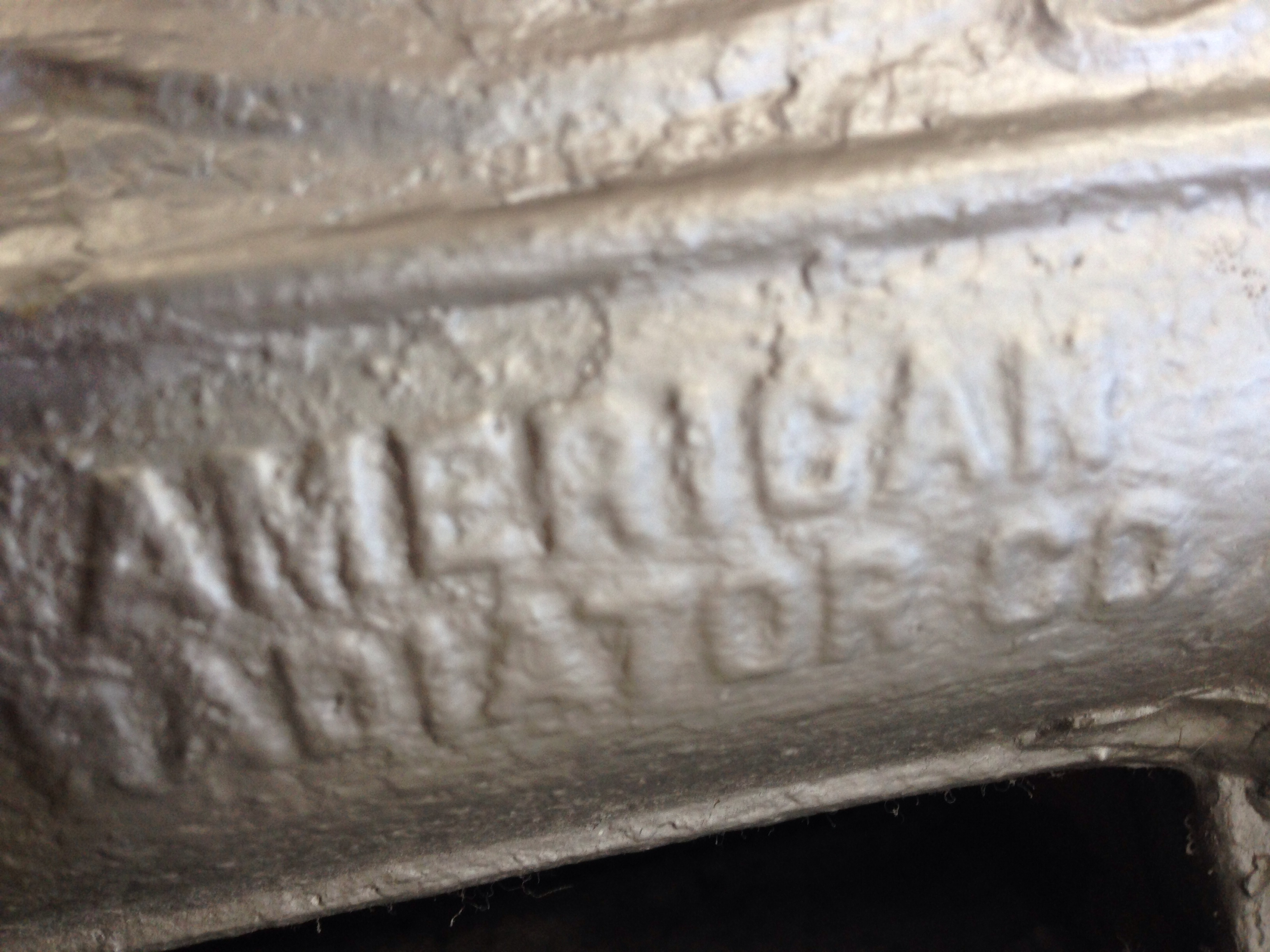
A logo on a radiator from American Radiator Co.

In consequence of the radiator's contribution to the lives and social history of North Americans, in 2012 the American Radiator Company was inducted into the North American Railway Hall of Fame.

== See also ==
- American Radiator Building and Ideal House, London; headquarters in New York and London
- American Radiator Company Factory Complex, formerly the Pierce Steam Heating Company, Buffalo, NY, listed on the National Register of Historic Places in 2015.
