= Standard Sanitary Manufacturing Company =

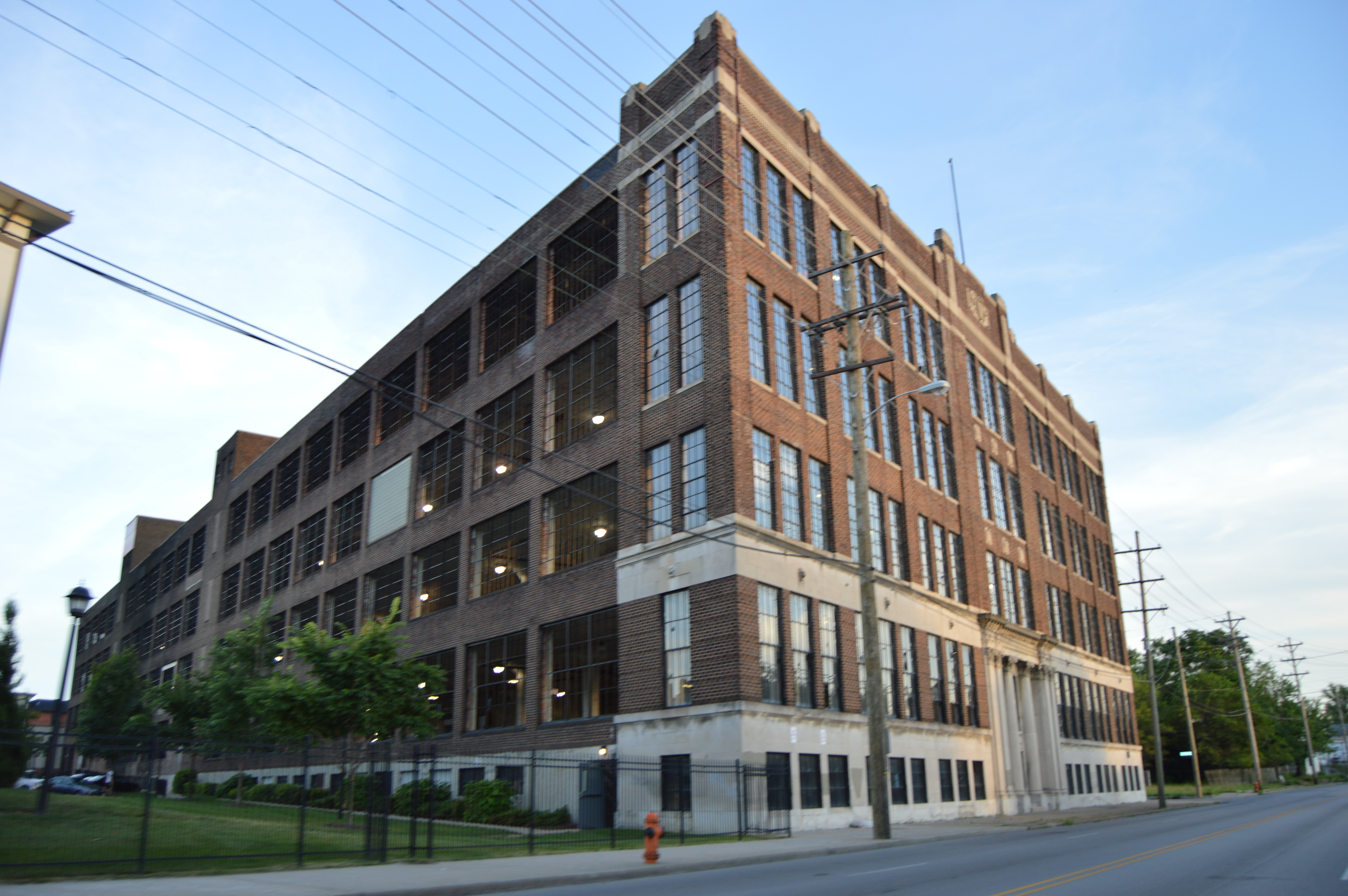
The firm's brass finishing building in Louisville, Kentucky

The Standard Sanitary Manufacturing Company was an American manufacturer of bathroom fixtures. It was formed in 1875 by the merger of the Ahrens and Ott Manufacturing Company, the Standard Manufacturing Company, the Dawes and Myler Manufacturing Company, and six other plants which were consolidated to form the Standard Manufacturing Company, headquartered in Pittsburgh, with Theodore Ahrens (Jr.) as its first president. He held this position, and others, until 1934.

The original Standard Sanitary was formed when James West Arrott of James West Arrott Insurance company in Pittsburgh, Pennsylvania took over a bankrupt hopper company that could not pay their insurance premiums. Along with Francis Torrance (they were related as they married the Waddell sisters) they learned about the enamelization of porcelain in Europe and brought that technique to America by first making bathtubs and then toilets and sinks. It was in the late 1890s that Standard Sanitary was combined with other plumbing manufacturers to form the Standard Sanitary Manufacturing Company.

In 1929, the company merged with the American Radiator Company to form the American Radiator and Standard Sanitary Corporation.
