= American Standard Companies =

American manufacturing company

American Standard Companies Inc.
- Type: Public
- Traded as: NYSE: ASD
- Industry: Manufacturing
- Founded: 1929; 97 years ago
- Defunct: 2007; 19 years ago
- Fate: Split into American Standard Brands, Trane and WABCO Vehicle Control Systems
- Headquarters: Piscataway, New Jersey, U.S.
- Key people: Frederic M. Poses (chairman and CEO)
- Products: Heating, ventilation, and air conditioning systems; Plumbing fixtures; Automotive parts
- Number of employees: 15,200

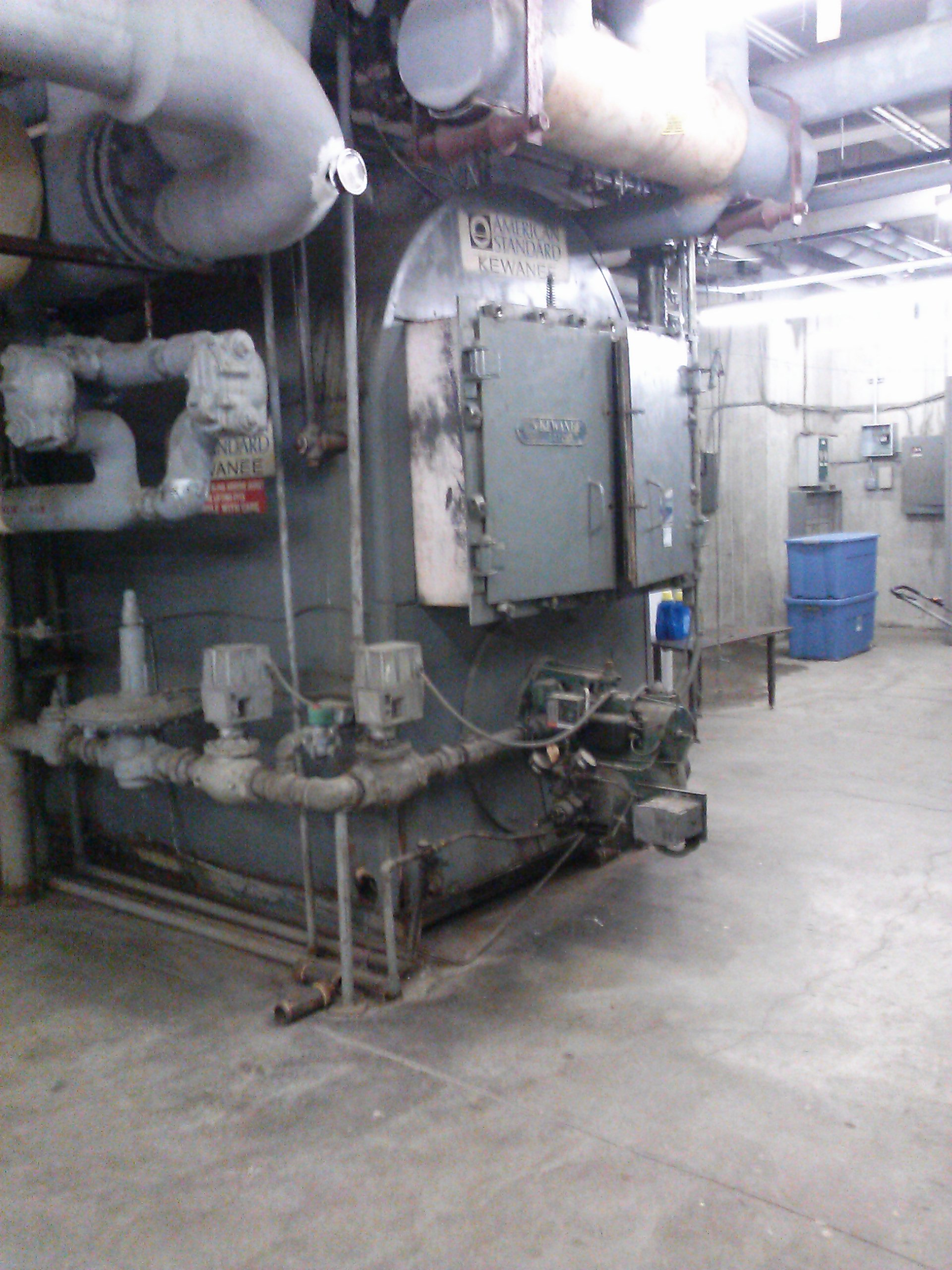
Kewanee boiler

American Standard Companies Inc. was a manufacturer of heating, ventilation, and air conditioning (HVAC) systems, plumbing fixtures, and automotive parts. The company was formed in 1929 through the merger of the American Radiator Company and Standard Sanitary Manufacturing Company forming the American Radiator and Standard Sanitary Corporation. The name was simplified to American Standard (which had been in common use for some time) in 1967.

The company was broken up in 2007 with the spin off of its automotive parts division as WABCO Vehicle Control Systems and sale of the plumbing fixtures division as American Standard Brands. The remainder of the company subsumed the name of its HVAC division, Trane, and was acquired by Ingersoll Rand in 2008, with the parent company since renaming itself Trane Technologies.

== History ==
In 1929, the American Radiator Company (founded 1892) merged with the Standard Sanitary Manufacturing Company (founded 1875) to form the American Radiator and Standard Sanitary Corporation. The plumbing division, Standard Sanitary, would continue to sell their products under the "Standard" label until 1967, when the company changed its name to American Standard Corporation. The American Standard label was used for both divisions from that year on.

In 1929, American Standard bought the Kewanee Boiler Company, which it kept until the early 1970s.

In 1968, the group purchased earthmoving and mining product range of the Westinghouse Air Brake Company (WABCO). It divested itself of these assets in 1984.

In 1984, the group acquired HVAC manufacturer Trane. In 1999, American Standard purchased control of the United Kingdom-based plumbing fixture companies Armitage Shanks and Ceramica Dolomite of Italy from Blue Circle Industries for $430 million.

On February 1, 2007 the company announced it would break up its three divisions:

- The automotive parts division was spun off, forming WABCO Vehicle Control Systems.
- The plumbing fixtures division was sold off to Bain Capital for $1.745 billion. Bain sold the North American and Asian operations to Sun Capital and Lixil Group respectively, while retaining the European and Latin American operations as Ideal Standard. The deal also included the rights to use the former company name in North America operating as American Standard Brands.
- The remainder of the company took the name of its heating and air conditioning division, Trane. Ingersoll Rand made an offer to acquire Trane on December 17, 2007 and the sale was completed on June 5, 2008. The parent company has since been renamed Trane Technologies.

== See also ==
- American Standard Brands
