= Rene Paul Chambellan =

American sculptor (1893–1955)

- Chambellan at work
- Born: Rene Paul Chambellan; September 15, 1893; West Hoboken, New Jersey
- Died: November 29, 1955 (aged 62); Jersey City, New Jersey
- Known for: Sculpture

Rene Paul Chambellan (September 15, 1893 – November 29, 1955) was an American sculptor who specialized in architectural sculpture. He was also one of the foremost practitioners of what was then called the "French Modern Style" and has subsequently been labeled Zig-Zag Moderne, or Art Deco. He also frequently designed in the Greco Deco style.

== Life and career ==
Chambellan was born in West Hoboken, New Jersey (now part of Union City, New Jersey). He studied at New York University from 1912 to 1914, in Paris at the Beaux-Arts Institute of Design from 1914 to 1917 and the Académie Julian (1918-1919), as well as with sculptor Solon Borglum in New York City. During the First World War, he was a sergeant in France with the U.S. Army.

A resident of Cliffside Park, New Jersey, Chambellan died in a nursing home in Jersey City, New Jersey.

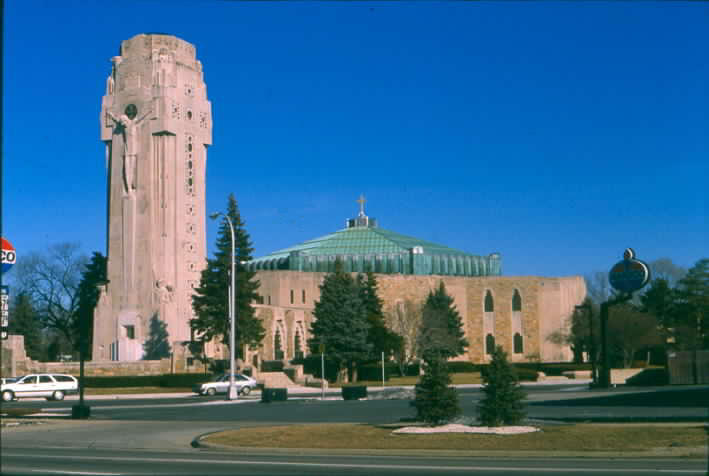
National Shrine of the Little Flower, Royal Oak, Michigan

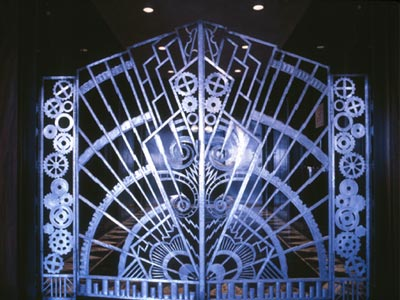
Gates from the Chanin Building which led to the private offices of Chanin

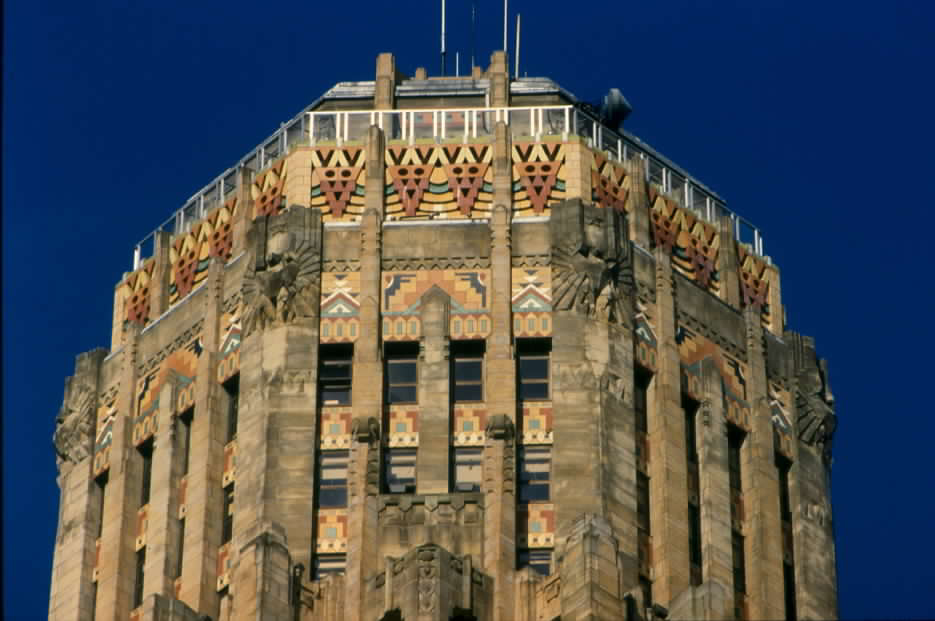
Eagles on top of the Buffalo City Hall

== Selected architectural sculpture ==
- 1922-1926 – Russell Sage Foundation Building, Grosvenor Atterbury architect, (now Sage House), 122-130 East 22nd Street, New York City
- 1923-1924 – American Radiator Building, Howels & Hood and André Fouilhoux architects, NYC
- 1925 – Chicago Tribune Building, Raymond Hood architect, Chicago, Illinois
- 1927 – Sterling Memorial Library, James Gamble Rogers architect, Yale University, New Haven, Connecticut

– Home Savings Bank of Albany, Dennison & Hirons architects, Albany, New York

- 1927-1929 – Williamsburgh Savings Bank Tower, Robert Helmer of Halsey, McCormack and Helmer, architects, Brooklyn
- 1928 – New York Life Building, Cass Gilbert architect, NYC

– State Bank & Trust Company Building, Dennison & Hirons, architects, NYC
– Beekman Tower, John Mead Howells, architect, NYC

- 1929 – Chanin Building, Sloan & Robertson architects, NYC

– Stewart & Company Building, Warren & Wetmore architects, NYC

- 1930 – Daily News Building, Raymond Hood architect, NYC
- 1931 – Buffalo City Hall, Deitel, & Wade architects, Buffalo, New York

– Carew Tower, Delano & Aldrich with W.H. Ahlschlager architects, Cincinnati, Ohio
– King’s County Hospital, LeRoy P. Ward architect, NYC
– Tower, National Shrine of the Little Flower, Henry McGill architect, Royal Oak, Michigan
– Sterling Memorial Library, James Gamble Rogers architect, New Haven, Connecticut

- c.1932 – New York State Office Building, Albany, New York
- 1939 – Manhattan Criminal Courthouse (100 Centre Street), Harvey Wiley Corbett and Charles B. Meyers architects, NYC 1939
- 1940 – Airlines Building, John B. Peterkin architect, NYC
- 1948 – Firestone Memorial Library, O’Connor & Kilham architects, Princeton University, Princeton, New Jersey
- Queens County Hospital, NYC
- Naval Hospital, Beaufort, South Carolina

== Other works ==
- 1921 – John Newbery Medal
- c.1928 Series of five designs in cast-iron depicting historic New York City seals, for the Miller Elevated Highway
- 1929 – Bronze Doors, East New York Savings Bank, Holmes & Winslow architects, Brooklyn, New York
- c.1930s Tritons, Nereids and Dolphins, Rockefeller Center, NYC
- 1937 – Bronze Doors, Hirons & Woolwine architects, Davidson County Courthouse, Nashville, Tennessee

– Caldecott Medal

- 1940 – John Bates Clark Medal for American Economic Association
- c.1950 World War II Monument, Midland, Michigan

== Gallery ==
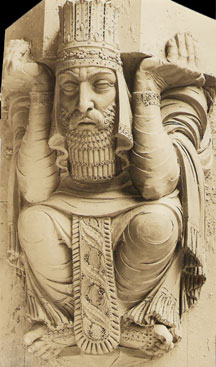
One of Chambellan's designs (building boss)

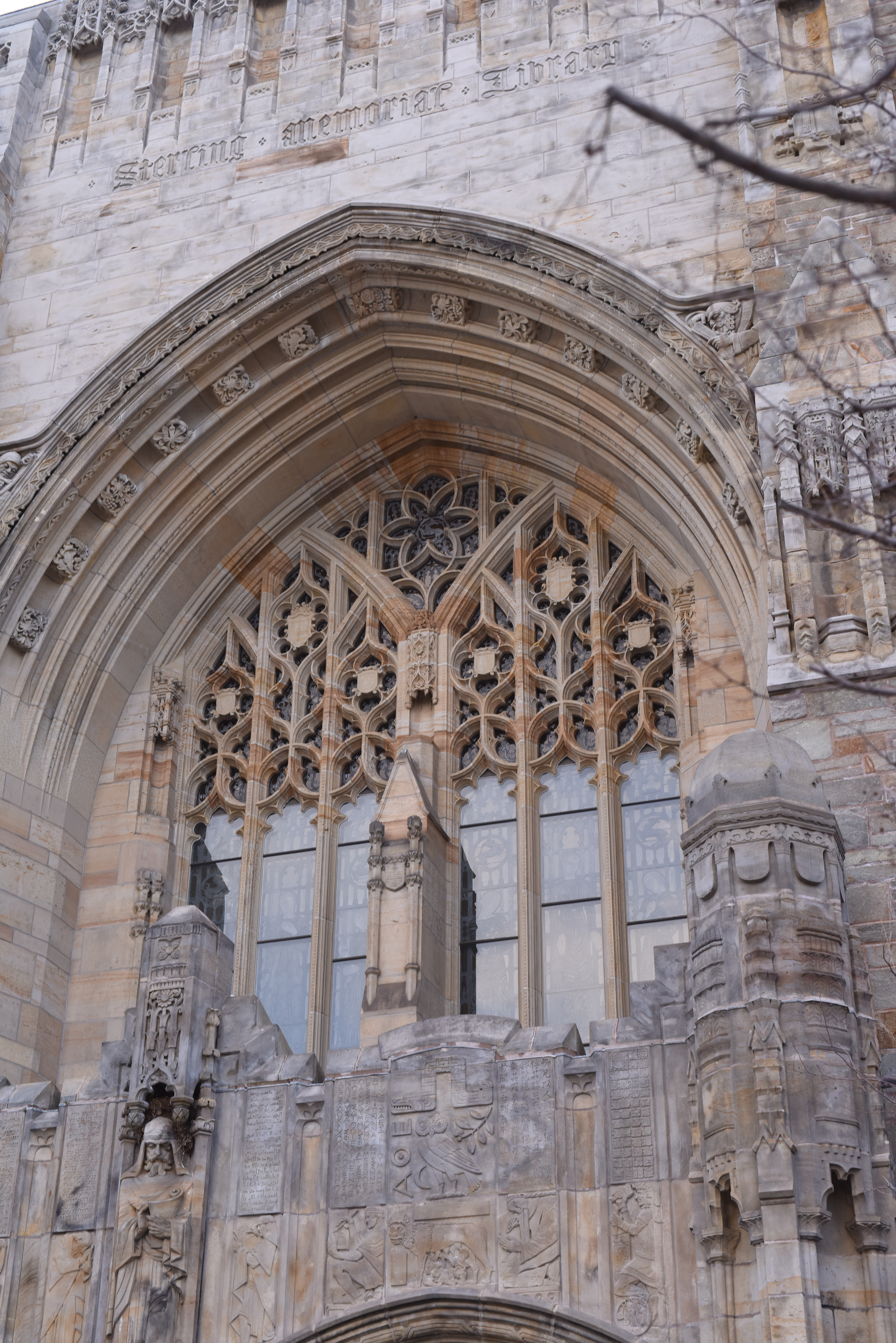
Rene Paul Chambellan's work graces the Sterling Memorial Library at Yale.

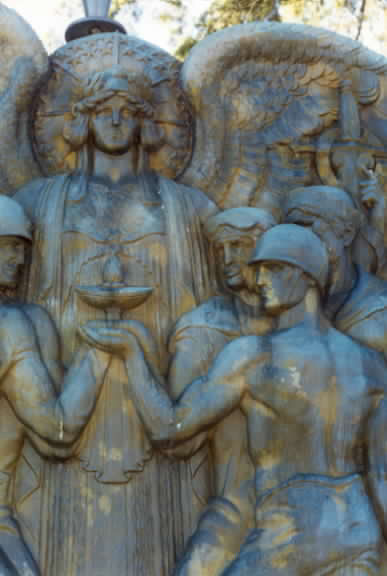
World War II Memorial, Midland, Michigan

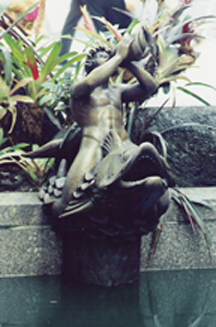
One of several promenade fountains at Rockefeller Center
