= Beekman Tower =

Residential skyscraper in Manhattan, New York

Beekman Tower Hotel
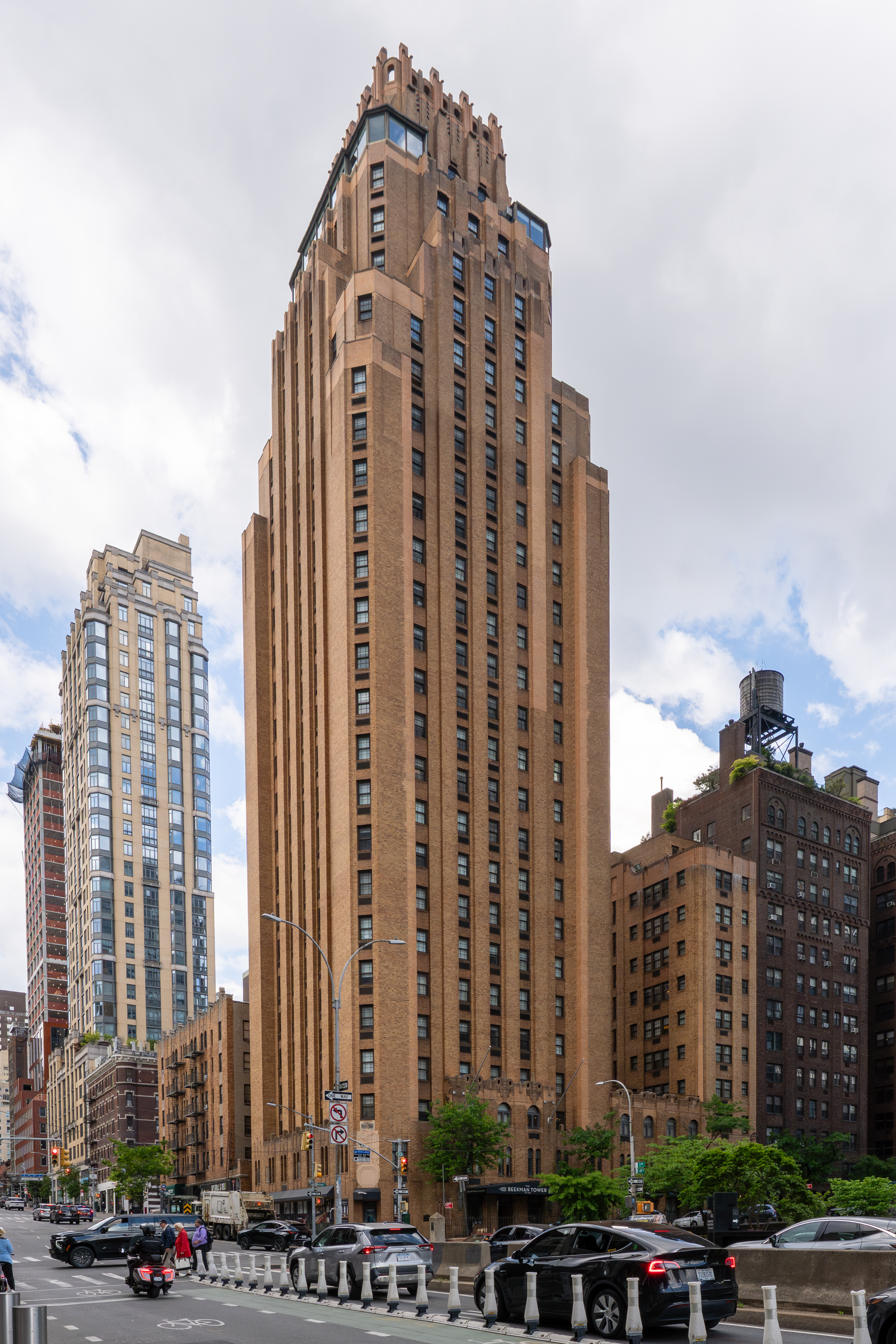
- Interactive map of the Beekman Tower Hotel area
- Former names: The Panhellenic, Panhellenic Tower

General information
- Architectural style: Art Deco
- Location: 1-7 Mitchell Place; Turtle Bay, Manhattan, New York, US
- Coordinates: 40°45′12″N 73°57′58″W
- Construction started: 1927
- Completed: 1928
- Operator: RESIDE Worldwide

Height
- Height: 287 feet (87 m)

Technical details
- Floor count: 26

Design and construction
- Architect: John Mead Howells

New York City Landmark
- Designated: February 13, 1998
- Reference no.: 1972

The Beekman Tower, also known as the Panhellenic Tower, is a 26-story Art Deco skyscraper situated at the corner of First Avenue and East 49th Street in Midtown Manhattan, New York City. The building was constructed between 1927 and 1928 and was designed by John Mead Howells.

The Beekman Tower had been built for the Panhellenic Association's New York chapter as a club and hotel for women in college sororities. However, due to a lack of patronage, it was opened up to non-sorority women and men by the mid-1930s. It was later converted into a hotel and then corporate apartments.

The Beekman Tower contains a design with numerous setbacks, chamfers at its corners, and a massing that abuts onto the boundaries of its lot. Its sculptural ornamentation was designed by Rene Paul Chambellan in the Art Deco style with Gothic influences. In 1998, the New York City Landmarks Preservation Commission made the building an official city landmark.

== Architecture ==
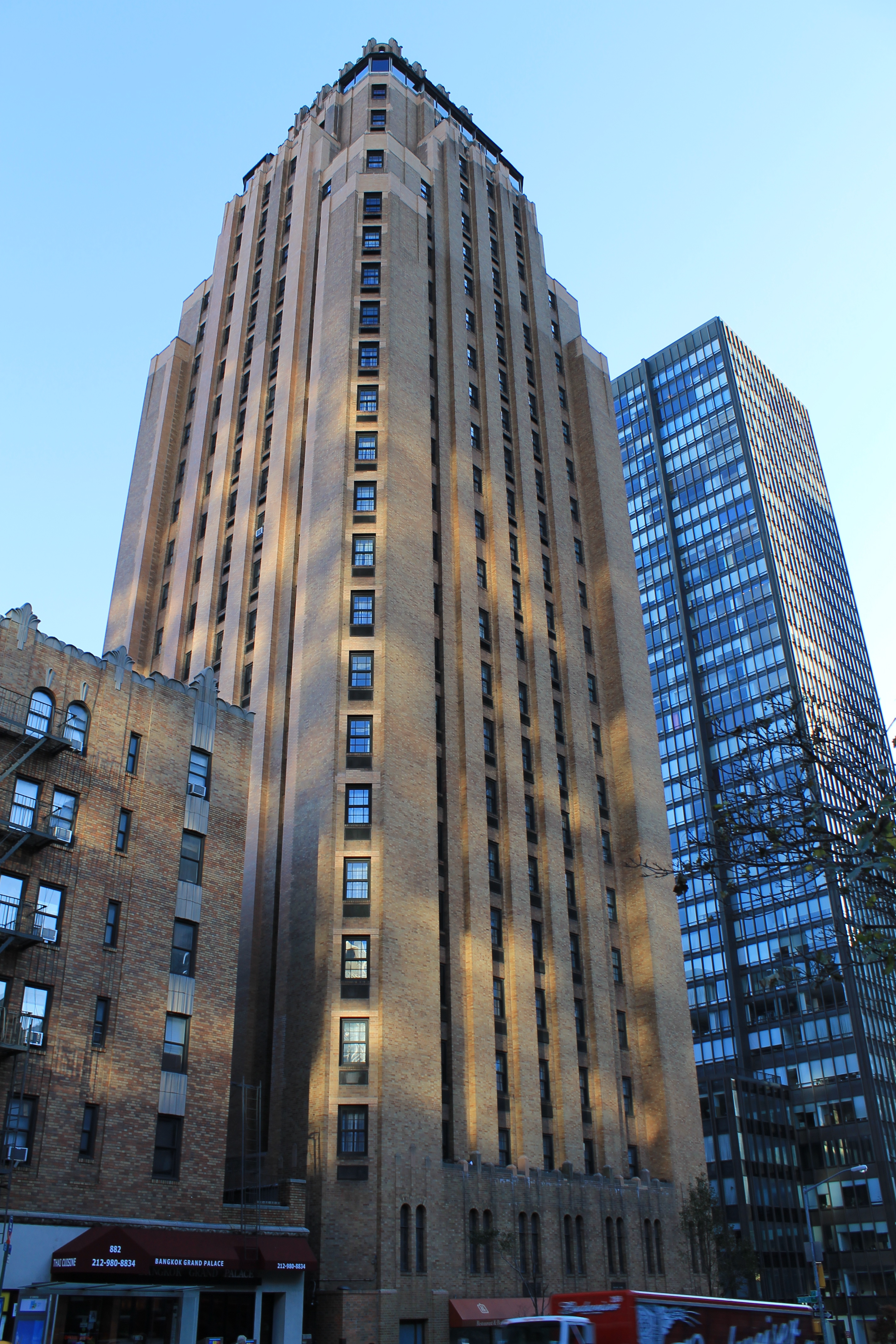
Viewed from First Avenue and 50th Street

The Beekman Tower is located at the northeast corner of First Avenue and Mitchell Place/49th Street. (Note: Mitchell Place and 49th Street are parallel and adjacent to each other, but Mitchell Place runs atop a ridge directly to the north of 49th Street. The building is located on the northern side of Mitchell Place and on the eastern side of First Avenue.) It has a frontage of 81 feet (25 m) on First Avenue and 126 feet (38 m) on Mitchell Place. The building consists of three portions. The westernmost portion, abutting First Avenue, is a 26-story tower with a square floor plan and short setbacks. The central portion contained a two-story event space with another entrance to Mitchell Place. The easternmost portion was an eight-story, 18-foot (5.5 m)-wide annex.

The design was inspired by two plans for the Tribune Tower in Chicago, as well as the American Radiator Building at 40th Street in Midtown Manhattan. Howells's plan incorporated the setback massing used in the Tribune Tower design by Finnish-American architect Eliel Saarinen, while incorporating the corners, lines, and decorations from Raymond Hood's final designs for both the Tribune Tower and the American Radiator Building. The decoration of the Beekman Tower was largely derived from geometric massing rather than ornamental decoration. This contrasted with the Gothic-style Tribune Tower and the Gothic and Art Deco-style American Radiator Building, which were both ornately decorated.

=== Facade ===
The facade materials were colored so as "to produce the impression that the building has been built out of, or carved out of one material". The base is largely two stories tall, with two leaded-glass windows within each of the second-story bays. An entrance to the tower portion of the building is located at the building's southwestern corner, at First Avenue and Mitchell Place. The hotel entrance further east on Mitchell Place is distinctive in that it contains a three-story-tall base with three bays, separated by wide pilaster strips, as well as cast-stone moldings. There are three Art Deco sculptural panels designed by Rene Chambellan: one at the corner and two on Mitchell Place. The panel above the corner depicts a floral motif above an octagon, while the other two panels resemble "frozen fountains". On the third story of the Mitchell Place entrance, there were formerly tripartite windows topped with lunettes, which were later replaced with casement windows.

The building's western section contains a tower section, measuring 75 feet (23 m) square and rising 24 stories above the two-story base. Each of the tower's corners contain a small pier with a single column of windows. The tower's four sides contain piers that rise to the 24th floor, with recessed window bays located between them. The recessed bays, as well as vertical recesses within the piers in the upper levels of the building, were intended to create a shadow-like effect. The roofline of the building contains various ornamentation, while the base contained Greek-letter designs.

The building's central section consists of a three-story wing that was originally an auditorium/event space. This portion is 33 feet (10 m) wide by 81 feet (25 m) deep, and its 33-foot-wide southern elevation contains four bays divided by pilaster strips.

The building's eastern section is ten stories high with a penthouse on the roof and measures 18 feet (5.5 m) wide by 81 feet deep. It contains facades to the south and west, as well as a setback at the penthouse level. The southern facade is divided into two bays, with the western bay being wider. The western facade, overlooking the auditorium/event space, is divided into seven bays.

=== Features ===
The base of the Beekman Tower's western portion was built with administrative and common areas such as lounges, reception areas, and a dining room, while there were shops at ground level on the First Avenue side. Above the base, there were 380 bedrooms, many with balconies, as well as a fourth-floor roof garden above the event space. The building, as designed, has two emergency staircases (one at the north and the other at the southeast corner), as well as three elevators. The Beekman Tower's eastern portion contained apartments, a gymnasium, and hotel offices. A service alley ran along the north side of the building.

There was a terrace or "solarium" on the 26th floor, surrounded by balconies, which initially served as a gathering place for female residents. In 1940, the solarium became a bar called Top of the Tower. The lounge contained dark tones and curved patterns that drew attention away from its unusual floor plan, as well as features like pendant-shaped lights, elevator doors with foliage designs, and French style furniture. The bar was expanded in 1959 by enclosing the balconies around the solarium, and then expanded and renovated again in the late 20th century. The bar operated until 2013 and was subsequently renovated by Merchants Hospitality Inc. and reopened in 2018 as a bar named Ophelia.

== History ==
In the years following World War I, there had been a great increase in the number of female college students, which had long been underrepresented in higher education compared to their male counterparts. Most of these women planned to go into business, professional or social-science careers after graduation, so they planned to move to urban areas with suitable jobs. However, there was a shortage of housing units available in New York City due to inflation and rent controls implemented during World War I, and the few available apartments tended to be overly expensive. Moreover, options such as hotels and lodges tended to be biased toward men, while self-supporting women's homes mostly catered toward the immigrants and the working class.

=== Planning and construction ===
The Panhellenic Association's New York chapter announced plans for a lodge for female students and graduates in 1921. The Panhellenic Association had concluded that several existing clubs were not suitable short-term housing options due to "long waiting lists", so it proposed a building that could house up to 400 women at a time. As indicated by the association's name (which meant "all Greek"), the building would serve members of various Greek-letter sororities. At the time, the association thought that the building might be ready by 1923. Donn Barber was hired in October 1922 to design the building, and a corporation was created to issue preferred and common stock to finance the building's construction. The restrictions on the common stock caused a delay in construction, and a sufficient number of shares of stock would not be sold until 1925.

In 1926, the project was taken over by Emily Eaton Hepburn, a suffragist and activist whose husband had died four years prior. She was tasked with hiring a new architect after Barber's death. Hepburn chose John Mead Howells because she believed he had "a great interest in the housing problem". Hepburn announced the purchase of the Panhellenic's site in March 1927, and construction began on October 10, 1927, with the groundbreaking ceremony held on November 13. The ceremonial laying of the cornerstone occurred on May 20, 1928, halfway through construction. The building initially only consisted of the 26-story tower at First Avenue and Mitchell Place, and the two-story auditorium to the east. During the construction process, Howells filed plans for an eight-story wing to the east of the auditorium.

=== Use ===
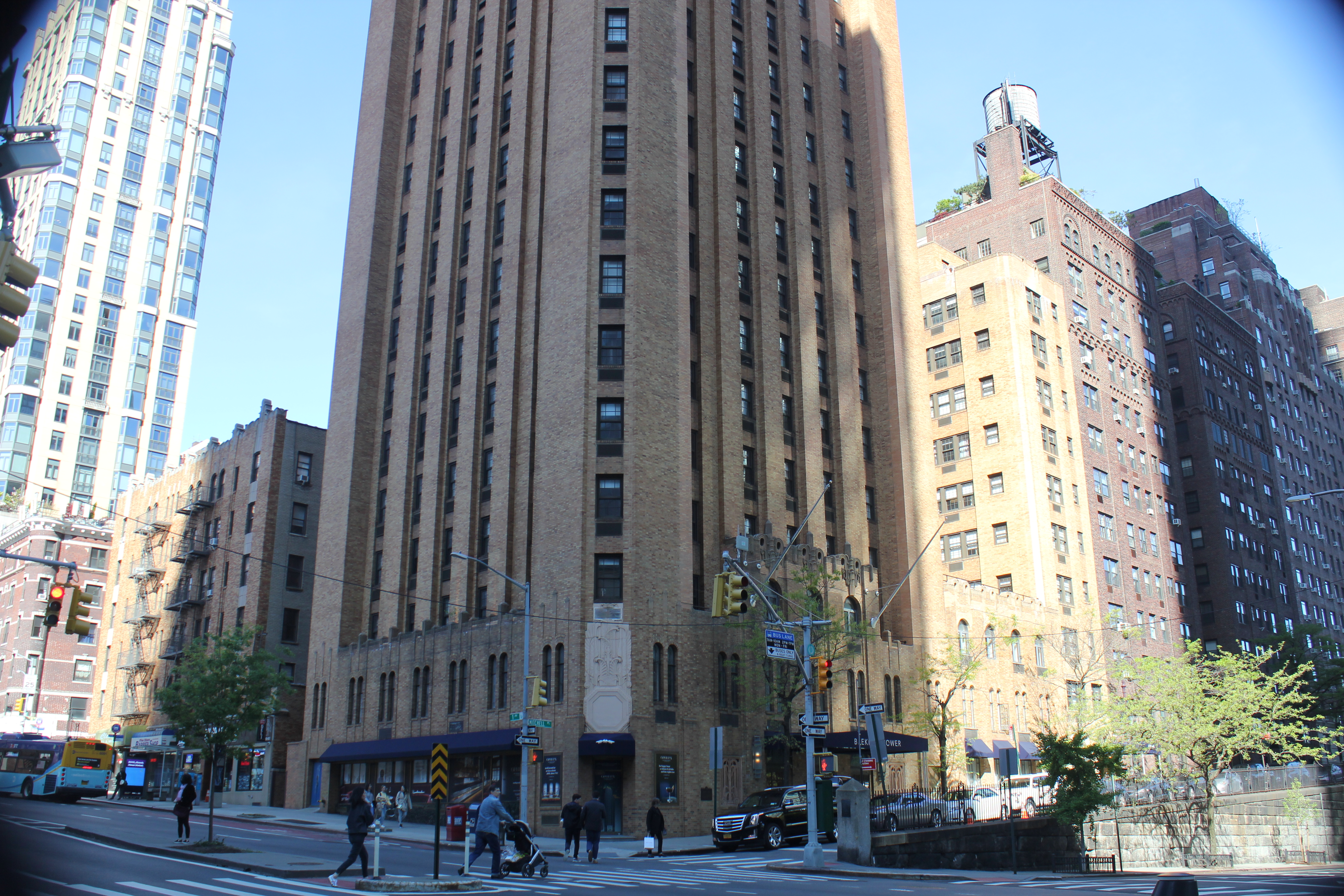
Seen from across First Avenue and 49th Street

The building opened in October 1928. Hepburn gave the building to the sorority by the end of 1928, and the following year, a sorority publication claimed that the Panhellenic Tower was the only women-owned and managed hotel in New York.

Initially, the Panhellenic Tower was seen as successful. Hepburn went on to develop 2 Beekman Place at the opposite end of Mitchell Place; the entire area became known as Beekman Hill, one of the most prestigious places in New York City. However, because of a lack of patronage during the Great Depression, the hotel was opened to non-sorority guests in 1931 and to men in 1934. After the hotel was made available to men, it was renamed Beekman Tower (Panhellenic) to present a more inviting image to both genders. Other improvements included the conversion of the building's rooftop solarium into a bar in 1940; the conversion of the retail space on First Avenue into restaurant space in 1959; and the addition of air conditioning in 1960.

The sorority sold the building to investors in 1964, and it became a conventional hotel. The architect, Sidney Goldhammer, installed bathrooms and kitchenettes in each room, as well as building apartments within the former event spaces. After the conversion of the Beekman Hotel, its clients mostly came from the United Nations, whose headquarters is located nearby, as well as from large companies. The hotel's guests included actor Geraldine Chaplin, musicians Pearl Bailey and Frank Zappa, and UN delegates. After a period of deterioration, the lobby and suites were refurbished between 1989 and 1991. The New York City Landmarks Preservation Commission designated the building as an official city landmark on February 13, 1998.

The Beekman Tower Hotel operated until 2013, when it was sold to Silverstein Properties, who also developed the new World Trade Center. Silverstein converted the building's suites to long-term furnished corporate apartments. Silverstein later sold the property; by 2018, the Beekman Tower was managed by RESIDE Worldwide. Meridian Capital Group refinanced the building for $70 million in 2017. By 2022, the hotel was operated by Wyndham Hotels & Resorts and was known as The Beekman Tower, Trademark Collection by Wyndham.

== Critical reception ==
The Beekman Tower was widely lauded upon its completion, even receiving international recognition when several French architecture publications reported on the structure. The New Yorker stated that the Beekman Tower was "a glorious building on a glorious site and a marvellous example of modernists not gone berserk", while The New York Times said that the building was "an outstanding example of American skyscraper architecture". In 1929, the year after the building opened, the First Avenue Association gave the building an "outstanding architectural merit" award.

Later criticism was mixed. Robert A. M. Stern wrote in 1987 that the building "marked an advance" from the American Radiator Building and Tribune Tower. Christopher Gray of The New York Times wrote in 1991 that before the headquarters of the United Nations was built, the structure was "an out-of-place landmark". The Beekman Tower's design was the inspiration for several other structures such as the Reynolds Building in Winston-Salem, North Carolina.
