= Daily News Building =

Office skyscraper in Manhattan, New York

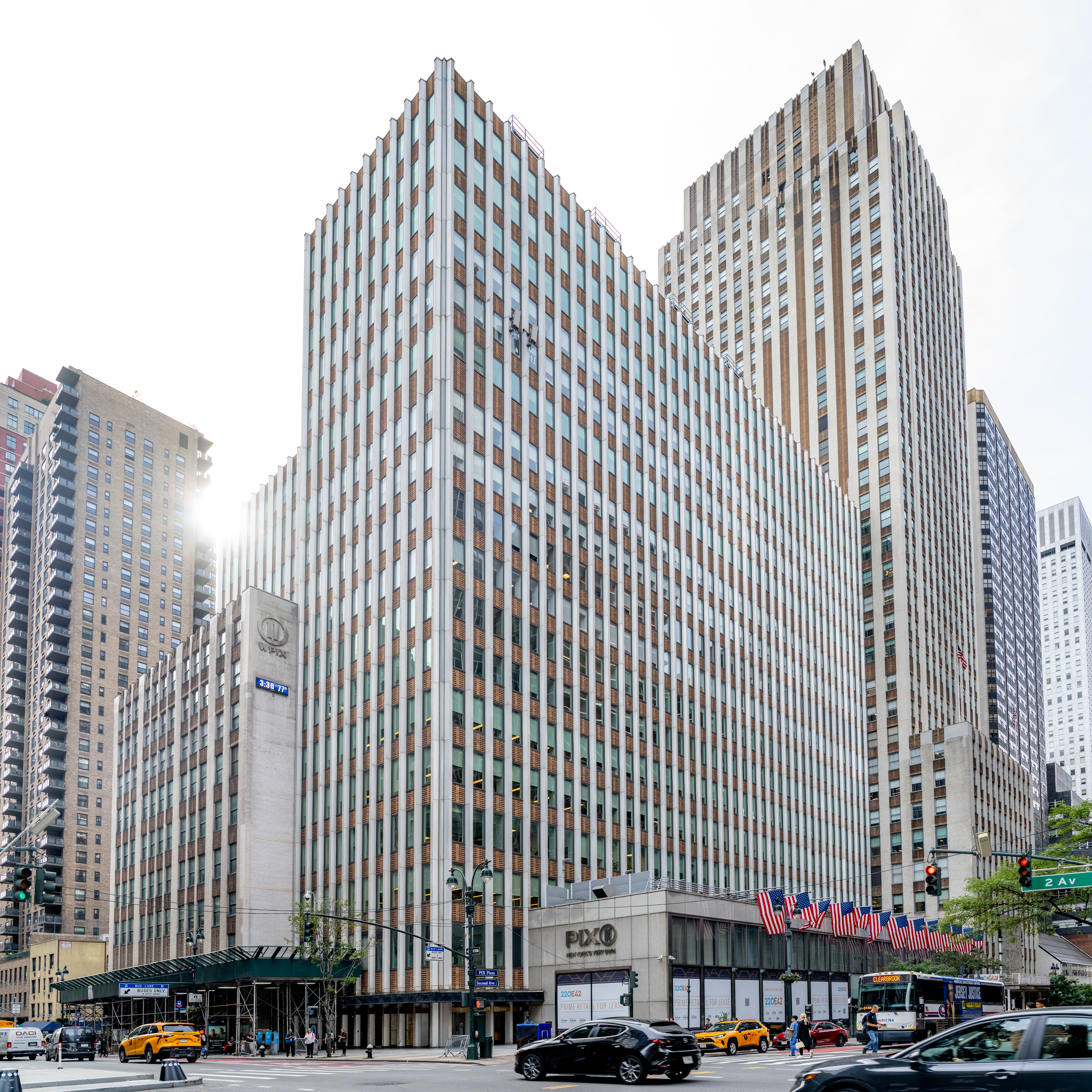
- Viewed from Second Avenue and 42nd Street, looking southwest

General information
- Type: Office
- Architectural style: Art Deco
- Location: 220 East 42nd Street, Manhattan, New York, United States
- Coordinates: 40°44′59″N 73°58′23″W
- Groundbreaking: September 1928
- Completed: July 23, 1930
- Renovated: 1957–1960 (annex)
- Owner: SL Green (51%), Meritz Alternative Investment Management (49%)

Height
- Roof: 476 ft (145 m)

Technical details
- Floor count: 36
- Floor area: 1,009,700 ft^{2} (93,800 m^{2})

Design and construction
- Architects: Raymond Hood and John Mead Howells (original); Harrison & Abramovitz (annex)

U.S. National Historic Landmark
- Designated: June 29, 1989
- Reference no.: 82001191

U.S. National Register of Historic Places
- Designated: November 14, 1982
- Reference no.: 82001191

New York State Register of Historic Places
- Designated: September 27, 1982
- Reference no.: 06101.001686

New York City Landmark
- Designated: July 28, 1981
- Reference no.: 1049
- Designated entity: Facade

New York City Landmark
- Designated: March 10, 1998
- Reference no.: 1982
- Designated entity: Interior: Lobby

The Daily News Building (also the News Building) is a skyscraper at 220 East 42nd Street in the Midtown East neighborhood of Manhattan, New York City, United States. The original tower, designed by Raymond Hood and John Mead Howells in the Art Deco style and completed in 1930, was one of several major developments constructed on 42nd Street around that time. A similarly styled expansion, designed by Harrison & Abramovitz, was completed in 1960. When it originally opened, the building received mixed reviews and was described as having a utilitarian design. The Daily News Building is a National Historic Landmark, and its exterior and lobby are New York City designated landmarks.

The edifice occupies a rectangular site adjoined by 41st Street to the south, Second Avenue to the east, and 42nd Street to the north. It consists of a 36-story tower rising 476 feet (145 m), along with a 14-story printing plant on 41st Street and an 18-story annex on 42nd Street. There is a large carved-granite entrance at 42nd Street, leading to a rotunda lobby with a rotating painted globe. The facade is divided vertically into bays of windows separated by white-brick sections of wall, with brick spandrel panels between windows on different stories. The massing, or general shape, includes several setbacks on higher floors.

After the New York Daily News acquired land on 42nd Street in February 1928, the paper's founder Joseph Medill Patterson commissioned Hood and Howells to design a building there. The architects filed blueprints with the Manhattan Bureau of Buildings in June 1928, and the Daily News started moving into the building in February 1930, with the lobby opening that July. The newspaper filed plans in 1944 for the annex, work on which began in 1957 after additional land was acquired. The Daily News' parent, Tribune Media, sold the building in 1982 to a limited partnership led by the La Salle Street Fund. The newspaper downsized its offices there over the next decade before moving out entirely in 1995, and its space was rented out to other tenants. SL Green Realty bought the building in 2003 and sold a partial ownership stake to Meritz Alternative Investment Management in 2021.

== Site ==
The Daily News Building, also known as the News Building, is at 220 East 42nd Street in the Midtown East neighborhood of Manhattan, New York City, United States. The site is bounded by 42nd Street to the north, Second Avenue to the east, 41st Street to the south, and a private alley called Kempner Place to the west. The New York City Subway's Grand Central–42nd Street station (4, 5, 6, <6>, 7, <7>, and S trains), the Chrysler Building, and the Socony-Mobil Building are all one block to the west. In addition, the Pfizer Building is across 42nd Street to the north, and Tudor City and the Ford Foundation Building are across Second Avenue to the east.

== Architecture ==
Emporis and The Skyscraper Center describe the building as being approximately 476 feet (145 m) tall with 36 floors. The original portions of the building were designed by Raymond Hood and John Mead Howells as the headquarters of the New York Daily News. In contrast to Hood's earlier designs for the Tribune Tower in Chicago and the American Radiator Building in New York, both of which had Gothic ornament, the original structure is designed in the Art Deco style and lacks Gothic decoration. Hood designed the building around the Daily News' practical needs, rather than based on aesthetics, though he did not "feel that the News Building is worse looking than some other buildings". According to Hood, both the owner and architect had agreed that "the most simple and direct way to get an effective exterior" was to incorporate colorful features. Harrison & Abramovitz designed the annex, which was completed in 1960.

=== Form ===
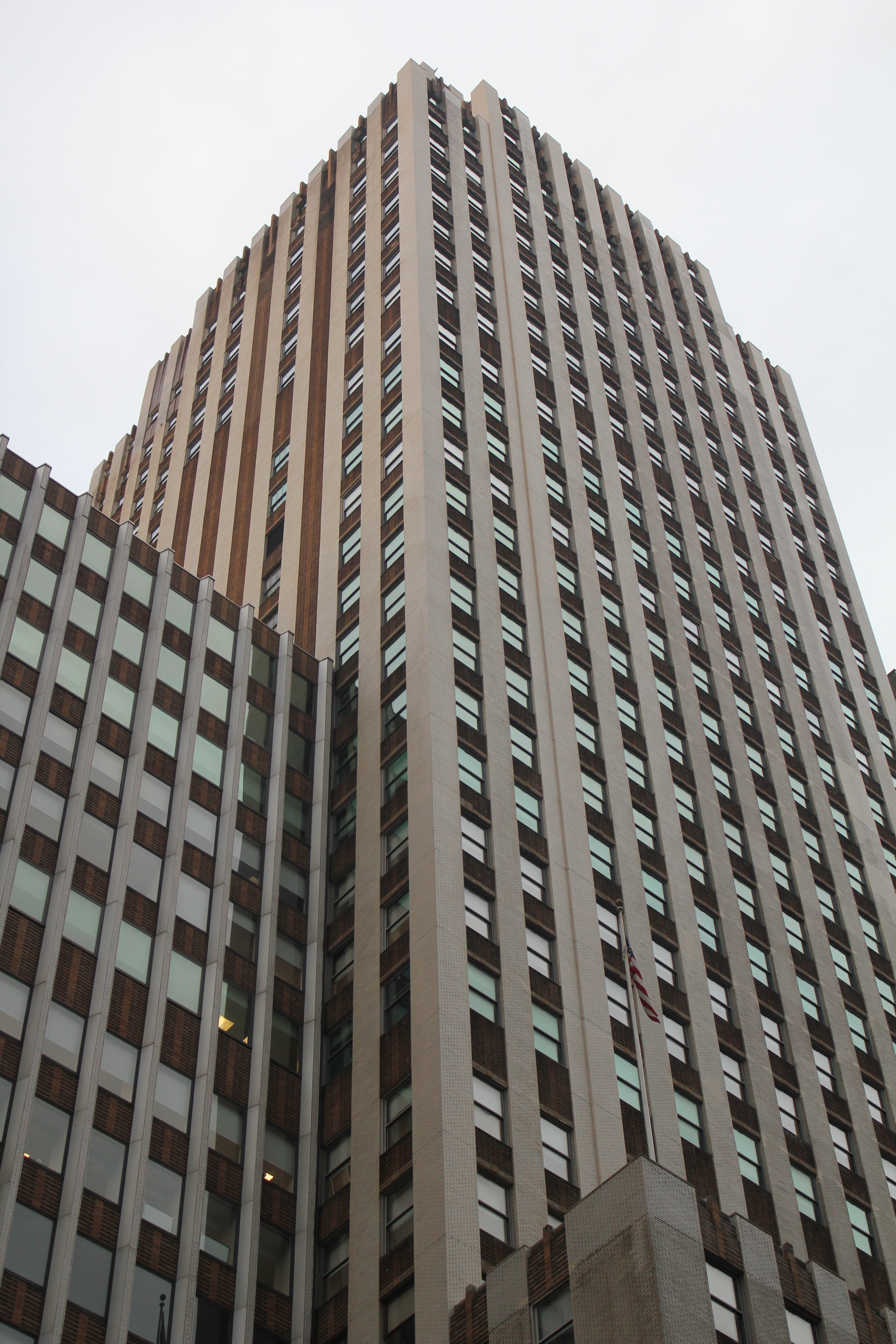
The original tower (right) and the northeastern annex (left) as seen from 42nd Street, looking southwest

The building consists of three sections. The two original portions constitute an L-shaped structure with a 36-story tower facing both 41st and 42nd streets, as well as a printing plant on 41st Street. These sections have a combined frontage of 90 feet (27 m) on 42nd Street and a frontage of 300 feet (91 m) on 41st Street. On the northeastern portion of the plot, at the corner of 42nd Street and Second Avenue, is Harrison & Abramovitz's 18-story annex.

The original structure's massing or general shape—with several setbacks on all sides—was influenced by the requirements of the city's zoning code. The tower's northern elevation along 42nd Street contains one large setback at the 9th story. (Note: The larger setbacks are two bays deep, and the smaller setbacks are one bay deep. Each bay corresponds to the width of one column of windows. Where applicable, the locations of each setback correspond to the floor above the setback.) The southern elevation has small setbacks at the 7th and 13th stories, as well as larger setbacks at the 27th story and just below the mechanical penthouses on the roof. The setbacks on the northern and southern elevations are visible from the west, creating a zigzag effect. These setbacks can also be seen on the eastern elevation, whose northernmost seven bays protrude slightly up to the 33rd story. The printing plant was originally nine stories high; an additional five stories, dating from the late 1950s, are set back from the original plant.

=== Facade ===
==== Tower ====
The windows are arranged vertically into bays that measure 4.75 feet (1.4 m) wide; on each story, there is one window every 9 feet (2.7 m), creating a uniform fenestration or window layout. Hood claimed that the windows were laid in vertical bands so the offices inside could be arranged more flexibly, though other observers stated that the windows could have been arranged in horizontal bands instead. The windows on different stories are separated horizontally by spandrel panels with black and reddish-brown bricks. The spandrel panels on the lower floors contain geometric patterns, while those on the upper floors depict simpler, horizontal bars. Between each bay are white-brick piers, or vertical bands of wall, which The New York Times likened to "tall piles of newspapers". The piers are similar to those that Hood had designed for 3 East 84th Street—where Daily News publisher Joseph Medill Patterson lived. The spandrel panels just below each setback are decorated with miniature setbacks, while the tops of the piers terminate abruptly.

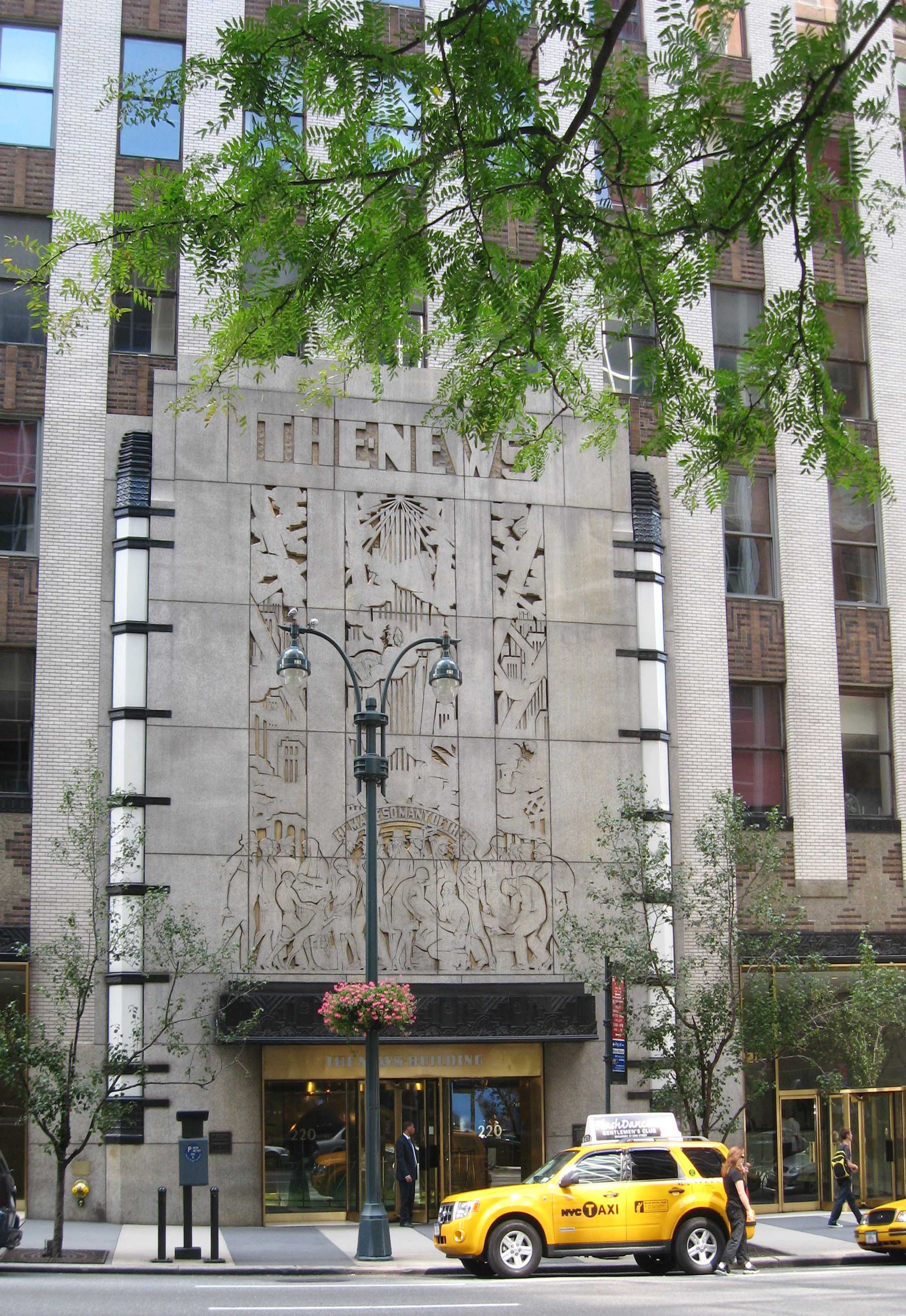
The main entrance, with a bas-relief designed by Hood, seen in 2008

Hood decided to add "a small explosion of architectural effect" to the entrance and lobby, since he was given a $150,000 budget for their design. The granite-clad main entrance, at the base of the tower on 42nd Street, is three stories tall and five bays wide. Over the entrance is a carving of the phrase "The News", below which is a large bas-relief designed by Hood. The bas-relief has carvings of people and the phrase "He Made So Many of Them". The latter quotation was attributed to Abraham Lincoln and referenced the "common people" to whom the Daily News was intended; (Note: According to Hood's assistant and biographer Walter Kilham, this was likely a misquote.) the figure directly below the word "He" may represent Lincoln. The entrance is flanked by glass pylons with bronze ornamentation and horizontal bronze strips. On either side of the main entrance are smaller storefront entrances, which are topped by a horizontal frieze with white brick. The western elevation bears a granite inscription of a quote from Patterson, proclaiming the building as "Home of the News", while the southern elevation has five loading docks.

The top of the facade is plain in design, extending just high enough above the roof to conceal the elevator rooms and mechanical spaces. Hood had initially been conflicted about how to design the top stories, and one account has it that Frank Lloyd Wright advised Hood to "just cut the top off". Wright reportedly retracted his suggestion after being confronted by Hood's assistant Walter Kilham. According to the architect Kenneth MacKenzie Murchison, Hood put a tripod with a tin can on the roof after people complained that the building lacked a finial.

==== Other portions ====
The original printing plant on 41st Street is similar in style to the tower, though the bays are grouped in sets of three. Each grouping is separated by wide white-brick piers, while the windows in each grouping are subdivided by narrower piers. There is a painted frieze above the first story on both the 41st Street and Second Avenue facades, as well as six loading docks along 41st Street.

The annex has a similar design to that of the original facade, although the windows in the annex are larger. Like the original building, the vertical bays each contain one window per floor, and there are light-and-dark-red brick spandrels between different floors; however, the piers between each bay have slightly projecting white-brick piers with aluminum sheathing. The facade of the printing-plant addition is designed in the same manner.

=== Interior ===
The Daily News cites the original structure, comprising the tower and the lower portion of the printing plant, as having a floor area of 663,000 square feet (61,600 m^{2}). The annex covers 270,000 square feet (25,000 m^{2}), and the printing-plant addition covers 76,000 feet (23,000 m), giving the building a total floor area of 1,009,700 square feet (93,800 m^{2}).

==== Lobby ====
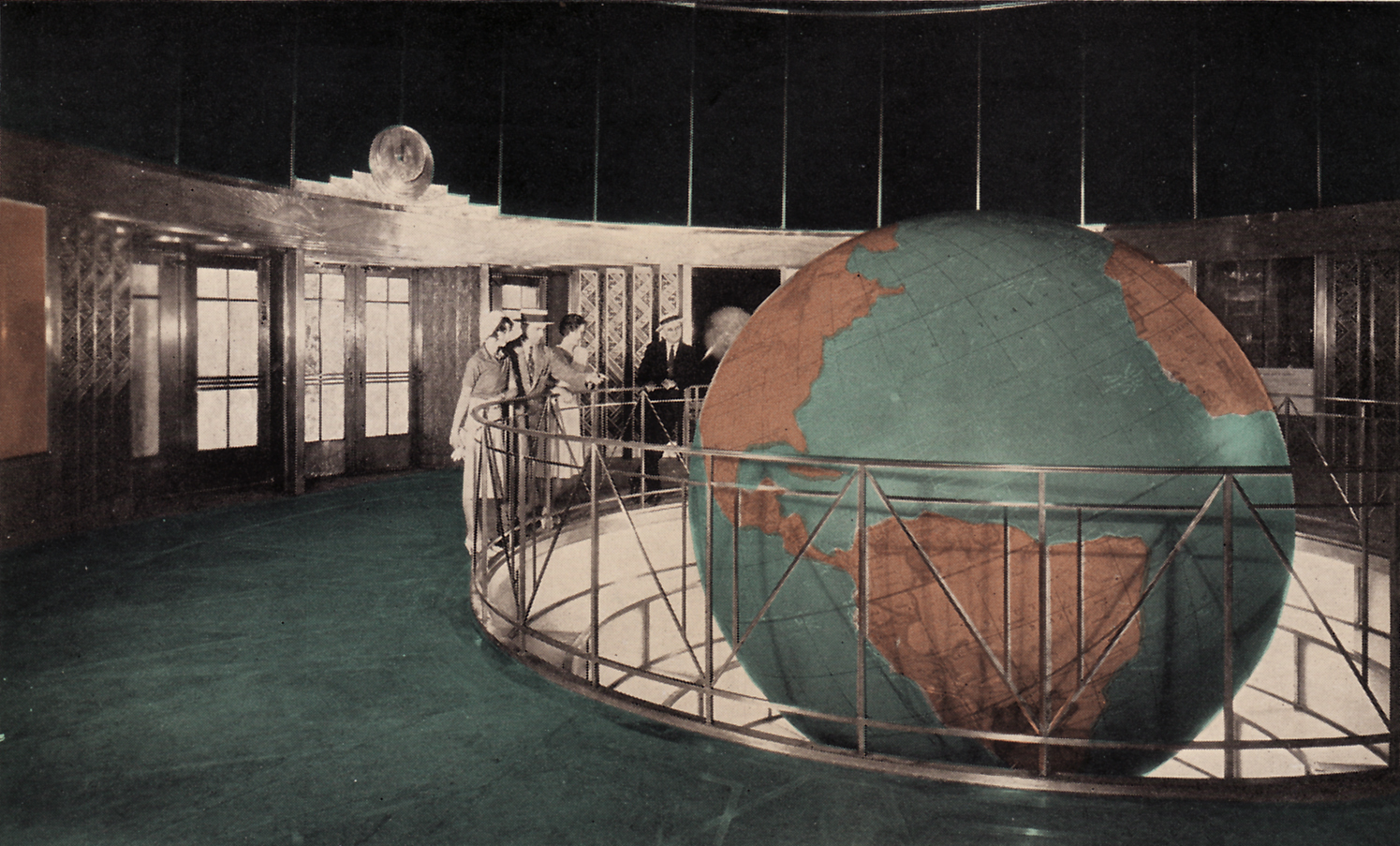
The lobby of the Daily News Building, c. 1941

The 42nd Street entrance leads to the lobby's rotunda, which has a faceted, domed ceiling made of black glass. The ceiling is supported by two closely-spaced marble piers each to the west and east of the rotunda. In a stepped pit underneath is a rotating globe painted by Daniel Putnam Brinley. Conceived by the Daily News as an educational exhibit, the globe measures 12 feet (3.7 m) in diameter (Note: However, the Daily News states that the globe is 17 feet (5.2 m) in diameter.) and includes over 3,000 geographical features. The pit itself contains popular science inscriptions and is recessed 6 feet (1.8 m) into the lobby floor. Within the rest of the lobby, the floor has a terrazzo-and-bronze compass rose, with bronze inscriptions denoting world cities and their distances from the building. Surrounding the rotunda were originally eighteen glass display cases with charts and maps; the display cases also contained meteorology exhibits by James H. Scarr, a U.S. Weather Bureau meteorologist. There were also storefronts to the east and west of the rotunda.

A hallway leads from the west side of the rotunda south to an elevator lobby, which has two banks of elevators. The elevator lobby has bronze grilles and other decorations designed by Rene Paul Chambellan in the Art Deco style. In addition, bronze plaques on the elevator lobby's walls memorialize Daily News employees who fought in major wars. After the building opened, the main lobby became so popular among tourists that Hood built a side entrance for Daily News employees. During the late 1950s, the storefronts on either side of the rotunda were removed and incorporated into the main lobby. The city names on the floor were modified, one of the hallways was extended to Second Avenue, and the glass showcases were replaced with 19 wall panels. J. Henry Weber designed the wall panels, which contain maps, weather charts and equipment, and clocks from different time zones.

Accounts differ on who had the most influence on the lobby's design. Daily News historians credited Patterson with having proposed the lobby's design, while Kilham indicated that Hood had come up with the idea and that Patterson had been skeptical of including a globe in the design. The rotunda's design is reminiscent of Bruno Taut's Glass Pavilion, and the recessed globe was inspired by Napoleon's tomb at Les Invalides.

==== Other stories ====
When the Daily News occupied the printing plant, the press rooms and circulation departments were on the lower floors, while the editorial departments were on the higher floors. The ground story contained the circulation department, mail rooms, and delivery rooms. Above these were a reel room on the second story, followed by 76 printing presses and a visitors' gallery on the third story. The Museum of the Peaceful Arts originally occupied the fourth story, which was reserved for a future expansion of the newspaper's offices. The fifth story could store 8,440 short tons (7,540 long tons; 7,660 t) of paper, while the floor above was devoted to local advertising. The newspaper's photograph studio and editorial department were on the seventh floor, the latter of which was connected to the composing room by pneumatic tubes. Also on that story were the feature, sports, and television departments, with the promotion department on the western side. The newspaper's executive offices and its accounting, personnel, purchasing, and stock departments were housed on the eighth floor.

The main tower contained office lofts separated by movable partitions; some of this space was used by the Daily News and its affiliates. Hood designed Patterson's executive suite, but not the remaining offices on the upper floors.

== History ==
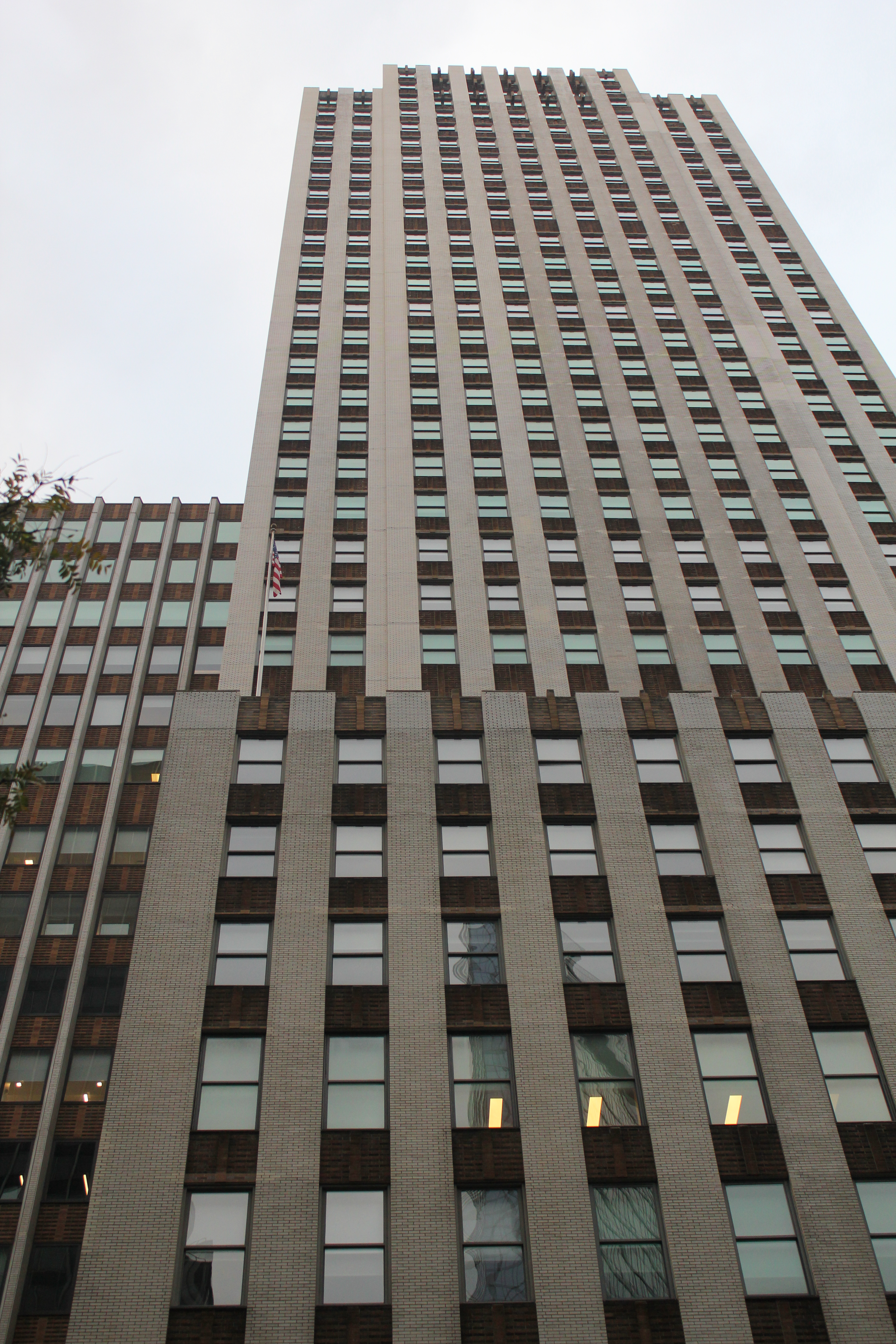
Seen from street level

Joseph Medill Patterson, a member of a large publishing family, founded the Daily News in 1919 as the United States' first widely published daily tabloid. While the Daily News was not an immediate success, it had become the city's largest newspaper by 1925, with a daily circulation of over a million. The newspaper was originally based at 25 City Hall Place in the Civic Center of Lower Manhattan, moving in 1921 to the nearby 23 Park Place; six years later, it sought to relocate again. In looking for a new location, the Daily News followed the example of The New York Times and New York Herald in moving from Lower to Midtown Manhattan. Although Daily News research manager Harry Corash found that the city's population was centered in Queens, east of the East River, it was easier to coordinate newspaper distribution from Manhattan than from Queens.

=== Development ===
==== Planning ====
The site ultimately chosen was on East 42nd Street; the section east of Grand Central Terminal and Lexington Avenue had yet to be developed, and the newspaper's historians called the area "a row of old, assorted, unpretentious structures". Additionally, the site was on the same street as Times Square, where the rival Times's headquarters were located. On February 3, 1928, the Daily News bought a 40,000-square-foot (3,700 m^{2}) tract facing 41st and 42nd streets, between Second and Third avenues, from the Tishman Construction Company for $2.5 million (equivalent to $37 million in 2025 (Note: Johnston, Louis; Williamson, Samuel H. (2023). "What Was the U.S. GDP Then?". MeasuringWorth. United States Gross Domestic Product deflator figures follow the MeasuringWorth series.)). Patterson planned to build a 20-story structure for the Daily News on the site. Less than two weeks later, the newspaper bought another 8,000 square feet (740 m^{2}) at 41st Street and Second Avenue. This gave the Daily News an L-shaped lot measuring approximately 355 feet (108 m) on 41st Street, 125 feet (38 m) on 42nd Street, 99 feet (30 m) on Second Avenue, and 197 feet (60 m) to the west.

Patterson hired Hood and Howells as architects. The pair had previously won a competition to design the Tribune Tower for the Chicago Tribune, which was owned by Patterson's cousin Robert R. McCormick. Hood proposed a tower for the Daily News, but Patterson, who did not want a "monument", initially rejected it. To convince Patterson, Hood framed the tower plan as an "efficient" business decision and prepared numerous models for the building, concluding that it would be most efficient to erect a structure of 35 and 40 stories. Hood presented various floor plans to Patterson every week until Patterson acquiesced on the 11th meeting. Patterson rejected one of Hood's plans, which featured a setback above the third story, since it did not make the most of the site's zoning, which did not mandate a setback until the ninth floor. A plan to use a stone facade was scrapped due to cost, and brick was used instead. Hood carved a plastic model of the building's tapered design, and he drew up plans for a blocky massing with several setbacks.

To the west of the building was the Commercial High School, which the New York City Board of Education was planning to demolish. In February 1929, the Daily News and the Board of Education each agreed to cede 25 feet (7.6 m) for a pedestrian alley, allowing the facade's western elevation to receive natural light; however, only the Daily News' section of the alley was built. Nonetheless, because of the alley's presence, Hood was able to incorporate decorations into the western elevation.

==== Construction ====
Major developments on 42nd Street in 1929
1 Daily News Building
2 Lincoln Building
3 Chanin Building
4 Chrysler Building
5 Tudor City complex

In June 1928, the architects submitted blueprints to the Manhattan Bureau of Buildings for a 36-story building costing $6.6 million (equivalent to $98,000,000 in 2025). In addition to the Daily News, the new structure was to include offices for companies affiliated with the Chicago Tribune. The Hegeman-Harris Company was hired as the general contractor for the project, which was to be completed in 14 months. By February 1929, thirty percent of the office space had been rented, with one tenant alone occupying 100,000 square feet (9,300 m^{2}). International Paper had offered to lend $5 million to the Daily News to fund the building's development, but the loan was ultimately canceled.

Construction of the steel frame was finished in August 1929, and the Daily News Building was almost complete by the end of the year. The Times described the project as one of several high-rise developments that were "radically changing the old-time conditions" along East 42nd Street, along with the Lincoln Building, Chanin Building, Chrysler Building, and Tudor City. In November 1929, several construction workers and craftsmen received awards for "outstanding work" on the building; at that point, the structure was over 75 percent rented. The Daily News started moving into the building in February 1930. The lobby, which was supposed to be completed by that May, did not open to the public until July 23, 1930. The structure, including the newspaper's new printing presses, had cost $10.7 million (equivalent to $164,000,000 in 2025).

=== Daily News use ===
==== Early years and expansion ====
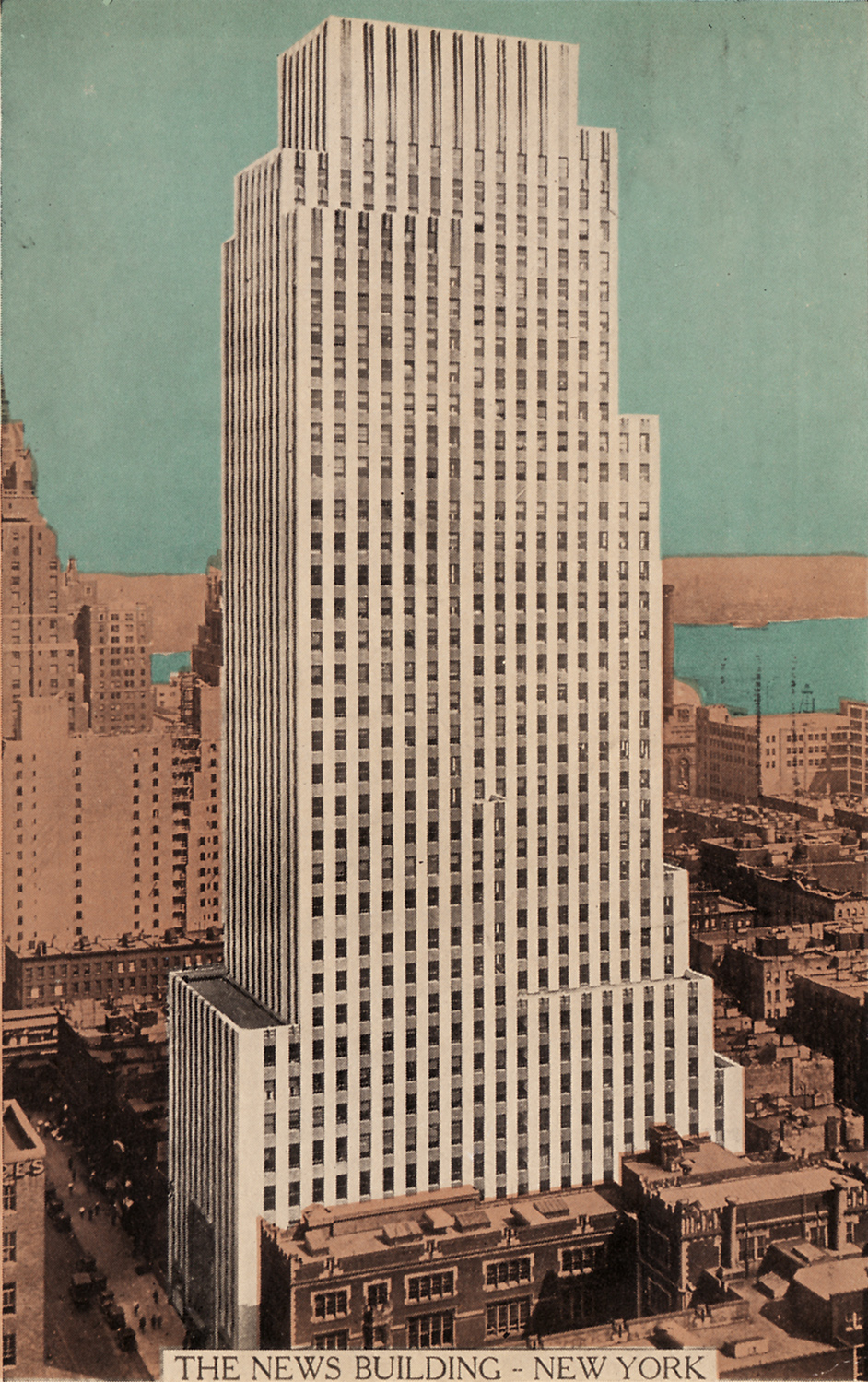
1941 sketch

When the Daily News Building opened, The New Yorker characterized the office space as "actually a factory, done at factory prices", saying that Hood had focused on practicality rather than artistic effect. During the building's first decade, the Daily News rented out space to tenants such as American Locomotive Company subsidiary Alco Products, the Ahrens Publishing Company, the Museum of the Peaceful Arts, a branch of the National City Bank of New York, and United Press International (which moved its headquarters there in 1931). The lobby's research desk was serving 625,000 annual visitors by 1938.

The newspaper filed plans in October 1944 for a 24-story annex at Second Avenue and 41st Street. The annex, designed by Harrison, Fouilhoux & Abramovitz (later Harrison & Abramovitz), would have cost $3 million (equivalent to $44 million in 2025) and was planned to be built after World War II. After Daily News acquired the TV station WPIX, the station's television studio opened at the building in June 1948. WPIX broadcast from the building's 778-foot-high (237 m) mast until 1951, when transmission facilities were relocated to the Empire State Building's 1,400-foot (430 m) mast. The News Syndicate Company, the subsidiary of Tribune Media that published the Daily News, had acquired all of the lots at the southwest corner of 42nd Street and Second Avenue by August 1950, with plans to build a broadcasting station there.

In the late 1950s, as part of a $20 million expansion of the newspaper's facilities (equivalent to $187 million in 2025), Harrison & Abramovitz were hired to design an expansion and renovation of the building, while Turner Construction was hired as the construction contractor. The architects submitted plans for a 19-story annex in May 1957, and excavation of the site started later that year. Construction was delayed by a labor strike during early 1958, and the facade of the annex was substantially completed by April 1959. Daily News president Francis Marion Flynn also oversaw a renovation of the lobby. The expansion was completed in June 1960, and the edifice was 90 percent rented by that August. The project increased the building's floor area to 1,009,700 square feet (93,800 m^{2}). The New York Times described the annex as one of several structures built as part of a "building boom" on Second Avenue between 40th and 45th streets.

==== 1960s to early 1990s ====
By 1964, a combined heating–cooling system was installed in the building. A 61-week-long restoration of the lobby globe was completed three years later, and the globe was repainted for the first time in three decades. The Daily News and the International Paper Company were the main occupants of the building by the 1970s, though the latter moved out in 1978. During that decade, the Daily News installed six-page-wide printing presses as part of a pilot program to increase production.

Tribune Media placed the Daily News and the building for sale in 1981 but had trouble finding a buyer. At the time, media and real-estate concerns cited by The New York Times projected that the building might be worth $150–250 million (equivalent to $449–748 million in 2025), while The Washington Post cited a valuation of $100–135 million (equivalent to $299–404 million in 2025). Several commentators suggested that the newspaper be shuttered, or that the printing presses be relocated, to free up space. To reduce costs, Daily News publisher Robert M. Hunt had proposed shutting down the printing plant and spending $60 million to upgrade a printing plant in Brooklyn. By then, the Daily News' printing operations were split evenly between the Daily News Building and the Brooklyn plant. Though the financier Joe Allbritton tentatively agreed to buy the paper in April 1982, the transaction excluded the building.

Tribune Media agreed in November 1982 to sell the building to 220 East Limited Partnership, a limited partnership led by the La Salle Street Fund. The sale was finalized the next month for approximately $90 million. As part of the sale, the Daily News leased back its office space from the new owners, and the printing and distribution operations were moved to other facilities in the New York metropolitan area. The Daily News removed its printing presses from the building in 1984, freeing up 175,000 square feet (16,300 m^{2}) for commercial use, and it renovated the existing 1 million square feet (93,000 m^{2}) of office space. Tribune Media leased the refurbished offices to tenants such as architectural and law firms, doubling the annual rental rates to between $25 and $35 per square foot ($270 and $380/m^{2}). Through the early 1990s, the Daily News continued to reduce the amount of space it occupied; by then, the structure housed only the paper's business offices and newsrooms, while production and distribution had been relocated to New Jersey.

=== Post-Daily News era ===
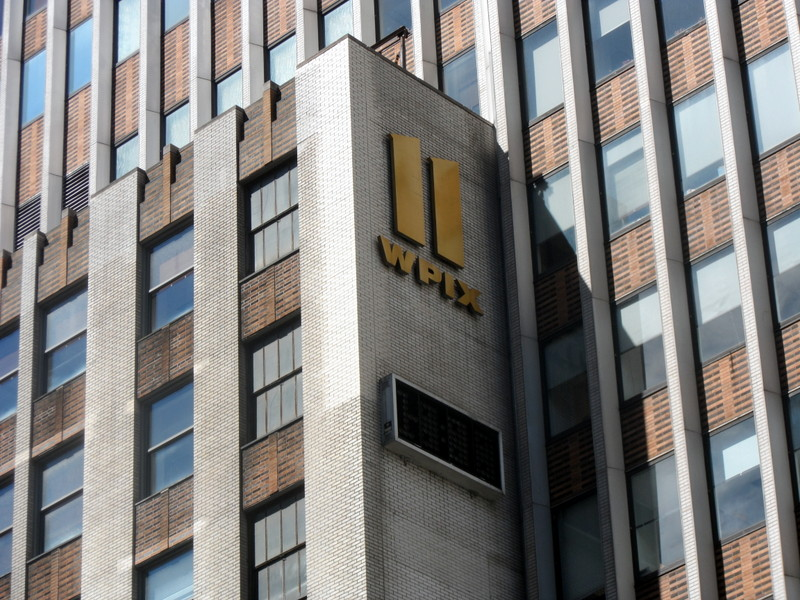
Sign for WPIX on the Daily News Building. The TV station had expanded its production facilities in the old building in 1994.

In October 1994, the Daily News announced that it would relocate its remaining operations within the building to 450 West 33rd Street in Chelsea, Manhattan. At the time, the newspaper occupied 130,000 square feet (12,000 m^{2}) across 21 floors at the Daily News Building, and the newspaper had tried unsuccessfully to extend its lease there by 2 1/2 years. The new headquarters, by contrast, consisted of 112,000 square feet (10,400 m^{2}) on a single floor, since the newspaper no longer needed to occupy so much space due to declining circulation. The new offices had modern technology for the Daily News, and the move would save the newspaper money. WPIX, which had expanded its production facilities in the old building the same year, was to remain in place.

The last Daily News employees relocated in May 1995, at which point the building had over 50 tenants, including Crain Communications and Tribune affiliates WPIX and WQCD-FM. The Daily News Building's owners placed it for sale by January 1996, at which point the building had an occupancy rate of more than 80 percent, despite the departure of the Daily News. The developer Steve Witkoff of Stellar Management, along with JAG Capital, agreed that September to buy the building for $110–115 million. To obtain a $140 million mortgage loan, the new owners leased out most of the vacant space, and the Omnicom Group moved in as the primary tenant in 1997. The building was again being placed for sale by 2001, and the building's owners had narrowed the bids down to three finalists by that May. SL Green Realty won the right to buy the building, finalizing its purchase in 2002 for $265 million. By then, the building was fully occupied, with tenants such as the Tribune's affiliates, Omnicom, Verizon Communications, Value Line, Neuberger Berman, and the United Nations Population Fund.

The Real Deal magazine reported in January 2019 that SL Green was considering selling the property, and the developer Jacob Chetrit agreed to pay $815 million for the building that October. The sale was canceled in March 2020 after Deutsche Bank withdrew its financing as a result of economic uncertainty during the COVID-19 pandemic. SL Green sued Chetrit to obtain the $35 million deposit that he had paid, though this dispute was later settled. When SL Green refinanced the building with a $510 million mortgage that June, the structure had nearly 60 tenants and was almost fully leased. The following year, SL Green sold a 49 percent ownership stake in the building to Meritz Alternative Investment Management for $790 million.

== Tenants ==
As of 2026, the building's mass media tenants include the former Daily News TV broadcast subsidiary WPIX, as well as NewsNation's New York bureau. Other major tenants include the Visiting Nurse Service of New York on 308,000 square feet (28,600 m^{2}), the organization UN Women on 85,000 square feet (7,900 m^{2}), and the nonprofit Young Adult Institute on 75,000 square feet (7,000 m^{2}). The United Nations Development Programme and the consulate general of Brazil in New York City also have offices in the structure.

== Impact ==
=== Reception ===
==== Contemporary ====
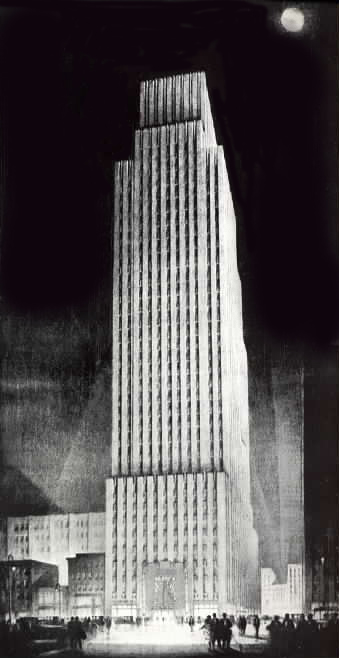
Rendering of the Daily News Building by Hugh Ferriss

Architectural critics had mixed opinions of the design. The architect Frank Scarlett, having viewed a model of the building, considered it to have deviated from the eclectic style that had been popular until the early 20th century. The New Yorker, profiling Hood in 1931, said that the Daily News Building was "a distinctly untraditional building" and that Hood's design had been "daringly successful". Douglas Haskell of The Nation magazine called the facade "almost nothing but a series of stripes", viewing the facade's design as straddling the boundary between art and architecture, and the architect Kenneth MacKenzie Murchison wrote of the facade: "'Stripes' is Mr. Hood's middle name. He can't get away from them." The architectural historian Henry-Russell Hitchcock and the architect Philip Johnson said in 1932 that the setbacks were "brilliantly handled in a way that does not produce a heavy pyramidal mass". The writer Randolph Williams Sexton stated that "the vertical movement [of the building] is unbroken throughout", while another observer, Arthur T. North, said the lobby exhibit was "a genuine contribution to architecture".

After Hood's death in 1934, observers and the media described the Daily News Building as functionalist in nature. for example, The New York Times said that the building's design made him "practically a complete functionalist", while the contemporary modernist architect Harvey Wiley Corbett said in Architectural Forum that the building was a "right about-face [...] from the former eclectic approach". Architectural Forum, the next year, lauded the utilitarian nature of the building's exterior and praised the lobby as "romantic and dramatic".

Some commentary regarded the building as architecturally lacking. For instance, Hitchcock and Johnson perceived the "crisp square termination" of the roof as deceptive because it concealed the mechanical equipment and water tanks there, and the New York Herald Tribune's obituary of Hood expressed a similarly critical sentiment about the roof. Murchison felt that, if the building's exterior had indicated its function, "then the casual passer-by would say that The News Building housed a bed-ticking factory". Another architectural critic, Royal Cortissoz, refused to acknowledge the building as an architectural work, to which Hood reportedly replied, "So much the better". After the annex was completed, the critic Paul Goldberger characterized the addition as a "thoughtful but inadequate companion" to the original tower.

Daily News officials referred to the structure as one of Hood's "triumphs", though most of the paper's praise for the building was directed toward the lobby. Shortly after the building opened, the Daily News published an editorial rebutting modern architecture, saying that its headquarters' design was focused on the "efficient production of newspapers", while another Daily News article praised the lobby for its state-of-the-art exhibit. Hood himself had been dismissive of the building's "architectural beauty" and "composition", instead focusing on its "effect".

==== Retrospective ====
Decades after the building was completed, reviewers compared it with more contemporary architectural works. One guidebook from 1952 stated that the building had an "asymmetrical, almost picturesque" shape, and another book from 1967 described the tower as "one of the best examples" of a slab-shaped skyscraper. Further reviews in the late 20th century described the building as a deviation from popular architectural styles of the time, and as a modern skyscraper that was easily distinguishable from "mediocre metal-and-glass neighbors". Daily News historians wrote in 1971 that the building had "commanded the respect and admiration of the business community", drawing attention to the newspaper's success.

Robert A. M. Stern and the coauthors of his 1987 book New York 1930 wrote that Hood's design was adapted from the massing of Ralph Thomas Walker's Western Union Building, saying the Daily News Building's shape "suggested the possibilities of a tall building as a continuous extrusion". George Everard Kidder Smith described the building in 1996 as "all Hood and all very fresh", praising the design of the setbacks. Three years later, the architectural writer Eric Nash said that Hood had avoided "romanticizing the skyscraper as a carved mountain" as contemporaries like Walker and Ferriss had, instead using a simple exterior with an abstractly-arranged massing. In the early 2000s, David W. Dunlap of the rival New York Times called the structure "one of America's great newspaper buildings", as compared with the Times's then-headquarters at 229 West 43rd Street, which he considered "a three-dimensional understatement". Justin Davidson of New York magazine wrote in 2017 that Hood had "produced an artistic creation, a jazzy concoction of syncopated setbacks and white-brick stripes shooting toward the sky. In a city of flat façades, this was a sculpture to be appreciated from all sides."

=== Landmark designations ===
The New York City Landmarks Preservation Commission (LPC) hosted hearings in 1966 to determine whether the Daily News Building should be designated as a city landmark. However, the LPC did not designate the exterior as a New York City landmark until 1981; in granting the exterior landmark status, the LPC called the tower "one of the city's major Art Deco presences". The building became a National Historic Landmark in 1989, and some of the first-floor interior spaces became a city landmark nine years later. Harrison and Abramowitz's additions are excluded from the National Historic Landmark and New York City landmark designations.

=== Media depictions ===
Hugh Ferriss drew a rendering of the building in 1930, shortly after its completion. Smithsonian magazine wrote that Ferriss's drawing depicted the structure as "a streamlined vertical monument" and that the sketch had had such a powerful effect because "everything Ferriss drew looked like it belonged in a comic book". The shape helped inspire the Superman comic book franchise's fictional Daily Planet headquarters. In addition, the building stood in for the Daily Planet headquarters in the 1978 film Superman: The Movie, which was being shot there when the 1977 New York City blackout began on July 13–14. According to the movie's screenwriter Tom Mankiewicz, the edifice was chosen as a filming location because the lobby's globe resembled the Daily Planet logo.

== See also ==
- Art Deco architecture of New York City
- List of New York City Designated Landmarks in Manhattan from 14th to 59th Streets
- List of National Historic Landmarks in New York City
- National Register of Historic Places listings in Manhattan from 14th to 59th Streets
