= John Mead Howells =

American architect (1868–1959)

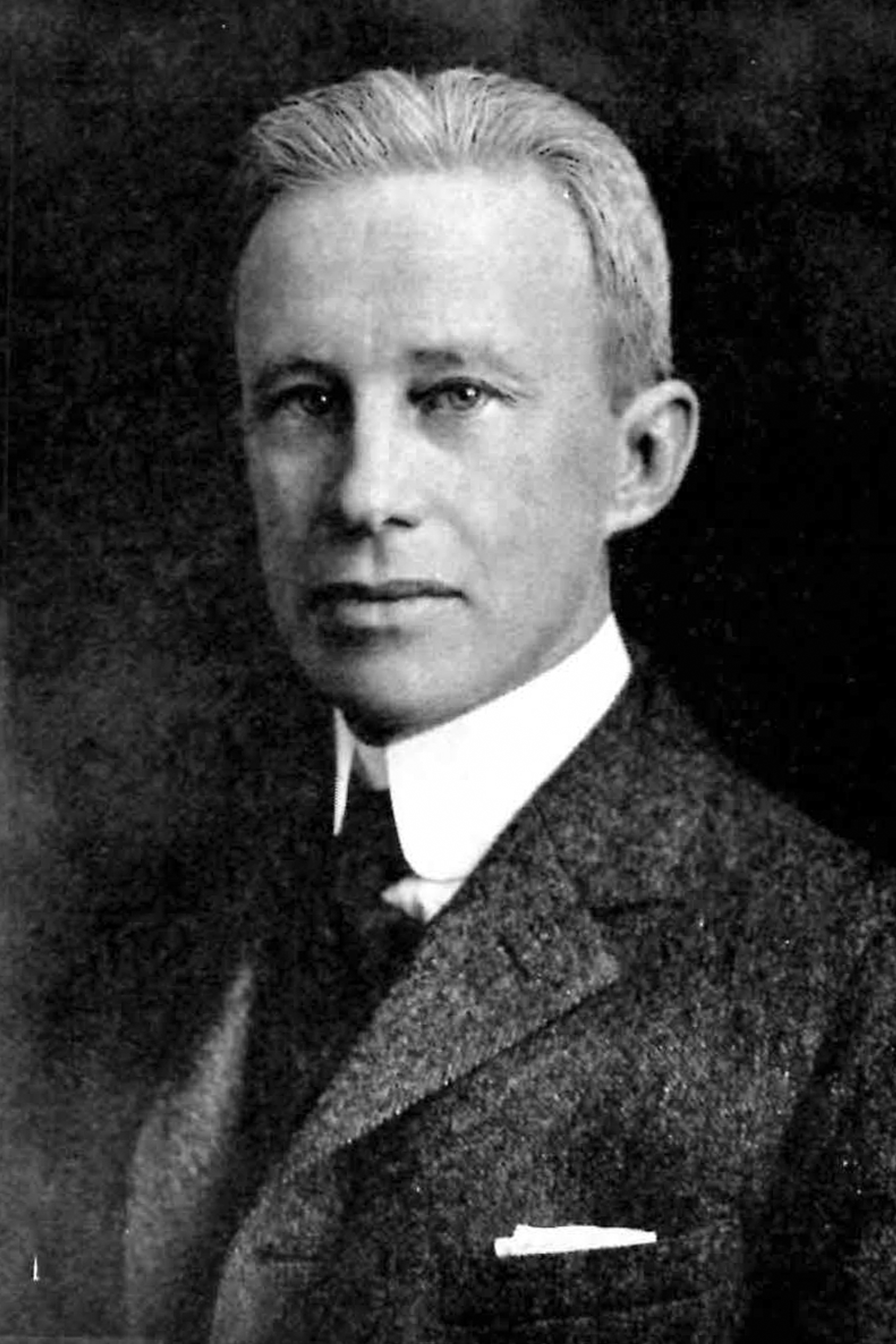
- Born: August 14, 1868; Cambridge, Massachusetts, U.S.
- Died: September 22, 1959 (aged 91); Kittery Point, Maine, U.S.
- Education: Harvard University; École des Beaux-Arts
- Occupation: Architect
- Awards: Legion of Honor; Order of the Crown
- Practice: Howells & Stokes
- Buildings: St. Paul's Chapel; Chicago Tribune; Beekman Tower; Daily News Building

John Mead Howells FAIA (/ˈhaʊəlz/ HOW-əlz; August 14, 1868 – September 22, 1959) was an American architect.

== Early life and education ==
Born in Cambridge, Massachusetts, the son of author William Dean Howells, he earned an undergraduate degree from Harvard University in 1891 and completed further architectural studies there in 1894 before studying at the École des Beaux-Arts, in Paris, where he earned a diploma in 1897.

== Career ==
Howells moved to New York City and founded the architectural firm Howells & Stokes with Isaac Newton Phelps Stokes, who had also studied at Harvard and the École. The partnership designed such works as St. Paul's Chapel at Columbia University and Stormfield, an Italianate villa commissioned by Samuel Clemens, a longtime friend of his father.

Ending the partnership in 1916, Howells would focus his practice on office buildings in the Art Deco style, some of which he completed with Raymond Hood, whom he had met during his time at the École, and whom he had invited to become a partner when he was selected to enter the Chicago Tribune building competition in 1922. These projects include the prize-winning design of the Tribune Tower in Chicago and the American Radiator Building and Daily News Building in New York City. Howells also designed the Beekman Tower in New York and the plan for the University of Brussels in Belgium in 1922 at the request of U.S. Secretary of Commerce Herbert Hoover. Howells's institutional works include the Engineering Quadrangle at Pratt Institute, built in phases from 1909 to 1928; Memorial Hall at Pratt Institute in 1927; and Willoughby Hall at Pratt Institute in 1957.

Howells served as president of the Society of Beaux-Arts Architects and the Society of Architects Diplômes. He was elected to the National Institute of Arts and Letters, named a Chevalier by the French Legion of Honor and an officer of the Order of the Crown (Belgium), and served on the U.S. Commission of Fine Arts from 1933 to 1937. Howells wrote several books on architectural history. In 1944 he was elected into the National Academy of Design as an Associate Academician.

== Gallery ==
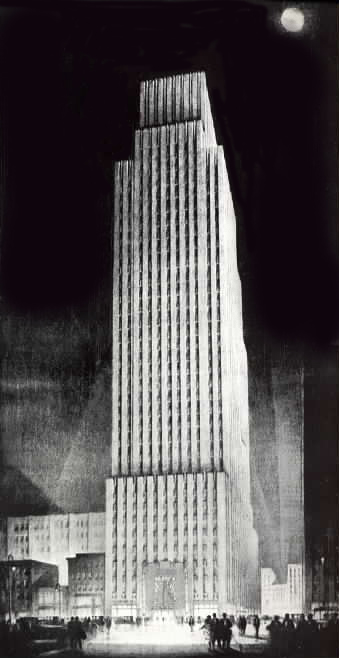
Daily News Building, with Raymond Hood

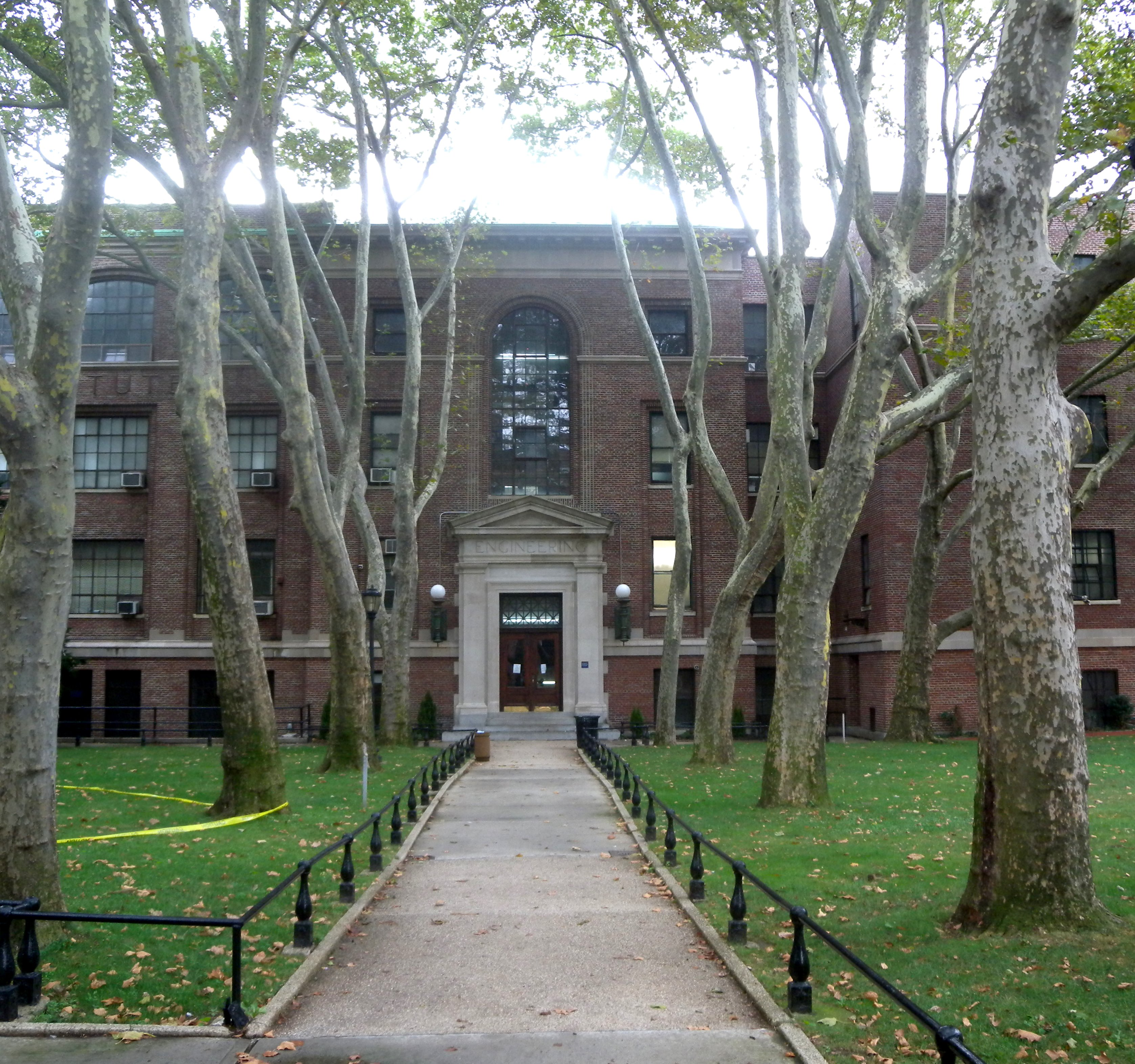
Engineering Quadrangle, Pratt Institute's

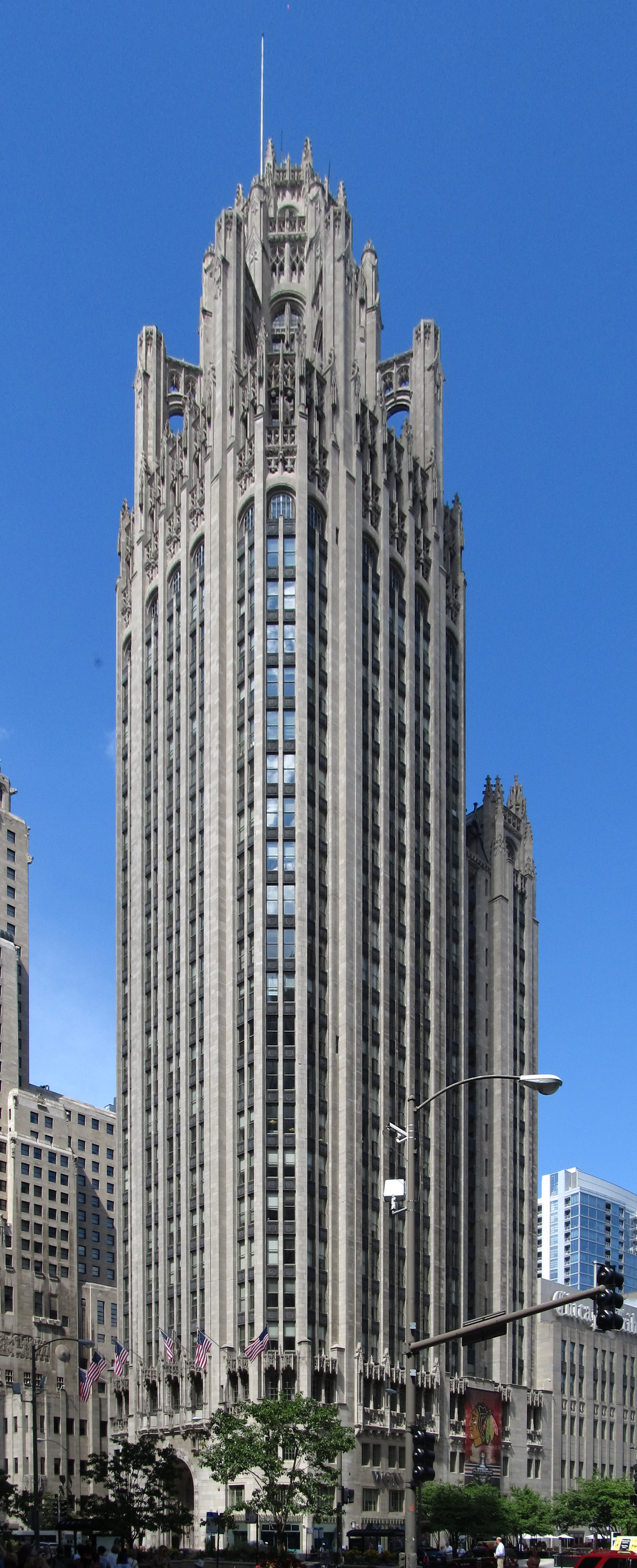
Tribune Tower in Chicago

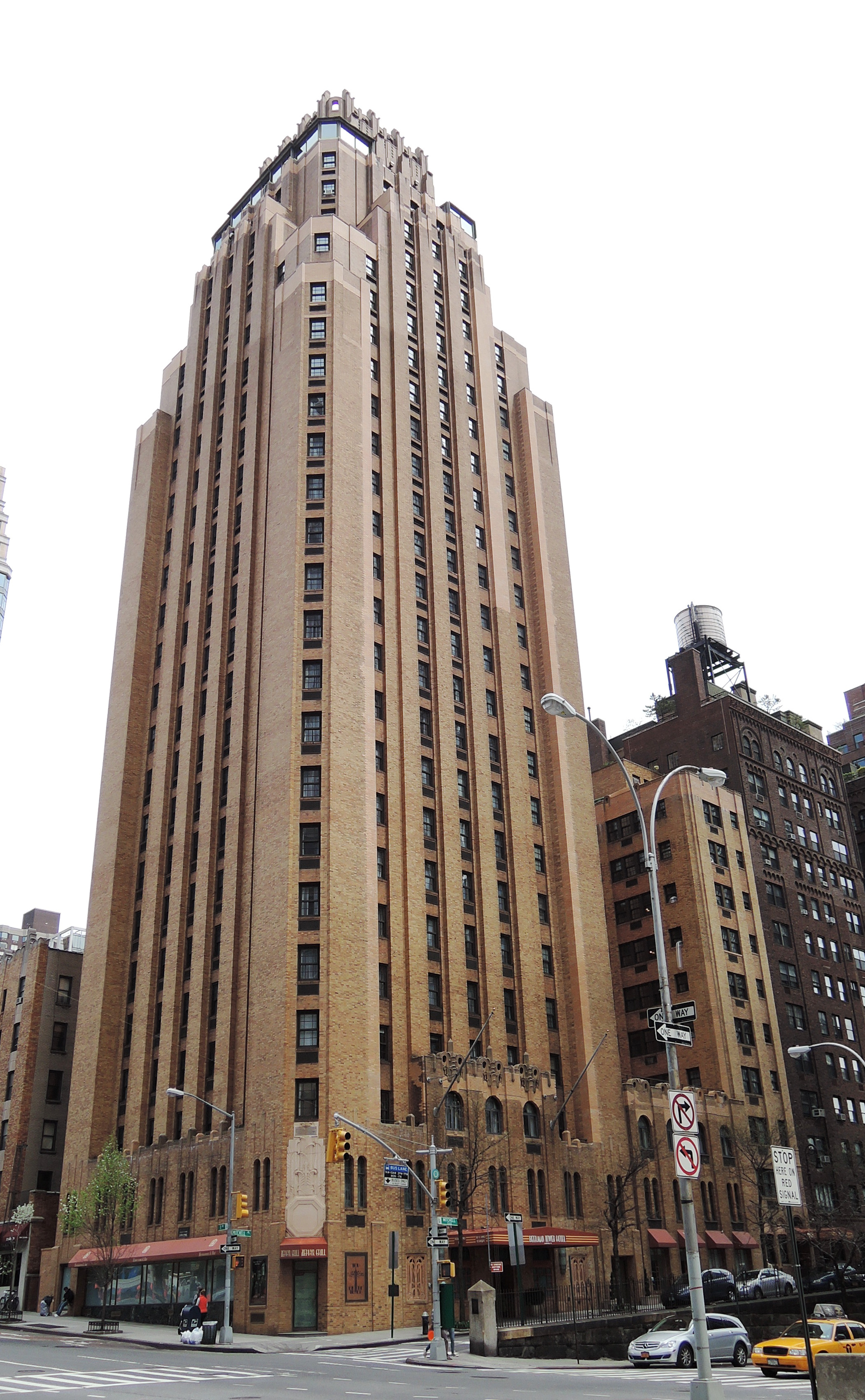
Beekman Tower
