= Tribune Tower =

Skyscraper in Chicago, Illinois

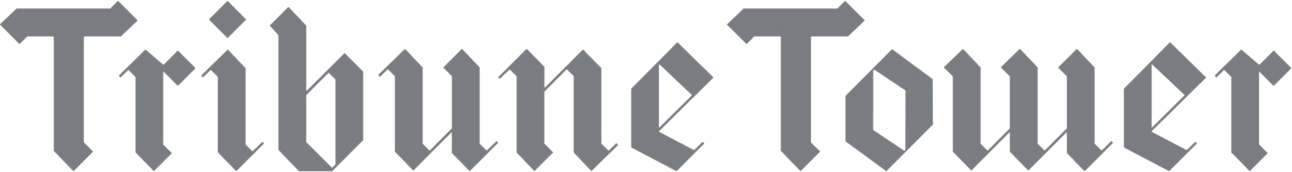

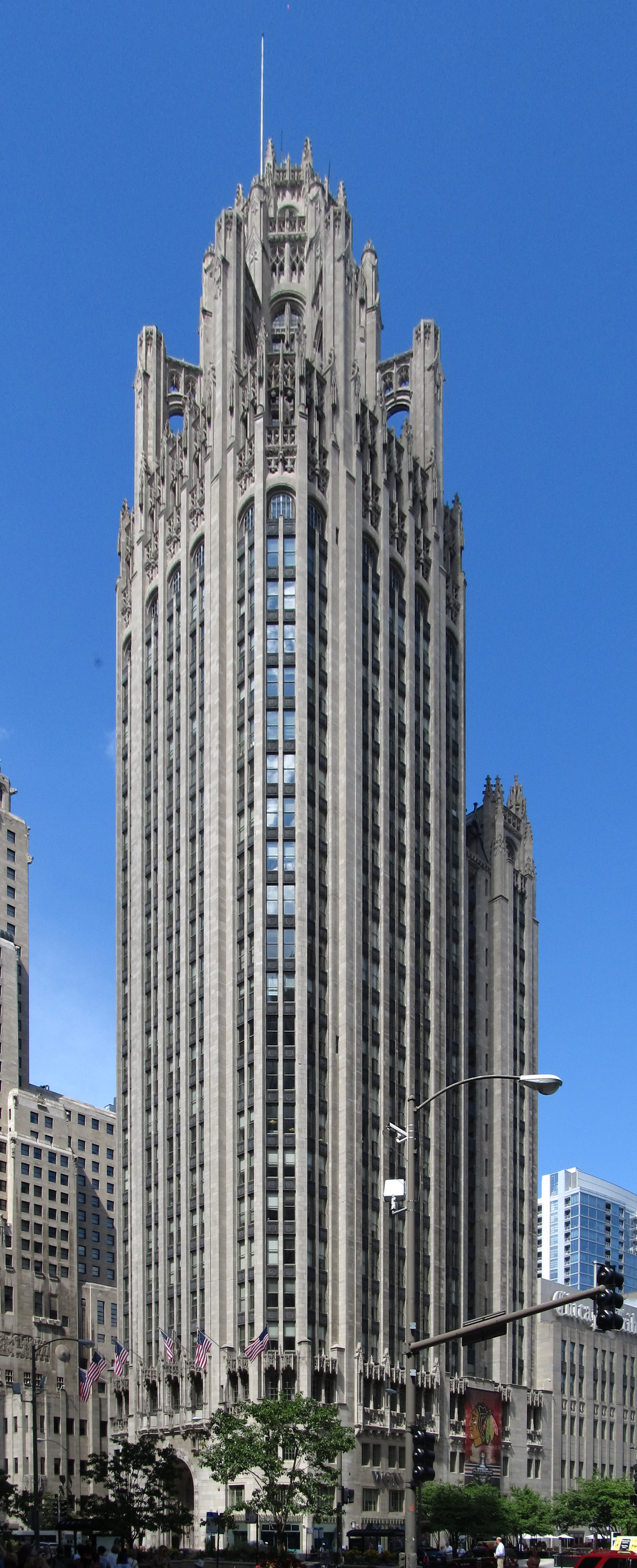
- Tribune Tower in June 2013
- Interactive map of the Tribune Tower area

General information
- Type: Office
- Location: 435 N. Michigan Ave. Chicago, Illinois, United States
- Coordinates: 41.8904°N 87.6237°W
- Construction started: 1923
- Completed: 1925; 101 years ago

Height
- Antenna spire: 496 feet (151 m)
- Roof: 463 feet (141 m)
- Top floor: 428 feet (130 m)

Technical details
- Floor count: 36

Design and construction
- Architects: John Mead Howells and Raymond Hood

Website
- tribunetower.com

Chicago Landmark
- Designated: February 1, 1989

The Tribune Tower is a 463-foot-tall (141 m), 36-floor neo-Gothic skyscraper located at 435 North Michigan Avenue in Chicago, Illinois, United States. The early 1920s international design competition for the tower became an historic event in 20th-century architecture. Built for Chicago Tribune owner Robert R. McCormick, since 2018 it has been converted into luxury residences and in 2023 won a Driehaus Prize for architectural preservation and adaptive reuse from Landmarks Illinois.

The tower was the home of the Tribune and the related Tribune Media, Tribune Broadcasting, and Tribune Publishing. WGN Radio (720 kHz) originated broadcasts from the building until June 18, 2018. CNN's Chicago bureau was also located in the building. It is listed as a Chicago Landmark and is a contributing property to the Michigan–Wacker Historic District. One of its predecessors, the first "Tribune Tower", had been built in 1868 and was destroyed in the Great Chicago Fire of 1871.

== History ==
=== Design competition ===
In 1922 the Chicago Tribune hosted an international interior and exterior design competition for its new headquarters to mark its 75th anniversary, and offered $100,000 (Note: equivalent to $1,923,459 in 2025) in prize money with a $50,000 (Note: equivalent to $961,730 in 2025) first prize for "the most beautiful and distinctive office building in the world". The competition worked brilliantly for months as a publicity stunt, and the resulting entries still reveal a unique turning point in American architectural history. More than 260 entries were received.

The winner was a neo-Gothic design by New York architects John Mead Howells and Raymond Hood, with buttresses near the top.

The entry that many perceived as the best, by the Finnish architect Eliel Saarinen, took second place and received $20,000. (Note: equivalent to $384,692 in 2025) Saarinen's tower was preferred by architects like Louis Sullivan, and was a strong influence on the next generation of skyscrapers, including Raymond Hood's own subsequent work on the McGraw-Hill Building and the Rockefeller Center. The 1929 Gulf Building in Houston, Texas, designed by architects Alfred C. Finn, Kenneth Franzheim, and J. E. R. Carpenter, is a close realization of that Saarinen design. César Pelli's 181 West Madison Street Building in Chicago is also thought to be inspired by Saarinen's design.

Other Tribune tower entries by figures like Walter Gropius, Bertram Goodhue, Walter Burley Griffin, Bruno Taut, and Adolf Loos remain intriguing suggestions of what might have been, but perhaps not as intriguing as the one surmounted by a Mount Rushmore-like head of an American Indian. These entries were originally published by the Tribune Company in 1923 under the title Tribune Tower Competition and later in The Chicago Tribune Tower Competition: Skyscraper Design and Cultural Change in the 1920s by Katherine Solomonson, 2001.

In the 1980 book entitled The Tribune Tower Competition published by Rizzoli, authors Robert A. M. Stern, Stanley Tigerman as well as Bruce Abbey and other architects jokingly submitted "late entries" in Volume II of the work.

Archival materials regarding the competition and the building are held by the Ryerson & Burnham Libraries at the Art Institute of Chicago.

=== Post-opening ===
On April 11, 2006, the McCormick Tribune Freedom Museum opened, occupying two stories of the building, including the previous location of high-end gift store Hammacher Schlemmer. The museum closed this location on March 1, 2009, and redirected its efforts to become an online museum.

Tribune Tower has participated in Chicago Architecture Foundation's event Open House Chicago every year, starting in 2011. This annual opportunity allows visitors to tour the interior of the building for free.

The Chicago Tribune, the building's main tenant since it opened, moved out in June 2018, in order for the building to be converted to condos. The conversion of the building was reported to cost more than $500 million. The conversion has run into some legal troubles regarding the sign: the Chicago Tribune contends that the sign is their intellectual property, so it can not remain on the building, but the developers stated that they had a contractual agreement to buy the sign for one dollar. Col. Robert R. McCormick's former iconic office on the 24th floor will be turned into offices. In the former parking lot for Tribune Tower, there are plans to build Tribune East Tower, a super-tall skyscraper that would become the city's second-tallest.

In 2025, the investment firm North American Real Estate bought the Tribune Tower's retail space.

== Architecture ==
By 1922 the neo-Gothic skyscraper had become an established design tactic, with the first important so-called "American Perpendicular Style" at Cass Gilbert's Woolworth Building of 1913. This was a late example, perhaps the last important example, and criticized for its perceived historicism. Construction on the Tribune Tower was completed in 1925 and reached a height of 462 feet (141 m) above ground. The ornate buttresses surrounding the peak of the tower are especially visible when the tower is lit at night.

As was the case with most of Hood's projects, the sculptures and decorations were made by the American artist Rene Paul Chambellan. The tower features carved images of Robin Hood (Hood) and a howling dog (Howells) near the main entrance to commemorate the architects. The top of the tower is designed after the Tour de beurre (″butter tower″) of the Rouen Cathedral in France, which is characteristic of the Late-Gothic style, that is to say, without a spire but with a crown-shaped top.

Rene Paul Chambellan contributed his sculpture talents to the buildings ornamentation, gargoyles and the Aesops' Screen over the main entrance doors. Rene Chambellan worked on other projects with Raymond Hood including the American Radiator Building and Rockefeller Center in New York City. Also, among the gargoyles on the Tribune Tower is one of a frog. That piece was created by Rene Chambellan to represent himself jokingly as he is of French ancestry.

The building's lobby also serves as a hall of inscriptions, with quotations about liberty and the freedom of the press taken from the work of Benjamin Franklin, James Madison, Euripides, Voltaire, Daniel Webster, and others, carved into the walls. This includes Thomas Jefferson's “Our liberty depends on the freedom of the press, and that can not be limited without being lost.”

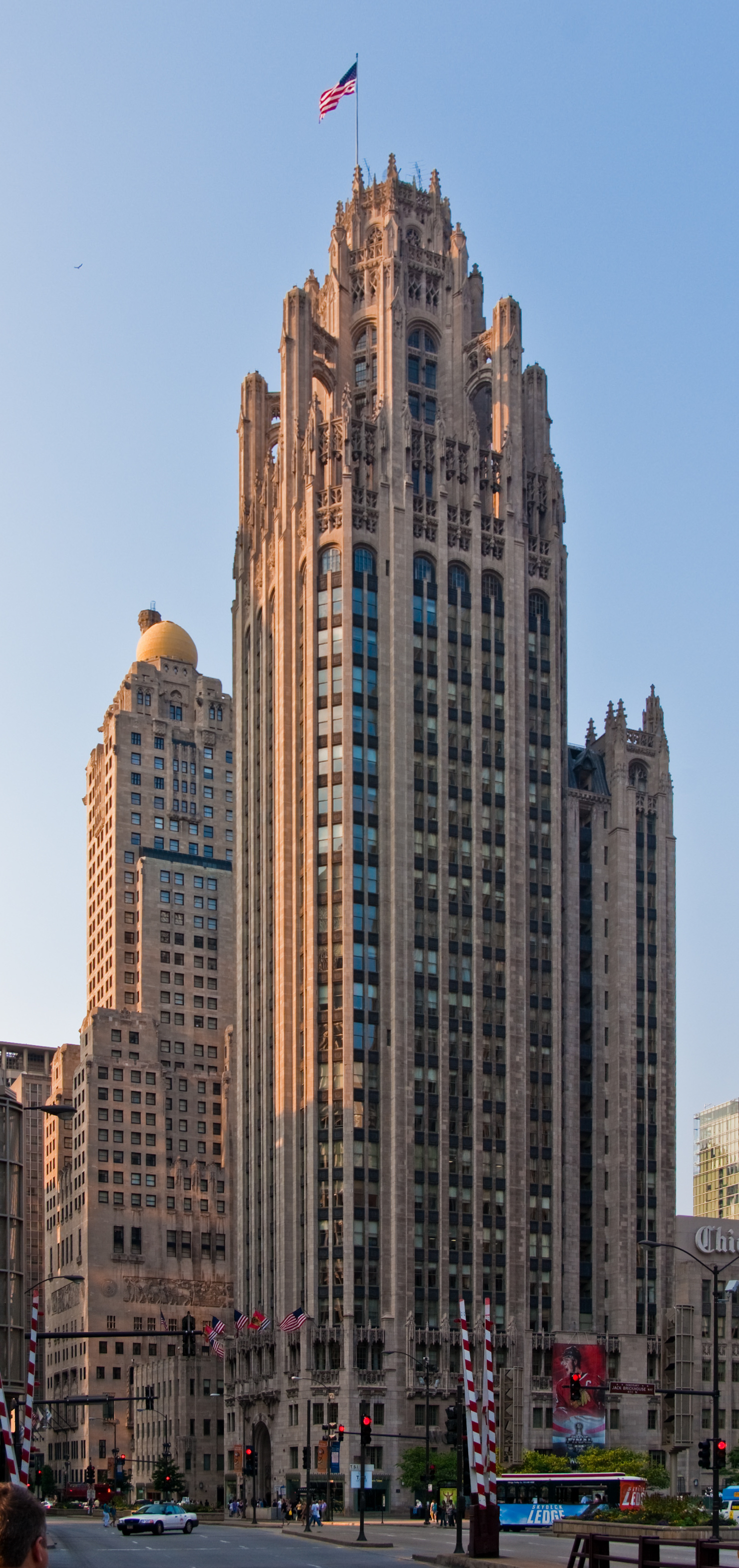
Tribune Tower in 2009

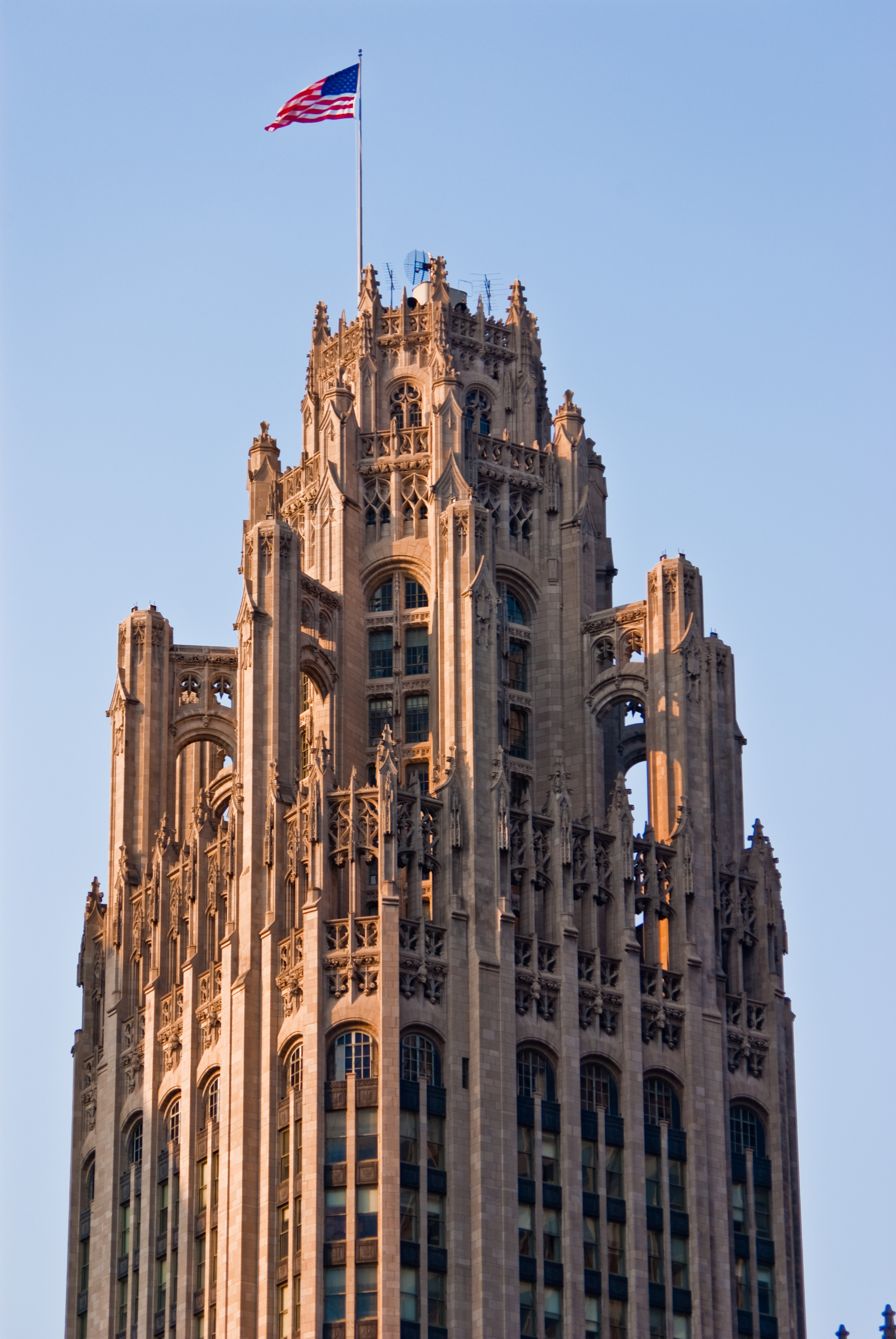
Buttresses on the top of the building

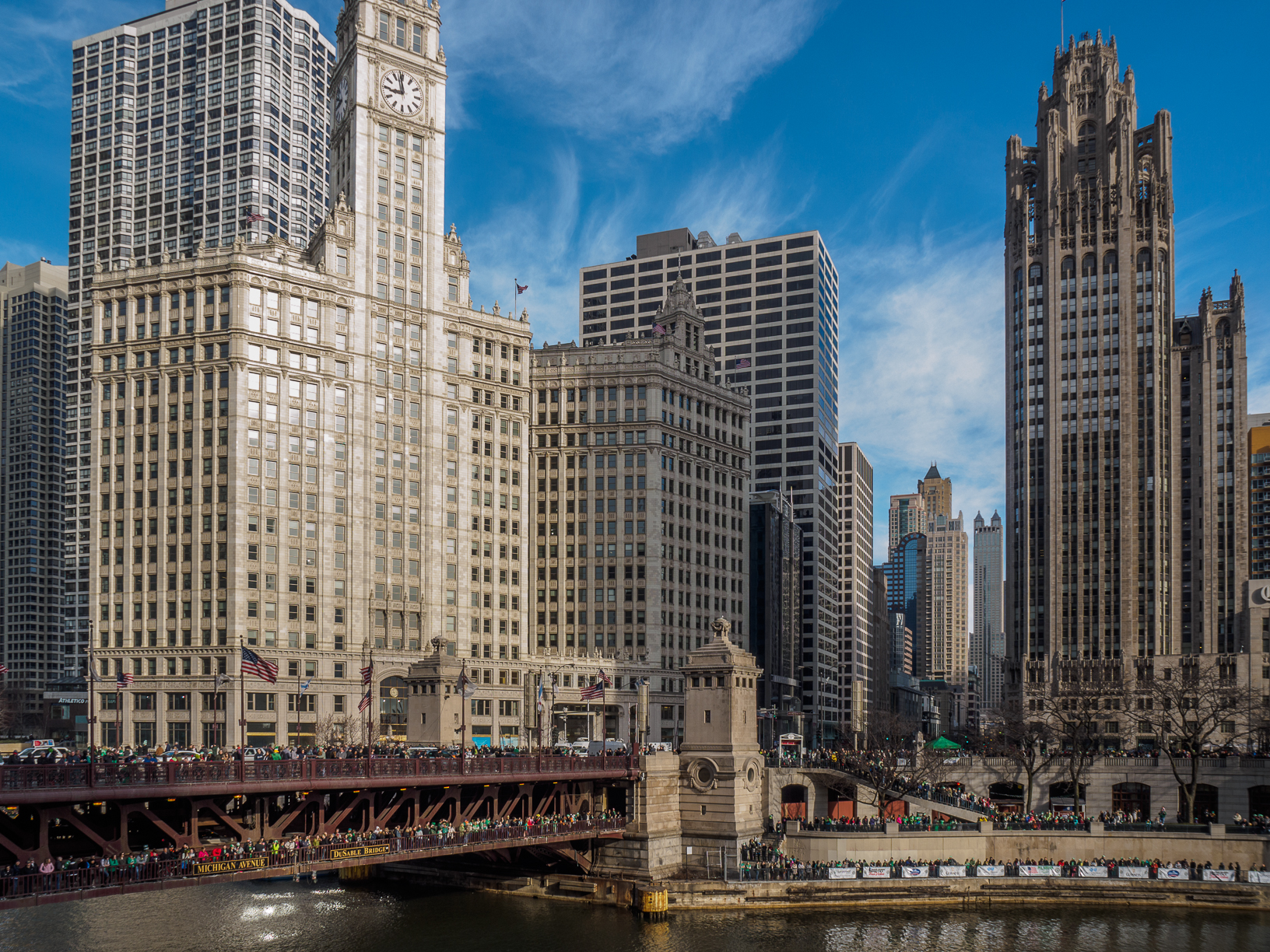
The Tribune Tower (right) above the Chicago River

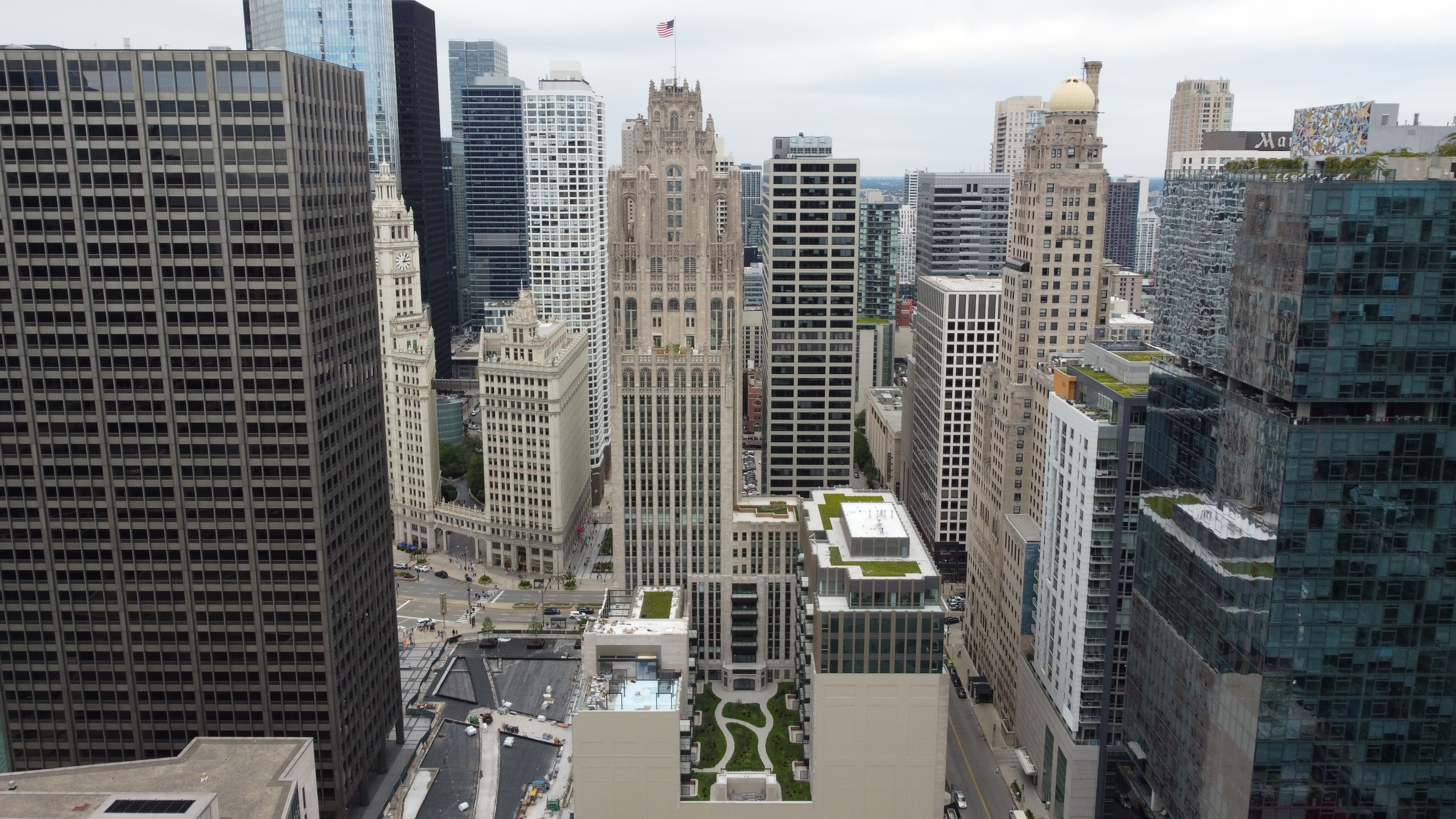
Tribune Tower in July 2021, with noticeable additions on part of the condo conversion

=== Collection of famous building fragments ===
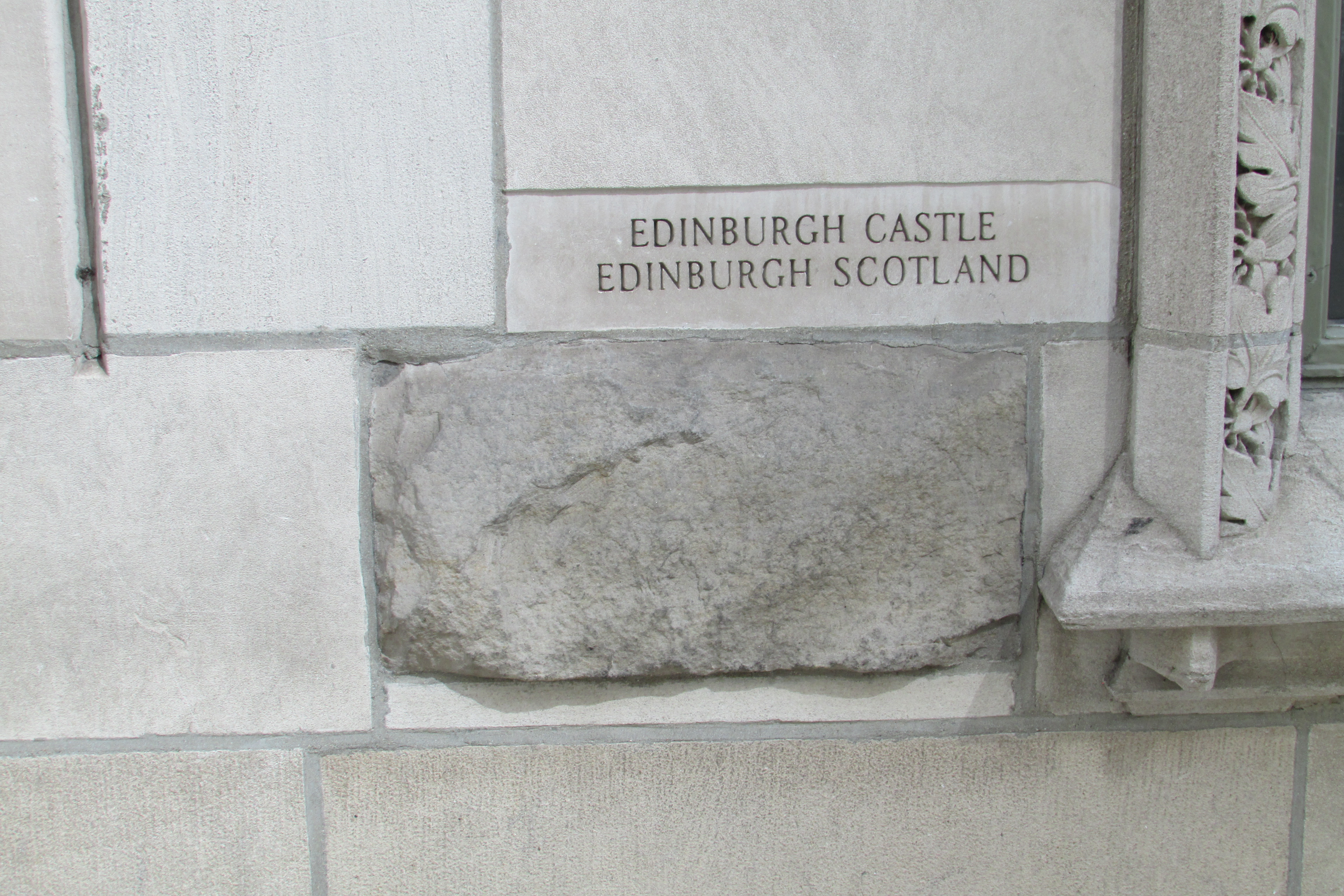
Fragment of Edinburgh Castle built into the tower

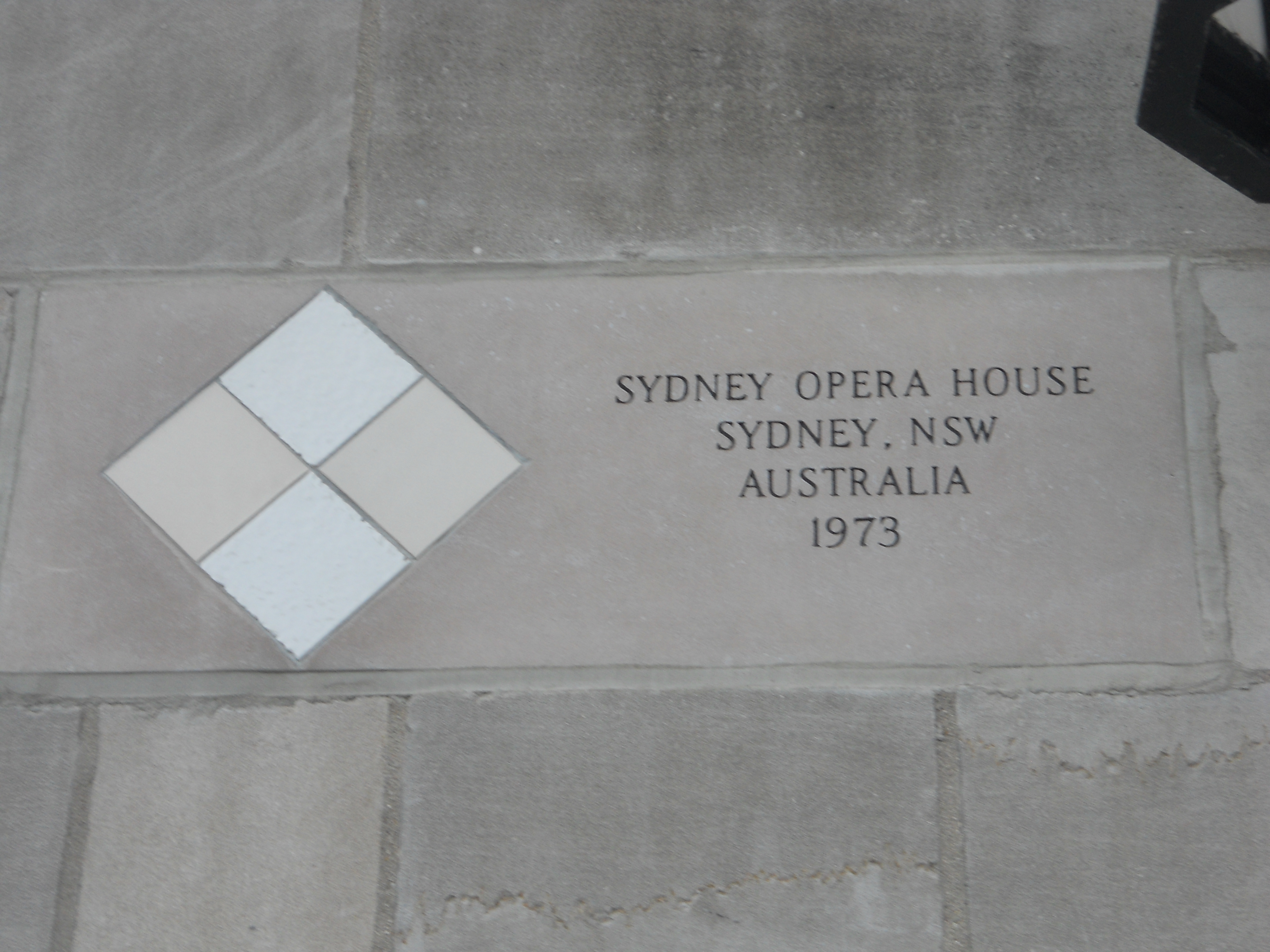
Tiles from the Sydney Opera House embedded in the facade

Prior to the building of the Tribune Tower, correspondents for the Chicago Tribune had brought back rocks and bricks from a variety of historically important sites throughout the world at the request of Colonel McCormick. Many of these fragments have been incorporated into the lowest levels of the building and are labeled with their location of origin. Stones included in the wall are from such sites as the St. Stephen's Cathedral, Trondheim Cathedral, Taj Mahal, Clementine Hall, the Parthenon, Hagia Sophia, Süleymaniye Mosque, Corregidor Island, Palace of Westminster, petrified wood from the Redwood National and State Parks, the Great Pyramid, The Alamo, Notre-Dame de Paris, Abraham Lincoln's Tomb, the Great Wall of China, Independence Hall, Fort Santiago, Angkor Wat, Ta Prohm, Wawel Castle, Banteay Srei, and Rouen Cathedral's Butter Tower, which inspired the shape of the building.

In 1999, during a celebration of the 30th anniversary of the Apollo 11 mission, Buzz Aldrin presented a rock brought from the Moon, which was displayed in a window in the Tribune gift store. It could not be added to the wall, as NASA owns a large majority of the Apollo Moon rocks, and this one was merely on loan to the Tribune. The rock was removed in 2011 due to an outdated display. A new rock display is planned but has not been installed as of 2018. A piece of steel recovered from the World Trade Center was added to the wall. Tiles from the Sydney Opera House were added in 2006.

=== Plaza ===
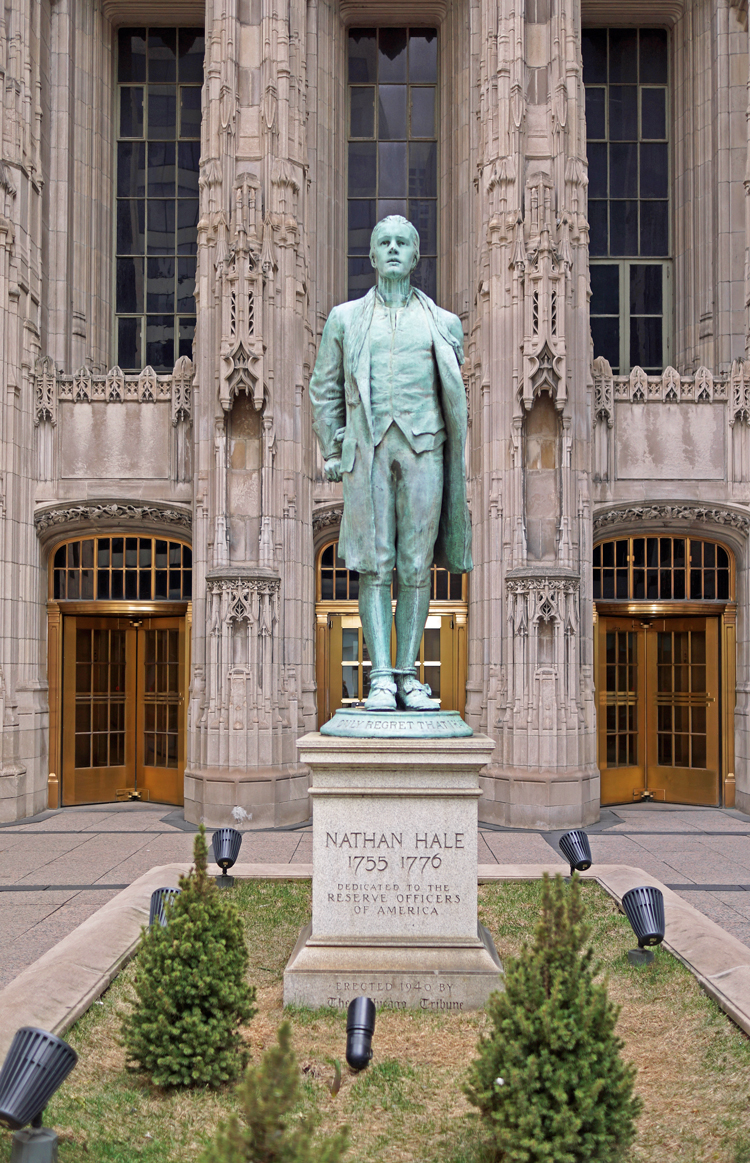
The statue of Nathan Hale by Bela Pratt in 2013

The building's plaza has a bronze sculpture by Bela Pratt depicting Nathan Hale, commissioned by McCormick in 1940. It is a replica of one commissioned by Yale University in 1899; Pratt's widow gave permission for the copy. The statue was dedicated on June 4, 1940, with an event that included musical performances and an address by Professor William Warren Sweet, attended by high school Reserve Officers' Training Corps members. It depicts Hale with wrists and ankles bound. The pedestal states that it is "Dedicated to the reserve officers of America" and the statue's base has Hale's famous quote "I only regret that I have but one life to lose for my country."

== Impact ==
=== Buildings influenced by the Tower ===
Several buildings around the world make reference to the design of the Tribune Tower, most notably in Australia: the spires of the Grace Building in Sydney and the Manchester Unity Building in Melbourne. The Title Guarantee and Trust Building in Los Angeles also took inspiration from Tribune Tower in its design. Additionally, the architects of One Atlantic Center located in the Midtown section of Atlanta were influenced by the building which is most evident in the shaft of the building as well as the base.

=== In popular culture ===
- On November 21 and 28, 2007, in episodes entitled "One Wedding and a Funeral" and "The Thing About Heroes" of the television series CSI: NY, historical pieces stolen from the building led Mac Taylor (Gary Sinise) to his hometown of Chicago. Upon further investigation of the man stalking him, Taylor found a dead body in an office of an unused floor in the building. The episodes were filmed entirely on location in Chicago.
- Conan O'Brien was seen running past the tower while en route from New York to Los Angeles on his first episode as host of The Tonight Show.
- The snipers in the 2011 film Transformers: Dark of the Moon are shooting from the 26th floor of the Tribune Tower just below the buttresses.

== See also ==
- Chicago architecture
- Open House Chicago
