= Bear Creek Township, Christian County, Illinois =

Bear Creek Township
- Township
- Township of Bear Creek
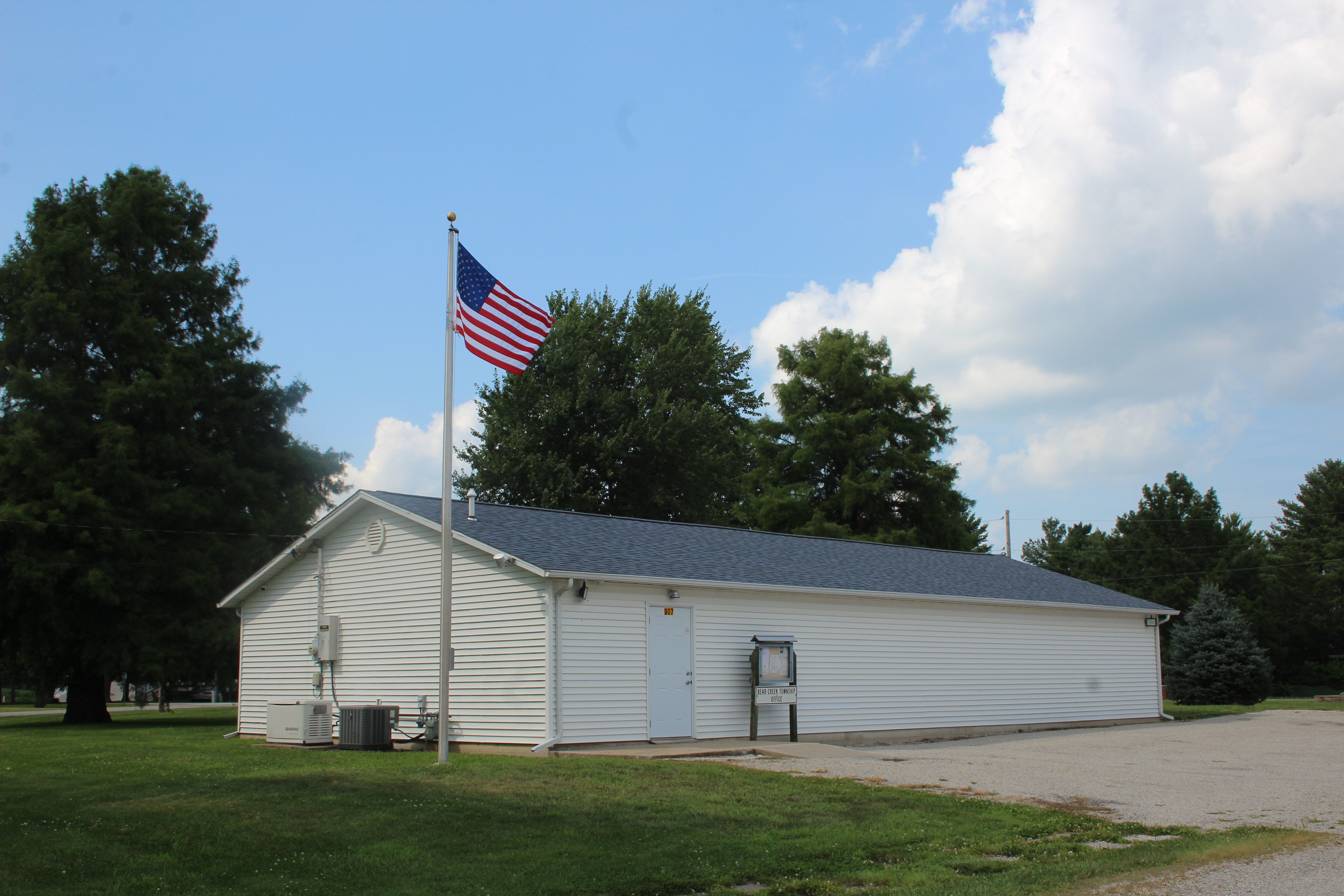
- Township government building in Palmer

- Location in Christian County

- Christian County's location in Illinois
- Coordinates: 39°28′42″N 89°24′58″W
- Country: United States
- State: Illinois
- County: Christian
- Established: November 7, 1865

Area
  - Total: 35.83 sq mi (92.8 km^{2})
  - Land: 35.82 sq mi (92.8 km^{2})
  - Water: 0.01 sq mi (0.026 km^{2}) 0.03%
- Elevation: 607 ft (185 m)

Population (2020)
  - Total: 516
  - Density: 14.4/sq mi (5.56/km^{2})
- Time zone: UTC-6 (CST)
  - Summer (DST): UTC-5 (CDT)
- ZIP Codes: 62546, 62556, 62568
- Area codes: 217, 447
- FIPS code: 17-021-04325

Bear Creek Township is one of seventeen townships in Christian County, Illinois, United States. At the time of the 2020 census, its population was 516, and it contained 227 housing units.

== Geography ==
According to the 2010 census, the township has a total area of 35.83 square miles (92.8 km^{2}), of which 35.82 square miles (92.8 km^{2}) – or 99.97% – is land and 0.01 square miles (0.026 km^{2}) – or 0.03% – is water.

=== Cities, towns, villages ===
- Palmer

=== Unincorporated towns ===
- Clarksdale

=== Cemeteries ===
The township contains these three cemeteries: Anderson, Durbin, and Palmer.

=== Major highways ===
- Illinois Route 48

== Demographics ==
Historical population
Census	Pop.	Note	%±
1870	590		—
1880	706		19.7%
1890	1,321		87.1%
1900	1,239		−6.2%
1910	1,243		0.3%
1920	973		−21.7%
1930	885		−9.0%
1940	906		2.4%
1950	931		2.8%
1960	781		−16.1%
1970	679		−13.1%
1980	675		−0.6%
1990	607		−10.1%
2000	575		−5.3%
2010	499		−13.2%
2020	516		3.4%
U.S. Decennial Census

As of the 2020 census there were 516 people, 222 households, and 177 families residing in the township. The population density was 14.40 inhabitants per square mile (5.56/km^{2}). There were 227 housing units at an average density of 6.33 per square mile (2.44/km^{2}). The racial makeup of the township was 94.19% White, 0.19% African American, 0.58% Native American, 0.00% Asian, 0.00% Pacific Islander, 0.58% from other races, and 4.46% from two or more races. Hispanic or Latino of any race were 0.39% of the population.

There were 222 households, out of which 28.80% had children under the age of 18 living with them, 59.01% were married couples living together, 13.51% had a female householder with no spouse present, and 20.27% were non-families. 16.70% of all households were made up of individuals, and 11.30% had someone living alone who was 65 years of age or older. The average household size was 2.29 and the average family size was 2.54.

The township's age distribution consisted of 18.1% under the age of 18, 8.1% from 18 to 24, 19.6% from 25 to 44, 34.1% from 45 to 64, and 20.0% who were 65 years of age or older. The median age was 46.9 years. For every 100 females, there were 91.4 males. For every 100 females age 18 and over, there were 100.5 males.

The median income for a household in the township was $71,250, and the median income for a family was $85,125. Males had a median income of $41,818 versus $37,857 for females. The per capita income for the township was $38,095. About 2.8% of families and 4.5% of the population were below the poverty line, including 4.3% of those under age 18 and 1.0% of those age 65 or over.

== School districts ==
- Morrisonville Community Unit School District 1
- Taylorville Community Unit School District 3

== Political districts ==
- State House District 98
- State Senate District 49

== Notable person ==
- James B. Ricks – Lawyer who served as the mayor of Taylorville and as a justice on the Illinois State Supreme Court; born in Bear Creek Township in 1852.
