= Senator Forrester =

Senator Forrester may refer to:

- James H. Forrester (1870–1928), Illinois State Senate
- James Forrester (politician) (1937–2011), North Carolina State Senate
- Jeanie Forrester (born 1958), New Hampshire State Senate

== See also ==
- George H. Forster (1838–1888), New York State Senate
