= Frederick Godley =

American architect and educator (1886–1961)

- Born: Frederick Augustus Godley; June 10, 1886; Jersey City, New Jersey, U.S.
- Died: February 21, 1961 (aged 74); Scottsdale, Arizona, U.S.
- Education: Hotchkiss School; Yale University; MIT; École des Beaux-Arts
- Occupation: Architect
- Spouse: Anne Franchot Godley
- Children: 3
- Buildings: McGraw Hill Building, DuPont Building Rockefeller Center, Daily News Building, Chanticlare

Frederick Augustus Godley (June 10, 1886 – February 21, 1961) was an American architect and Yale educator who worked in the Neo-Gothic and Art Deco styles. He is best known for his designs of the McGraw Hill Building, the DuPont Building, Chanticlare, the Daily News Building, and Rockefeller Center.

== Life and career ==
Frederick Godley was born in Jersey City, New Jersey, on June 10, 1886. He attended the Hotchkiss School in Lakeville, Connecticut. For college, he earned his Bachelor's degrees from Yale University and MIT, and then attended the École des Beaux-Arts in Paris.

Godley began his architectural career in 1913, with Guy Lowell. He eventually worked in the architectural firms of Godley & Haskell (1915–18), Godley & Sedgwick (1918–24), and Hood, Godley, & Fouilhoux (1924–29).

In the mid-1920s, Godley designed the Chanticlare estate for Union Carbide executive Jesse Ricks, located in Flower Hill, New York; the main mansion consisted of 42 rooms. He was also a member of the American Institute of Architects from 1920, and became a fellow of the AIA in 1935.

Godley was also an educator at Yale University (of which he was an alum) in New Haven, Connecticut, where he was employed as a professor of architecture. He also was the Master of the university's Timothy Dwight College.

Godley died on February 21, 1961, in Scottsdale, Arizona, on a vacation with his wife, Anne.

== Personal life ==
Godley was married to his wife, Anne Franchot. They had three children (two sons and one daughter) and eight grandchildren.

Frederick Godley was a resident of Rye, New York, for over two decades and served on the town's planning and zoning boards. He was also the President of the Rye Presbyterian Church's Board of Trustees.

== Notable works ==
- McGraw Hill Building – New York City
- Chanticlare – Flower Hill, New York
- Rockefeller Center – New York City
- DuPont Building – Wilmington, Delaware

== See also ==
- Raymond Hood
