= James Forrester =

James Forrester may refer to:

- James Forrester (writer) (born 1967), historical fiction pen name for Ian Mortimer
- James Forrester (politician) (1937–2011), American politician from North Carolina
- James H. Forrester (1870–1928), American lawyer, judge, and politician from Illinois
- James J. Forrester (1867–1939), American labor union leader
- James Forrester (rugby union) (born 1981), rugby union player
- James Forrester (basketball) (born 1989), Filipino-Canadian basketball player
- James S. Forrester (cardiologist) (born 1937), American cardiologist

== See also ==
- Jamie Forrester (born 1974), footballer
