= 330 West 42nd Street =

Skyscraper in Manhattan, New York

- McGraw-Hill Building
- U.S. National Register of Historic Places
- U.S. National Historic Landmark
- New York State Register of Historic Places
- New York City Landmark
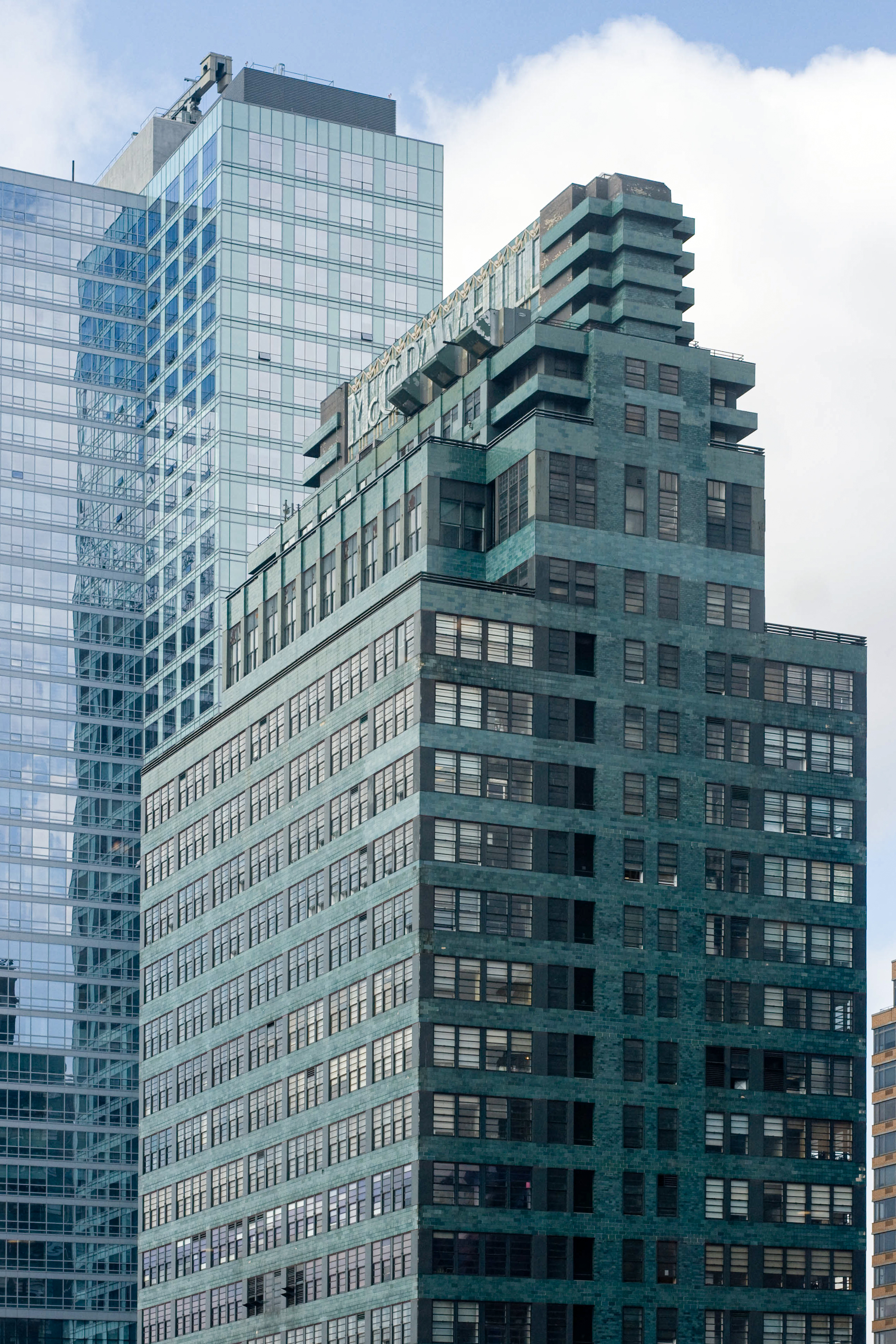
- Interactive map of McGraw-Hill Building
- Location: 330 West 42nd Street; Manhattan, New York
- Coordinates: 40°45′27″N 73°59′30″W
- Area: 27,975 square feet (2,599.0 m^{2})
- Built: 1930–1931
- Architects: Raymond Hood, Frederick Godley, and J. André Fouilhoux
- Architectural style: International Style, Art Deco, Art Moderne
- NRHP reference No.: 80002701
- NYSRHP No.: 06101.000625
- NYCL No.: 1050

Significant dates
- Added to NRHP: March 28, 1980
- Designated NHL: June 29, 1989
- Designated NYSRHP: June 23, 1980
- Designated NYCL: September 11, 1979

330 West 42nd Street (also known as the McGraw-Hill Building and formerly as the GHI Building) is a 485-foot-tall (148 m), 33-story skyscraper in the Hell's Kitchen neighborhood of Manhattan in New York City, New York, U.S. Designed by Raymond Hood and J. André Fouilhoux in a mixture of the International Style, Art Deco, and Art Moderne styles, the building was constructed from 1930 to 1931 and originally served as the headquarters of the McGraw-Hill Companies.

The building's massing, or shape, consists of numerous setbacks facing 41st and 42nd streets; these were included to comply with the 1916 Zoning Resolution. The facade is made of blue-green terracotta ceramic tile panels alternating with green metal-framed windows, with a strongly horizontal orientation. The facade was intended to blend in with the sky regardless of the atmospheric conditions. The entrance and the original lobby were decorated with light blue and dark green panels. Most of the upper stories had similar floor plans, except for their widths, which varied due to the setbacks on the facade. At the time of its completion, 330 West 42nd Street was controversial for the use of horizontal emphasis on its facade, which its contemporaries lacked. Retrospectively, the building became known as an early example of the International Style.

McGraw-Hill Companies bought the land in early 1930 to replace smaller headquarters; the company originally took three-quarters of the space, renting out the other stories. As the surrounding neighborhood became more decrepit, McGraw-Hill moved in 1972 to 1221 Avenue of the Americas. The building subsequently became the headquarters of Group Health Insurance (GHI). Since then, ownership of 330 West 42nd Street has changed several times. Deco Towers, which has owned the building since 1994, began considering converting it into condominiums in 2018. Moed de Armas and Shannon completely renovated the building (including the lobby) in 2021, and the upper stories were converted into apartments starting in 2023. The New York City Landmarks Preservation Commission (LPC) has designated 330 West 42nd Street as a city landmark, and the structure is listed on the National Register of Historic Places (NRHP) as a National Historic Landmark.

== Site ==
330 West 42nd Street is on the south side of 42nd Street, between Eighth and Ninth avenues, in the Hell's Kitchen neighborhood of Manhattan in New York City. The land lot has an area of 27,975 square feet (2,600 m^{2}; 0.64 acres) and a frontage of 130 feet (40 m) on 42nd Street, extending 197.5 feet (60.2 m) deep. It is on the same city block as The Orion to the west and part of the Port Authority Bus Terminal to the east; the building is also across from Holy Cross Church in the north and the remainder of the bus terminal to the south. The New York City Subway's 42nd Street–Port Authority Bus Terminal station and Eleven Times Square are on Eighth Avenue, less than one block east.

In the late 1920s, the surrounding area had low-rise residences. The building's site was occupied by five tenements of four to five stories on 42nd Street and six tenements of four stories on 41st Street. On the same city block, John A. Larkin acquired several lots totaling 47,500 square feet (4,410 m^{2}) in 1926. Larkin had wanted to erect the Larkin Tower, or Larkin Building, a 110-story, 1,208-foot-tall (368 m) office skyscraper clad mainly in stone and steel, which would have been the world's tallest building. The floor area of the Larkin Tower's upper stories would have been so small as to make the building economically infeasible. Critics also disapproved of what was then an extreme height, leading to its cancellation in 1930. Part of the site then became the present 330 West 42nd Street. Many of the surrounding tenements had been converted into office buildings by the 1930s.

== Architecture ==
The McGraw-Hill Building at 330 West 42nd Street was designed by Raymond Hood, Frederick Godley, and J. André Fouilhoux of the firm Hood, Godley, and Fouilhoux. The building has a mixture of International Style, Art Deco, and Art Moderne decorative elements. It was completed in 1931 as the headquarters of publisher McGraw-Hill Companies. The skyscraper measures 485 feet (148 m) tall, with 33 stories. (Note: The official height is 33 stories, according to Emporis and the New York City Department of City Planning. However, the New York City Landmarks Preservation Commission and The New York Times give a height of 35 stories, including the penthouse. Eric P. Nash also gives a height of 35 stories, with a height of 480 feet (150 m).) The design of 330 West 42nd Street was evocative of those of New York City's earlier factory buildings. As Architectural Forum magazine said: "The requirements peculiar to a publishing business have formed the basis for the entire structure—in plan, section, and elevation." In an issue of the McGraw-Hill News in 1931, Hood wrote that "Economy and good working conditions were the three factors uppermost in mind" during the building's planning.

=== Form ===
The structure rises 35 stories, with setbacks to comply with the 1916 Zoning Resolution. The massing of the building contains setbacks at the 11th and 16th floors on both 41st and 42nd streets, as well as at the 7th floor on 41st Street. Each of these setbacks is only one bay deep. On the 32nd and 34th floors, the building contains additional setbacks.

Because the setbacks are only placed on the northern and southern elevations of the facade, they are only visible from the west and east. The northern and southern elevations appear to be a slab when viewed head-on. Both elevations are seven bays wide on all stories. Under the 1916 Zoning Resolution, setbacks were not required on the facades that abutted other land lots. The lack of setbacks on the western and eastern elevations made the building stand out as an industrial structure, even in the low-rise Hell's Kitchen neighborhood. Architectural writer Eric P. Nash likened the massing to an ocean liner.

=== Facade ===
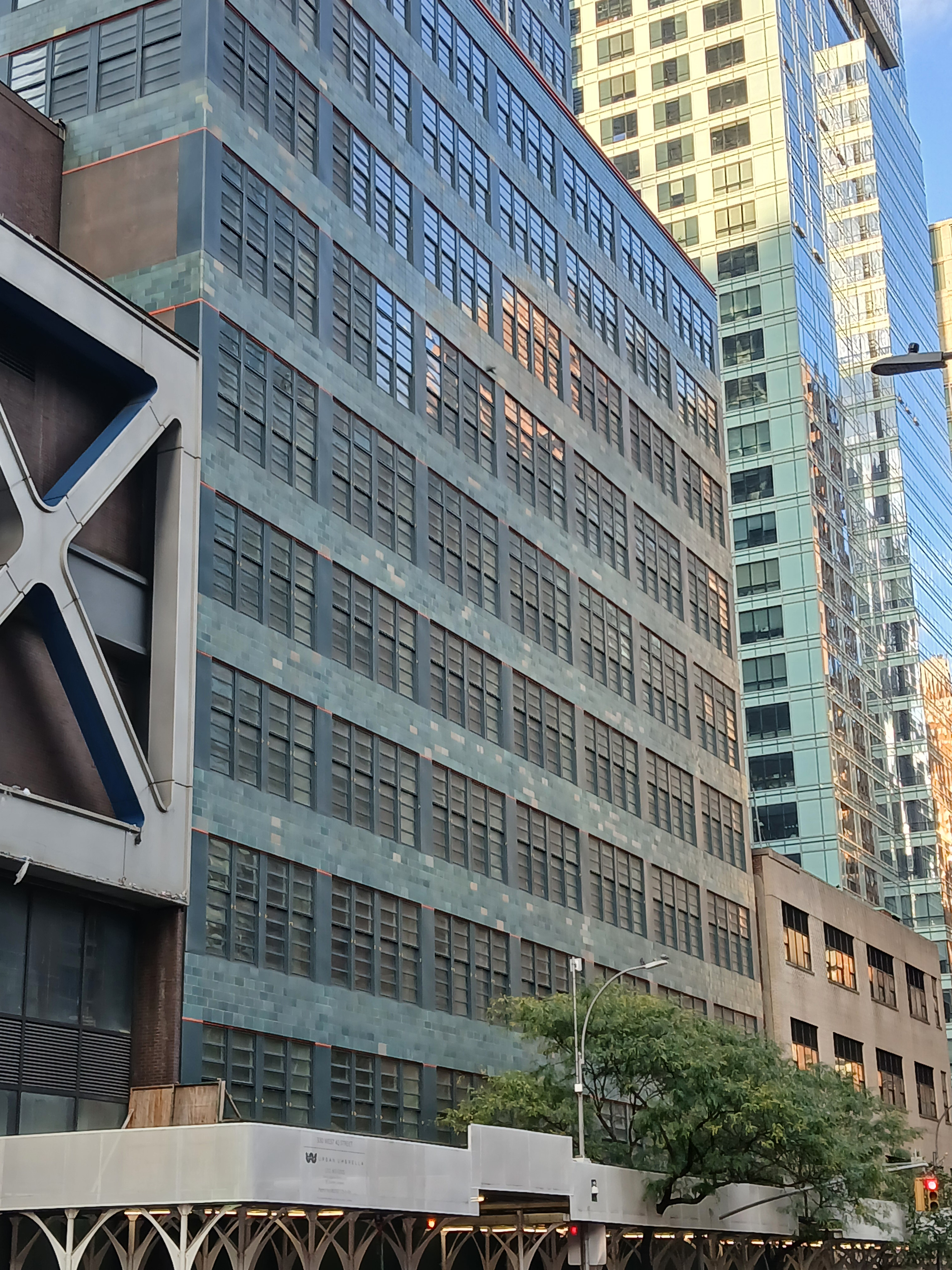
The base as seen in 2024

The building was largely designed with a plain facade; the original ground level and the topmost stories are more elaborately decorated than the middle stories. Unlike Art Deco structures of the past, 330 West 42nd Street relied on color as a primary means of ornament. At the time of the building's construction, Hood had predicted that the future skyline of New York City would "consist of gaily colored buildings", though this did not come true until postmodern architecture became popular later in the 20th century.

==== Base ====
At ground level on 42nd Street, the building contains what were originally a pair of three-bay-wide glass storefronts, which were initially used by McGraw-Hill's bookstore and a bank. These curve inward to become the walls of the central entrance doorway with five doors recessed within the facade. The curved walls between the storefront and the recessed entrance contain gold- and silver-colored metal bands, alternating with dark-green and light-blue panels. The company newspaper McGraw-Hill News characterized the bands as "lacquered like the body of a motor car". Above the ground level is a set of light-blue panels with silver-colored metal bands. This entrance originally had Art Deco-style letters with the words mcgraw-hill. Within the doorway were steel doors topped by a glass transom.

==== Shaft ====
The exterior walls of the building are blue-green terracotta ceramic panels alternating with sash windows. Hood chose to use steel and terracotta rather than stone because, in his view, stone and brick tended to darken relatively quickly after a structure's completion. The terracotta was manufactured by the Federal Seaboard Terra Cotta Corporation. The terracotta panels between each story are laid in six glazed courses or layers, which gradually become lighter on higher stories. These panels were designed to give the appearance of shimmering, giving the facade a slightly different tint during different times of day. The terracotta panels were built to the minimum dimensions required by city building codes. At the time of 330 West 42nd Street's construction, terracotta was not commonly used in International Style structures, which frequently contained glass, steel, and concrete instead.

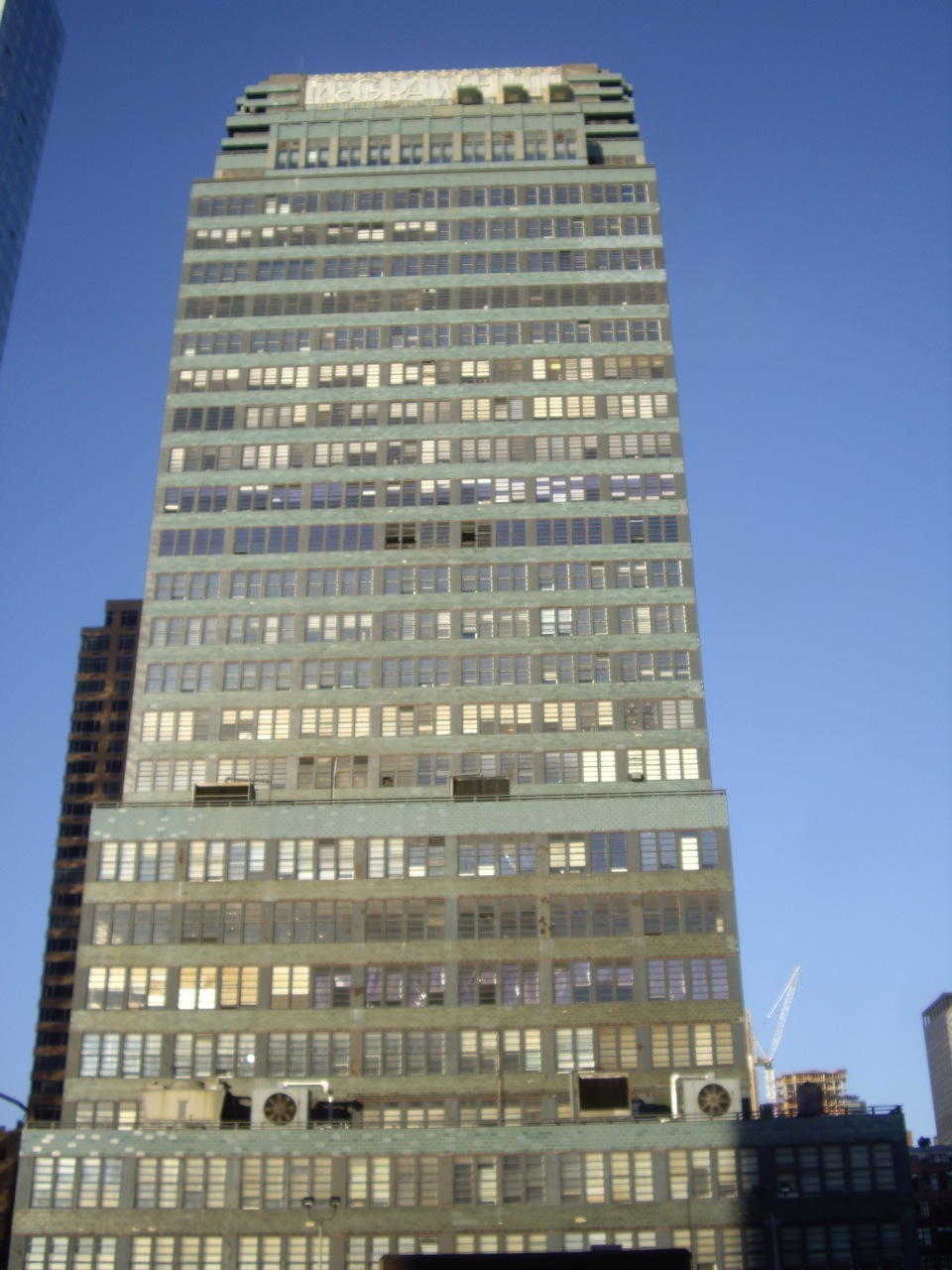
A view of one of the facades

In designing the building, Hood considered several colors for the terracotta panels, including "Chinese red", orange, yellow, and gray. Ultimately, blue-green was selected for its "atmospheric quality", which was suitable regardless of the color of the sky on any given day. Hood referred to the color as blue, while McGraw-Hill referred to the color as green. McGraw-Hill executive James H. McGraw Jr., who had selected the color himself, was elsewhere for much of the building's construction in 1931, but was reportedly appalled at the color of the building when he returned. Members of the public nicknamed the structure the "Green Building", the "Green Kremlin", the "green giant", and the "green monster" due to its color. Eric Nash likened the color to the Ishtar Gate of Babylon. The blue-green color contrasted with the red and white of the Daily News Building and the black and gold of the American Radiator Building, both of which were also designed by Hood.

There are more than four thousand windows, each of which includes a frame painted apple green. The windows are grouped into sets of three or four, separated horizontally by dark metal spandrel panels, and were built to the maximum height allowed under city construction codes of the time. Due to restrictions on the amount of glass a facade was allowed to have, the windows were divided horizontally by metal bars. The vertical mullions between windows, as well as the tops of each window sash, were painted in vermillion. These painted bands were intended to give the impression that each group of windows was a single window opening.

The windows and terracotta panels were juxtaposed to emphasize the horizontal dimensions, a characteristic of the International Style. This was in great contrast to Art Deco facades, which were more vertically oriented. The only deviation from the facade's horizontal emphasis is on the eastern facade, which contains a pair of blue-green vertical strips at its center. After the structure's completion in 1931, Hood and McGraw-Hill compared the facade to an automobile, a common Art Deco symbol. In particular, Hood thought the facade had a "shimmery, satin finish" similar to that of an automobile.

==== Top stories ====
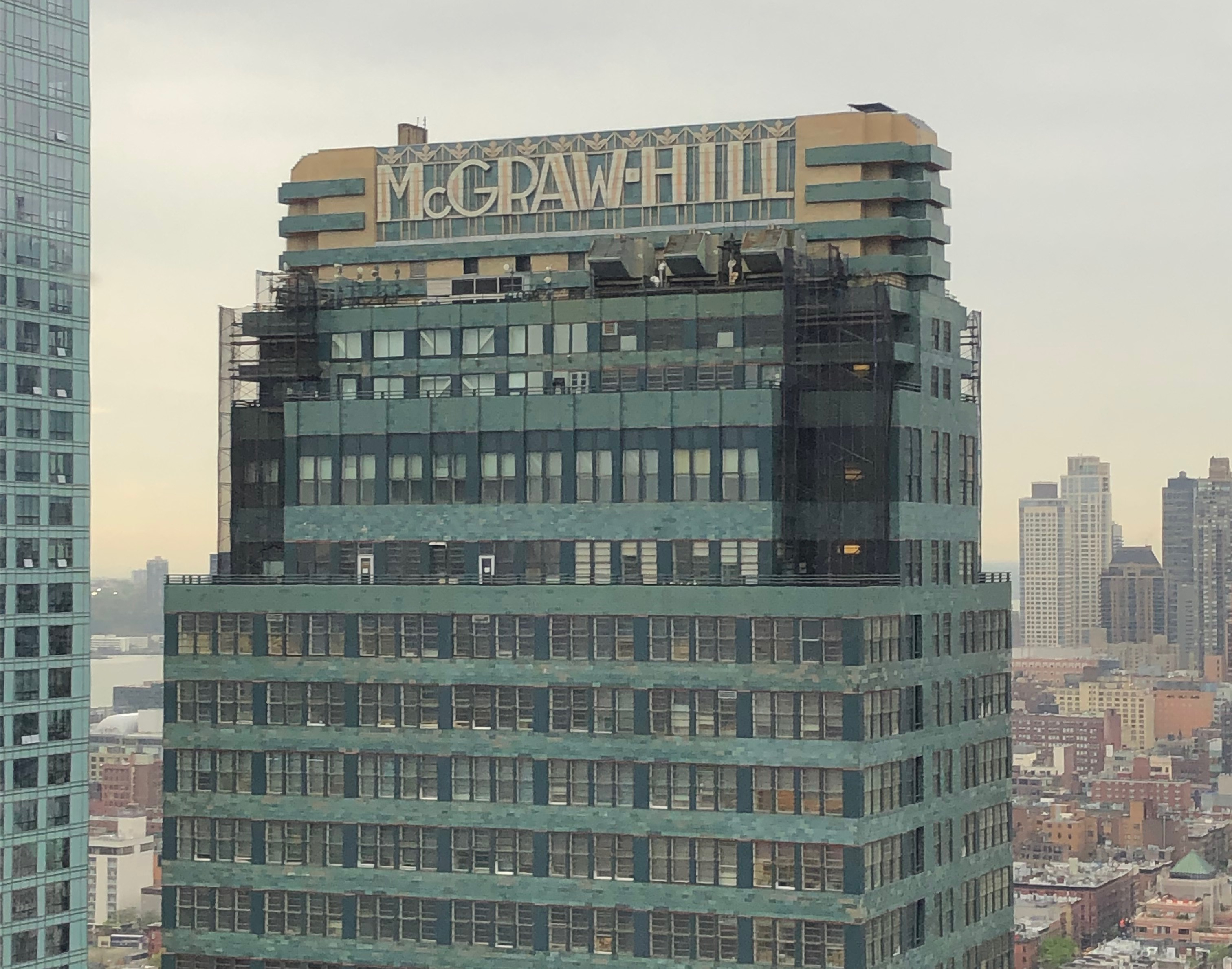
"McGraw-Hill" sign atop the building's crown

The 32nd and 33rd floors consist of projecting sets of piers, between which are pairs of windows. These two stories originally contained the McGraw-Hill executive offices and were designed to emphasize the importance of McGraw-Hill's corporate leadership. A vermillion strip ran underneath the projecting course that surrounded the penthouse. The western and eastern facades are clad with horizontal "ribs" at the 34th and 35th stories. Architectural historian Anthony W. Robins likened the ribbed crown to the "German Expressionism of Erich Mendelsohn".

A set of 11-foot-high (3.4 m) Art Deco-style letters with the words "McGraw-Hill" is mounted in front of the 34th-story windows. These letters, custom-made of terracotta blocks, stood against the blue and green terracotta panels of the facade, concealing the mechanical equipment atop 330 West 42nd Street. They were painted white with orange stripes, but the original colors were concealed when McGraw-Hill sold the building. At some point in the late 20th century, the New York City Landmarks Preservation Commission approved a motion to change the letters to "GHI", representing former owner Group Health Insurance, although it was changed back in the 1990s.

=== Features ===
The McGraw-Hill Building contains 575,000 square feet (53,400 m^{2}) of interior space. As designed, McGraw-Hill used about three-quarters of the total internal space. McGraw-Hill required about 350,000 square feet (33,000 m^{2}) for office space, while another 200,000 square feet (19,000 m^{2}) were rented out as office space.

==== Lobby ====
The original lobby covered about 2,650 square feet (246 m^{2}) and led from the 42nd Street entrance to two elevator banks. The lobby's design was a continuation of the exterior, a common trend for Art Deco designs. It originally consisted of a passageway from the 42nd Street entrance, whose walls were decorated with similar dark-green and light-blue bands as the entranceway. Doorways led to the bookstore on the left (east) wall and the bank on the right (west) wall. The elevator lobby contained solid green enamel walls. The elevator doors were made of metal and decorated with bronze stripes, while floor-indicator markers hung above the doorways. Elevator staff wore green uniforms to correspond with the green baked-enamel interiors of each elevator cab.

The original lobby was demolished in 2021. The modern lobby contains an atrium measuring 35 feet (11 m) high. There is a reception area to the left and a large seating area to the right. Gerard Nocera, a managing partner for the asset manager that controlled the building, said at the time that it would be an attraction in itself for tenants.

==== Upper floors ====
Industrial tenants used the second through tenth floors, which were larger and relatively poorly lit, while offices were placed on the smaller, better-lit upper floors. The industrial stories were largely designed for functional purposes, with elevator banks at the center of each floor. The ceilings of these industrial stories were generally between 12 and 18.5 feet (3.7 and 5.6 m) tall, and the floor slabs were intended to support heavy loads. The printing plant was placed below the sixth-floor setback, while book production was housed in the loft space above the setback. The bindery was on the fifth floor, the press room on the sixth floor, and the composing room on the seventh floor. The printing equipment was removed by 1933.

The upper stories were designed in a relatively simple style, characterized by Architecture Plus magazine as "Raymond Hood Colonial". The ninth through 15th floors had been exclusively intended for rental use, while McGraw-Hill generally occupied the 16th to 33rd floors. On the office floors, natural light illuminated each story to a depth of 40 to 60 feet (12 to 18 m). A few partitions were erected on these stories, creating an open plan with various open spaces for McGraw-Hill's subsidiaries. Except for the 32nd and 33rd stories, there were generally no private offices, as an employee who desired such privacy could work from home instead. The penthouse at the 32nd and 33rd stories originally contained the corporate suites of McGraw-Hill Publishers. The McGraw-Hill corporate offices were relatively conservative in design, being designed in the Georgian and Colonial Revival styles. These stories also contained a cafeteria for McGraw-Hill executives and a 250-seat auditorium.

Following a 2021 renovation, the upper floors are still arranged in an open plan. The ceilings had been modified so the structural steel beams were exposed. In addition, the windows were replaced, and some of the suites have terraces. There are several tenant lounges, conference areas, event spaces, and a fitness center. The setbacks have nine landscaped terraces that collectively cover 20,000 square feet (1,900 m^{2}). After the COVID-19 pandemic, the heating, ventilation, and air conditioning systems were also completely replaced, and air filters were installed.

== History ==
=== Development ===
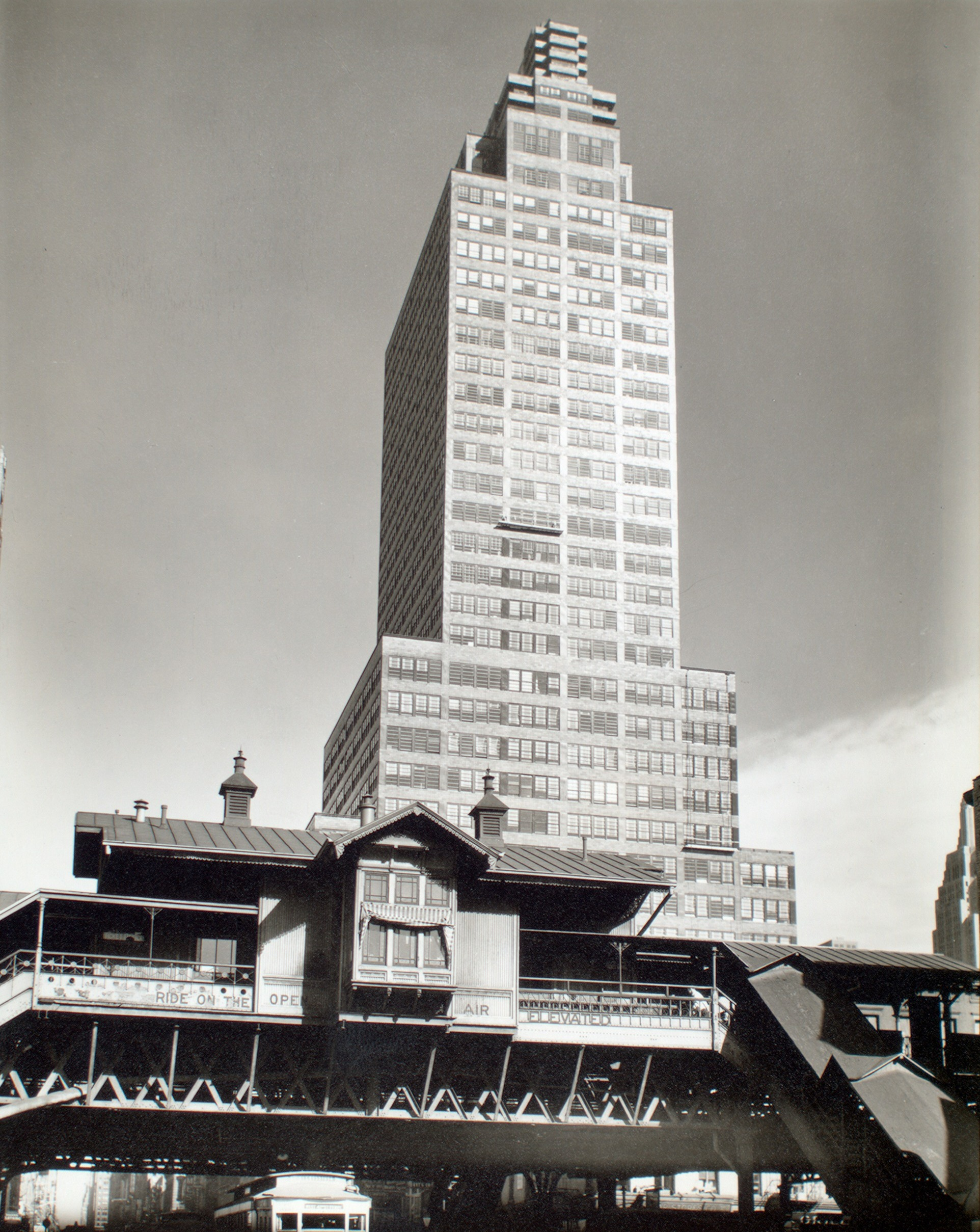
Seen from Ninth Avenue in 1936, with the former 42nd Street station in the foreground

The McGraw-Hill Publishing Company was formed in 1917 when James H. McGraw and John A. Hill merged their respective companies. It was then headquartered at the Hill Publishing Building at 475 Tenth Avenue, at the corner with 36th Street. With numerous acquisitions of other companies over the following decades, the McGraw-Hill Publishing Company found its existing space insufficient by the late 1920s. The twelve-story building at Tenth Avenue was expanded by an additional story, and some freight elevators in that building were converted to passenger use. Even so, by 1929, employees of that building were being asked to walk up or down some flights rather than take the elevators. The same year, a committee was appointed to oversee the development of a new building.

The new-building committee considered numerous sites in the area bounded by 47th Street, Second Avenue, 34th Street, and Ninth Avenue. The group identified Larkin's 42nd Street lot, as well as another lot at Eighth Avenue and 41st Street, half a block east, as feasible sites. In May 1930, McGraw-Hill Companies bought the 47,500-square-foot Larkin site at 326–346 West 42nd Street and 327–345 West 41st Street. The Larkin site had been selected specifically for its convenience and relatively low price. McGraw-Hill intended for its skyscraper to accommodate both commercial and industrial uses, and much of Midtown Manhattan was not zoned for such a purpose. Furthermore, the site was near the major rail hubs at Grand Central Terminal and Pennsylvania Station; post offices; and the Engineering Societies' Building and Engineers' Club.

Construction began on December 29, 1930, when the first rivet was driven by the publishing company's vice president, James H. McGraw Jr. Starrett Brothers, the main contractor, hired about 800 construction workers for the project. Steelwork started immediately afterward. The company secured a $3.8 million loan to finance the building's construction a week after work started. Work progressed quickly and was nearly completed by June 1931; that month, twenty workers received awards for "superior craftsmanship".

=== McGraw-Hill use ===
==== Early years ====
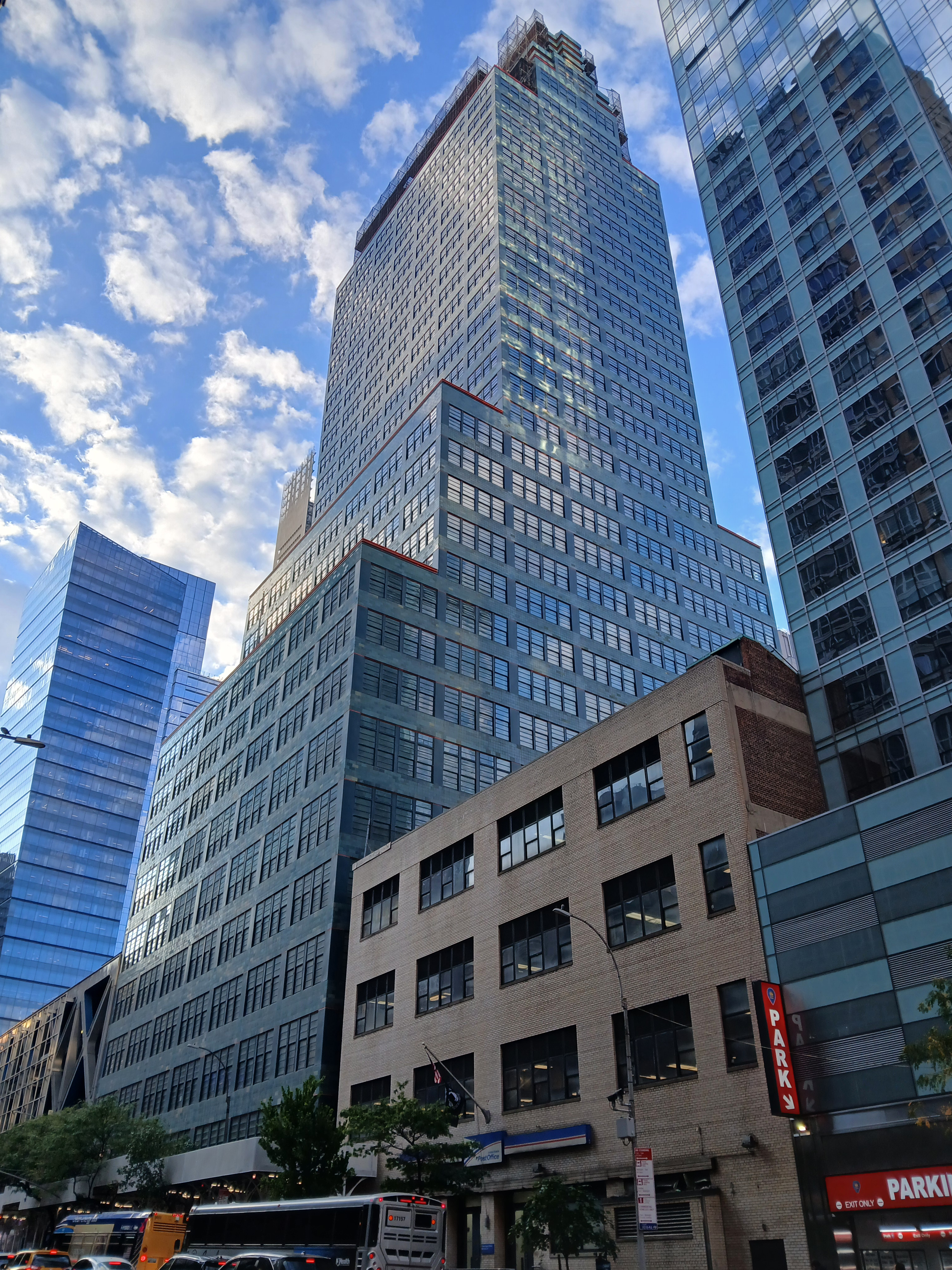
The building seen from just east of Ninth Avenue

McGraw-Hill's publishing division moved into the building by October 25, 1931. Six weeks later, the McGraw-Hill Book Company relocated from its longtime headquarters at 370 Seventh Avenue to the new building at 330 West 42nd Street. Construction had taken fourteen months from planning to completion. The building had initially been expected to cost $2.7 million but ran $642,000 over budget. As one of the tallest buildings in Hell's Kitchen at the time, the McGraw-Hill Building stood out from the rest of the neighborhood. The company hoped the building would be one of several on 42nd Street after a planned rezoning of the street that never happened.

Frank Gale of McGraw-Hill wrote in January 1932, three months after the building's completion, that only six of the 33 usable office stories were not yet occupied. With the onset of the Great Depression, the industrial equipment on the lower floors was sold in January 1933. In addition to McGraw-Hill's headquarters, space was rented to tenants such as the J. C. Valentine Company; the Topics Publishing Company; Charles Eneu Johnson, a printer-ink supplier; Media Records, an advertising-statistics company; the International Development Corporation; the Edge Moor Iron Company; United Cigar Stores; the Home Owners' Loan Corporation; and the Adolphe Hurst Company, an importing concern. By 1935, the building was almost fully occupied. Subsequent tenants included pulp publisher Martin Goodman, who founded Timely Comics (later Marvel Comics) at the building in 1939, as well as soap firm Givaudan. McGraw-Hill experienced financial issues of its own, occupying only 34 percent of the floor area by 1939.

==== 1940s to 1970s ====
During World War II, the McGraw-Hill Building's owners devised emergency blackout procedures in case of an air raid warning because of the building's large number of windows relative to other structures in the area. The western part of McGraw-Hill's lot, which had not been developed for the McGraw-Hill Building, was proposed as the site of an interstate bus terminal in 1940 due to the building's proximity to the Lincoln Tunnel entrance to New Jersey. The terminal was approved in early 1941, but plans for the terminal were delayed by the war, and the terminal was ultimately built one block south in 1950. The adjacent lot was ultimately developed as a post office. In the mid-1950s, the Port Authority of New York and New Jersey started training "spotters" to look at traffic on the Lincoln Tunnel approaches from the 35th floor of the McGraw-Hill Building. The spotters used two-way radios to direct traffic, as well as a closed-circuit television camera mounted on the top of the building.

The McGraw-Hill Companies moved some of its publications to 1301 Avenue of the Americas in 1964 due to a lack of space at 330 West 42nd Street. At that time, the company occupied 94 percent of the space at 330 West 42nd Street and was planning to expand the structure. The company also took space at 620 Eighth Avenue. McGraw-Hill then announced its intention to develop additional stories atop the Port Authority Bus Terminal annex, being built immediately to the east, but the plan did not come to fruition. The company was unable to expand to the west because the post office was there. Ultimately, McGraw-Hill announced in 1967 that it would construct a new headquarters at 1221 Avenue of the Americas, one of the "XYZ Buildings" at Rockefeller Center. McGraw-Hill sold 330 West 42nd Street to C. Russell Feldmann in 1970. The sale price was subsequently reported at $15 million. McGraw-Hill retook the property in February 1973 to satisfy an unpaid mortgage of $11.1 million, netting McGraw-Hill a profit of $4 million.

=== Late 20th century ===
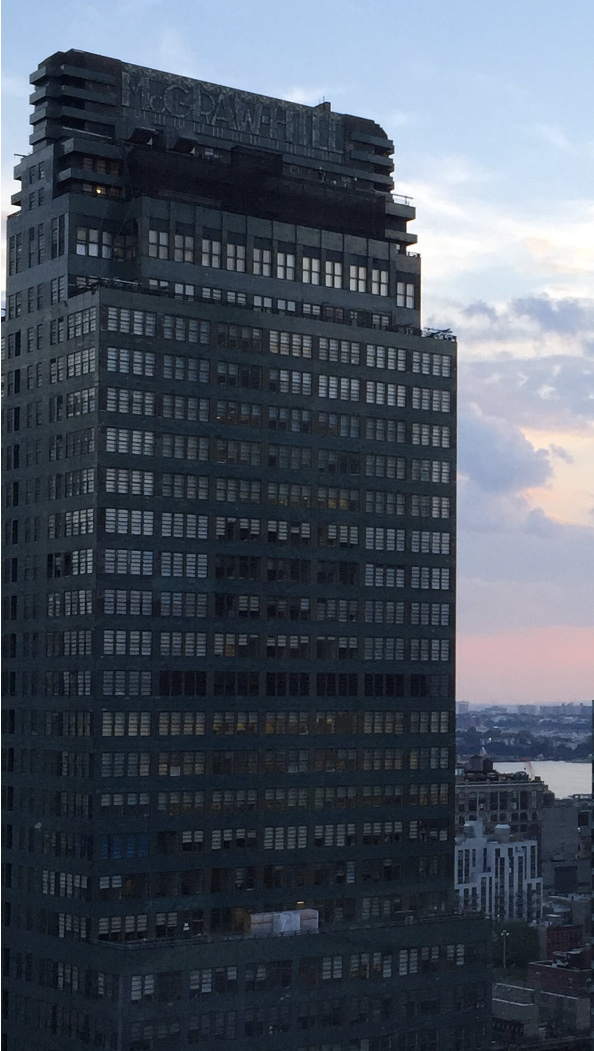
Seen in 2015

McGraw-Hill moved to 1221 Avenue of the Americas in 1972. Its old headquarters at 330 West 42nd Street was listed for sale at under $15 million, less than ten percent of the $175 million construction price of its new building. Despite the relatively low price, 330 West 42nd Street stood vacant for three years, during which only a maintenance crew of ten workers was staffed in the building. The vacancy was attributed to developers' reluctance to take space on West 42nd Street, which The New York Times described as "tawdry", and the fact that the neighborhood was becoming more decrepit. During this time, McGraw-Hill lost $650,000 per year on maintenance and taxes for the vacant building.

The building was purchased in late 1974 by medical insurance company Group Health Insurance (GHI) for $5.5 million, becoming the GHI Building. At the time, GHI was headquartered at 230 West 41st Street, one block west, but urgently needed another 350,000 square feet (33,000 m^{2}). Through the end of the 1970s, only one-third of the building was occupied, and GHI was the primary tenant. The rundown character of the Hell's Kitchen neighborhood meant that rent at 330 West 42nd Street was relatively cheap, and thus, the office space was taken by organizations like the 42nd Street Development Corporation. Following lobbying from that organization, the LPC designated 330 West 42nd Street as a city landmark on September 11, 1979. The building was also listed on the National Register of Historic Places on March 28, 1980, and added to the New York State Register of Historic Places on June 23, 1980.

330 West 42nd Street was taken over by Newmark & Company in February 1980, although GHI remained in the building. The new owners commenced a $2 million rehabilitation of the building; to reduce vacancies, Newmark president Jeffrey Gural rented space to any tenants who could reliably pay. The lobby was renovated by architects Warner Burns Toan & Lunde and interior designers Valerian Rybar and Jean-François Daigre. Mechanical systems were also updated throughout the building. A site-specific artwork, an angular metal sculpture by Owen Morrel known as Boomerang, was mounted 300 feet (91 m) up the southeast corner in 1981. By the end of that year, 330 West 42nd Street was fully rented again, due in part to the redevelopment of the surrounding stretch of 42nd Street. Gural had become more selective with tenants, only accepting large leases and telling The New York Times in 1981 that he could bring the building to full occupancy "three times over in ten minutes". These tenants included a Paine Webber trading floor. The base of the building became a popular performance venue for bands.

330 West 42nd Street was declared a National Historic Landmark on June 29, 1989. GHI moved out of 330 West 42nd Street in 1994, taking space at its own building at 441 Ninth Avenue. The same year, Deco Towers Associates, a foreign investment group, acquired 330 West 42nd Street as its sole property. The sale had become complicated by the fact that the Federal Deposit Insurance Corporation had taken over the building's mortgage holder, the American Savings Bank, which had gone bankrupt. A long-term restoration of the building began in 1998 and continued over the next two decades. Shortly after the project began, Deco Towers dismantled Boomerang, having found severe deterioration in that sculpture during inspections over the previous five years. The company had offered to give the work to Morrel or restore it if funding was provided. The New York City Department of Cultural Affairs (DCLA) moved to a 13,000-square-foot (1,200 m^{2}) space at 330 West 42nd Street in 1998, having been forced to relocate from 2 Columbus Circle. The DCLA relocated to the city-owned Surrogate's Courthouse in 2006.

=== 21st century ===
330 West 42nd Street received some facade renovations during the mid-2010s. The restoration of the facade, designed by Cosmo Veneziale, won an award in 2019 from the New York Landmarks Conservancy. At the time, the Service Employees International Union (SEIU) was a major tenant, although its lease was scheduled to expire in October 2020. Deco Towers announced in 2018 that it planned to convert the 16th through 34th floors into residential condominiums, following the expiry of SEIU's lease. The plan to convert the upper stories into apartments was subsequently abandoned.

==== Renovation and residential conversion ====
By early 2021, the building had been vacated in preparation for its renovation. That February, the LPC approved a plan by Moed de Armas and Shannon Architects (MdeAS) to renovate part of the building. The plans called for renovating the facade and signs on the ground floor, as well as a new tenant doorway at West 42nd Street. MdeAS also proposed gutting the streamlined lobby as part of a series of changes to reconfigure the lower floors, formerly occupied by SEIU, for office use. After a tweet about the replacement lobby's design circulated, preservationists petitioned the LPC to grant landmark status to the lobby's interior. A plan to remove the mcgraw-hill sign atop the crown, replacing it with one spelling out the building's address, was rejected by the LPC after opposition from preservationists. The following month, a spokesperson for the building's owner claimed that the lobby had mostly been demolished but that pieces were being stored. According to Gerard Nocera of Resolution Real Estate (the asset manager for Deco Towers), the LPC had rejected three requests to preserve the lobby during the preceding decades. The LPC had declined to protect the lobby because it had been substantially altered during the 1980s.

The $120 million renovation included adding amenities such as outdoor terraces, event rooms, and a fitness center; refurbishing the office floors into an open plan; reconfiguring the lobby; and installing windows and air filters. In addition, Deco Towers replaced windows that were not part of the original design; added doors for loading docks and outdoor terraces; and replaced the elevators. In September 2021, the New York Supreme Court dismissed a lawsuit from preservationists who sought to protect the lobby, in part because the lobby had been substantially modified. The owners were allowed to dispose of the lobby's decorations, which had been placed in storage. The renovation was completed the same month, and Resolution Real Estate started leasing office space.

By late 2022, Deco Towers was considering converting the 12th to 32nd stories into apartments and converting the top two floors into residential amenity spaces because of declining demand for office space during the COVID-19 pandemic. Under this new plan, designed by Gloria Glass of SLCE Architects, the upper floors would largely contain studio apartments and one-bedroom units, as well as several two-bedroom units. This plan also included creating separate entrances on 42nd Street for office and residential tenants. Resolution Real Estate indicated in early 2023 that they would add 224 apartments later that year, and preservationists also advocated for the restoration of the original lobby. Signature Bank, which had placed a $140 million loan on the building, was looking to sell the loan around that time. Signature was unable to sell the loan, and Blackstone Inc. instead bought a portion of the debt. Blackstone and Rialto Capital Management began foreclosing on the building's loan in July 2024; the conversion of the upper floors was still in progress.

== Reception ==
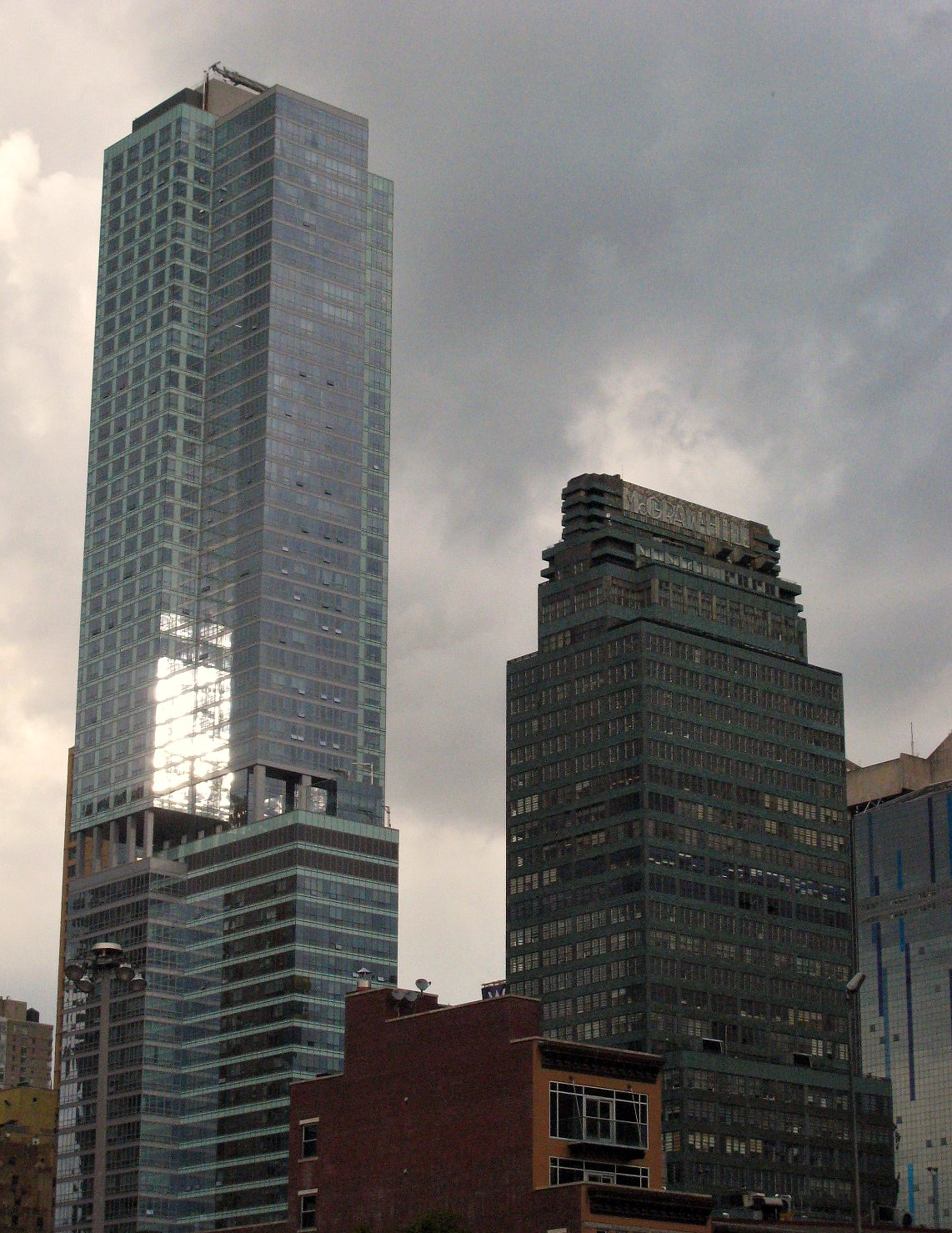
Seen with the Orion at left in 2011

Upon the McGraw-Hill Building's completion, much controversy arose over its use of the International Style, which was then relatively new compared to Art Moderne and Art Deco. George Shepard Chappell, writing in The New Yorker under the pseudonym "T-Square", lambasted the McGraw-Hill Building's use of horizontal lines, saying: "The fact remains that a tall building, considered as a mass, goes up, not sidewise." Chappell found the building's mass and color to be unappealing, though he did approve of the building's limited use of ornamentation. Alfred T. North commented on the building's controversy, saying: "Lacking all of the earmarks of historical architecture, this building is running the gauntlet of criticism." Ultimately, North was unable to determine the style in which 330 West 42nd Street was designed.

Others spoke more positively of 330 West 42nd Street. Upon Hood's death in 1934, shortly after the building's completion, the New York Daily News called the building "among the finest modern achievements in architecture", along with Hood's American Radiator Building, Daily News Building, and Beaux-Arts Apartments. The building was the only skyscraper in the city displayed in Henry-Russell Hitchcock and Philip Johnson's influential International Style exhibition at the Museum of Modern Art in 1932 and one of two American skyscrapers at that exhibition, besides the PSFS Building. Hitchcock and Johnson objected only to the crown, which they described as "an illogical and unhappy break in the general system of regularity". Novelist Ayn Rand regarded 330 West 42nd Street as "the most beautiful building in New York City", and she used it as an inspiration for a fictional structure in her 1943 novel The Fountainhead. In subsequent years, McGraw-Hill came to characterize 330 West 42nd Street as an International Style building.

With the greater acceptance of the International Style, the McGraw-Hill Building became known as an early example of that style, although other writers described it as having a blend of Art Deco and Art Moderne elements as well. Lewis Mumford wrote in 1953 that 330 West 42nd Street's horizontal facade emphasis was a "logical end" to the early-20th-century development of the skyscraper, alongside the Daily News Building's vertical emphasis, the Empire State Building's height, and the New York Hospital's "spacious setting". Meanwhile, Vincent Scully called it "proto-jukebox modern". When McGraw-Hill moved to 1221 Avenue of the Americas, Architecture Plus magazine wrote, "How could a corporate client, which commissioned such an outstanding structure in those difficult days of the Great Depression, find itself moving into one that is, in architectural terms, a nonentity?" During the building's 1970s vacancy, Paul Goldberger called the lobby "one of the best rooms of the period in New York". When GHI bought the building, an opinion writer for The New York Times celebrated the fact that the "distinctive green giant" would be preserved, even though it was not yet an official landmark. The architect Rem Koolhaas said of the McGraw-Hill Building: "Once again Hood has combined two incompatibles in a single whole."

== See also ==
- Art Deco architecture of New York City
- List of National Historic Landmarks in New York City
- List of New York City Designated Landmarks in Manhattan from 14th to 59th Streets
- National Register of Historic Places listings in Manhattan from 14th to 59th Streets
