= Taylorville Chautauqua Auditorium =

- U.S. National Register of Historic Places
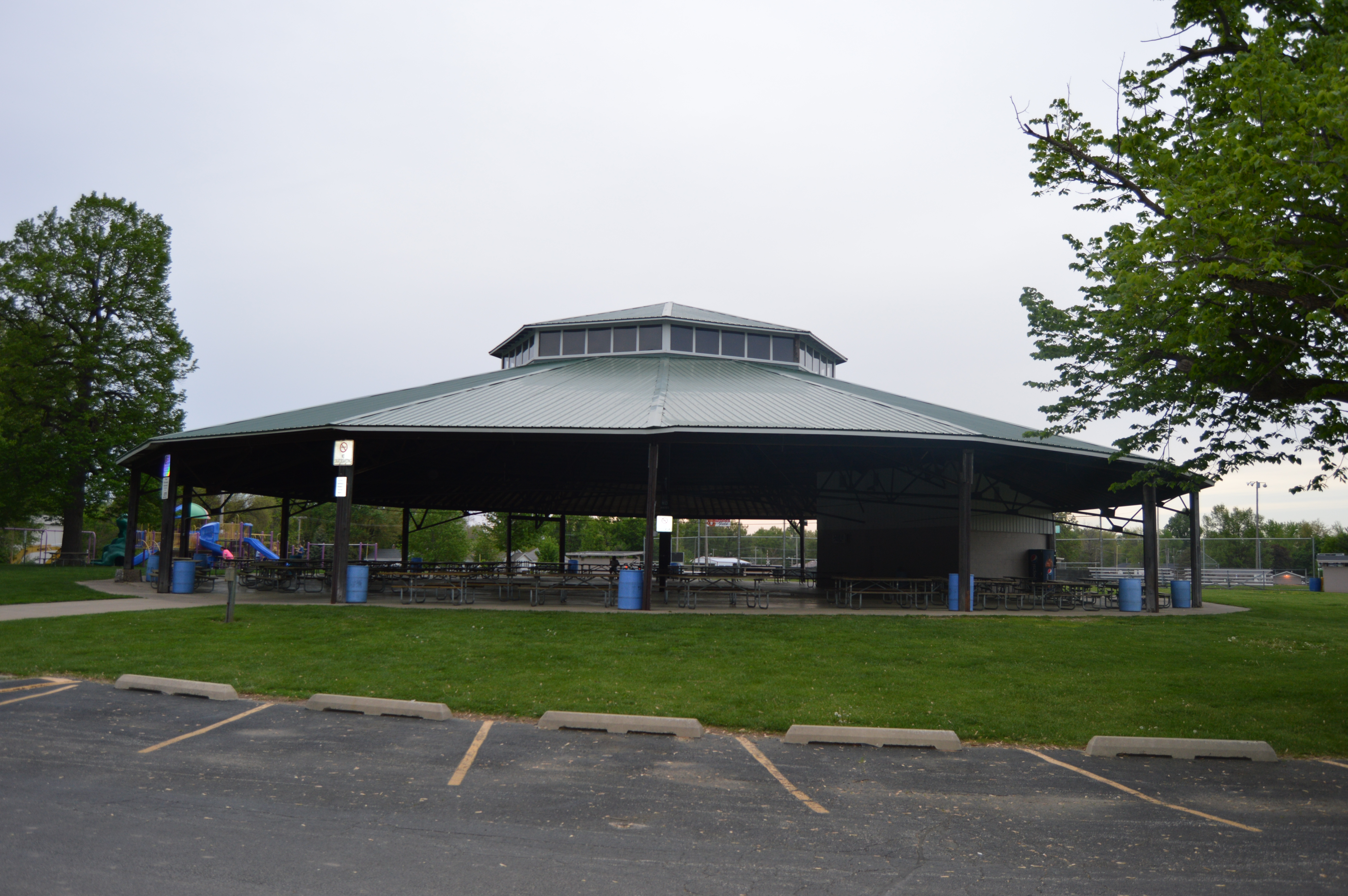

- Location within Illinois Location within the United States
- Location: Manners Park, Taylorville, Illinois
- Coordinates: 39°32′23″N 89°17′45″W
- Area: less than one acre
- Built: 1916
- Built by: Decatur Bridge Co.
- NRHP reference No.: 87002519
- Added to NRHP: January 21, 1988

The Taylorville Chautauqua Auditorium is a Chautauqua auditorium located in Manners Park in Taylorville, Illinois. The auditorium was built in 1916 to house Chautauqua assemblies in Taylorville. Chautauqua was an adult educational movement which sent lecturers, educators, and musicians to assemblies in towns throughout the country during the early 20th century. In Taylorville, Chautauqua assemblies met eight days each year from 1914 through 1928. Lecturers and entertainers who came to the Chautauqua in Taylorville include William Howard Taft, William Jennings Bryan, Helen Keller and Anne Sullivan, Billy Sunday, Irvin S. Cobb, Alvin York, Harry Lauder, and the Chicago Symphony Orchestra.

The auditorium is a sixteen-sided structure built by the Decatur Bridge Company. An octahedral cupola rests atop the main roof. The roof is mainly supported by triangular steel trusses; its only other supports are a single central post and a ring of posts along the outer edge.

The auditorium was added to the National Register of Historic Places on January 21, 1988.
