= Palmer, Illinois =

Palmer
- Village
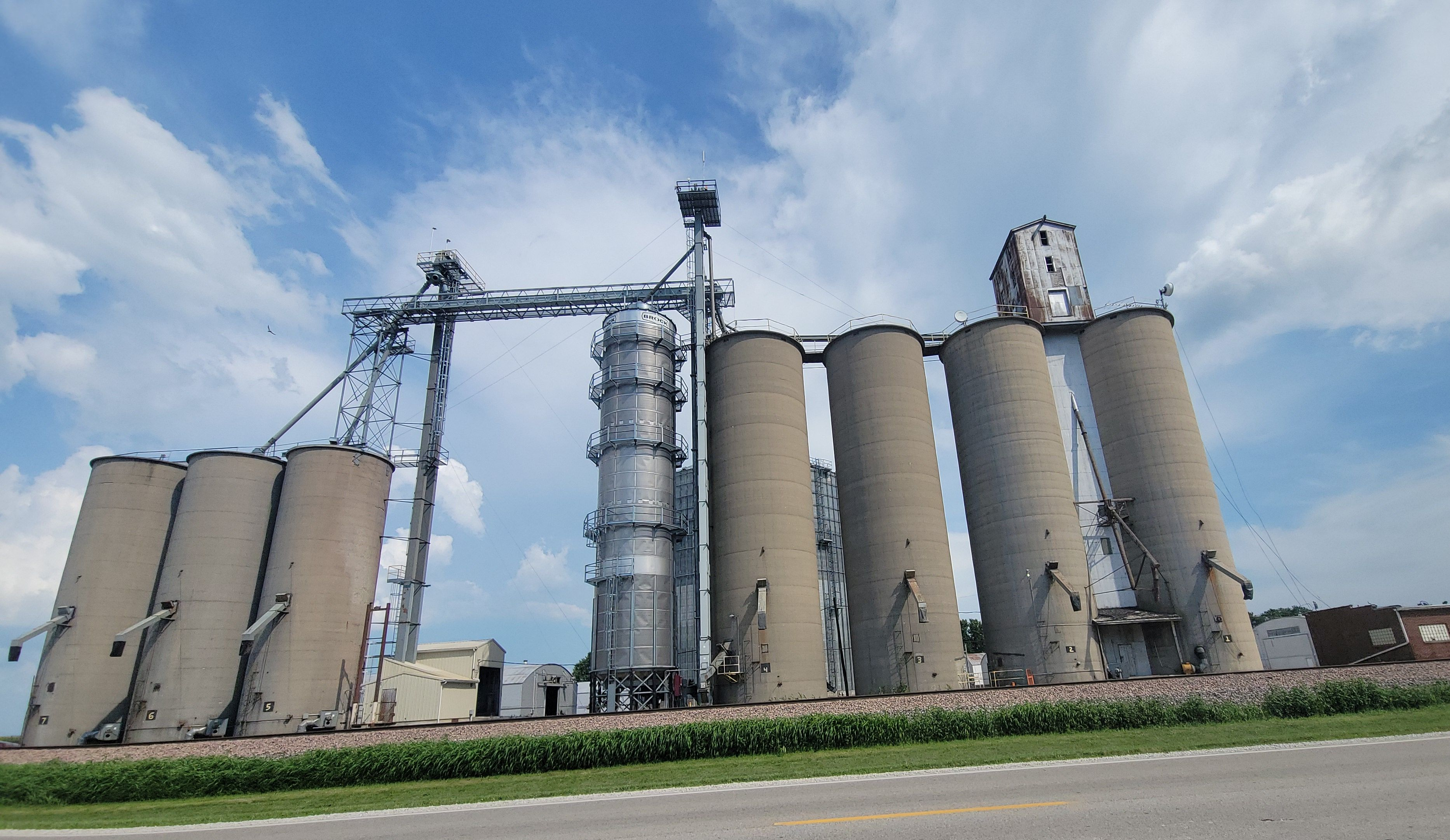
- Grain elevator at Palmer

- Location of Palmer in Christian County, Illinois.
- Coordinates: 39°27′31″N 89°24′29″W
- Country: United States
- State: Illinois
- County: Christian
- Township: Bear Creek
- Founded: 1869
- Incorporated: 1871

Area
  - Total: 1.00 sq mi (2.58 km^{2})
  - Land: 1.00 sq mi (2.58 km^{2})
  - Water: 0 sq mi (0.00 km^{2})
- Elevation: 617 ft (188 m)

Population (2020)
  - Total: 216
  - Density: 217.1/sq mi (83.82/km^{2})
- Time zone: UTC-6 (CST)
  - Summer (DST): UTC-5 (CDT)
- ZIP code: 62556
- Area code: 217
- FIPS code: 17-57303
- GNIS ID: 2399612

Palmer is a village in Christian County, Illinois, United States. The population was 216 at the 2020 census. A railroad line operated by Norfolk Southern runs through the town from southwest to northeast, parallelled by Illinois Route 48.

== History ==
Palmer was founded in 1869 and named for then-governor John M. Palmer. A post office was established at Palmer on January 10, 1871. The village was incorporated on March 30, 1871, and reincorporated under the general incorporation law in 1873.

== Geography ==
According to the 2021 census gazetteer files, Palmer has a total area of 1.00 square mile (2.59 km^{2}), all land.

== Demographics ==
Historical population
Census	Pop.	Note	%±
1880	364		—
1890	432		18.7%
1900	299		−30.8%
1910	404		35.1%
1920	312		−22.8%
1930	281		−9.9%
1940	326		16.0%
1950	335		2.8%
1960	265		−20.9%
1970	244		−7.9%
1980	278		13.9%
1990	275		−1.1%
2000	248		−9.8%
2010	229		−7.7%
2020	216		−5.7%
U.S. Decennial Census

As of the 2020 census there were 216 people, 119 households, and 94 families residing in the village. The population density was 217.09 inhabitants per square mile (83.82/km^{2}). There were 100 housing units at an average density of 100.50 per square mile (38.80/km^{2}). The racial makeup of the village was 95.83% White, and 4.17% from two or more races. Hispanic or Latino of any race were 0.46% of the population.

There were 119 households, out of which 36.1% had children under the age of 18 living with them, 53.78% were married couples living together, 11.76% had a female householder with no husband present, and 21.01% were non-families. 16.81% of all households were made up of individuals, and 14.29% had someone living alone who was 65 years of age or older. The average household size was 2.66 and the average family size was 2.42.

The village's age distribution consisted of 21.9% under the age of 18, 11.5% from 18 to 24, 19.5% from 25 to 44, 25% from 45 to 64, and 22.2% who were 65 years of age or older. The median age was 43.5 years. For every 100 females, there were 105.7 males. For every 100 females age 18 and over, there were 114.3 males.

The median income for a household in the village was $65,625, and the median income for a family was $75,625. Males had a median income of $37,188 versus $31,250 for females. The per capita income for the village was $24,719. About 3.2% of families and 4.2% of the population were below the poverty line, including 3.2% of those under age 18 and 1.6% of those age 65 or over.
