= James B. Ricks =

American judge (1852–1906)

James Benjamin Ricks
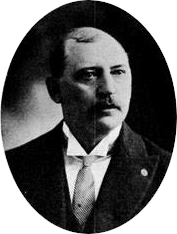
- Ricks, c. 1903.

Justice of the Illinois State Supreme Court
- In office 1901–1906

Mayor of Taylorville, Illinois
- In office 1889–1891

Personal details
- Born: December 23, 1852 Bear Creek Township, Christian County, Illinois
- Died: June 23, 1906 (aged 53) Taylorville, Illinois
- Party: Democratic
- Children: 6 – including Jesse
- Education: Illinois Wesleyan University
- Occupation: Jurist, lawyer, politician

James Benjamin Ricks (December 23, 1852 – June 23, 1906) was an American jurist, lawyer, and politician from Illinois.

== Life and career ==
=== Early life and education ===
James Benjamin Ricks was born on December 23, 1852, in Bear Creek Township, in Christian County, Illinois, to John Bond Ricks and Dorcia B. Ricks (née Haines). Ricks went to Illinois Wesleyan University 1869 to 1872 and then studied law.

=== Career ===
In 1874, Ricks was admitted to the Illinois bar. He then practiced law and was involved in the Democratic Party. Ricks was master in chancery for Christian County. From 1889 to 1891, Ricks served as mayor of Taylorville. From 1901 until his death in 1906, Ricks served on the Illinois Supreme Court, succeeding Jesse J. Phillips.

=== Death ===
Ricks died of stomach cancer at his home in Taylorville, Illinois. He was 53 at the time of his death. He is buried at Oak Hill Cemetery in Taylorville.

== Personal life ==
Ricks was married to Pammie Geltmacher, of Bloomington, Illinois. The couple married on December 23, 1872 – Ricks' 20th birthday. The couple had six children (three of whom reached adulthood) – including Union Carbide executive Jesse J. Ricks.
