= Chanticlare =

Coordinates: 40°48′48″N 73°41′4″W

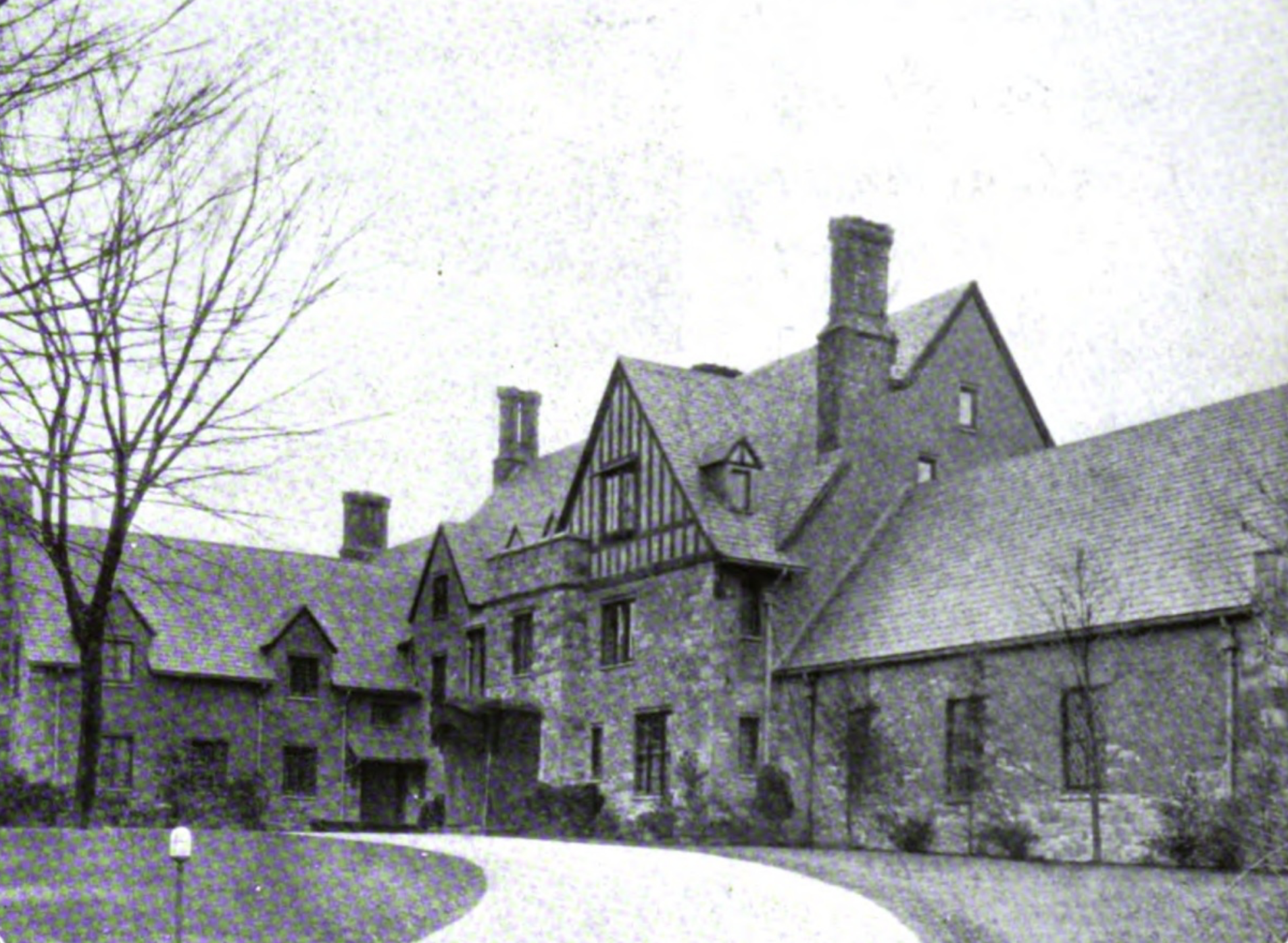
- Chanticlare, as seen in 1929
- Alternative names: Chanticlair; Ricks Estate

General information
- Status: Demolished
- Type: Home
- Architectural style: English Tudor
- Location: Stonytown Road, Flower Hill, New York, U.S.
- Construction started: 1920s
- Demolished: 1960s

Design and construction
- Architect: Frederick A. Godley

Other information
- Number of rooms: 42

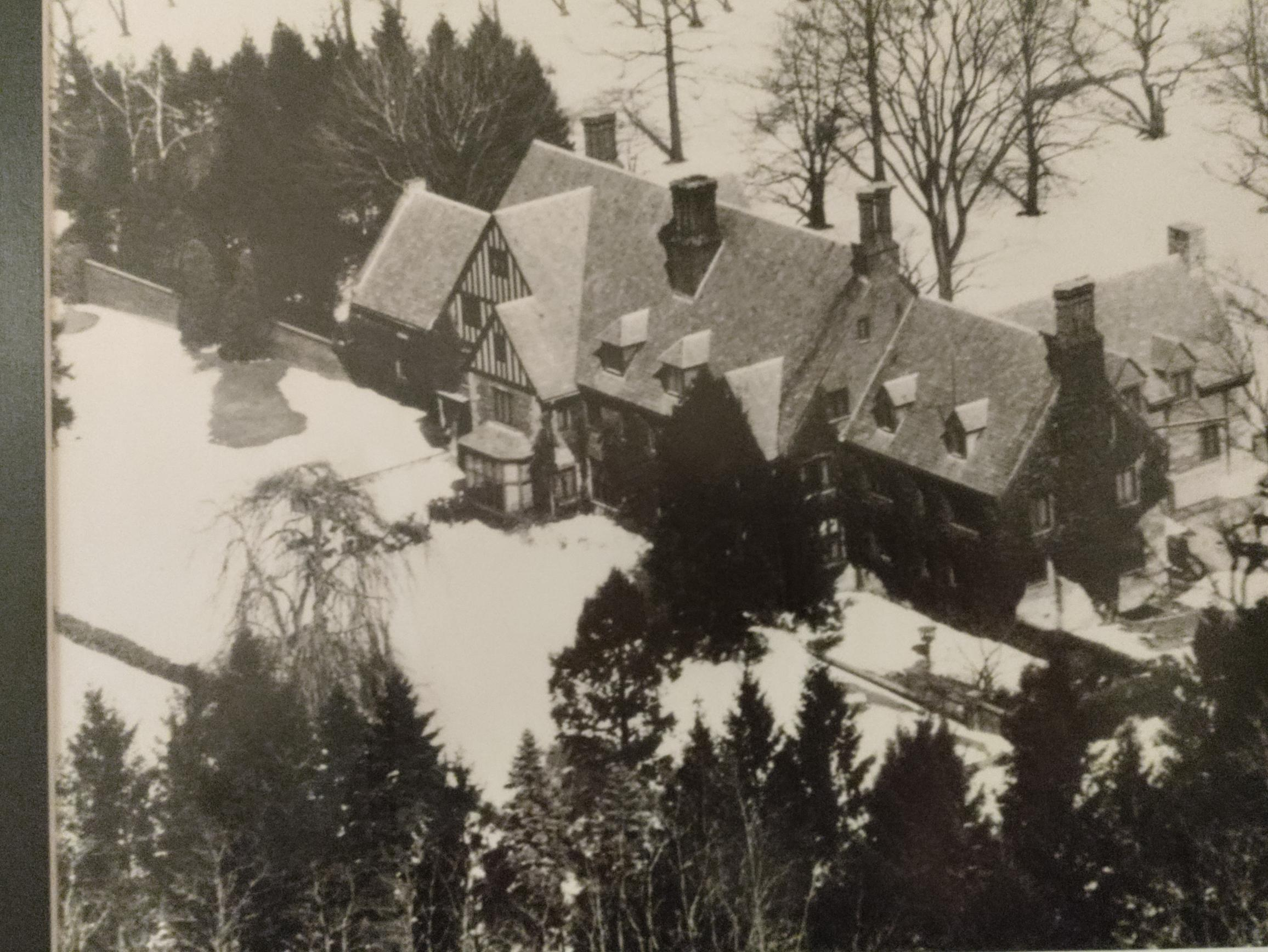
Chanticlare, seen from the air in 1930

Chanticlare (often spelled Chanteclair and also known as the Ricks Estate) was a large, Gold Coast-era estate located in the Village of Flower Hill, on the North Shore of Long Island, in New York, United States.

== Description ==
=== Overview ===
Chanticlare was constructed in the 1920s for attorney and Union Carbide executive Jesse J. Ricks. The mansion, designed in the English Tudor-style by Frederick A. Godley, featured 42 rooms – including a music room/ballroom.

==== Failed preservation efforts ====
In the 1960s, following the deaths of Jesse Ricks and his wife, their children would sell off the remaining land. Originally, the developers of the Chanticlare at Flower Hill subdivision, Edwin and Walter Ketay, wanted to save the mansion, and made attempts to do so. A number of the homes built on as part of the development were designed by architect Stanley H. Klein.

One of the plans for its preservation was for C.W. Post University (now LIU Post) to purchase it and use the space as a music school, an accounting school, and/or administrative offices, amongst other proposed uses by the school. However, in 1967, C.W. Post ultimately chose not to buy the property.

The Ketays soon after tried getting the Nassau County Cultural Society to occupy the home – although the plan was largely opposed by residents.

With all preservation efforts failing, preserving the building proved to be too costly, and the estate was ultimately demolished in the late 1960s and replaced with an additional 4 homes as part of an amended plat map and plan for the Chanticlare at Flower Hill subdivision made by Edwin and Walter Ketay.

=== Remnants of the estate ===
==== Chanticlare pipe organ ====
In 1968, the pipe organ formerly located in Chanticlare's music room was donated by John Ricks and Jane Ricks-King, the children of Mr. and Mrs. Jesse Ricks, to Hofstra University in honor of their late parents.

The three-bank Aeolian electro-pneumatic pipe organ, valued at $115,000 in 1968, was installed in the Adams Playhouse at Hofstra, along with a memorial plaque. In order to house the components of the instrument, Hofstra had to add two chambers onto the Adams Playhouse, totaling 430 square feet (40 m^{2}).

The donation of the organ meant that students at Hofstra studying the organ could practice on-campus as opposed to having to travel off-campus to the nearby Episcopal Cathedral of the Incarnation.

==== Guest house ====
The estate's guest house, located off Stonytown Road, still stands. Like the main mansion, it was also designed by Godley.

== See also ==
- Harbor Hill – Another Gold Coast estate, which was located in nearby East Hills.
- Sunset Hill – Another Gold Coast estate, which was partially in both Flower Hill and Plandome.
