= 2020s commercial real estate distress =

Period of distress in commercial real estate markets

2020s commercial real estate distress was a worldwide spike in commercial real estate distress that began in the 2020s in the wake of the COVID-19 pandemic and interest rates hikes by central banks in response to the 2021 inflation crisis. Although the increase in distress occurred globally it was most acute in the United States and China.

This spike in the number of properties at risk of foreclosure by lenders or of being returned to lenders by their owners, as well as general financial difficulty for REITs and other real estate firms—occurred due to several factors. These include changes in the habits of workers and consumers caused by the COVID-19 pandemic, which has decreased office occupancy and exacerbated the ongoing retail apocalypse, and interest rate hikes by central banks to combat the 2021-2023 inflation surge, which have increased the cost of borrowing and the cost of interest payments on variable rate loans.

== Distress in the United States ==
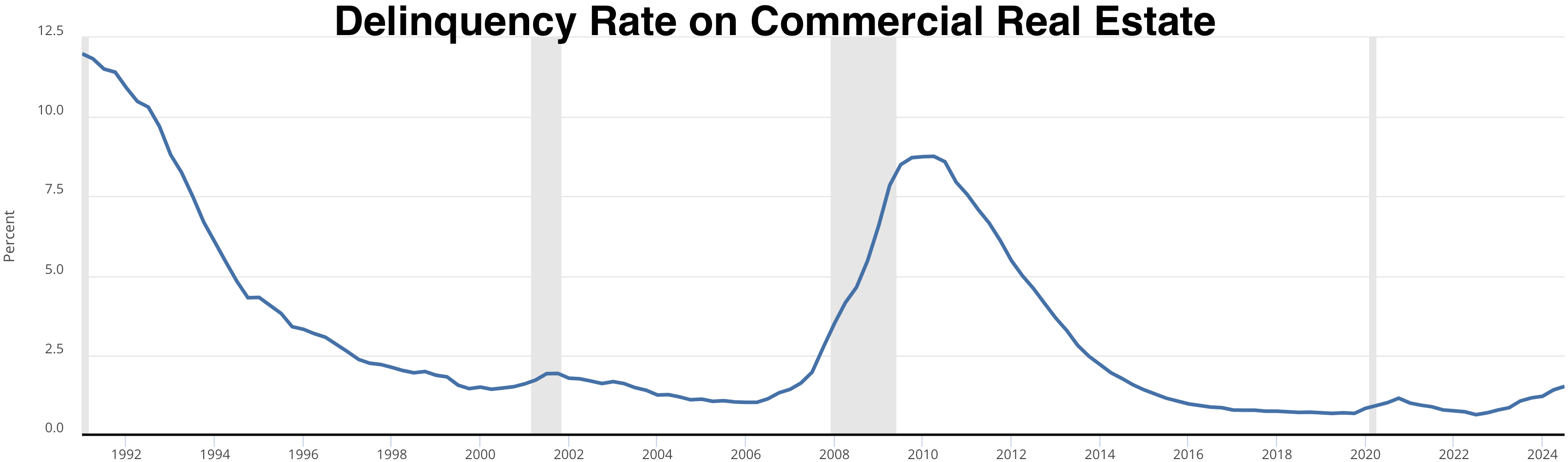
Delinquency rate on commercial real estate loans

=== Background and causes ===
==== United States office glut ====
In the United States, an office surplus predates the COVID-19 pandemic. Overdevelopment, partially attributable to Reagan administration changes to the tax code, as well as a failure to demolish unused buildings, have both contributed to the excess space. Despite a slump in office leasing due to the 2008 financial crisis and its long-term impact, landlords continued to build office space. Excess space has impacted the office vacancy rate in Texas in particular. Sam Zell also blamed co-working firms for disguising the glut by renting large amounts of office space to sublet it, which they then failed to fill with tenants.

==== Retail apocalypse ====
The term "retail apocalypse" refers to the mass closure of brick-and-mortar stores by retailers which accelerated in 2017 and was further exacerbated by the COVID-19 pandemic. These closures have been blamed on ecommerce, income inequality, big box stores, and an increasing preference by consumers to spend on services rather than products, and debt.

==== COVID-19 pandemic and remote work ====
===== 2020-2022: Abrupt transition =====
Due to the COVID-19 pandemic and COVID-19 lockdowns, many workers abruptly transitioned from working in an office to working from home in March 2020. Pre-pandemic, only 3% of American workers claimed to mostly work from home; millions transitioned to such arrangements due to the pandemic. As early as April 2020, commentators including Larry Fink predicted this shift would have a negative impact on demand for commercial real estate and, specifically, office space.

In June 2020, Kastle Systems established a "back-to-work barometer" designed to track office occupancy in major American cities. Kastle manufactures and maintains security systems for commercial buildings, and these systems include terminals for office employees to swipe access cards to enter their place of work. The "Back to Work" barometer tracks card swipe data and uses those numbers to track office occupancy. Kastle reported a decline, from a normalized rate of 96% occupancy in early March 2020, to approximately 18% occupancy by the first week of April 2020.

===== 2022-present: "RTO" and remote work resilience =====
Major finance firms Goldman Sachs and Morgan Stanley began easing COVID-related restrictions related to in-office work in August 2022. Despite policies instituted by some companies to mandate in-person office work, the push to "return to office" was characterized by Rani Molla in Vox as "not that robust" in June 2023.

In the United States, as reported in June 2023, office occupancy was approximately 50% of pre-pandemic occupancy rates. A higher proportion of office workers in Europe and Asia have returned to full-time to the office. In February 2023, the Wall Street Journal reported that office occupancy in Europe and the Middle East was between 70 and 90% of pre-pandemic rates, while in Asia occupancy was generally at 80% or higher, and in some places exceeded pre-pandemic rates. In May 2023, Canadian real estate firm Colliers reported that the vacancy rate for New York City office space was 17.4%, and that some 94 million square feet of office space was listed for lease in the city, a record amount. Office vacancies in the United States reached the highest point in twenty years in October 2023.

Economic research firm Capital Economics predicted in June 2023 that the value of office buildings in the United States would not reach the values they held before the pandemic until 2040, due to the broad transition to remote work.

==== Inflation and rate hikes ====
Beginning in mid-2021, inflation surged internationally. This rise in inflation has been attributed to several causes, including pandemic-related economic dislocation, supply chain problems, the fiscal and monetary stimuli provided in 2020 and 2021 by governments and central banks around the world in response to the pandemic, and price gouging. In response to this rise in inflation, central banks raised interest rates, increasing the cost of borrowing.

=== Distress ===
==== 2020 ====
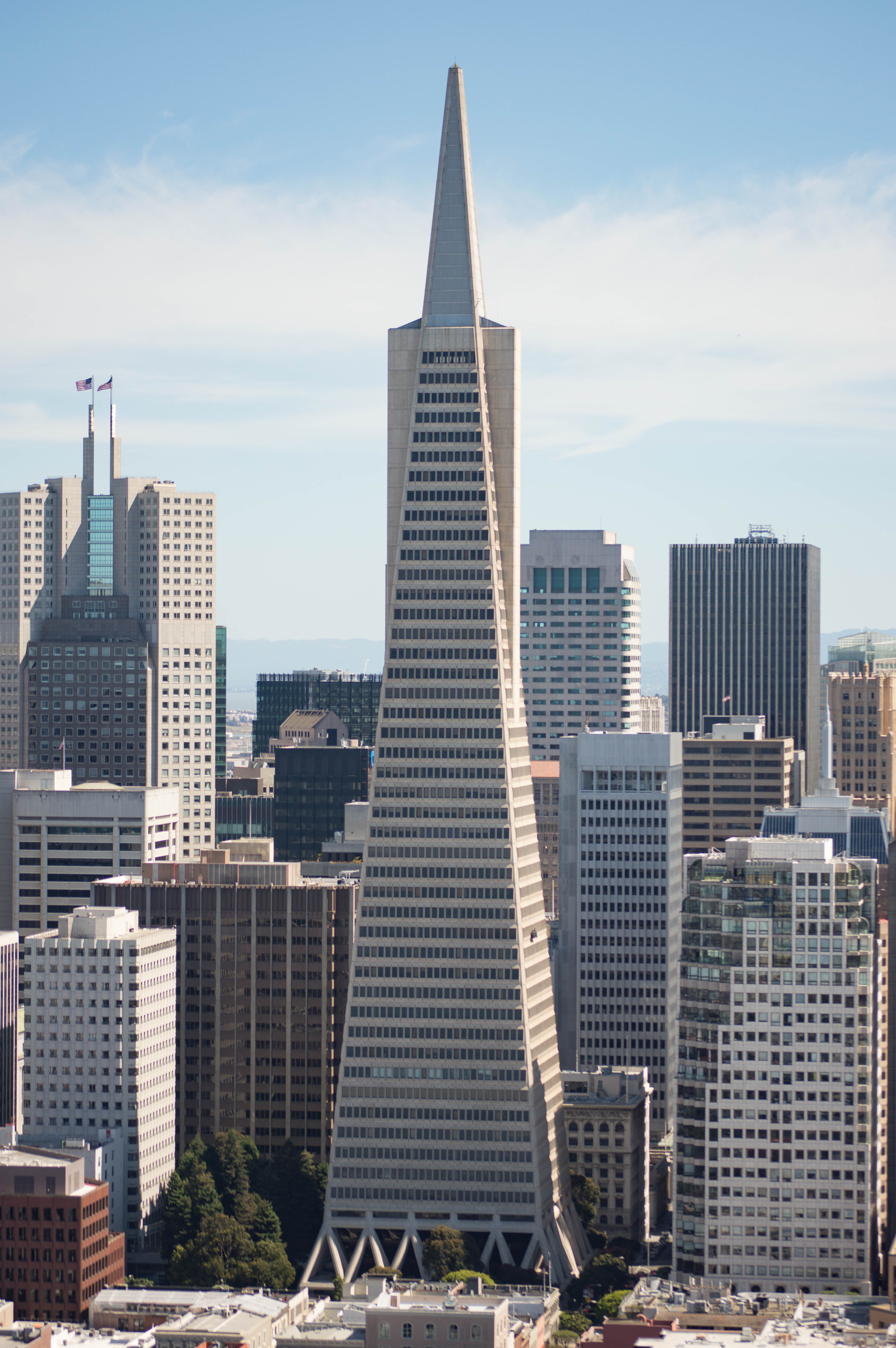
The Transamerica Pyramid

In early 2020, some office and retail tenants were unable to pay rent, withheld rent, or began to negotiate the terms of their leases in response to general economic uncertainty caused by the COVID-19 pandemic. Simon Property Group, an American real estate investment trust that invests in shopping malls and outlet centers, sued clothing retailer Gap, Inc. for unpaid rent in June 2020.

Overall commercial real estate transaction volume fell substantially in the second quarter of 2020. This decrease, a decline of 68% in volume compared the second quarter of 2019, occurred in part due lack of consensus on the value of assets. Individual transactions were also impacted. The Transamerica Pyramid, contracted before the pandemic to sell for approximately $700 million, sold at a 10% discount under the originally negotiated price in July 2020, which Josh Barrow, writing for New York, attributed to the impact of the pandemic. In April 2020, Blackstone elected to walk away from a deal to purchase an office building in Oakland, California, losing a $20 million deposit as a result of the choice.

Anticipating the ability to acquire properties at a discount due to distress, investment and private equity firms raised a considerable amount of capital in 2020.

==== 2021 ====
Transaction volumes for multifamily, life science, and industrial assets rebounded in late 2021. Transaction volume for office assets and malls remained low, as "return to work" pushes were had a more muted than expected impact on office attendance due to the Delta variant.

== Distress in China ==
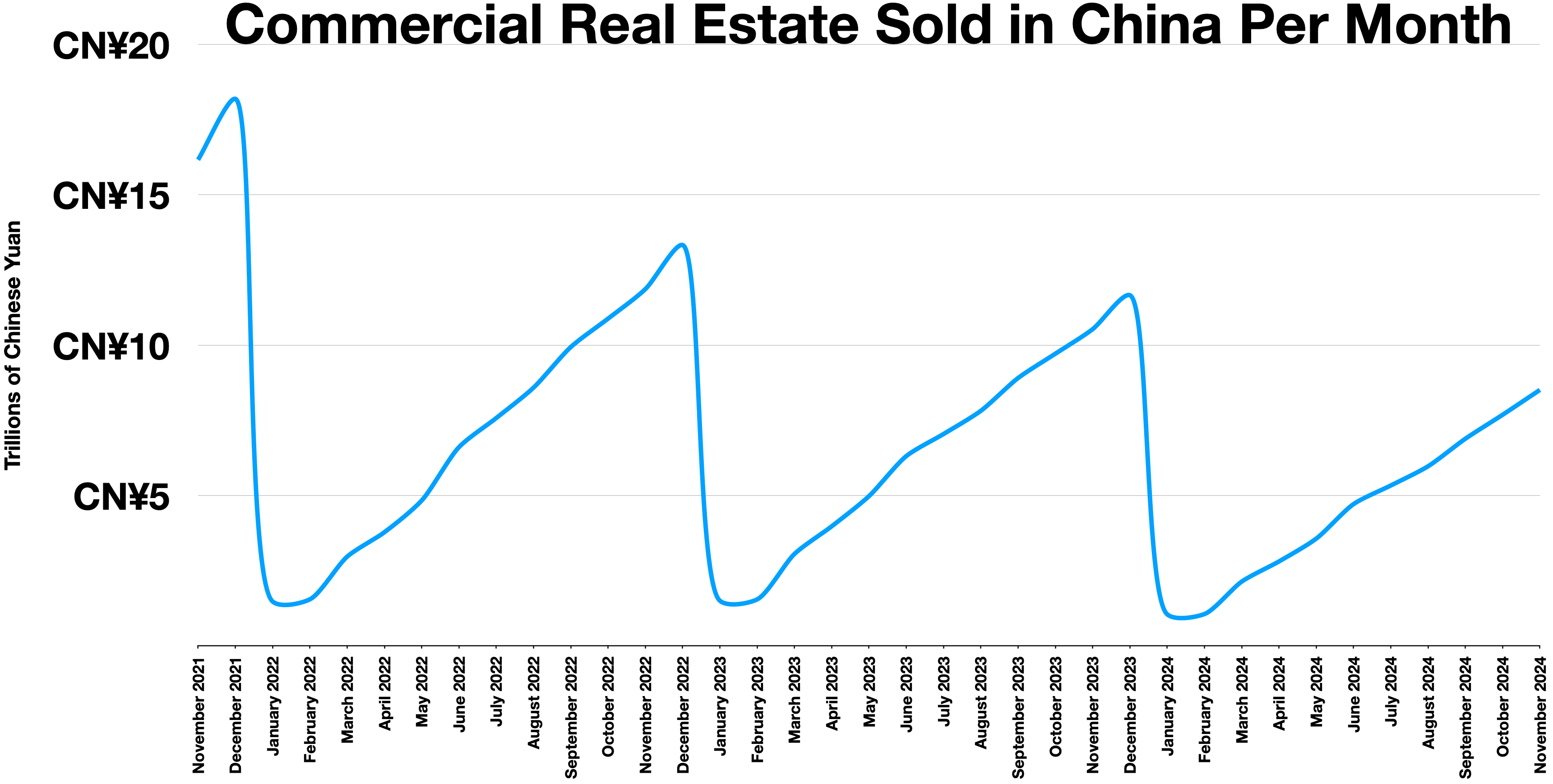
Commercial real estate sold in China per month

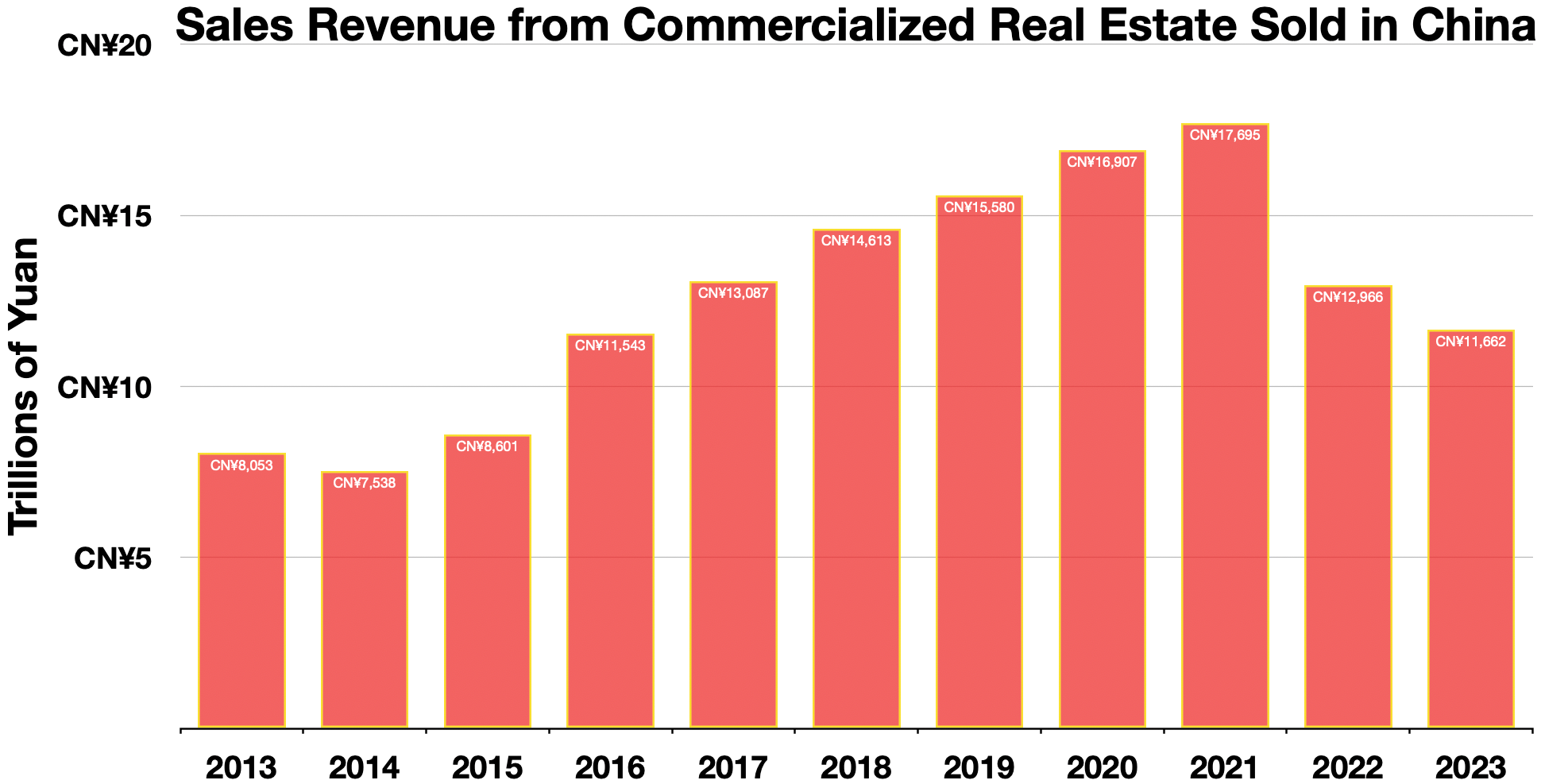
Sales revenue from commercialized real estate sold in China (yearly)

=== 2020–present: property sector crisis ===
Despite the "three red lines", regulations introduced to control the borrowing of Chinese real estate firms, the Chinese real estate developer and conglomerate Evergrande released a statement on 31 August 2021, warning it would default on its debts if it failed to raise enough cash to cover them. At the time, Evergrande was China's most indebted real estate developer. On 24 September 2021, Evergrande missed off-shore bond payments totaling US$83.5 million. While the company had 30 days to avoid defaulting on the debt, analysts felt the company would likely fail to pay its creditors.
