= Jesse Ricks =

American businessman (1879–1944)

Jesse Jay Ricks
- Born: May 15, 1879; Taylorville, Illinois, US
- Died: February 20, 1944 (aged 64); Flower Hill, New York, US
- Education: University of Michigan
- Occupations: Businessman, lawyer
- Known for: Business, law
- Board member of: Union Carbide
- Spouse: Sybil Ricks (née Hayward)
- Children: 4
- Relatives: James Benjamin Ricks (father)

Jesse J. Ricks (May 15, 1879 – February 20, 1944) was an American lawyer and businessman best known for serving as the former President and Board Chairman of the Union Carbide and Carbon Company.

== Biography and career ==
=== Early life ===
Ricks was born on May 15, 1879, in Taylorville, Illinois, to his father, James Benjamin Ricks – the city's former mayor and an Illinois State Supreme Court justice – and his mother, Pammie Geltmacher. He attended the University of Michigan for his college education, where he served as a staff member for the Law Review.

=== Career ===
Ricks began his legal career in Chicago, Illinois, being admitted to the Illinois State Bar Association in 1903. That year, Ricks joined the law firm of Winston & Meagher. After joining the firm, its name eventually became Meagher, Whitney, Ricks, & Sullivan.

In the 1910s, Ricks moved to New York, where he would play a key role in the creation of the Union Carbide and Carbon Company. He would go on to serve as the chemical company's president, chairman, and director. He also served as Union Carbide's general counsel.

In 1941, Ricks went from being President of Union Carbide to its chairman. He was replaced by Benjamin O'Shea.

=== Death ===
Ricks died from an illness on the morning of Sunday, February 20, 1944, in his Long Island estate. He was 64 at the time of his death.

== Personal life ==
Ricks lived in his estate, Chanticlare, in Flower Hill, New York, on Long Island's North Shore. He was married to Sybil Ricks (née Hayward); the couple wed on February 11, 1909, in Niagara, New York. The couple had four children: Jesse Jr., John, Jane, and James.

Ricks was well-known for his avid interests in literature, music, and natural history. He was a member of the American Museum of Natural History, the Wilson Ornithological Society, and the American Forestry Association.
