= Taylorville, Illinois =

- City
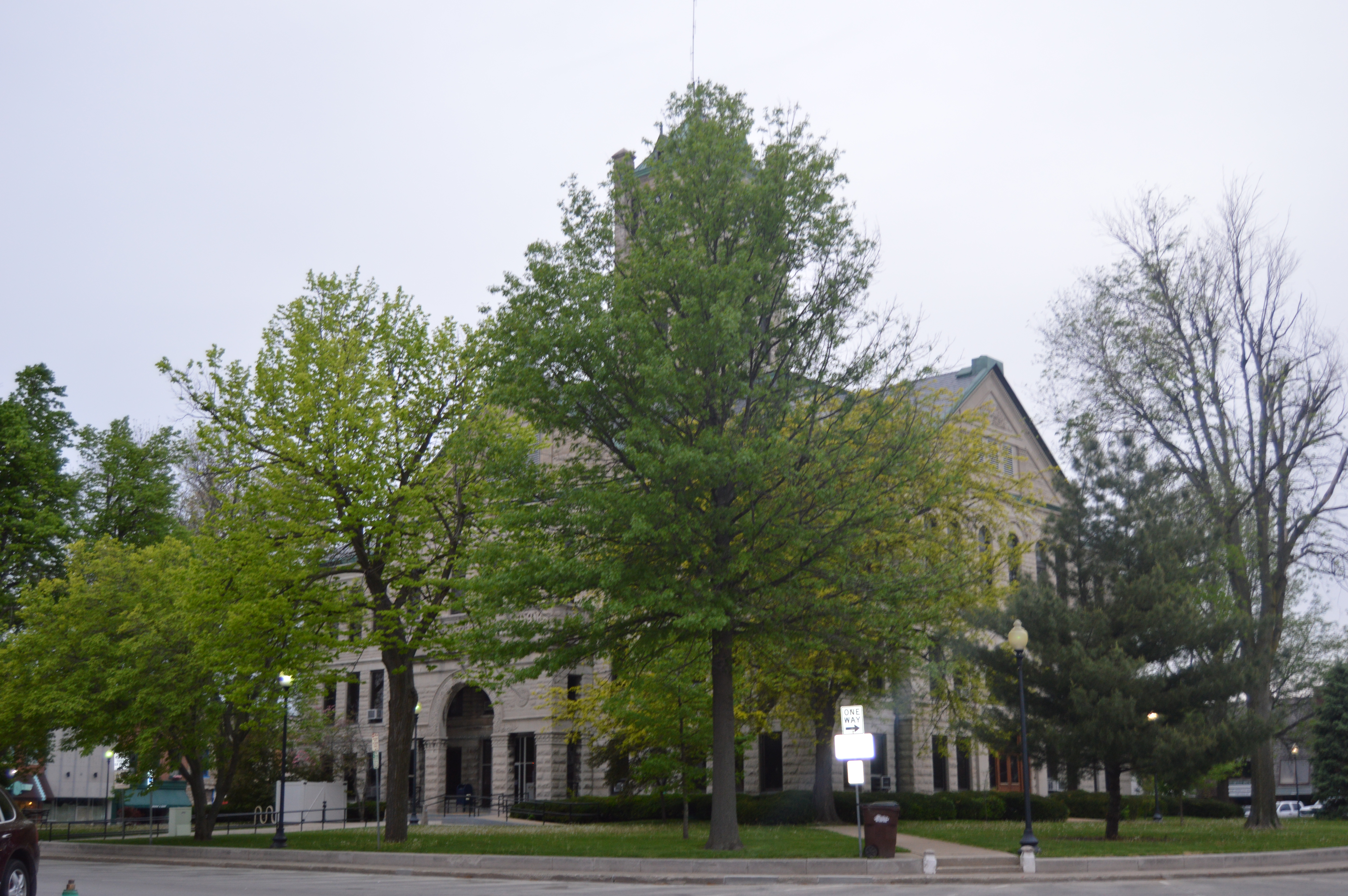
- Christian County Courthouse in Taylorville
- Motto: A Great Place To Live, Work, and Visit
- Interactive map of Taylorville, Illinois
- Location within Illinois Location within the United States
- Coordinates: 39°30′55″N 89°15′50″W
- Country: United States
- State: Illinois
- County: Christian

Area
  - Total: 12.22 sq mi (31.66 km^{2})
  - Land: 10.32 sq mi (26.72 km^{2})
  - Water: 1.91 sq mi (4.95 km^{2})
- Elevation: 617 ft (188 m)

Population (2020)
  - Total: 10,506
  - Density: 1,018.5/sq mi (393.26/km^{2})
- Time zone: UTC-6 (CST)
  - Summer (DST): UTC-5 (CDT)
- ZIP code: 62568
- Area codes: 217, 447
- FIPS code: 17-74574
- GNIS ID: 2396035
- Website: taylorville.net

Taylorville is a city in and the county seat of Christian County, Illinois, United States. The population was 10,506 at the 2020 census, making it the county's largest city.

== History ==
Taylorville was founded on May 24, 1839, and was named after John Taylor, a planning commissioner for the state of Illinois.

Taylorville was known (in the early to mid-1990s) to have had a high rate of neuroblastoma, a cancer affecting the adrenal gland and striking children. The local power company Central Illinois Public Service Company was sued and lost for contaminating the groundwater in 1994.

Some outer homes and a business in Taylorville were damaged by an F1 tornado on April 2, 2006.

On August 11, 2012, a Beechcraft Model 18 airplane crashed into a residential area of Taylorville, killing the pilot but injuring none on the ground. A subsequent NTSB investigation into the accident concluded that an improper flap configuration and failure to maintain the correct airspeed due to pilot error, resulted in the crash.

At about 5:15 pm on December 1, 2018, as part of the December 2018 tornado outbreak, an intense tornado hit Taylorville. The tornado injured at least 26 residents and damaged more than 600 homes and businesses, 34 of which were completely destroyed. Damage surveys by the National Weather Service rated the tornado EF3 with winds over 155 mph (249 km/h).

== Geography ==
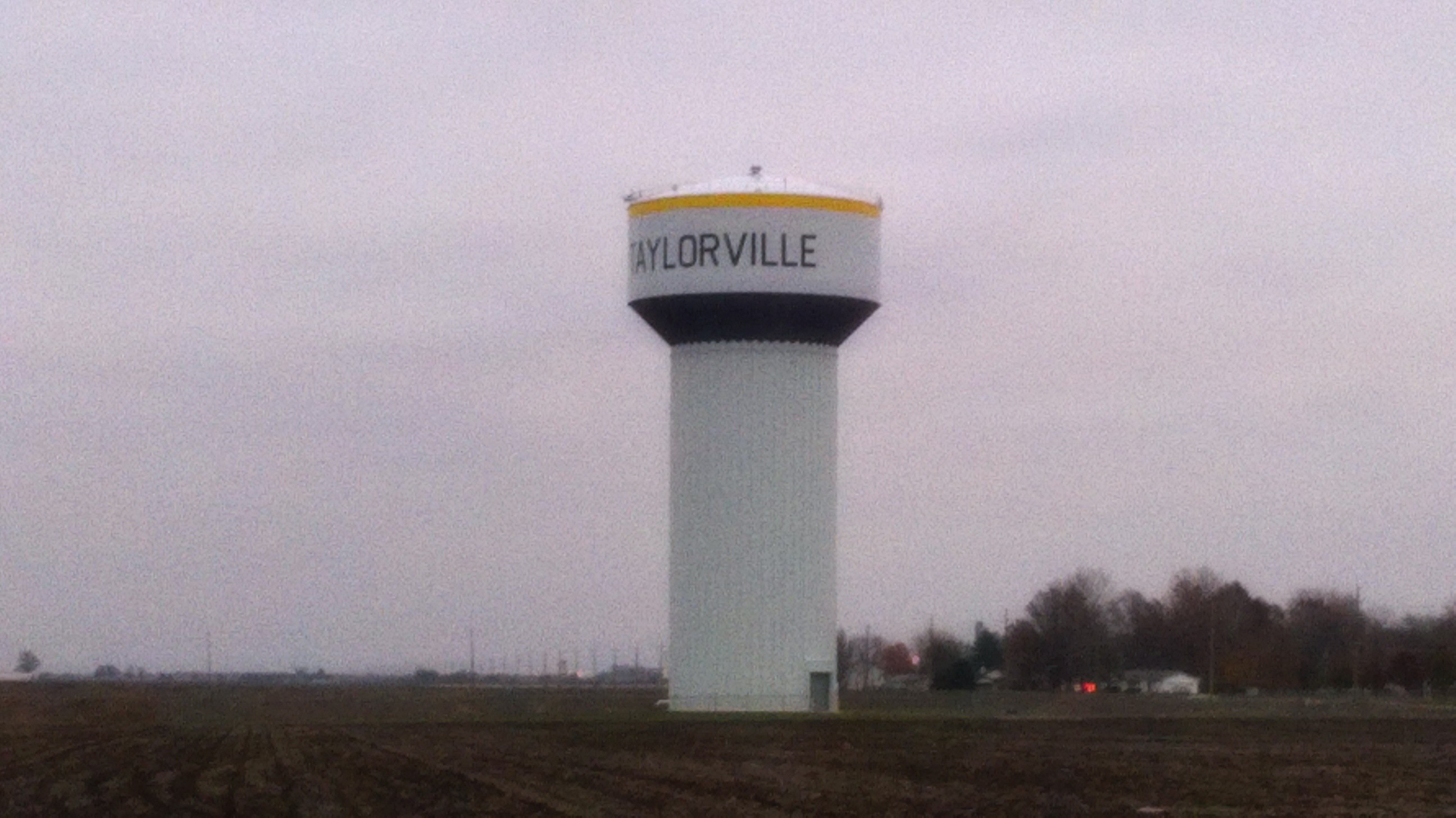
Taylorville water tower

According to the 2021 census gazetteer files, Taylorville has a total area of 12.23 square miles (31.68 km^{2}), of which 10.32 square miles (26.73 km^{2}) (or 84.38%) is land and 1.91 square miles (4.95 km^{2}) (or 15.62%) is water.

== Demographics ==
Historical population
Census	Pop.	Note	%±
1880	2,237		—
1890	2,829		26.5%
1900	4,248		50.2%
1910	5,446		28.2%
1920	5,806		6.6%
1930	7,316		26.0%
1940	8,313		13.6%
1950	9,188		10.5%
1960	8,801		−4.2%
1970	10,644		20.9%
1980	11,386		7.0%
1990	11,133		−2.2%
2000	11,427		2.6%
2010	11,246		−1.6%
2020	10,506		−6.6%
U.S. Decennial Census

=== 2020 census ===
As of the 2020 census, Taylorville had a population of 10,506. The median age was 42.9 years. 20.6% of residents were under the age of 18 and 23.2% of residents were 65 years of age or older. For every 100 females there were 91.3 males, and for every 100 females age 18 and over there were 89.5 males age 18 and over.

96.4% of residents lived in urban areas, while 3.6% lived in rural areas.

There were 4,841 households in Taylorville, including 2,507 families, of which 24.4% had children under the age of 18 living in them. Of all households, 36.6% were married-couple households, 20.8% were households with a male householder and no spouse or partner present, and 34.3% were households with a female householder and no spouse or partner present. About 39.2% of all households were made up of individuals and 18.3% had someone living alone who was 65 years of age or older.

There were 5,336 housing units, of which 9.3% were vacant. The homeowner vacancy rate was 2.5% and the rental vacancy rate was 9.8%.

Racial composition as of the 2020 census
Race	Number	Percent
White	9,856	93.8%
Black or African American	95	0.9%
American Indian and Alaska Native	25	0.2%
Asian	99	0.9%
Native Hawaiian and Other Pacific Islander	2	0.0%
Some other race	55	0.5%
Two or more races	374	3.6%
Hispanic or Latino (of any race)	173	1.6%

== Education ==
The IHSA single season boys' basketball record of 45–0 was set by Taylorville High School in 1944. Ron Bontemps and Johnny Orr were team members.

In 1911, the Taylorville Christians were a member of the Illinois–Missouri League, an American minor league baseball league. Future Baseball Hall of Famer Ray Schalk played on that team.

== Media ==
The town newspaper is the Breeze-Courier. The State Journal-Register, published in Springfield, Illinois, covers Taylorville and Christian County quite extensively. The Decatur, Illinois Herald & Review covers the area as well.

== Transportation ==
Taylorville is served by Illinois Route 29, Illinois Route 48 and Illinois Route 104. By closest major city, Illinois Route 29 connects Taylorville to Springfield, Illinois; Illinois Route 48 connects to Decatur, Illinois – including, from there, highway access to Pana, Illinois via US Highway 51 and to Champaign, Illinois via Interstate 72; and Illinois Route 104 connects Taylorville to Jacksonville, Illinois.

== Notable people ==
- Larry Bucshon – U.S. representative for Indiana
- John J. Bullington – Illinois state representative, soldier, and politician; lived and practiced law in Taylorville
- Jon Corzine – 54th Governor of New Jersey and United States Senator representing New Jersey
- Yvonne Craig – actress who appeared in season 3 of the 1960s Batman TV series as Batgirl; born in Taylorville
- Rodney Davis – Congressman, raised in Taylorville and graduated from Taylorville High School
- James H. Forrester – Illinois state senator, judge, and lawyer; lived and practiced law in Taylorville
- Harry B. Hershey – Illinois Supreme Court justice; lived in and served as mayor of Taylorville
- Randy Hopper – Wisconsin State Senator; born in Taylorville
- Vern Mullen – professional football player
- Johnny Orr – basketball player and coach; born in Taylorville
- Pat Perry – former MLB pitcher for the St. Louis Cardinals and the Chicago Cubs; born in Taylorville
- Edward Mills Purcell – winner of the Nobel Prize in Physics for discovery of nuclear magnetic resonance
- Doug Quick – weatherman, author and museum curator; born in Taylorville
- James B. Ricks – Illinois Supreme Court justice; served as mayor of Taylorville
- Jesse J. Ricks – attorney and Union Carbide executive; son of James B. Ricks
- Ruth Robertson – photojournalist; born in Taylorville
- Nook Schreier – musician and music director, born in Taylorville
- Joyce Taylor – 1960s film and television actress; born in Taylorville
- Rolland F. Tipsword – Illinois state representative, judge, and lawyer; lived and practiced law in Taylorville
- Stuart J. Traynor – Illinois state legislator and lawyer, lived and practiced law in Taylorville.
- Clifford J. Vogelsang – Illinois state senator, judge, and lawyer; lived and practiced law in Taylorville
