= James H. Forrester =

American lawyer, judge, and politician

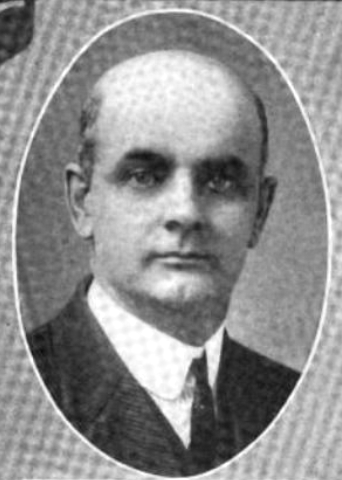

Member of the Illinois Senate
- In office 1920 – July 16, 1928

Personal details
- Born: James Henry Forrester; November 24, 1870 Christian County, Illinois
- Died: July 16, 1928 (aged 57) Owaneco, Illinois
- Party: Republican
- Education: Illinois State University; Wharton School of the University of Pennsylvania
- Occupation: Lawyer, politician

James Henry Forrester (November 24, 1870 – July 16, 1928) was an American lawyer, judge, and politician.

== Biography ==
Forester was born in Christian County, Illinois. He went to the public schools. In 1893, he graduated from Illinois State University in Normal, Illinois. Forrester then graduated from Wharton School of the University of Pennsylvania in 1895. Forrester was admitted to the Illinois bar in 1897. He practiced law in Decatur, Illinois. In 1898, he moved to Taylorville, Illinois and continued to practice law there until his death. He served as the Christian County Court Judge from 1902 to 1906 and was involved with the Republican Party. Forrester served in the Illinois Senate from 1921 until his death in 1928. Forrester died in his physician's office in Owaneco, Illinois after riding with friends.
