= Great Marlborough Street =

Street near Soho, London

Coordinates: 51°30′52″N 0°08′19″W

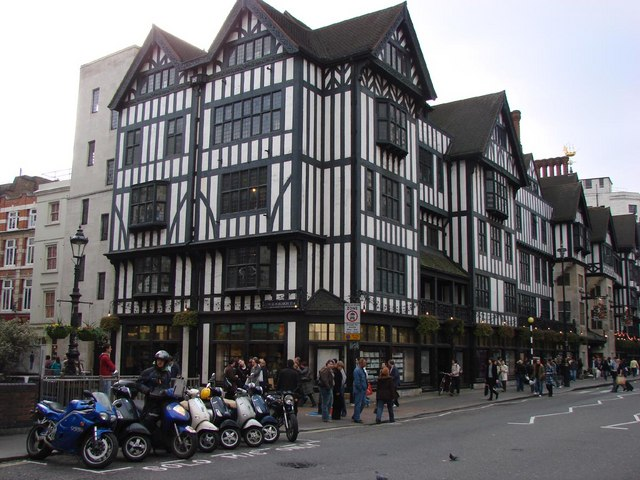
Liberty store on Great Marlborough Street

Great Marlborough Street is a thoroughfare in Soho, Central London. It runs east of Regent Street past Carnaby Street towards Noel Street.

Originally part of the Millfield estate south of Tyburn Road (now Oxford Street), the street was named after John Churchill, 1st Duke of Marlborough, and was laid out around 1704, the year of Marlborough's famous victory at the Battle of Blenheim. It was a fashionable address in the 18th century, but its character changed to commercial and retail use by the end of the 19th. Most of the street's original buildings have since been demolished. Great Marlborough Street has had an association with the law since the late-18th century; Marlborough Street Magistrates Court subsequently became one of the most important magistrates courts in London. The department store Liberty is on the corner of Great Marlborough Street with Regent Street and sports a Mock Tudor facade.

== Geography ==
The road is about 0.2 miles (0.32 km) long. At its western end it joins Regent Street and runs east, crossing Kingly Street, Argyll Street, Carnaby Street, and Poland Street. At its eastern end, it becomes Noel Street.

The nearest tube station is Oxford Circus to the northwest. No buses run along Great Marlborough Street but there are numerous services on Regent Street.

== History ==
=== 16th–18th centuries ===
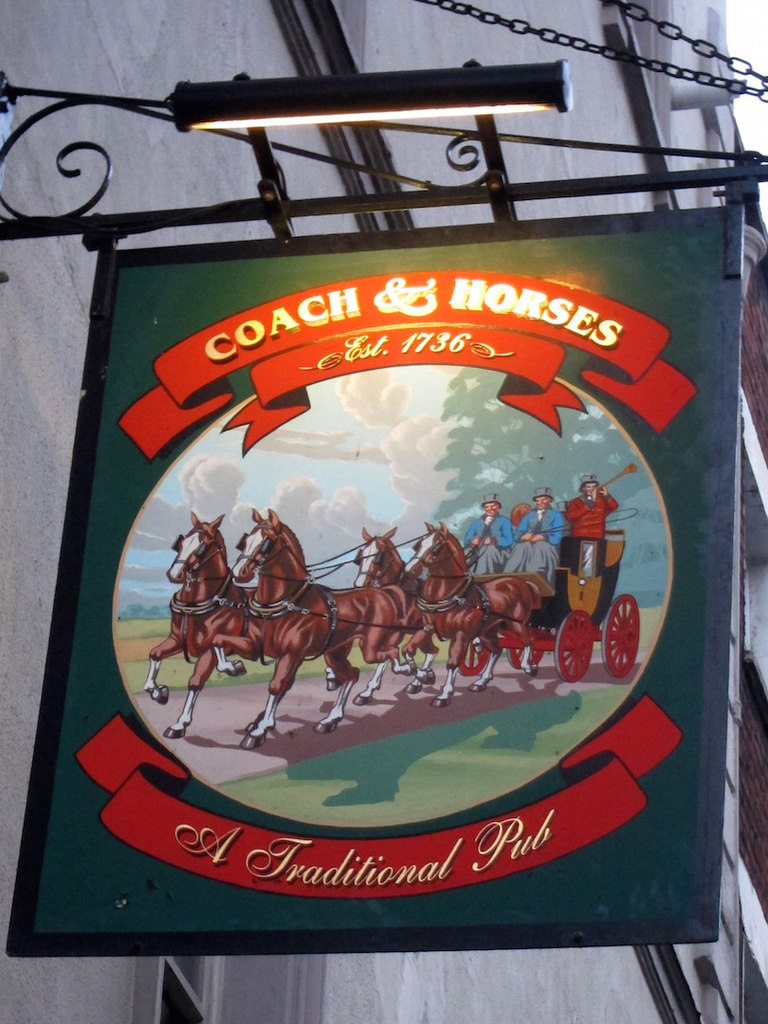
The Coach and Horses pub has been on Great Marlborough Street since the mid-18th century.

In the 16th century, what is now Great Marlborough Street was land belonging to the Mercers' Company. It was surrendered to Henry VIII in 1536. The land was subsequently owned by local brewer Thomas Wilson. His son, Richard, inherited this in 1622 who sold it to William Maddox, who called the estate Millfield. In 1670, Maddox's son, Benjamin, let the land to James Kendrick for 72 years, who in turn sub-let what is now Great Marlborough Street to John Steele. The land remained undeveloped, with building focusing on Tyburn Road (now Oxford Street) to the north.

The street began to be developed in the early 18th century, when Steele let five acres of land to Joseph Collens for property development. It was named after John Churchill, 1st Duke of Marlborough, commander of the English Army who won the Battle of Blenheim in 1704, shortly before construction started. Initially the street was a fashionable address; in 1714, John Macky said it "surpasses anything that is called a street" and praised its architecture. A 1734 report agreed it was popular but added "the buildings on each side being trifling and inconsiderable, and the vista ended neither way with any thing great or extraordinary".

Out of one hundred peers summoned before the King in 1716, five lived in Great Marlborough Street. For a time, Thomas Onslow, 2nd Baron Onslow, owned No. 11, while Richard Lumley, 1st Earl of Scarbrough, lived at No. 12. For a time in the 18th century, the street was the main London residence of Lord Nelson. No. 13 was formed of two separate houses, both leased by John Richmond in 1710 and subsequently joined as a single property. It was bought by Lord Charles Cavendish in 1740 and later occupied by his son, the scientist Henry Cavendish. Sir John Cust, 3rd Baronet, lived at No. 14 from 1754 to 1762. The Byron family were listed as ratepayers of No. 15 during the early 18th century. William Byron, 4th Baron Byron, lived here from 1727 until his death in 1736; his widow remained there until 1740. The Baron's son, William Byron, 5th Baron Byron, lived here from 1745 to 1774. The Scottish sculptor Thomas Campbell worked here from 1833 to 1843, also taking over the neighbouring No. 16. Sir Lambert Blackwell, 1st Baronet, bought No. 16 in September 1709 and stayed there until his death in 1727. His son, Sir Charles Blackwell, 2nd Baronet, subsequently lived in the house until he died in 1741. Mary Lepell, maid of honour to Caroline, Princess of Wales (and future wife of John Hervey, 2nd Baron Hervey), lived in part of a house which is now part of No. 34 from around 1716–1724. Sir John Cust, 3rd Baronet, Speaker of the House of Commons, lived in No. 41 (now No. 46) from 1747 to 1752. The first floor of the property was later occupied by the painter Benjamin Haydon from 1808 to 1817; Gilbert Stuart Newton is believed to have taken over his lodgings.

The French instrument builder Sébastien Érard moved into No. 18 in 1794. He stayed there until his death in 1831, after which his nephew, Pierre Erard took ownership of it and the adjoining No. 18, and rebuilt the two properties to have a uniform facade.

The Pantheon was based at the far eastern end of Great Marlborough Street. It was built on what had previously been gardens in 1772, becoming a popular place of entertainment during the late 18th century. The building burned down in 1792 and was rebuilt; it ceased to be an entertainment venue in 1818. It was later used as a bazaar in the mid-19th century before being demolished in 1937. The site is now the main Oxford Street branch of Marks and Spencer which has a side entrance onto Great Marlborough Street.

A number of pubs have been based on Great Marlborough Street for centuries. The Coach and Horses at No. 1 and the Marlborough Head at Nos. 37–38 were both established in the 1730s. However, most of the 18th century buildings on Great Marlborough Street were later demolished, which led to the decline of its reputation as a fashionable street.

=== 19th century ===
During the 19th century, various professionals such as architects and scientists were living in Great Marlborough Street. Thomas Hardwick lived here between 1815 and 1825, as did Charles Darwin between 1837 and 1838.

A police station was established at No. 21 Great Marlborough Street in 1793. This led to the establishment of Marlborough Street Magistrates Court at No. 20–21 in the early 19th century, which had become one of the most important magistrates courts in England by the end of the century. William Ewart Gladstone gave evidence in the court against a blackmailer who claimed Gladstone had frequented prostitutes in Leicester Square, while the Marquess of Queensberry's libel trial against Oscar Wilde took place here in 1895.

The Church of St John the Baptist was built on the site of the former Nos. 49–50 in 1885, and was consecrated on 23 November. The building cost £5,100 (now £566,612) and catered for services in the local parish that had previously been held in rooms or temporary buildings. The church covered a district between Oxford Street, Poland Street, Brewer Street, Bridle Lane, Carnaby Market and Argyll Street.

The London College of Music were based at No. 47 Great Marlborough Street from 1896 to 1990. Although it is one of the few 18th century buildings to survive, significant alterations have taken place, including being extended to cover four storeys. Since the college relocated, the building has been occupied by the London College of Beauty Therapy, the largest publicly funded college of its kind.

The street inspired the name of Philip Morris's Marlboro cigarettes. The original factory opened on the street in 1881.

=== 20th–21st centuries ===
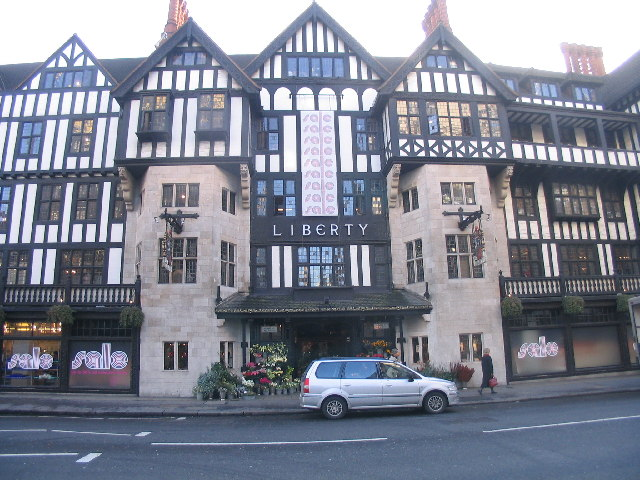
Arthur Lasenby Liberty built his eponymous department store in a Mock Tudor style.

In the early 20th century, a number of prominent automobile companies had showrooms on Great Marlborough Street. De Dion-Bouton, the largest automobile manufacturer in the world at the time, opened a London showroom at No. 10 in 1919. Charles Jarrott & Letts, Ltd (concessionaires for de Dietrich; Oldsmobile and Napier cars) was based at No. 45.

The department store Liberty is on the corner of Great Marlborough Street and Regent Street. The founder, Arthur Lasenby Liberty, was unable to expand or modernise the existing shop front due to Crown planning restrictions, so he bought numerous properties on Great Marlborough Street in 1925, and rebuilt them in a Mock Tudor design as an extension of the store. It was Grade II* listed in 1972. Palladium House was built on the corner of Great Marlborough Street and Argyll Street in 1928 by Raymond Hood and Gordon Jeeves. It featured an Art Deco design inspired by the Paris Exhibition of 1925 and was extended in 1935. It is now a Grade II listed building.

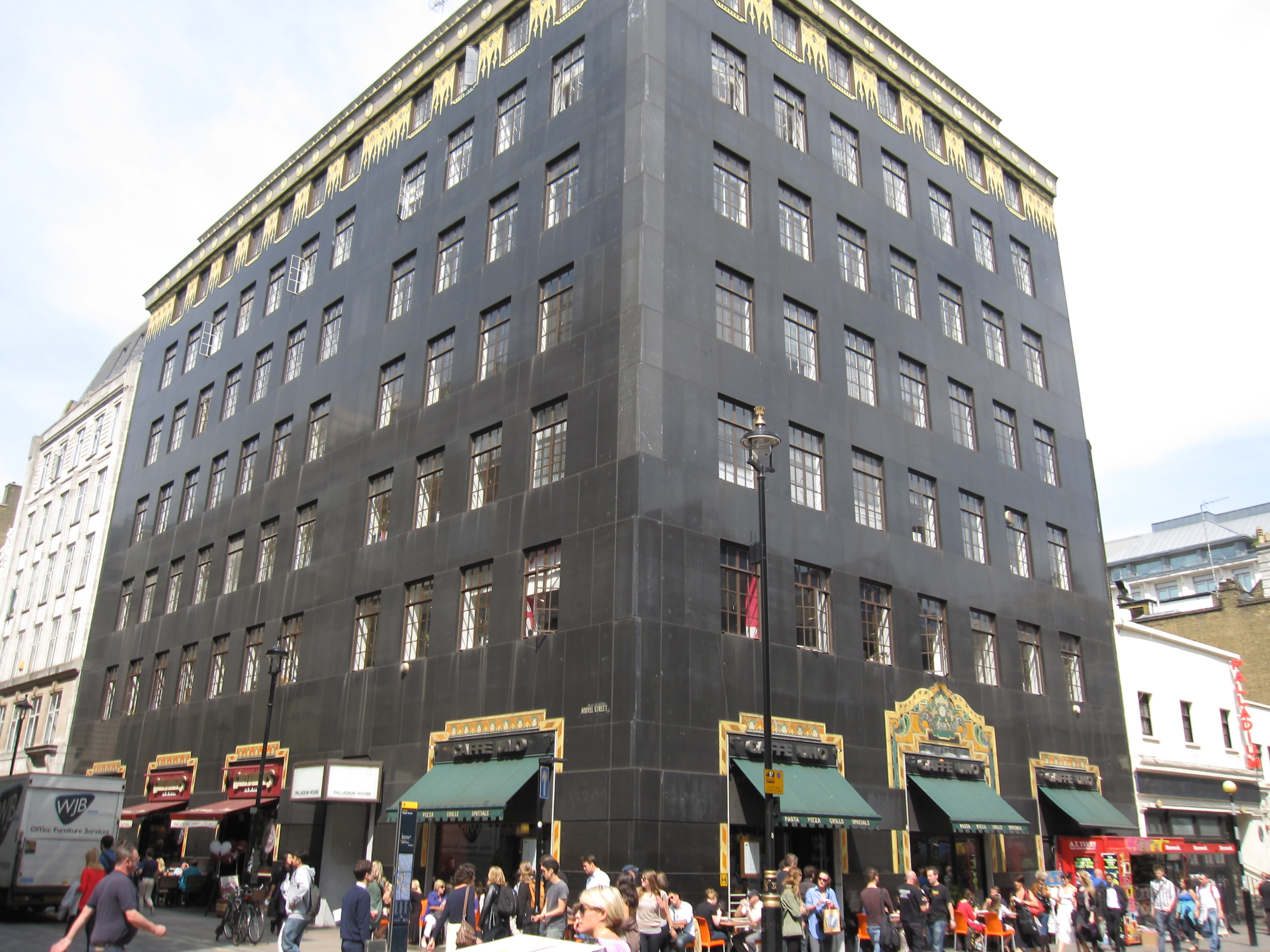
Palladium House, now Ideal House, London

The magistrates court continued to cover significant trials that were widely reported by the media. In 1963, Christine Keeler was tried here for attempting to obstruct the course of justice. In the late 1960s, a number of rock stars, including the Rolling Stones' Mick Jagger, Keith Richards and Brian Jones, stood trial on drugs offences at the magistrates court. Richards was tried here again in 1973 for possession of heroin and owning unlicensed firearms, but was only fined £205 (now £2,229). John Lennon and Yoko Ono were tried for obscenity here in 1970. The building became Grade II listed in 1970. The courts closed in 1998, and are now the Courthouse Hotel.

The European Headquarters of Sony Interactive Entertainment (PlayStation) is at No. 10 Great Marlborough Street. London Studio and Guerrilla Games also have London offices at this address. Creative consultants Collective UK, now a subdivision of Time Inc., have offices on Great Marlborough Street.

== Cultural references ==
Great Marlborough Street is shown on the British Monopoly board as "Marlborough Street". This is as a result of the square being named after Marlborough Street Magistrates Court; the other two orange property squares on the board are Bow Street (named after the Bow Street Runners) and Vine Street (named after the Vine Street Police Station), completing a set based around police and law. Marlboro Cigarettes were given its name due to the first shop opening on the Great Marlborough Street.

== See also ==
- List of eponymous roads in London
