= Bleecker Street Cinema =

Movie theater in New York City (1883–1991)

Coordinates: 40.72799°N 73.99943°W

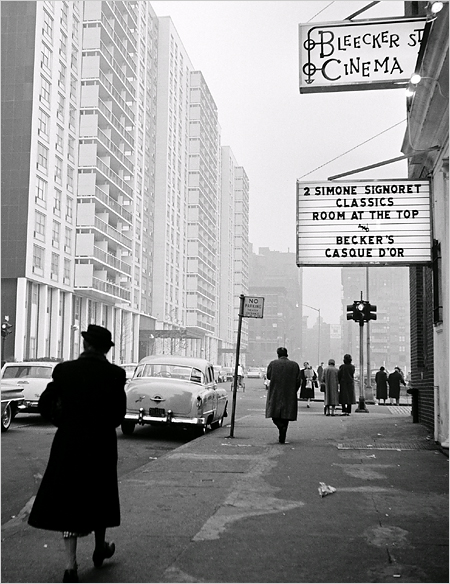
- Bleecker Street Cinema, looking east.
- Interactive map of Bleecker Street Cinema
- Former names: Mori (1883–1937); Montparnasse
- Address: 144 Bleecker Street; New York City, New York
- Location: 144 Bleecker Street; Manhattan, New York City, New York
- Owner: Placido Mori, New York University, Lionel Rogosin, Sid Geffen, Jackie Raynal, John Souto
- Capacity: 200
- Type: restaurant, art house movie theatre

Construction
- Built: 1832
- Opened: 1883
- Renovated: 1883, 1960
- Closed: September 2, 1991
- Architect: Raymond Hood

The Bleecker Street Cinema was an art house movie theater located at 144 Bleecker Street in Manhattan, New York City, New York. It became a landmark of Greenwich Village and an influential venue for filmmakers and cinephiles through its screenings of foreign and independent films. It closed in 1990, reopened as a gay adult theater for a short time afterward, then again briefly showed art films until closing for good in 1991.

== History ==
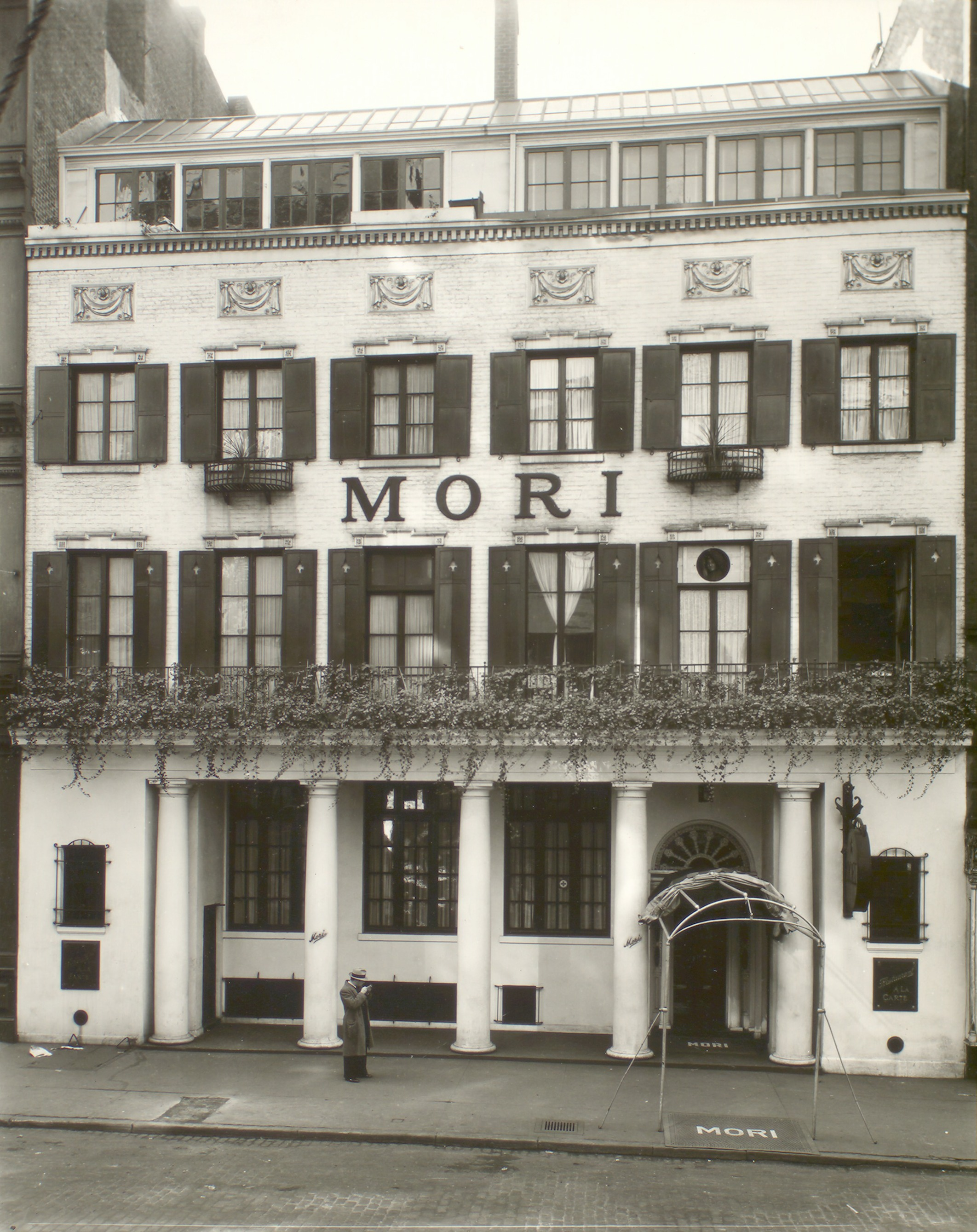
Mori Restaurant, 1935

The building at 144 Bleecker Street in Greenwich Village that would eventually house the Bleecker Street Cinema was originally built in 1832 as two rowhouses at 144 and 146 Bleecker Street. Placido Mori converted 144 into the restaurant Mori in 1883. As architecture historian Christopher Gray wrote:

At some point, [Placido] Mori befriended a novice architect, Raymond Hood, gave him a house tab and an apartment upstairs and in 1920 had him design a new facade for the building to include 146 Bleecker. Hood gave the buildings a row of Doric columns across the first floor, imitation Federal lintels over the windows and a setback penthouse studio.

Mori closed in 1937. The building remained unoccupied until 1944 when political and activist organizations including Free World House headquartered there for two years. Sometime afterward, the space became the Restaurant Montparnasse. By 1959, the building was owned by New York University.

Filmmaker and social activist Lionel Rogosin founded the 200-seat Bleecker Street Cinema in 1960 in order to exhibit his controversial 1959 film Come Back, Africa. In the early 1960s, the independent-filmmakers' group The Film-Makers' Cooperative, of which Rogosin was a supporter, showed experimental movies there as midnight screenings. Soon the venue became, in the words of film critic and historian James Hoberman, one of "three key revival houses: The New Yorker, the Bleecker Street [Cinema], and the Thalia", in New York City during the 1950s and 1960s.

Film critic Rudy Franchi, at one time the theater's program director, recalled that the house cat, Breathless, named for that Godard film, would often "escape from the office area and start to climb the movie screen. ... I would sometimes get a buzz on the house phone from the projection booth with the terse message 'Cat's on the screen.'" The theater cat at the venue's 1990 closing was named Wim, after director Wim Wenders.

Sid Geffen purchased the theater in 1973 or 1974, and ran it with his wife, then named Jackie Raynal. That same year, Geffen bought the Carnegie Hall Cinema, housed underground beneath the famed music hall. Future October Films co-founder and United Artists studio executive Bingham Ray began his film career in 1981 as a manager and programmer at the theater, and longtime Film Forum programmer and film historian Bruce Goldstein had his first New York theater job at Geffen's two venues. Geffen died in 1986.

Bleecker Street Cinema, 1980s

In 1990, his widow, by then remarried and named Jackie Raynal-Sarré, said that because Geffen left no will, she partnered with developer John Souto to buy out Geffen's children from a previous marriage. She further said that Souto, after renting to her for four years for $160,000 annually, raised the rent to $275,000, more than the theater could sustain. Following a lawsuit and court proceedings, a judge ordered the two co-owners to bid on the building. "We came in with [a] $3.3 million [bid] and he came in with $3.4 million," Raynal-Sarré said. In its final configuration, it had a main auditorium of 171 seats, and the 78-seat James Agee Room.

The theater closed on September 6, 1990. The last film to start was Aki Kaurismäki's 74-minute Ariel, and the last film to end was the nearly two-hour Jesus of Montreal. The last film in the James Agee Room was Roger Stigliano's Fun Down There.

By November of that year, Bleecker Street Cinema had reopened as a gay adult-film theater. Some time afterward it returned to its art-house roots, but then closed for good on Monday night, September 2, 1991. Its final features were Alex van Warmerdam's Dutch comedy Voyeur; the documentary Jimi Hendrix at the Isle of Wight; Ari Roussimof's war-veteran drama Shadows in the City; and Francis Teri's horror movie Suckling. The theater's final operator was Nick Russo Nicolaou.

== Influence and legacy ==
The foreign and independent-film programming of the Bleecker Street Cinema helped inspire future filmmakers and contributed to the cinematic education of film historians, critics and academics. As one historian wrote:

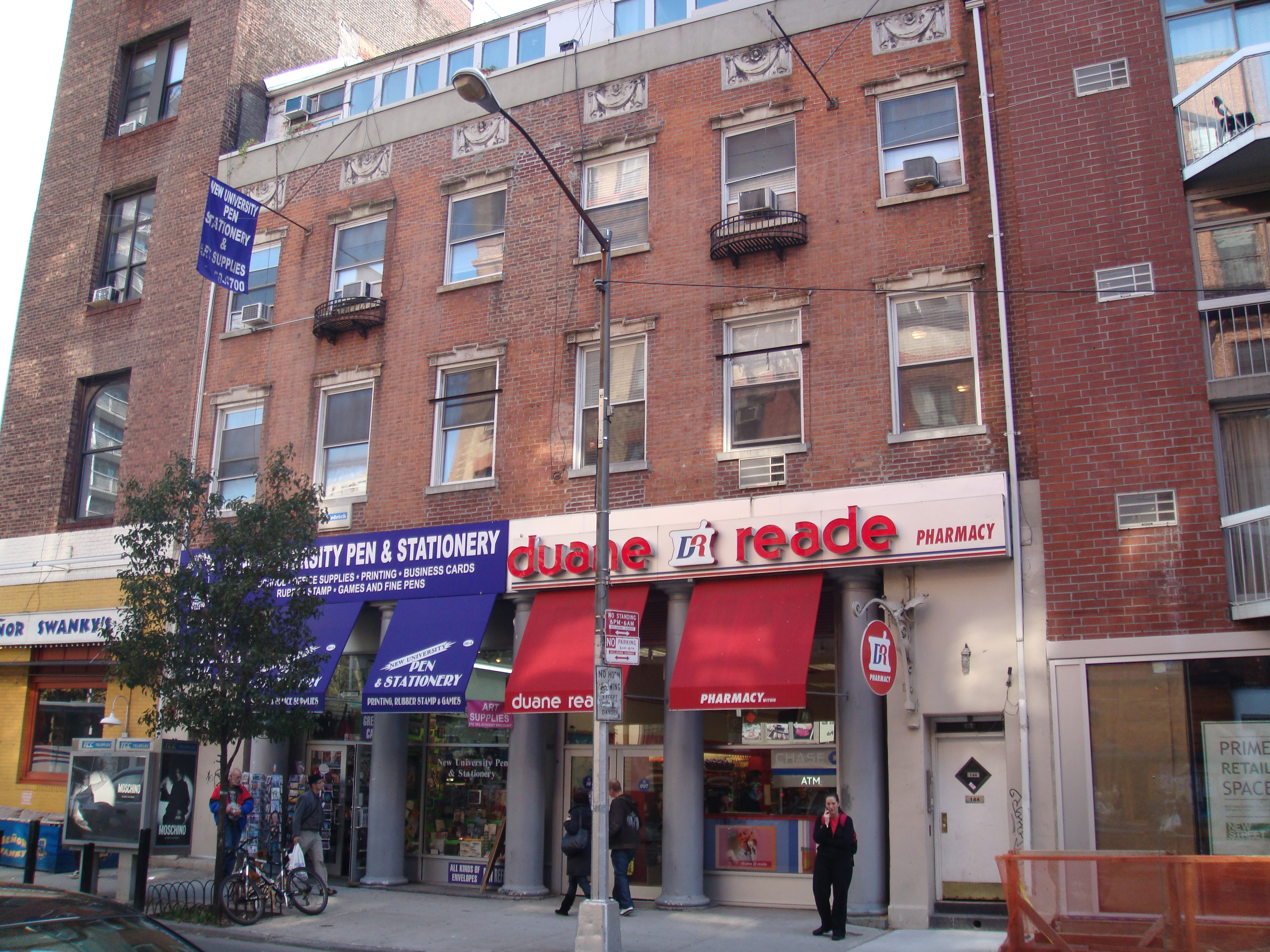
Former Bleecker Street Cinema site, October 2008

Sid Geffen was one of a series of men who made a huge difference in film history through their exhibition choices in New York City. Geffen, who ran the Bleecker Street Cinema in the crucial years of the late seventies and early eighties, along with Amos Vogel and Fabiano Canosa, significantly affected the course of film history.

== In popular culture ==
Several scenes in Desperately Seeking Susan (1985) were shot at the Bleecker Street Cinema, as one of the characters (Dez, played by Aidan Quinn) works there as a projectionist. In Woody Allen's 1989 Crimes and Misdemeanors, the character played by filmmaker-star Allen visits the Bleecker Street Cinema to see Alfred Hitchcock's Mr. and Mrs. Smith and the 1943 musical Happy Go Lucky. It also appears in the films The Prince of Tides and Maniac Cop.

== See also ==
- 55th Street Playhouse—another Manhattan theater which showed art-house films
- Film Forum
- IFC Center
- New Andy Warhol Garrick Theatre—nearby at 152 Bleecker Street (until 1970s)
- Quad Cinema
