= Ideal House, London =

Palladium House
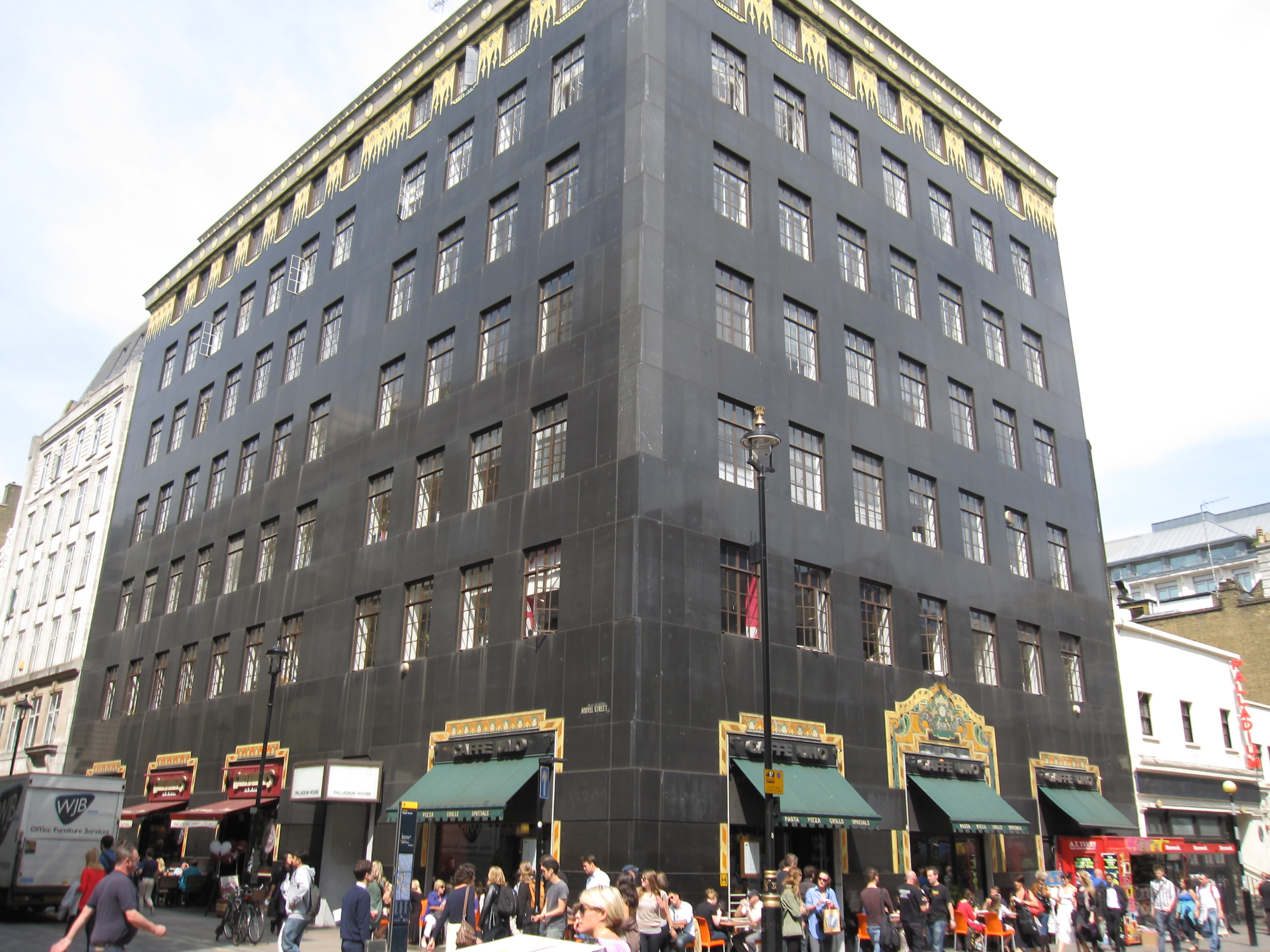
- Street view of the building
- Interactive map of the Palladium House area
- Former names: Ideal House

General information
- Location: Corner of Great Marlborough Street and Argyll Street, London, United Kingdom
- Coordinates: 51.514°N 0.140°W
- Completed: 1929

Height
- Architectural: Art Deco

Technical details
- Floor count: 7

Design and construction
- Architects: Raymond Hood, Gordon Jeeves

Listed Building – Grade II
- Official name: Palladium House
- Designated: 16 January 1991
- Reference no.: 1357168

Palladium House, formerly known as Ideal House, is a grade II listed Art Deco office building located on the corner of Great Marlborough Street and Argyll Street in London.

== History and description ==
The building was designed in by architects Raymond Hood and Gordon Jeeves in the art deco style as the London headquarters of the National Radiator Company (European subsidiary of the American Radiator Company). Its design was a scaled down version of the American Radiator Building, New York.

Built 1928–9, the building is a seven-storey office block, with black granite facing decorated with an inlaid champlevé design with Egyptian influences. The building was extended in 1935.

In 1981, it was declared a Grade II Listed Building.

Architectural details
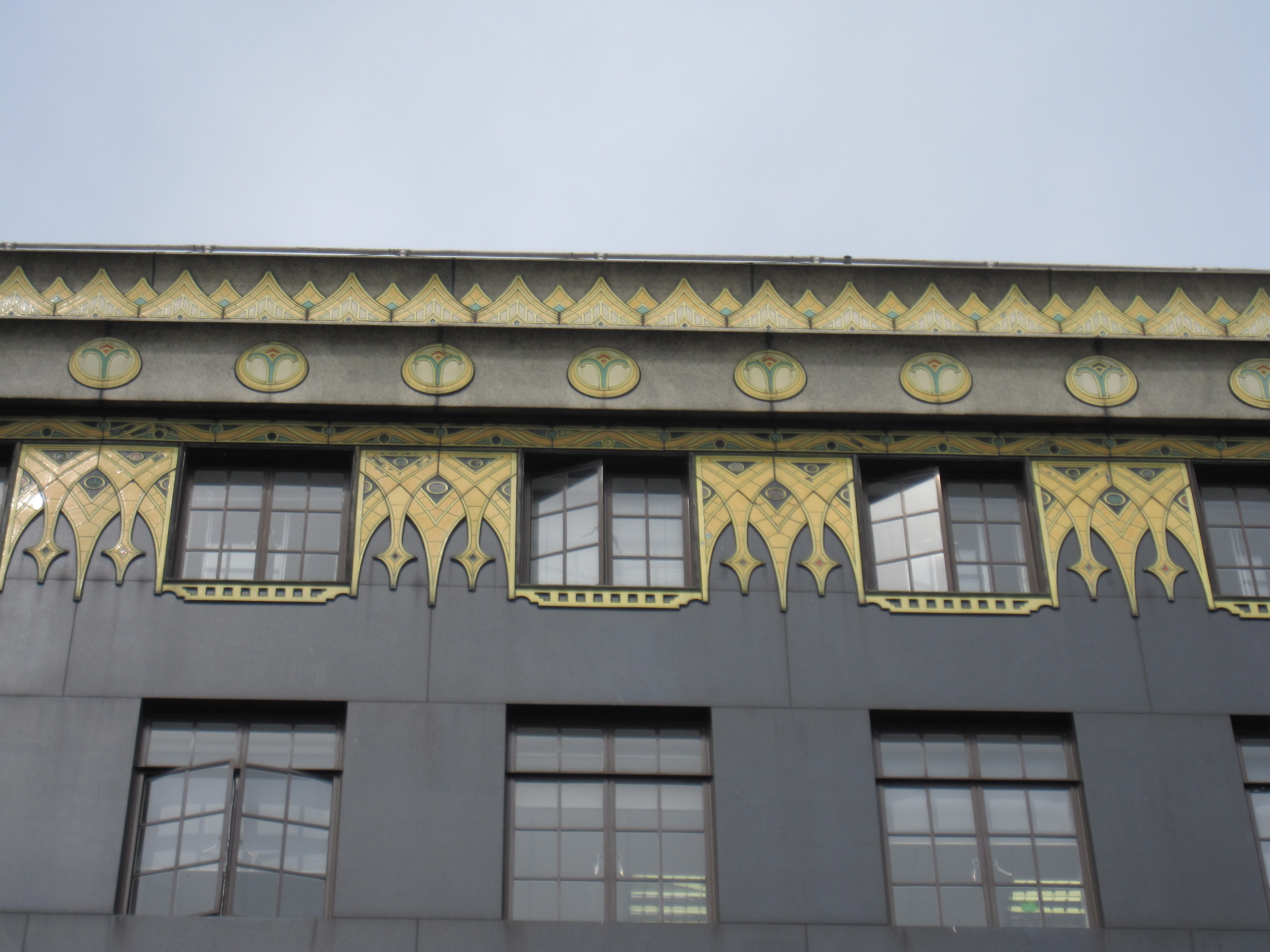
Decorated cornice

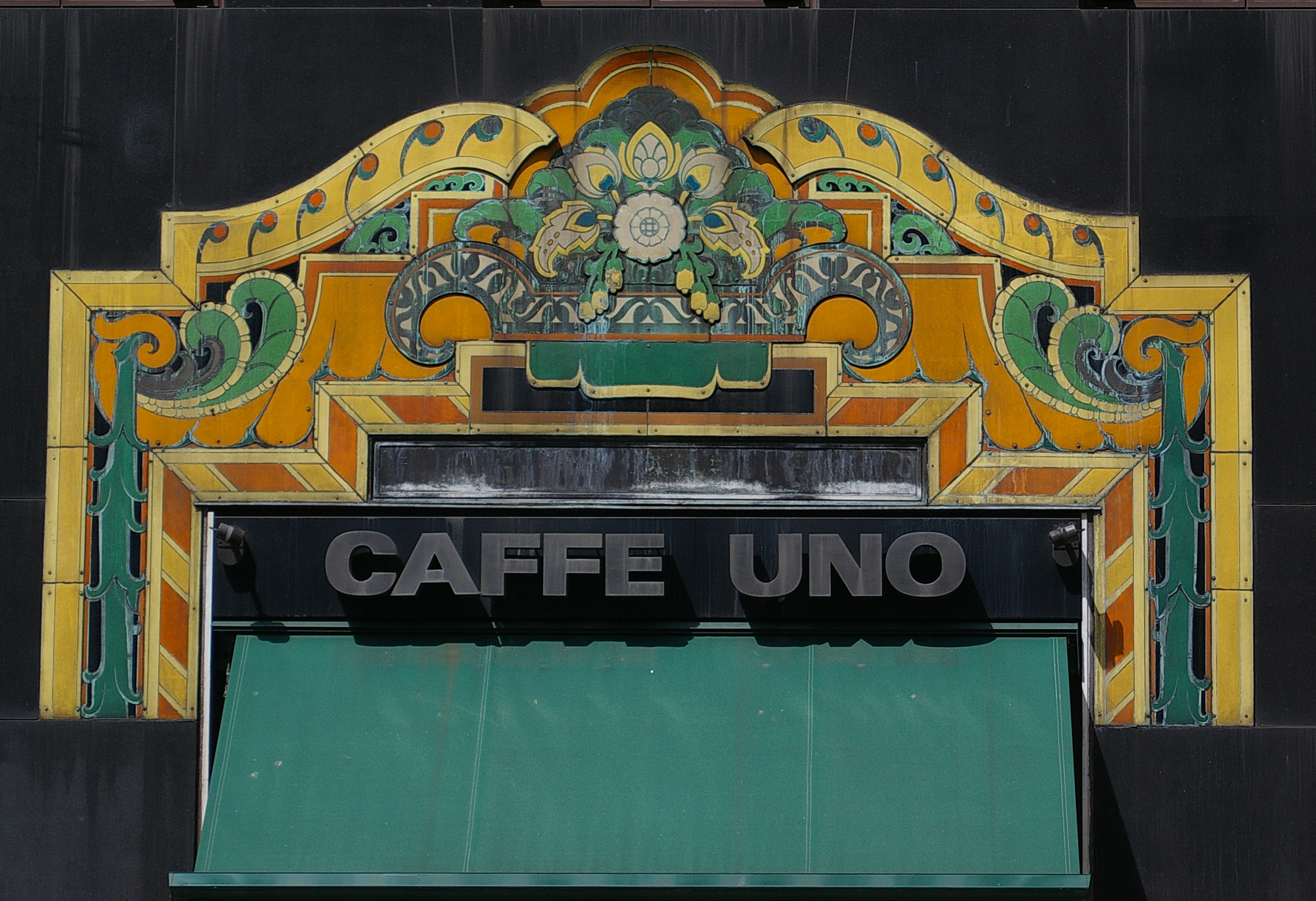
Main entrance decoration (2009)
