= Mori (New York City restaurant) =

Italian restaurant in Manhattan, New York

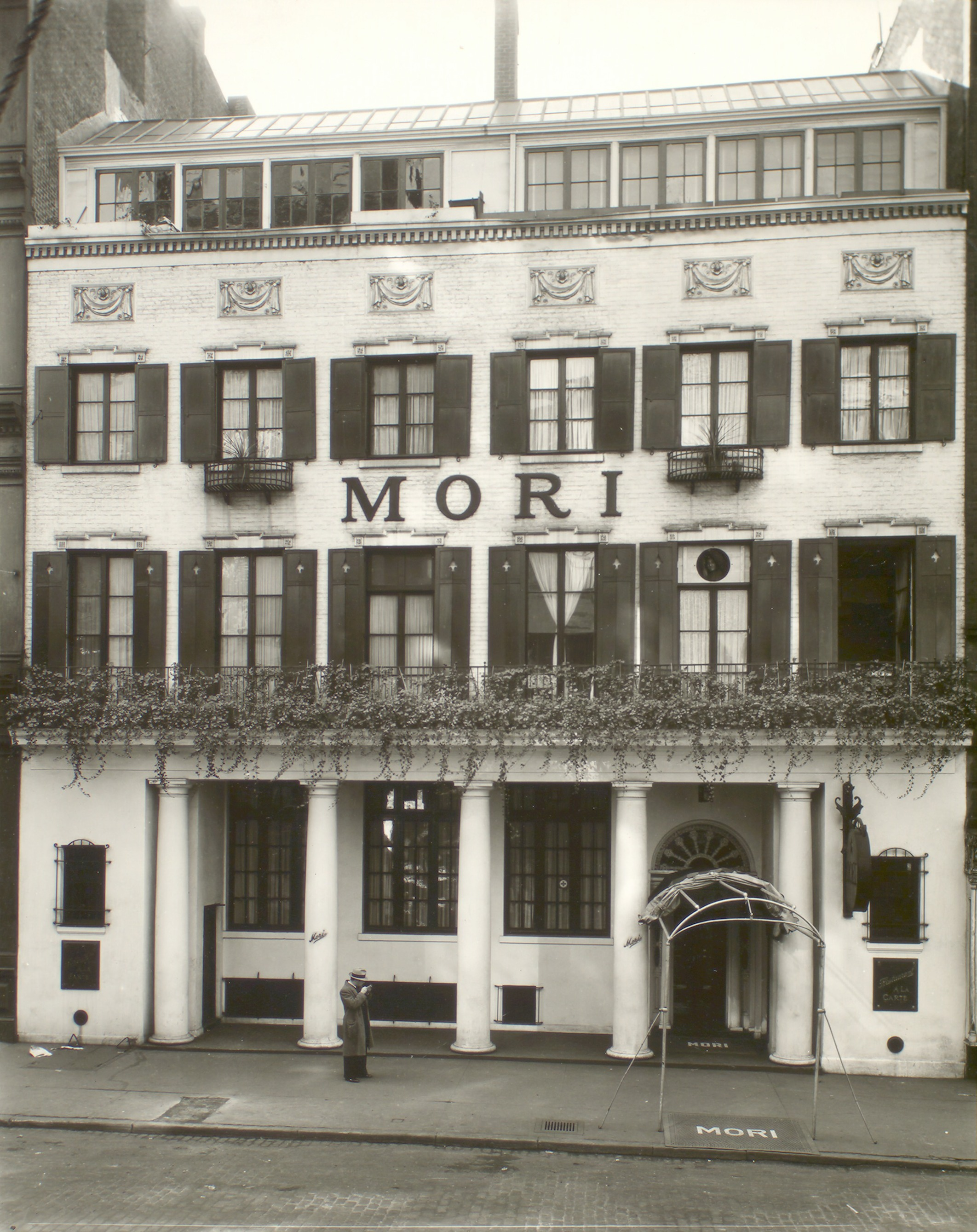
- Mori's Restaurant (1935)
- Interactive map of Mori
- Address: 144 Bleecker Street, New York City, New York
- Coordinates: 40°43′41.2″N 73°59′57.6″W
- Owner: Placido Mori
- Type: restaurant, art house movie theatre

Construction
- Built: 1832
- Opened: 1883
- Renovated: 1883
- Closed: 1937
- Architect: Raymond Hood

Mori (1883–1937) was a restaurant in the Greenwich Village neighborhood of Manhattan in New York City. The restaurant, which served Italian cuisine, went bankrupt after the Great Depression. Its building later housed the Bleecker Street Cinema.

== History ==
The building at 144–146 Bleecker Street in New York City's Greenwich Village was originally built in 1832 as two rowhouses. Placido Mori converted 144 into the restaurant Mori in 1883 or 1884. As architecture historian Christopher Gray wrote,

At some point, Mori befriended a novice architect, Raymond Hood, gave him a house tab and an apartment upstairs and in 1920 had him design a new facade for the building to include 146 Bleecker. Hood gave the buildings a row of Doric columns across the first floor, imitation Federal lintels over the windows and a setback penthouse studio.

The restaurant began as a small bar and eatery and expanded to fully occupy a "rambling, old-fashioned" five-story building near Sixth Avenue. It survived the Prohibition era and the worst years of the Great Depression, when it was temporarily padlocked.

Mori closed in 1937, and Placido Mori filed a petition for bankruptcy in early January 1938, stating that the corporation had no assets and liabilities totaling $70,000. The building formerly occupied by Mori was sold by Caroline Bussing through A.Q. Orza, broker, in October 1943.

Mori's gravesite in Woodlawn Cemetery in the Bronx is marked with a sculpted memorial designed by Hood and sculptor Charles Keck.
