= Ocean Forest Hotel =

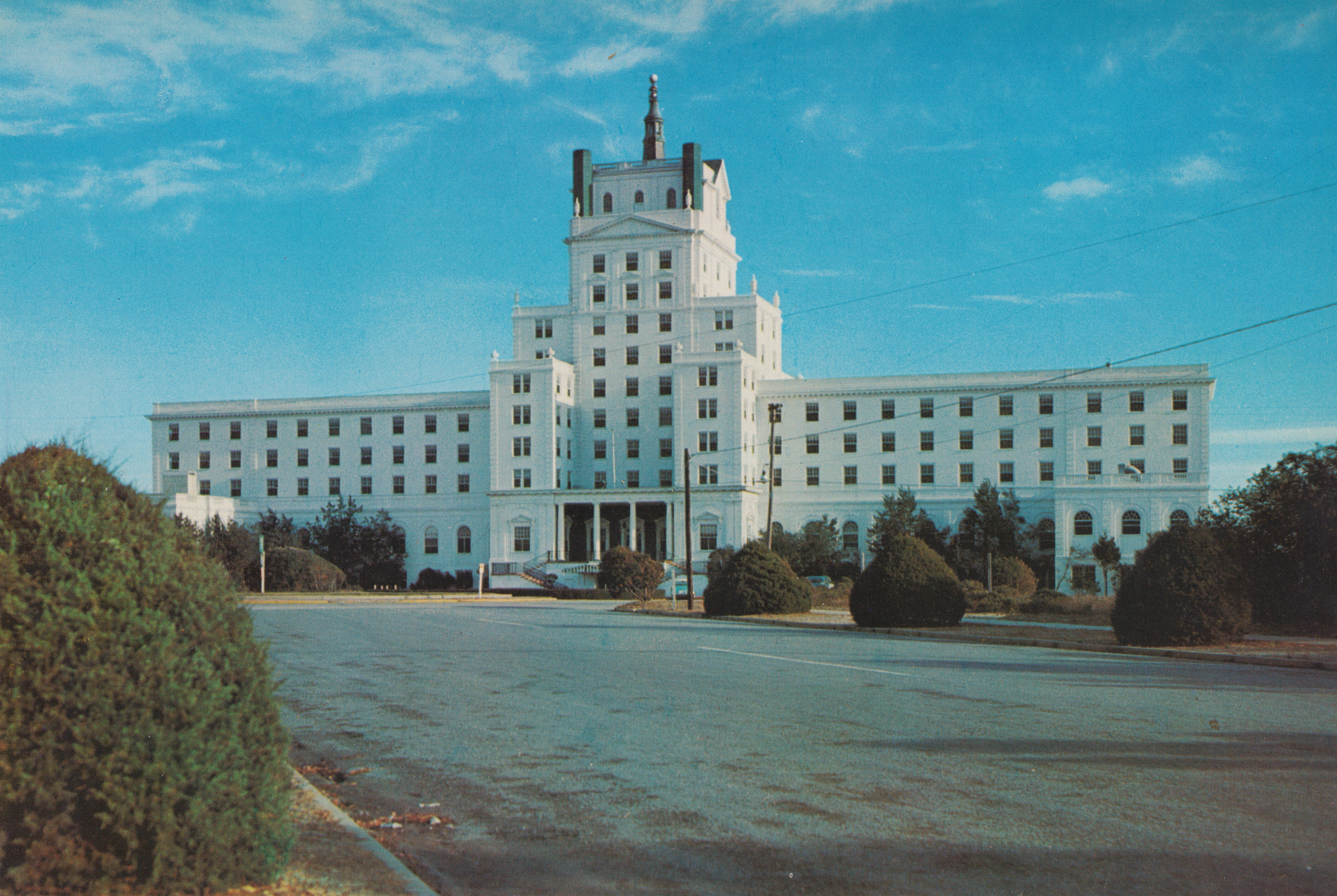

- Location within South Carolina

General information
- Status: Demolished
- Type: Hotel
- Architectural style: Neoclassical
- Location: Myrtle Beach, South Carolina, United States of America
- Coordinates: 33°43′46.38″N 78°50′6.73″W
- Opened: 21 February 1930
- Demolished: 13 September 1974
- Cost: $1 million in 1929

Technical details
- Floor count: 10

Design and construction
- Architect: Raymond Hood

The Ocean Forest Hotel was one of the first major hotels in Myrtle Beach, South Carolina, U.S.A. The Ocean Forest and the adjoining Ocean Forest Country Club and Golf Course were the vision of John T. Woodside, a textile magnate from Greenville, South Carolina. Woodside's company purchased 65,000 acres (260,000,000 m^{2}) from the Myrtle Beach Farms Company, which included the land for the hotel along the oceanfront. Woodside completed the golf course and country club in 1928, and turned attention to building a hotel catering to upper-class clientele.

Designed by Raymond Hood, the architect of New York's Rockefeller Center, the Ocean Forest was completed and formally opened on February 21, 1930. It cost approximately $1 million to build, and featured a ten-story main tower with two five-story wings. This hotel was different from all other existing hotels in Myrtle Beach, with many ornate features like marble columns, crystal chandeliers, large ballrooms and elevators. The hotel property covered 13 acres (53,000 m^{2}) including gardens, stables and pools. It stood oceanfront near present-day Porcher Drive.

Upon completion, Woodside was unable to make the mortgage payments, having lost most of his fortune during the stock market crash of 1929. The hotel, country club and surrounding property were all foreclosed upon by Woodside's bank, Iselin and Company of New York, and remained in their hands for several years. A group of independent investors purchased the hotel and country club, but much of the land was ultimately repossessed by the Myrtle Beach Farms Company.

Located halfway between New York City and Miami, the Ocean Forest was considered "the Grand Central Station of the area".

After World War II, the hotel did not receive the required maintenance and upkeep.

Niles "Sonny" Stevens and Dexter Stuckey bought the hotel in 1973. The 10-acre site was worth $7.5 million but the purchase price was not made public. The owners began selling items from the hotel. The lighthouse that once stood on top later became part of Family Kingdom Amusement Park. The cost of operating the Ocean Forest was too high and, a Sun News article from the time said, it was "unable to meet the requirements of its insurers".

The hotel was imploded on Friday September 13, 1974 to make way for a condominium development. Only a roundabout remains today where the entrance to the hotel once stood with roads extending towards present-day Pine Lakes Country Club, the former Ocean Forest Country Club and Golf Course.

A beach house from the original project was moved to Springmaid Beach and became Franklin G. Burroughs-Simeon B. Chapin Art Museum. Ocean Forest Villas stands on the site today.
