= Raymond Hood =

American architect (1881–1934)

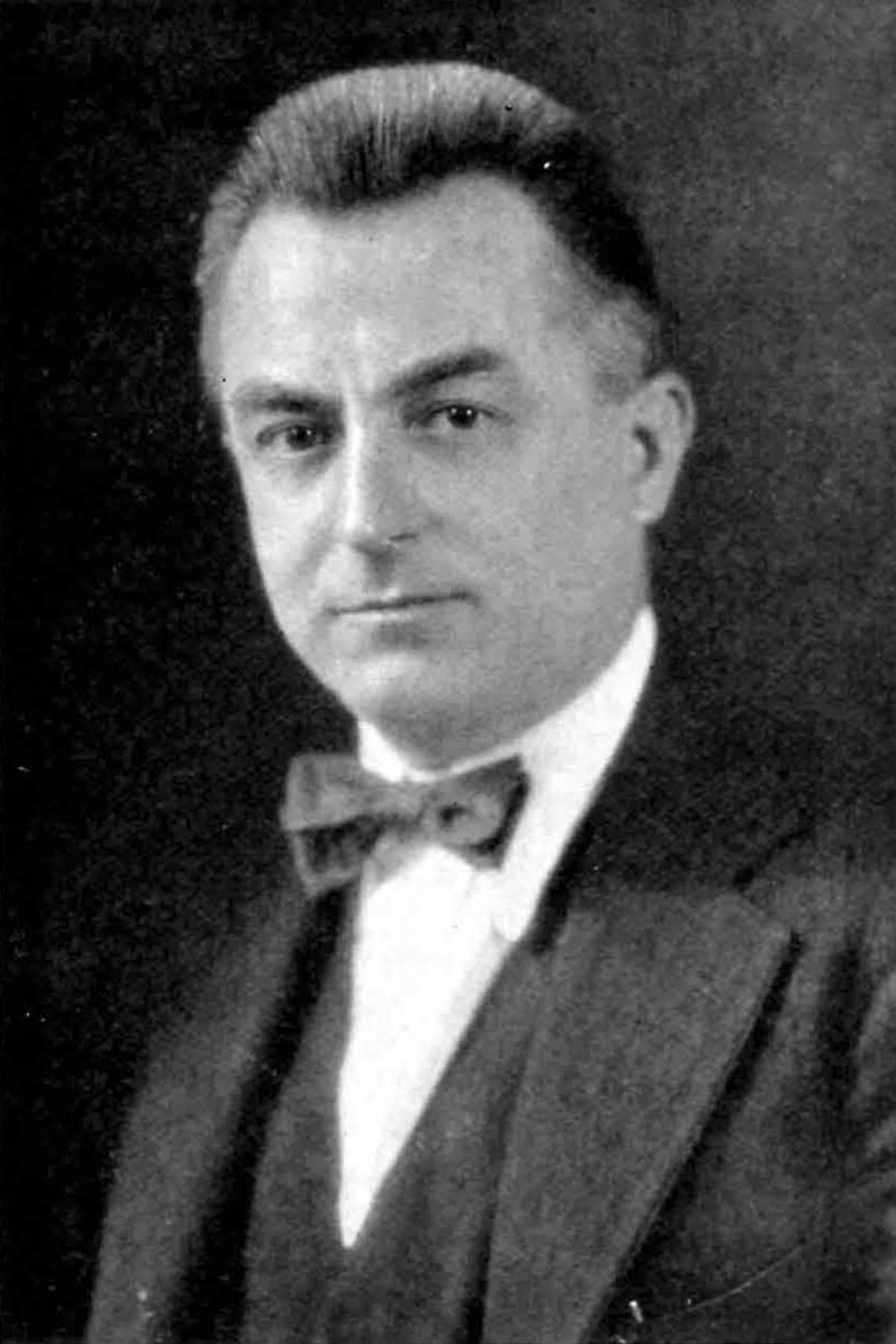
- Born: March 29, 1881; Pawtucket, Rhode Island
- Died: August 14, 1934 (aged 53); Stamford, Connecticut
- Education: Brown University; MIT; École des Beaux-Arts
- Occupation: Architect
- Buildings: Tribune Tower, 330 West 42nd Street, Rockefeller Center, Daily News Building

Raymond Mathewson Hood (March 29, 1881 – August 14, 1934) was an American architect who worked in the Neo-Gothic and Art Deco styles. He is best known for his designs of the Tribune Tower, American Radiator Building, and Rockefeller Center. Through a short yet highly successful career, Hood exerted an outsized influence on twentieth-century architecture.

== Early life and education ==
=== Early life ===
Raymond Mathewson Hood was born in Pawtucket, Rhode Island on March 29, 1881, to John Parmenter Hood and Vella Mathewson. John Hood was the owner of J.N. Polsey & Co., a crate and box manufacturing company. The family lived at 107 Cottage Street in a house designed by John Hood and local architect Albert H. Humes. In a 1931 profile of Hood in The New Yorker, writer Allene Talmey described the Hood home as "the ugliest place in town." In 1893, the Hood family visited the World’s Columbian Exposition in Chicago. This experience may have sparked Hood's interest in architecture.

=== Education ===
In 1898, Hood graduated from Pawtucket High School. Later that year, Hood enrolled at Brown University. At Brown, he studied mathematics, rhetoric, French, and drawing. In 1899, seeking more opportunities to pursue an architectural education, Hood enrolled at the Massachusetts Institute of Technology.

At MIT, Hood studied under Constant-Désiré Despradelle, a prominent proponent of the Beaux-Arts style. Hood excelled at creating meticulously rendered architectural drawings, and after graduating worked as a draftsman for Cram, Goodhue and Ferguson. During his time at Cram, Goodhue and Ferguson, Hood purportedly worked on the 1899 design of the Classical Revival Deborah Cook Sayles Public Library.

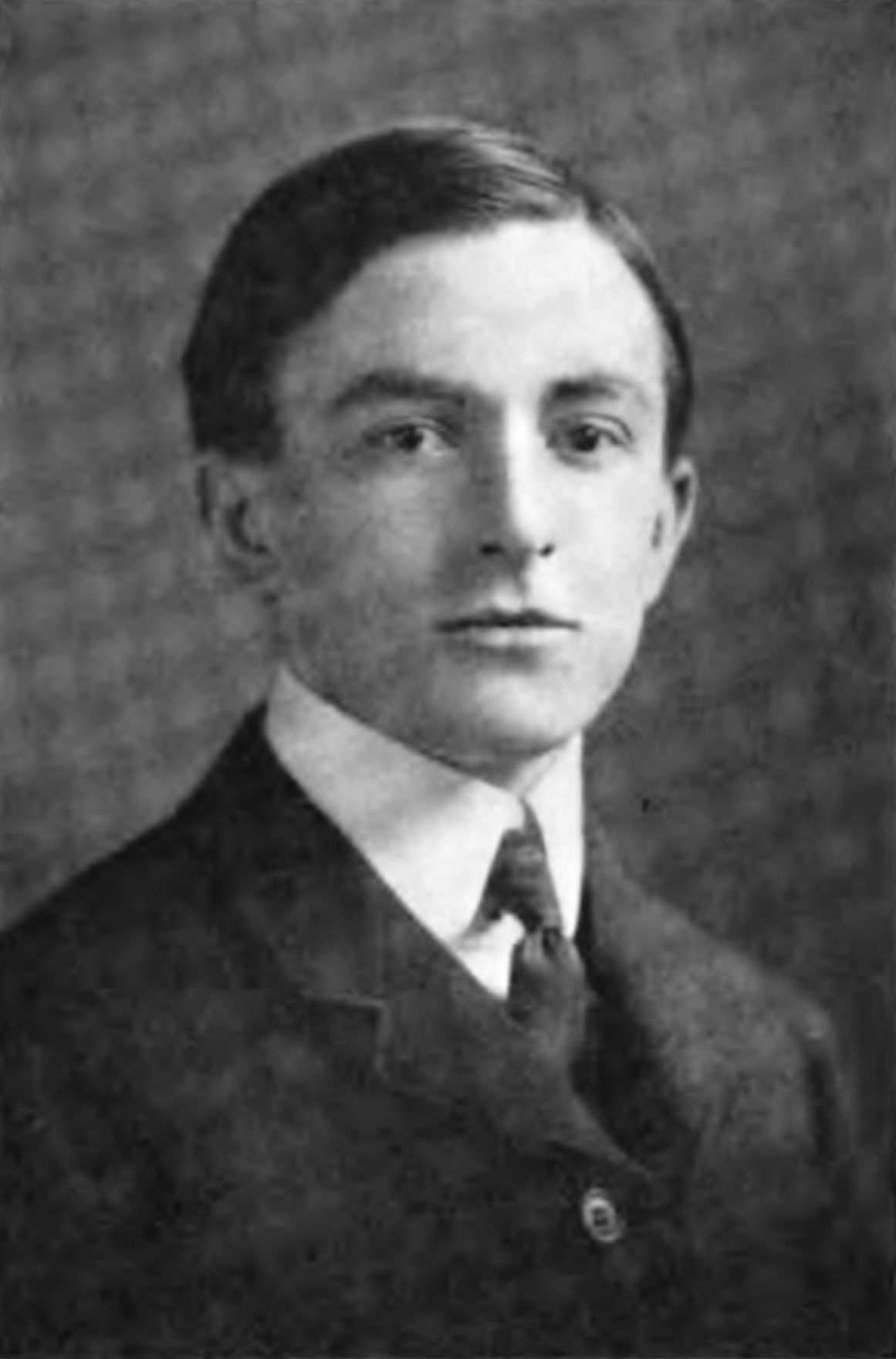
Hood in 1906

In June 1904, Hood returned to Pawtucket before leaving for Europe with the intention of studying at the École des Beaux-Arts in Paris. Hood failed his first attempt at the entrance exam in October 1904, but was accepted after his second attempt in 1905. His capstone diplôme project at the École was a city hall for Pawtucket, his hometown. The project, which was never realized, fused classical features with modern technology.

== Career ==
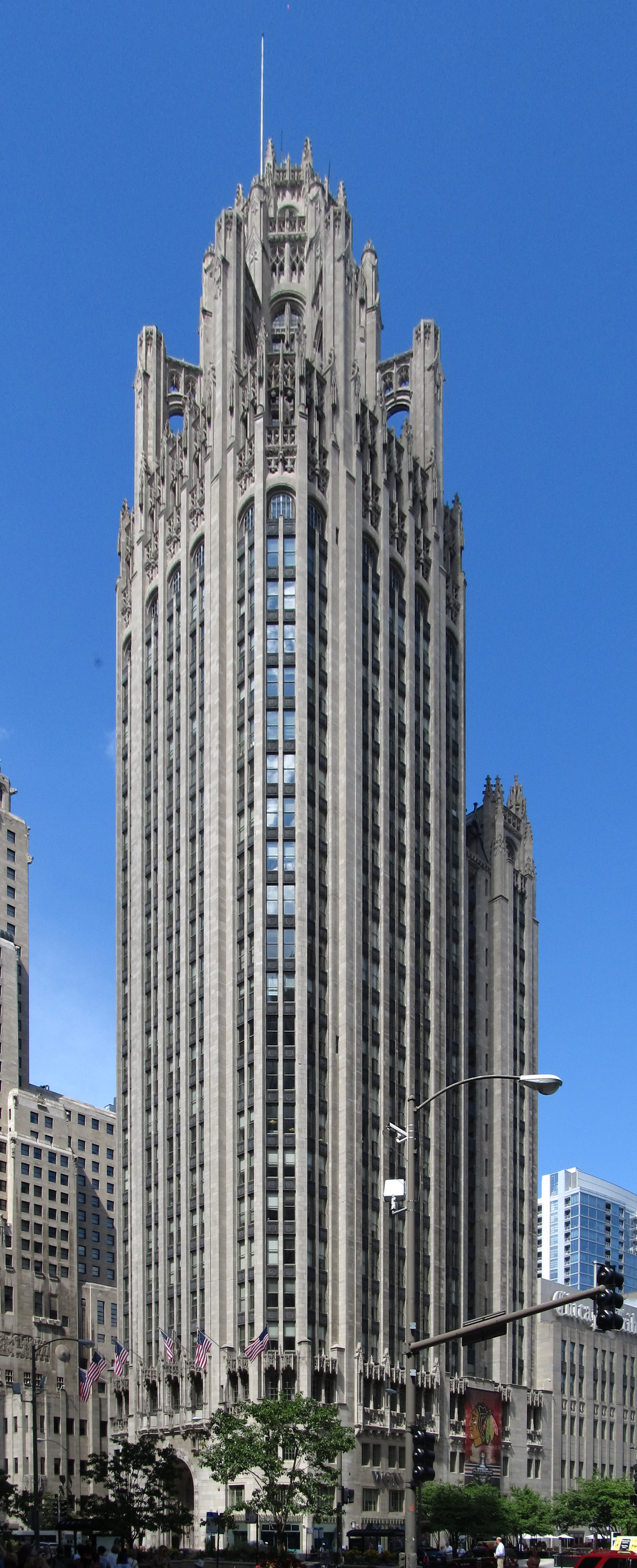
The Tribune Tower in Chicago (1924) references the Rouen Cathedral

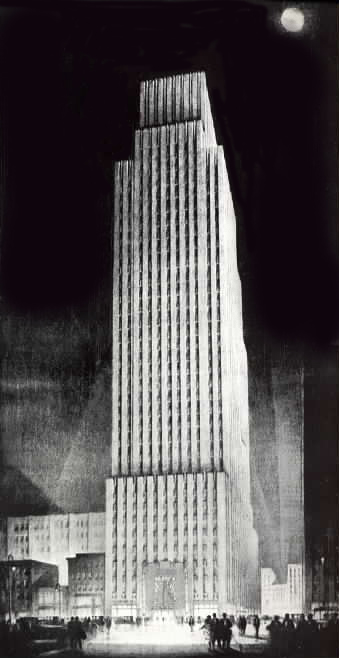
The Daily News Building in Manhattan (1929), rendering by Hugh Ferriss

In 1911, Hood returned to the US, taking a job at the office of Henry Hornbostel in Pittsburgh.

In 1916, Hood designed an ambitious plan for downtown Providence; the project's defining feature was a 600 feet (180 m) civic tower, whose pedimented base occupied the entire southern edge of Exchange Place. The plan, which was likewise never realized, was published in The Providence Journal under the headline "A Striking Plan for Dignifying Civic Centre."

=== Chicago Tribune Tower ===
In 1922, New York architect John Mead Howells, who had met him at the École des Beaux-Arts, invited Hood to become his partner in the Chicago Tribune building competition in which Howells had been invited to compete. The neo-Gothic design submitted by Howells and Hood won the competition, beating the designs of prominent competitors, including Eliel Saarinen, Walter Gropius, and Adolf Loos.

The design proved pivotal in Hood's career, catalyzing his emergence as a preeminent architect of the era.

=== American Radiator Building ===
Among the commissions received by Hood in the immediate wake of his design for the Tribune Tower was a design for a new New York office tower for the American Radiator Company. In his 1924 design for the building, produced in collaboration with architect Jacques André Fouilhoux, Hood moved towards a looser interpretation of Gothic architecture, cladding the structure in black brick. The design was additionally noted for its revolutionary use of lighting. According to art and architectural historian Dietrich Neumann, the design "helped to introduce a new age of color and light in American architecture."

== Approach ==
Hood did not consider himself an artist, but saw himself as "manufacturing shelter", writing:

There has been entirely too much talk about the collaboration of architect, painter and sculptor; nowadays, the collaborators are the architects, the engineer, and the plumber. ... Buildings are constructed for certain purposes, and the buildings of today are more practical, from the standpoint of the man who is in them than the older buildings. ... We are considering effort and convenience much more than appearance or effect.

Hood's design theory was aligned with that of the Bauhaus, in that he valued utility as beauty:

Beauty is utility, developed in a manner to which the eye is accustomed by habit, in so far as this development does not detract from its quality of usefulness.

Despite this paean to utility, Hood's designs featured non-utilitarian aspects such as roof gardens, polychromy, and Art Deco ornamentation. As much as Hood might insist that his designs were largely determined by the practicalities of zoning laws and the restraints of economics, each of his major buildings was different enough to suggest that Hood's design artistry was a significant factor in the final result.

While a student at the École des Beaux-Arts, Hood met John Mead Howells, with whom he later partnered. Hood frequently employed architectural sculptor Rene Paul Chambellan both for architectural sculptures for his building and to make plasticine models of his projects. Hood is believed to have coined the term "Architecture of the Night" in a 1930 pamphlet published by General Electric.

Hood died at age 53 due to arthritis and was interred at Sleepy Hollow Cemetery in Sleepy Hollow, New York.

== Influence ==
Hood's buildings were featured in works by Georgia O'Keeffe (Radiator Building—Night, New York, 1927), Diego Rivera (Frozen Assets, 1931), Berenice Abbott (McGraw-Hill Building, 1936; Fortieth Street between Fifth and Sixth Avenue, 1938), and Samuel Gottscho (Rockefeller Center and RCA Building from 515 Madison Ave, 1933).

== Works ==
=== Built works ===
- John Green Residence, New York, NY, 1920; alteration to an existing apartment building
- Mori, New York, NY, 1920; Hood designed a new facade for a restaurant that had opened in 1883
- St. Vincent de Paul Asylum, Tarrytown, NY, 1924; with J. André Fouilhoux
- Tribune Tower, Chicago, IL, 1924
- Raymond Hood House, Stamford, CT, 1924
- American Radiator Building, New York, NY, 1924
- Bethany Union Church, Chicago, IL, 1926
- Ocean Forest Hotel, Myrtle Beach, SC, 1926-1927
- McCormick Mausoleum, Rockford, IL, 1927
- William R. Morris House, Greenwich, CT, 1927
- 711 Fifth Avenue, New York, NY, 1927
- 3 East 84th Street, New York, NY, 1928; with John Mead Howells
- Ideal House, London, UK, 1929
- Daily News Building, New York, NY, 1929
- Masonic Temple, Scranton, PA, 1929
- Beaux-Arts Apartments, 307 and 310 East 44th Street, New York, NY, 1930
- DuPont Building; Wilmington, DE, 1930; additions with Godley and Fouilhoux
- Joseph Patterson Residence, Ossining, NY, 1930; with Fouilhoux
- Rockefeller Center, New York, NY, 1933–1937; where Hood was a senior architect on the Associated Architects
- Rex Cole Showrooms, Bay Ridge and Flushing, NY, 1931; with Godley and Fouilhoux
- McGraw-Hill Building, New York, NY, 1931

=== Unbuilt works ===
- Pawtucket City Hall, Pawtucket, RI, 1911
- Providence Civic Center, Providence, RI, 1916
- Providence County Court House, Providence, RI, 1924; competition
- Polish National Alliance Building, Chicago, IL, 1924; Hood's design won the competition but was never built
- Ridgewood Municipal Building, Ridgewood, NJ, 1926; Hood's design won the competition but was never built
- Central Methodist Episcopal Church, Columbus, OH, 1927
- Rockland County Courthouse, New City, NY, 1929; competition
- Girard College Chapel, Philadelphia, PA, 1930; competition
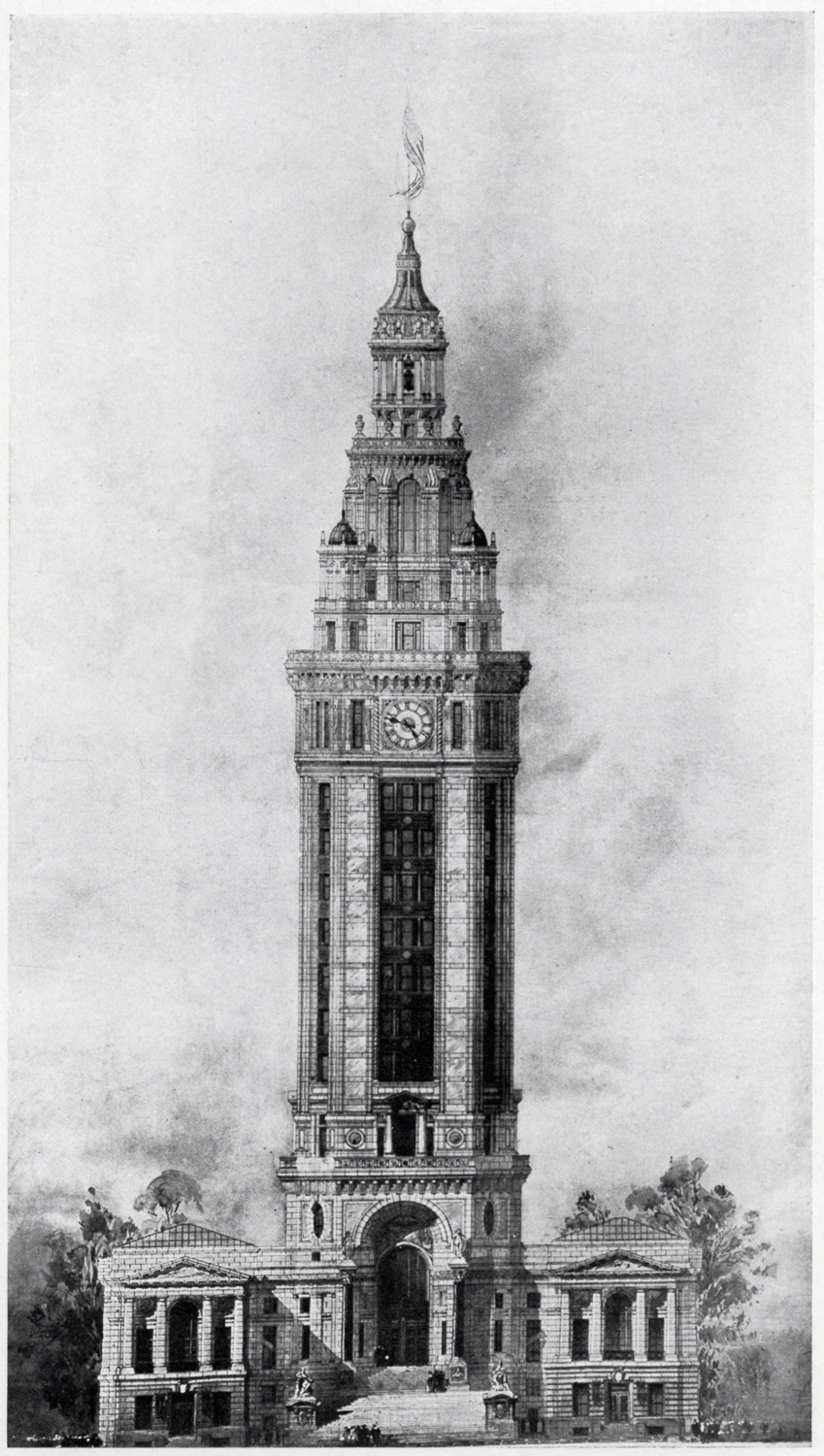
Pawtucket City Hall (unbuilt)

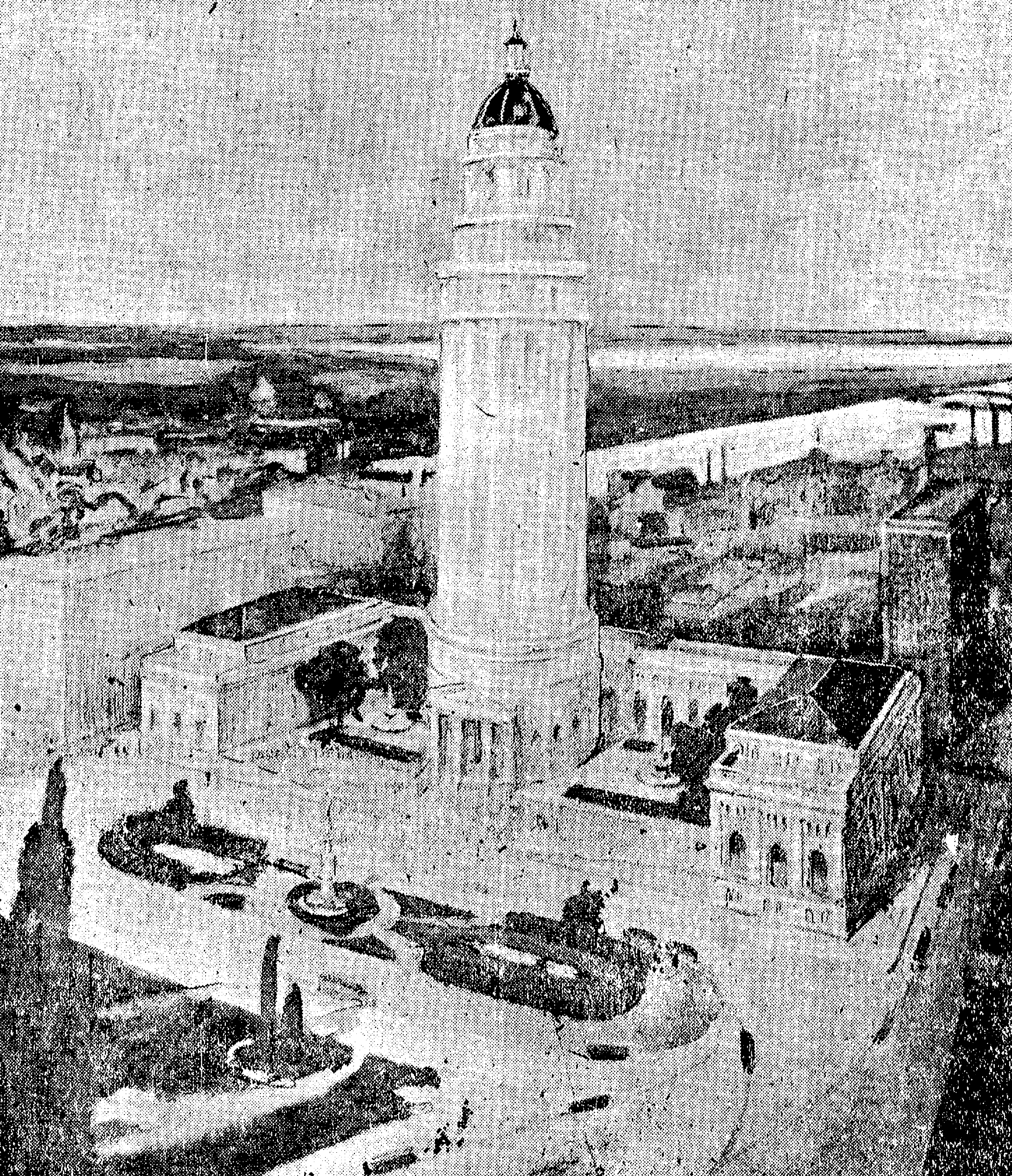
Providence Civic Center (unbuilt)

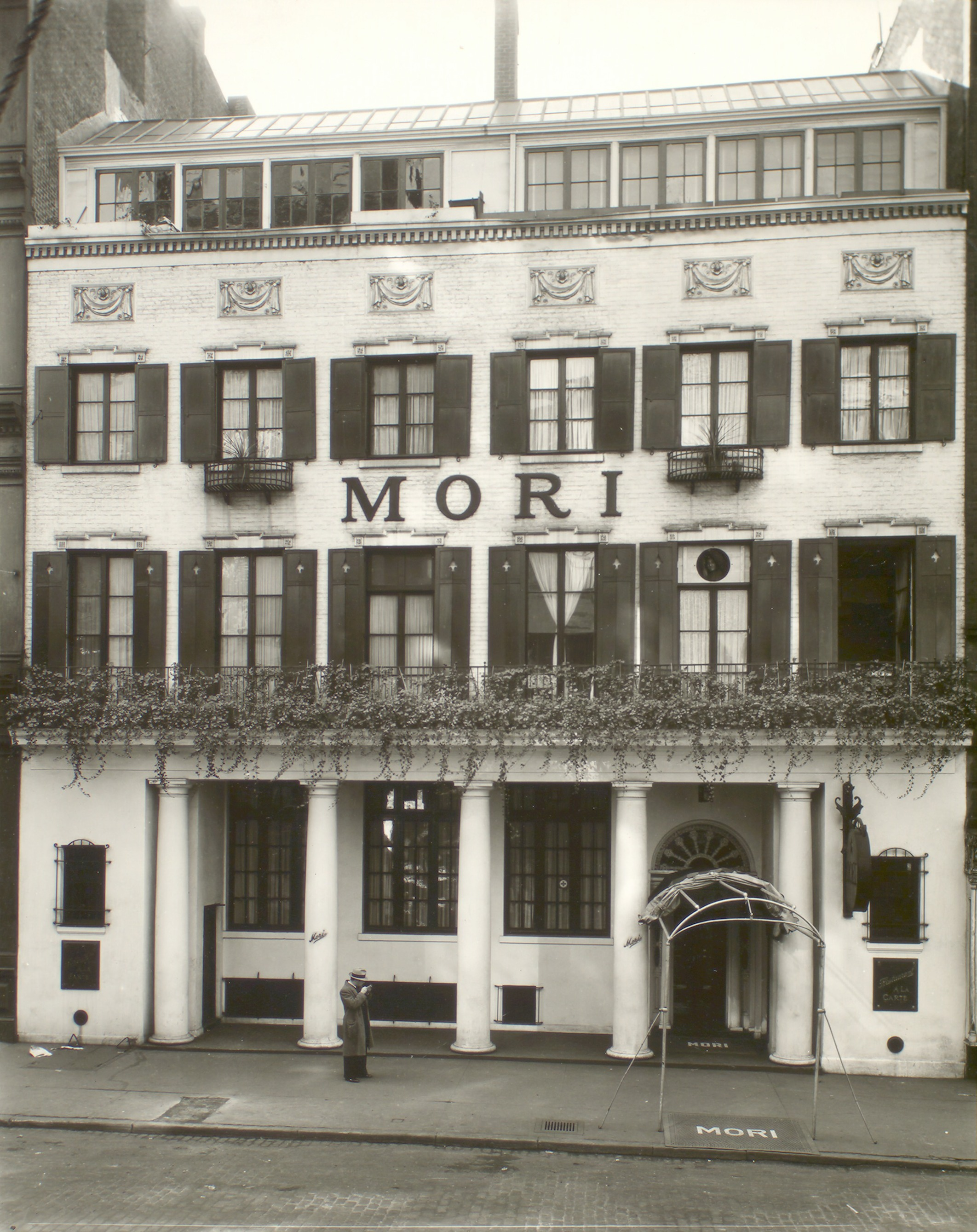
Mori Restaurant

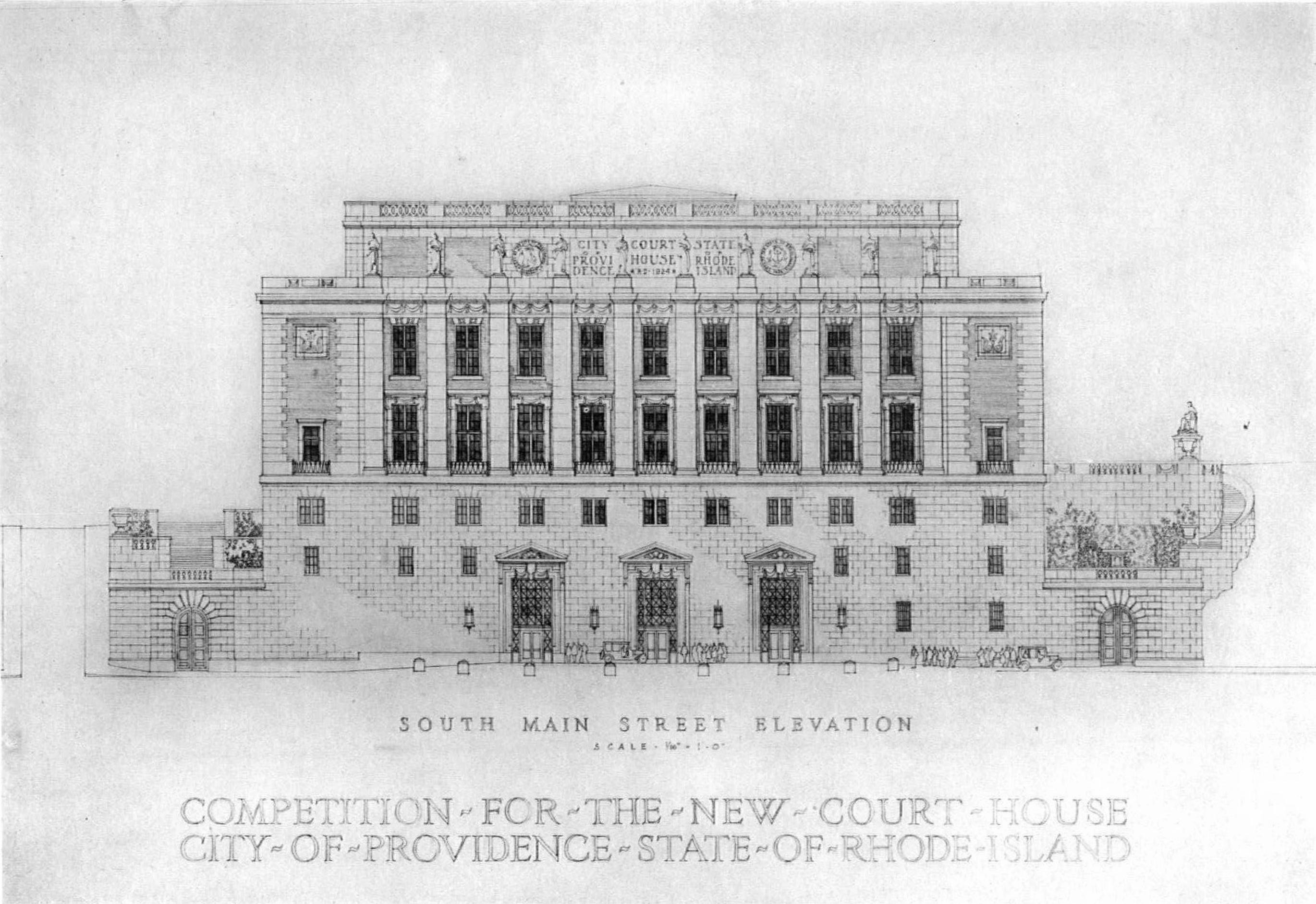
Providence County Court House (unbuilt)

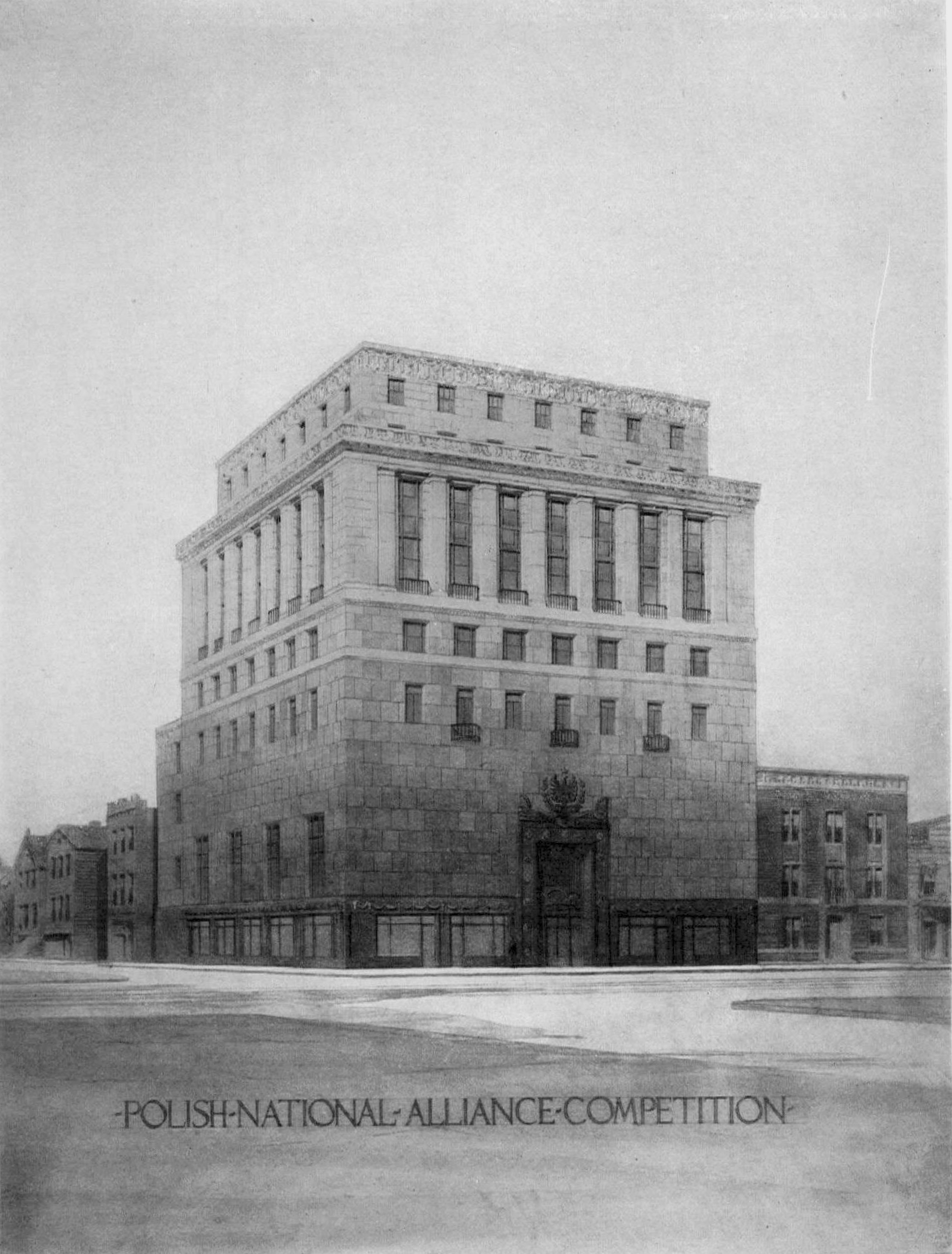
Polish National Alliance Building (unbuilt)

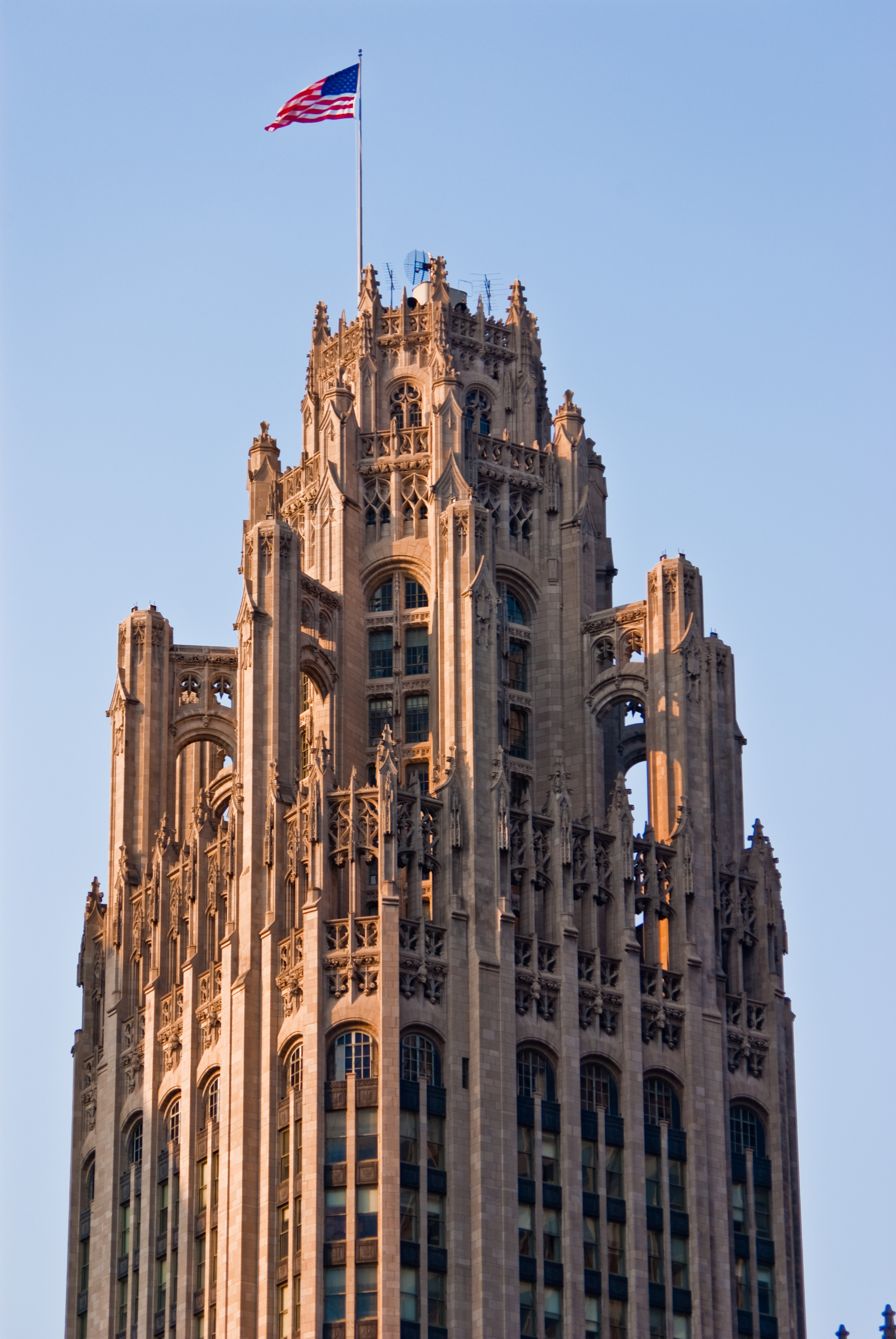
Tribune Tower

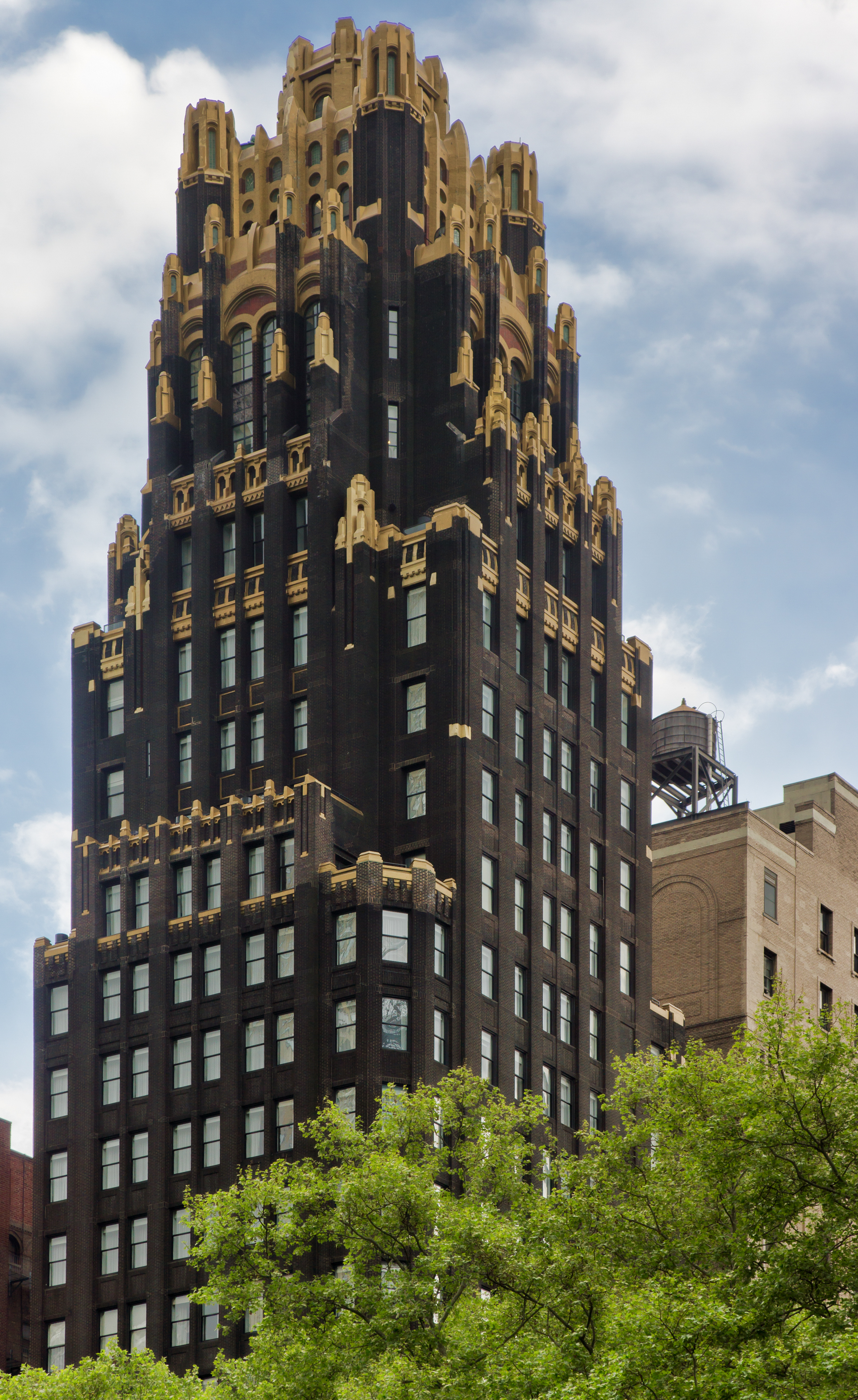
American Radiator Building

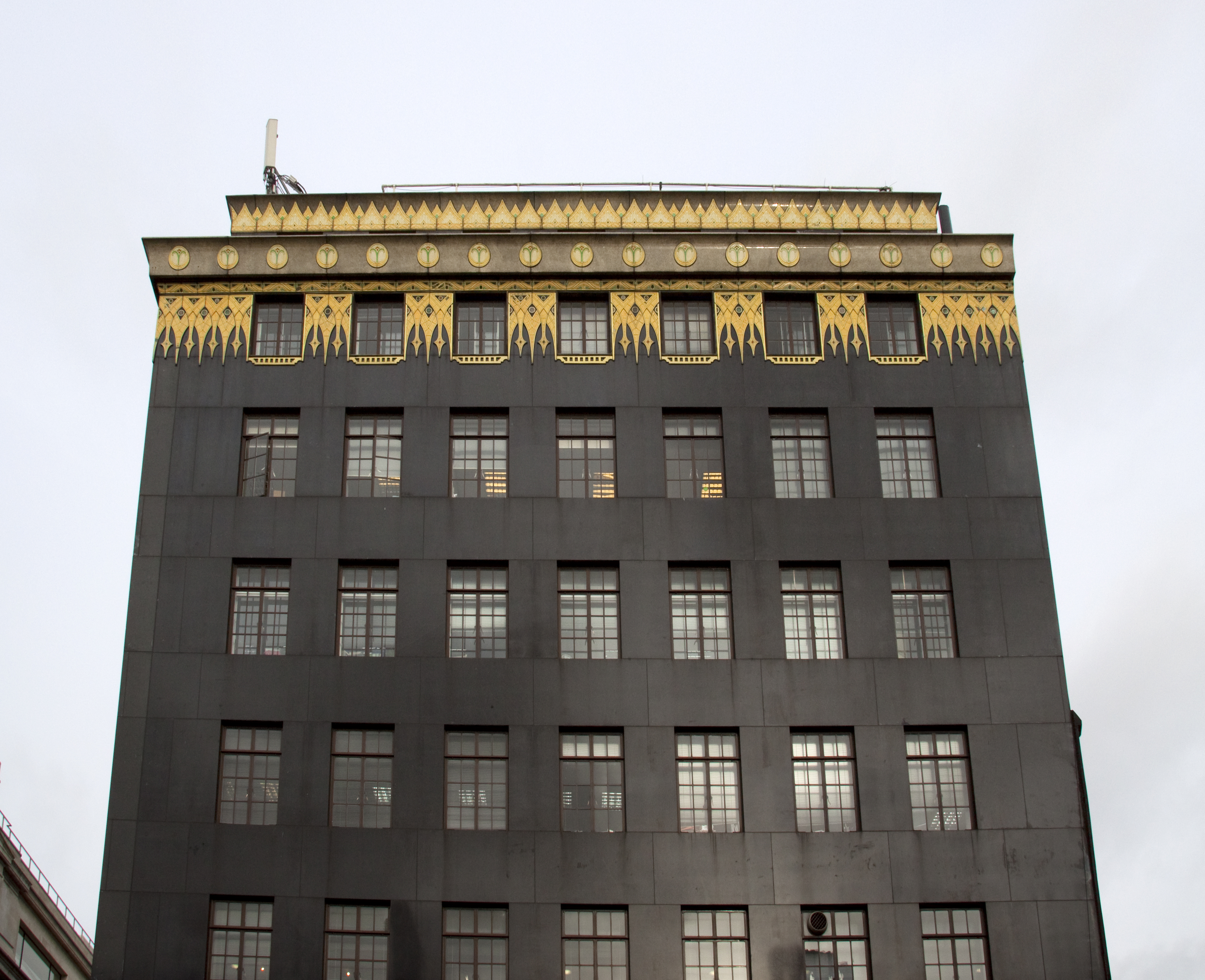
Ideal House

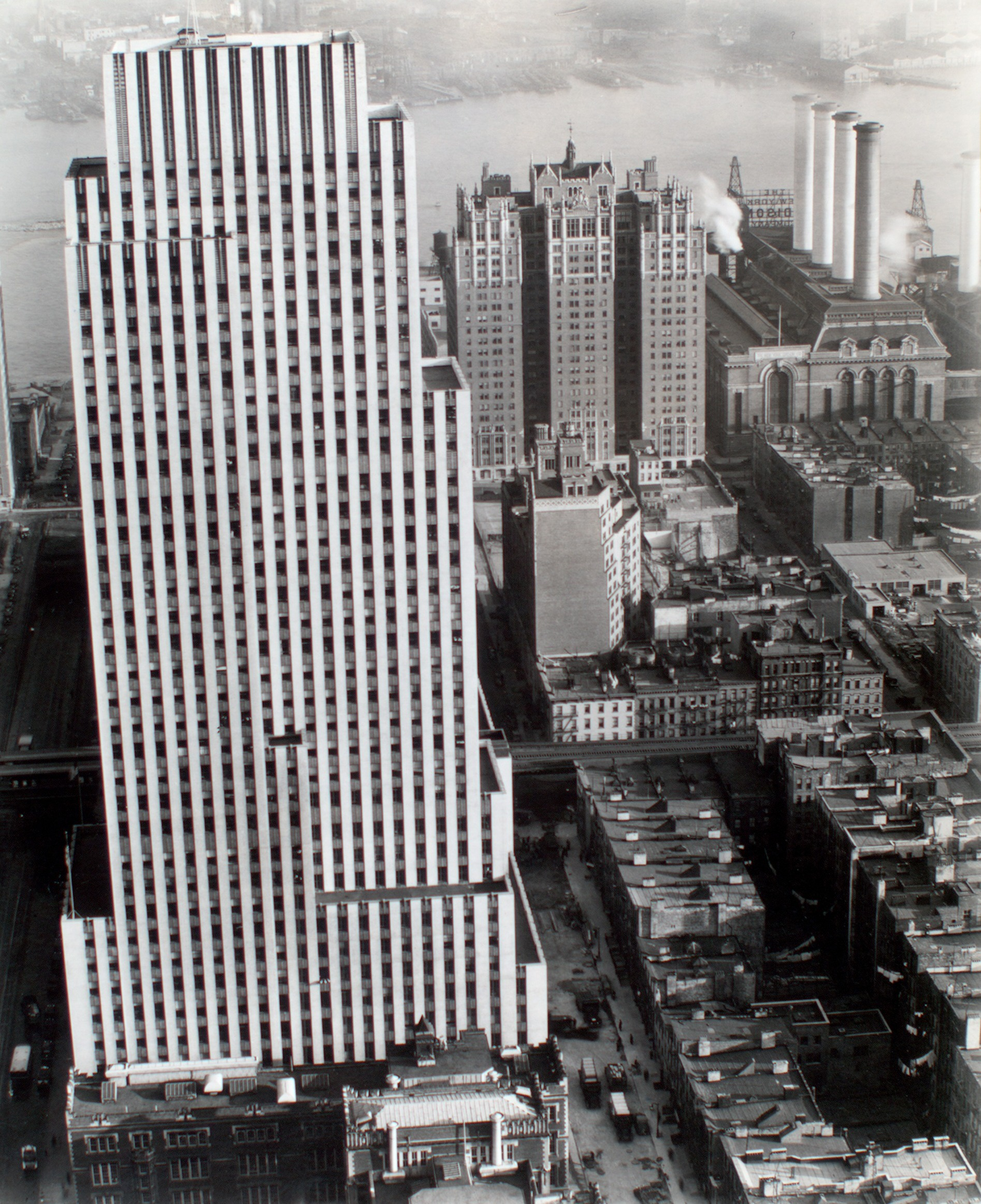
Daily News Building

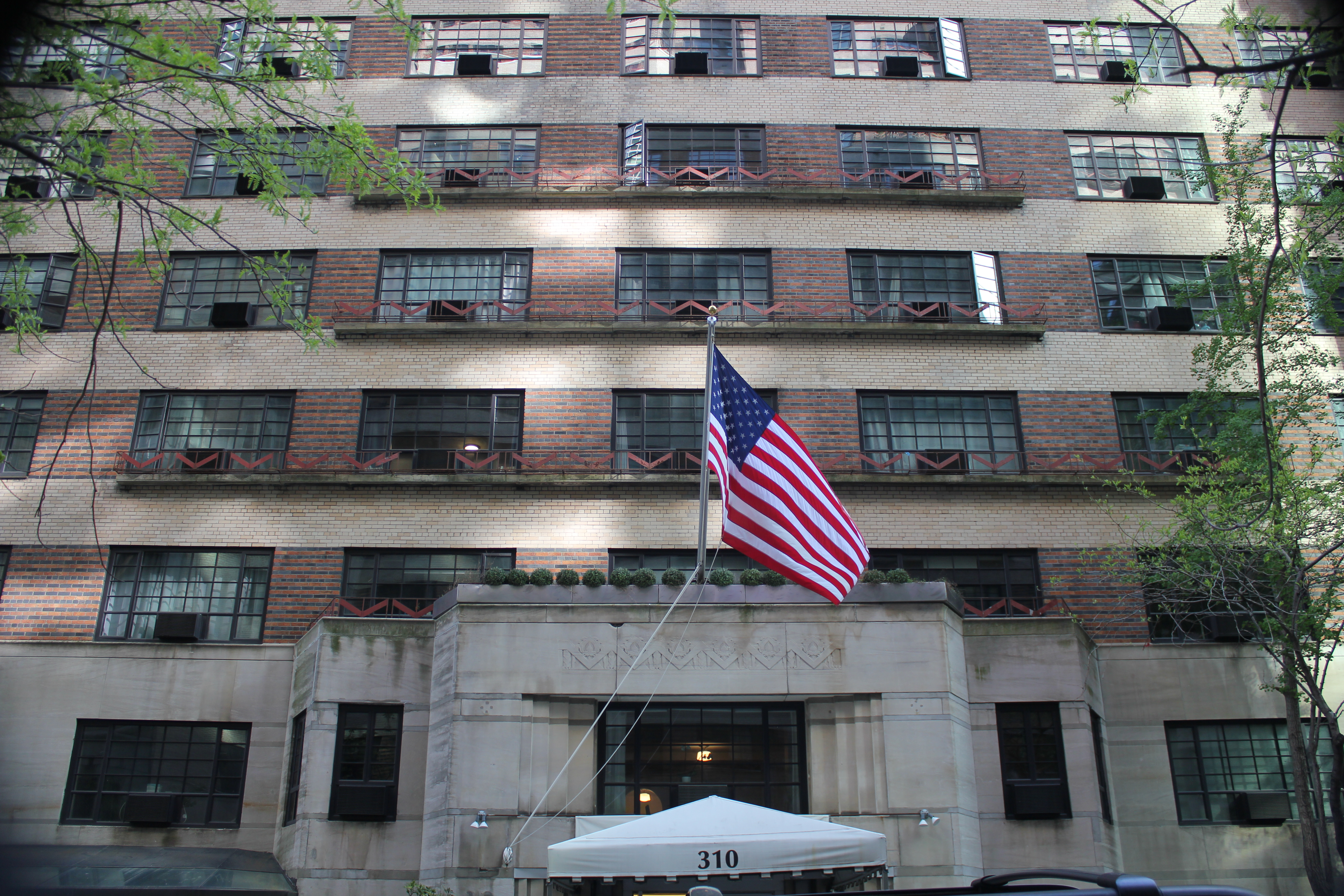
Beaux-Arts Apartments

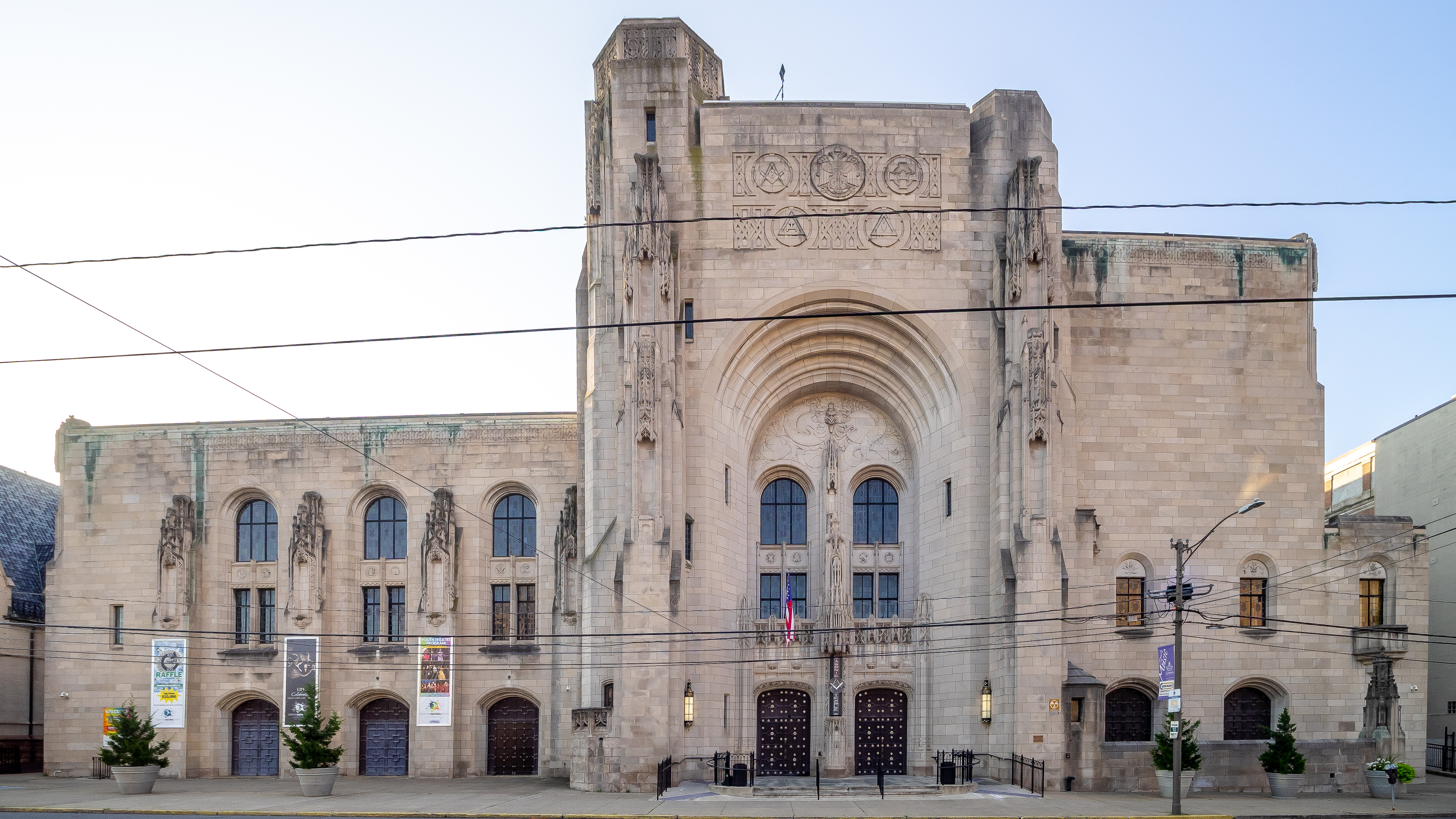
Scranton Cultural Center

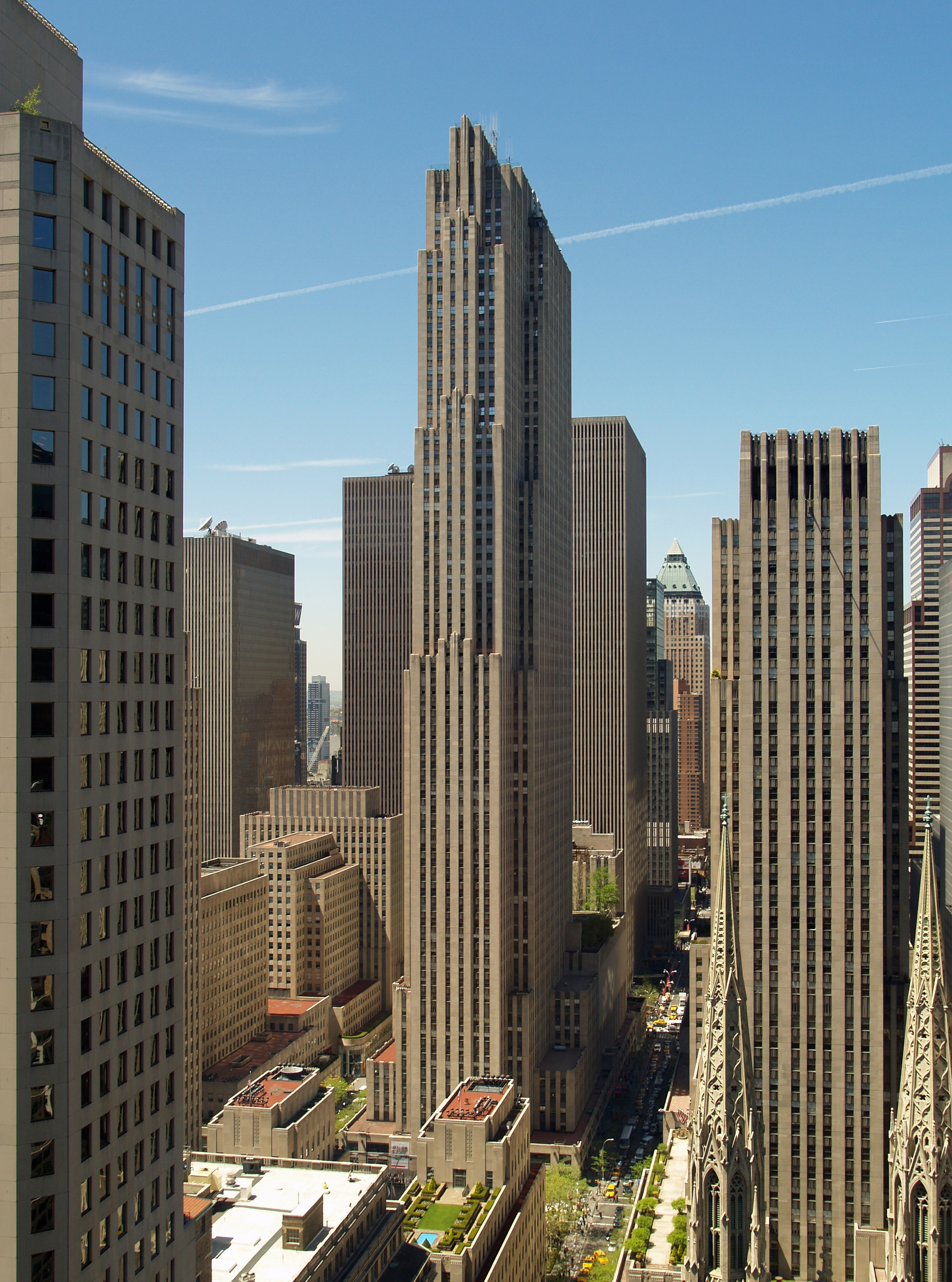
Rockefeller Center

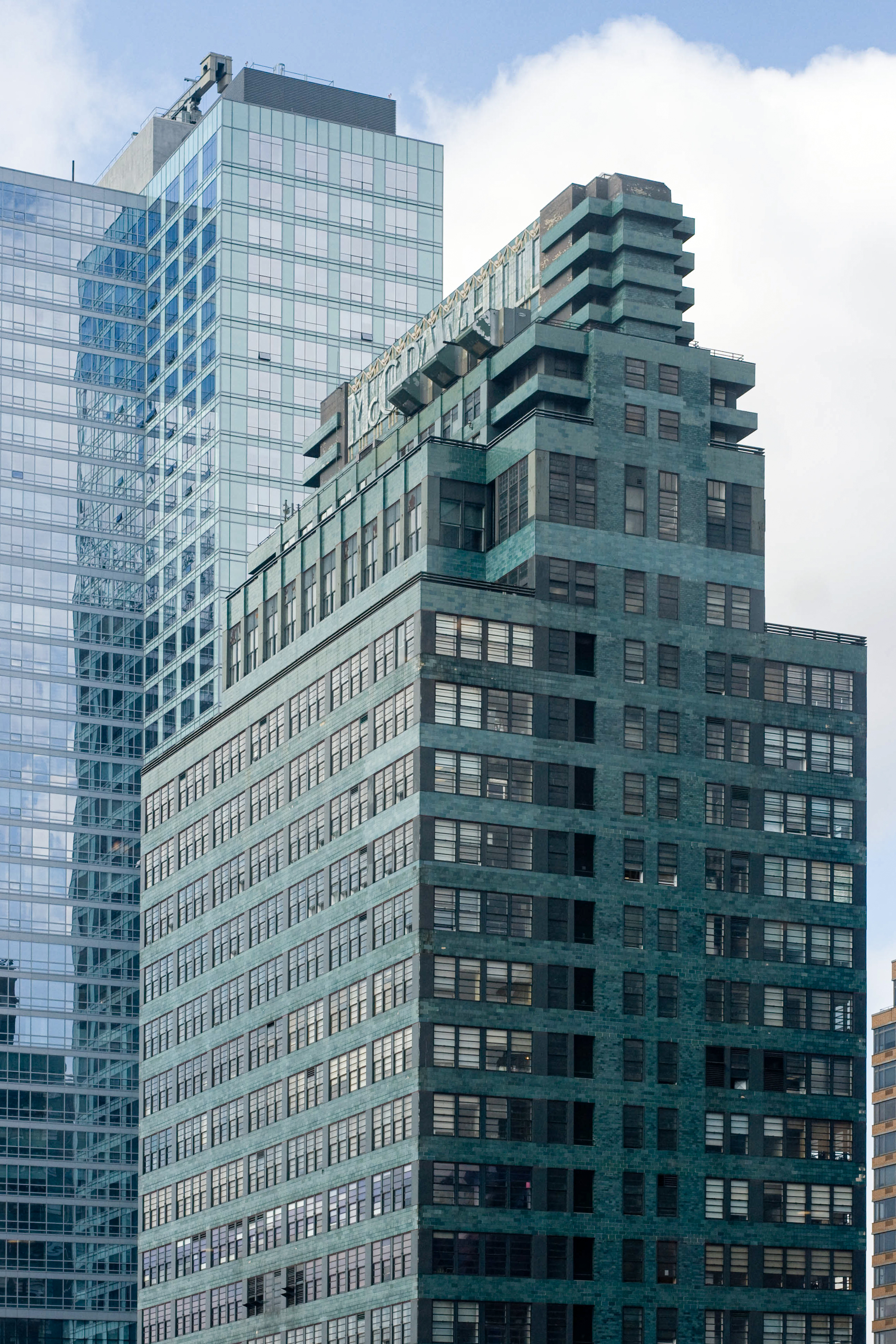
McGraw-Hill Building

== Exhibitions ==
In 1984, the Whitney Museum hosted an exhibition of Hood's work entitled "City of Towers." Curated by Carol Willis, the exhibit featured Hood's sketches and blueprints.

In 2020, The David Winton Bell Gallery at Brown University, Hood's alma mater, held an online exhibition titled "Raymond Hood and the American Skyscraper." The exhibition focused on a selection of Hood's built and unbuilt skyscrapers, and included about 70 of his architectural drawings, photographs, models, and books.
