= Jeannette Genius McKean =

American painter

Jeannette Genius McKean (1909–1989) was a painter, interior decorator, Louis Comfort Tiffany art glass collector, Morse Museum founder and benefactor of Rollins College. She is listed as a Great Floridian. The Jeanette Genius McKean Memorial 5k run is held annually in her honor.

McKean was born in Chicago and moved with her parents to New York. She attended Dana Hall and Pine Manor Junior College in Wellesley, Massachusetts and studied art at Grand Central Art School and the Art Students League in New York. Her grandfather, Charles Hosmer Morse, lived in Winter Park, Florida where she settled.

She opened the Morse Museum at Rollins College in 1942 and named it for her grandfather. Her husband, Hugh F. McKean, served as director. After his return home from World War II, she married Hugh McKean in 1945.
