= Tiffany jewelry =

Silver bracelet

- Founder: Louis Comfort Tiffany
- Headquarters: United States
- Products: Jewellery

Tiffany jewelry was the jewelry created and supervised by Louis Comfort Tiffany at Tiffany & Co., during the Art Nouveau movement.

== History ==
Louis Comfort Tiffany waited until after his father’s death (Charles Lewis Tiffany) in 1902 before beginning to create jewelry. On March 22, 1902, Tiffany received approval to become a member of Tiffany & Co.’s board of directors, afterwards becoming vice-president and art director. This gave Tiffany the ability to make executive choices; without being under the shadow of his father any longer, Tiffany was able to focus his creative energies on his jewelry.

Tiffany began to experiment with jewelry designs in 1902 at Tiffany Furnaces, with the intent of showing his pieces as part of Tiffany & Co.’s display at the St. Louis Exposition. It was the perfect venue for him to show his range of talent in a variety of media. All the jewelry Tiffany made during this time was stamped with “Louis C. Tiffany,” along with “Artist.” There are no surviving day books nor ledgers to help provide information on how Tiffany went about his jewelry prior to 1907; however his exhibit at the St. Louis Exposition provides some knowledge of his ventures.

== Inspiration ==
For many of the pieces that Tiffany produced during this time, his focus gravitated towards flower‑like inspirations. The nature theme was also a current motif that occurred in many of his other works. He also produced some pieces based on Etruscan prototypes.

Motifs such as wild carrots, dandelions, birds and blackberries were quite common. The scarab theme was also used quite frequently as a decorative motive in his jewelry and desktop items. It is noted that many of the pieces took on a very chunky appearance, reminiscent of the jewelry worn by the Celts. His work was very different from the airy, fluttery look of the Art Nouveau.

Tiffany’s jewelry can be categorized into two main areas of influence, naturalism and historicism, but after further investigation it is apparent that he had many other influences, some being quite unidentifiable.

== Production ==
Tiffany not only explored the various jewelry processes of the time, but also branched out into new metals, such as platinum, which at the time was considered very hard to manipulate.

It seems to be the case that unusual colorations appealed to Tiffany, like the opal. He also preferred gemstones that were either opaque or translucent. Turquoise, jade, carnelian, lapis, moonstones, and opals were all chosen for their ability to filter light. Emphasis based on color was very prevalent in his works.

He devoted his first year of jewelry‑making mainly to focus towards forms and techniques, and only really began to put a collection together once he was satisfied with the fruits of his labor.

Once Tiffany & Co. began to manufacture his jewelry, there was a marked evolution in his pieces. His earlier pieces went from being made in a “hand-wrought”-looking manner, to a much more symmetrical and stylized fashion. There was a great variety of jewelry produced during the 26 years that Louis Tiffany's enameling and jewelry division was in operation at Tiffany & Co. It has been estimated that nearly 5,500 pieces were produced during that time, an impressive amount considering the detail and craftsmanship in each piece.

He produced the same high-quality artisanship that was very much prized during the Arts and Crafts movement.

== Lasting impressions ==
One of the last significant pieces that Tiffany produced was a plique-à-jour gold chalice enameled with peacock feathers, which he had designed in 1925. The cup portion of it was shaped like a tulip, once again reinforcing his admiration for nature. The peacock motif, shown in many of his pieces, is thought to have been his last appeal to immortality.
