= Charles Hosmer Morse Museum of American Art =

Museum in Florida, United States

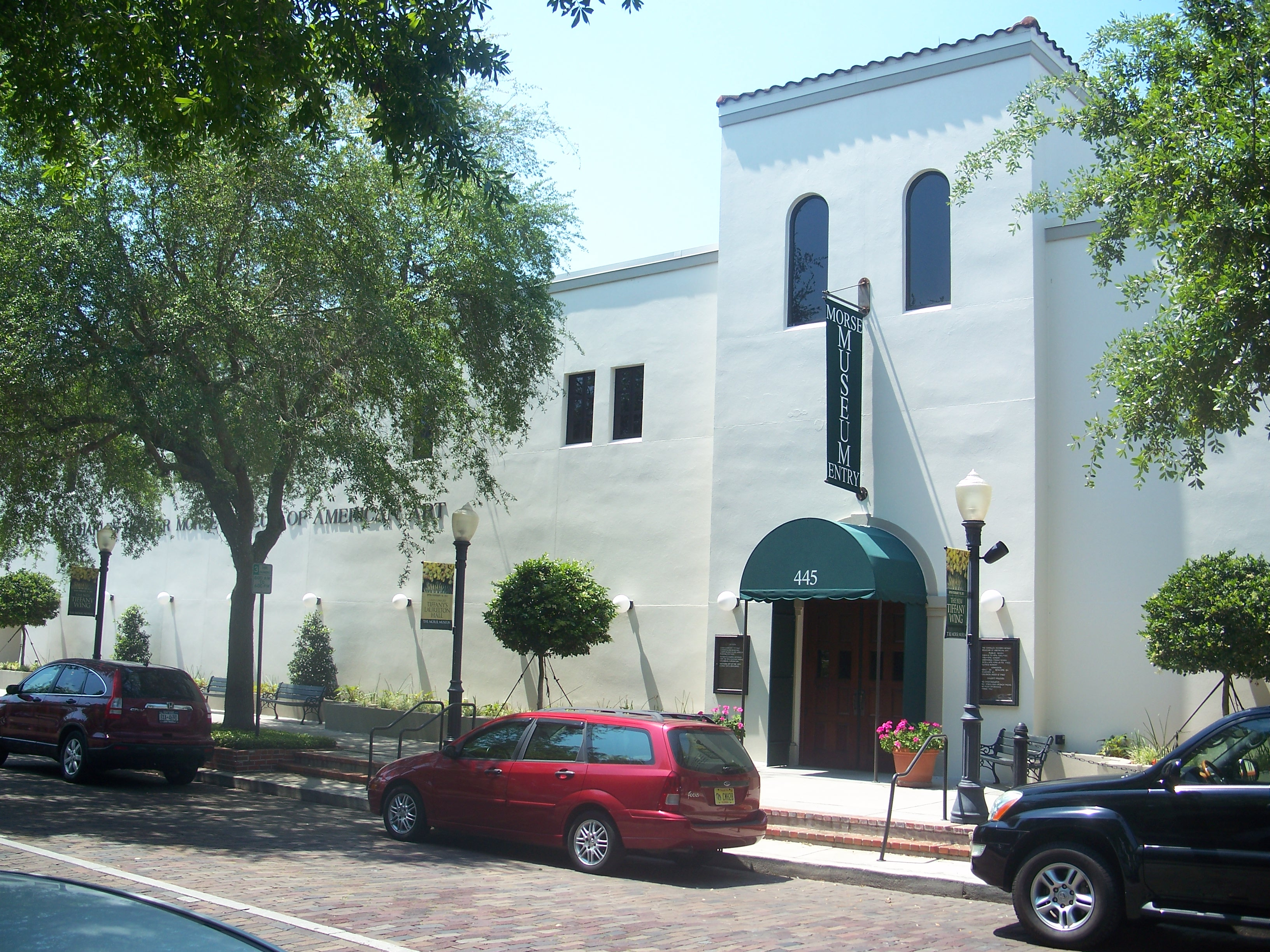

- Location within Florida Location within the United States
- Established: 1942
- Location: 445 North Park Avenue; Winter Park, Florida
- Coordinates: 28.60086°N 81.35140°W
- Type: Art
- Website: www.morsemuseum.org

The Charles Hosmer Morse Museum of American Art, a museum noted for its Art Nouveau collection, houses the most comprehensive collection of the works of Louis Comfort Tiffany found anywhere, a major collection of American art pottery, and fine collections of late-19th- and early-20th-century American paintings, graphics and the decorative arts. It is located in Winter Park, Florida.

== History ==
The museum was founded by Jeannette Genius McKean in 1942 and dedicated to Chicago industrialist Charles Hosmer Morse, her grandfather. The museum's first director was her husband, Hugh McKean.

The museum was first located on the campus of Rollins College. There, in 1955, the McKeans organized the first exhibition of works by Louis Comfort Tiffany since the artist's death in 1933.

In 1957, Hugh McKean learned from Tiffany's daughter that Tiffany's estate, Laurelton Hall, had burned to a ruin. McKean, who had been an art student at Tiffany's Laurelton Hall estate in 1930, remembered Jeannette's exact words at the scene of the devastation: "Let's buy everything that is left and try to save it."

Among these acquisitions were parts of Tiffany's 1893 chapel for the World's Columbian Exposition; award-winning leaded glass windows; and major architectural elements such as the poppy loggia, which was donated to the Metropolitan Museum of Art and installed in the Charles Englehart Court.

The museum moved to a location on East Welborne Avenue, Winter Park in 1978. The museum opened at its current location on Park Avenue in 1995, and it now has more than 19,000 square feet (1,800 m^{2}) of public and exhibition space.

In February 2017, the museum celebrated its 75th anniversary with a retrospective exhibition.

== The Tiffany collection ==
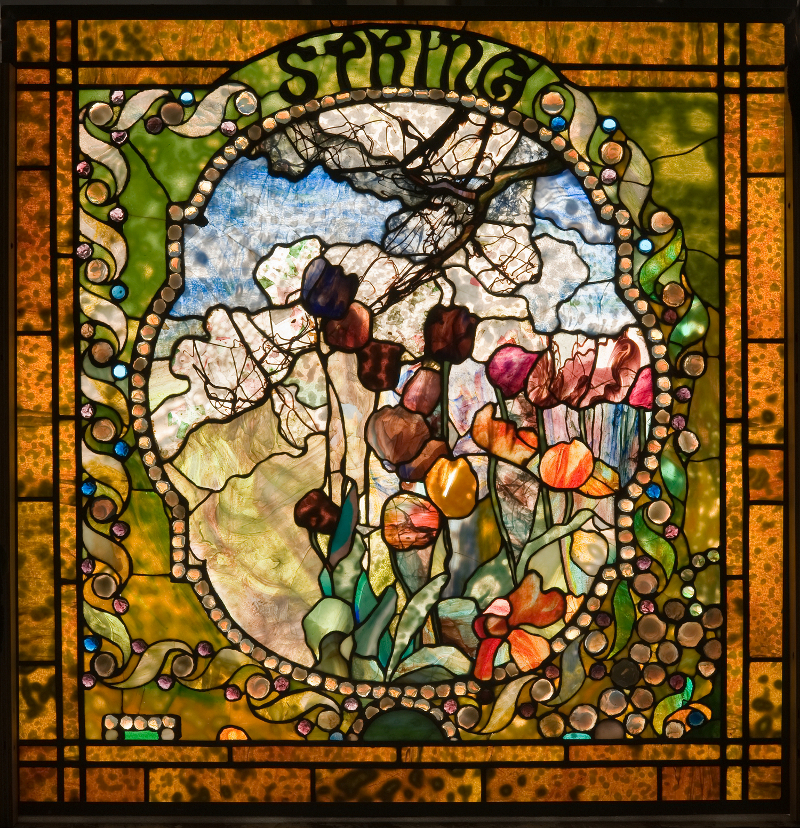
Spring panel from the Four Seasons window, c. 1899–1900. This panel was on display at Louis Comfort Tiffany's home Laurelton Hall, and is on view at museum

The Tiffany collection forms the centerpiece of the Morse Museum. It includes examples in every medium he explored, in every kind of work he produced, and from every period of his life. Holdings range from award-winning leaded-glass windows down to glass buttons. It includes paintings and extensive examples of his pottery, as well as jewelry, enamels, mosaics, watercolors, lamps, furniture and examples of his Favrile blown glass.

The collection includes the reconstructed Tiffany Chapel which he created for the World's Columbian Exposition at Chicago in 1893, with its brilliantly colorful windows, mosaics, Byzantine-Romanesque architectural elements and furnishings. The chapel was fully reassembled and opened in April 1999 to the general public for the first time in more than 100 years. It is approximately 39 feet (12 m) long and 23 feet (7.0 m) wide, rising at its highest point to about 24 feet (7.3 m).

In February 2011, the Morse opened a wing that provided for 6,000 square feet (560 m^{2}) gallery space for the permanent exhibition of its collection of art and architectural objects from Tiffany’s Long Island country estate, Laurelton Hall.

== Other collections ==
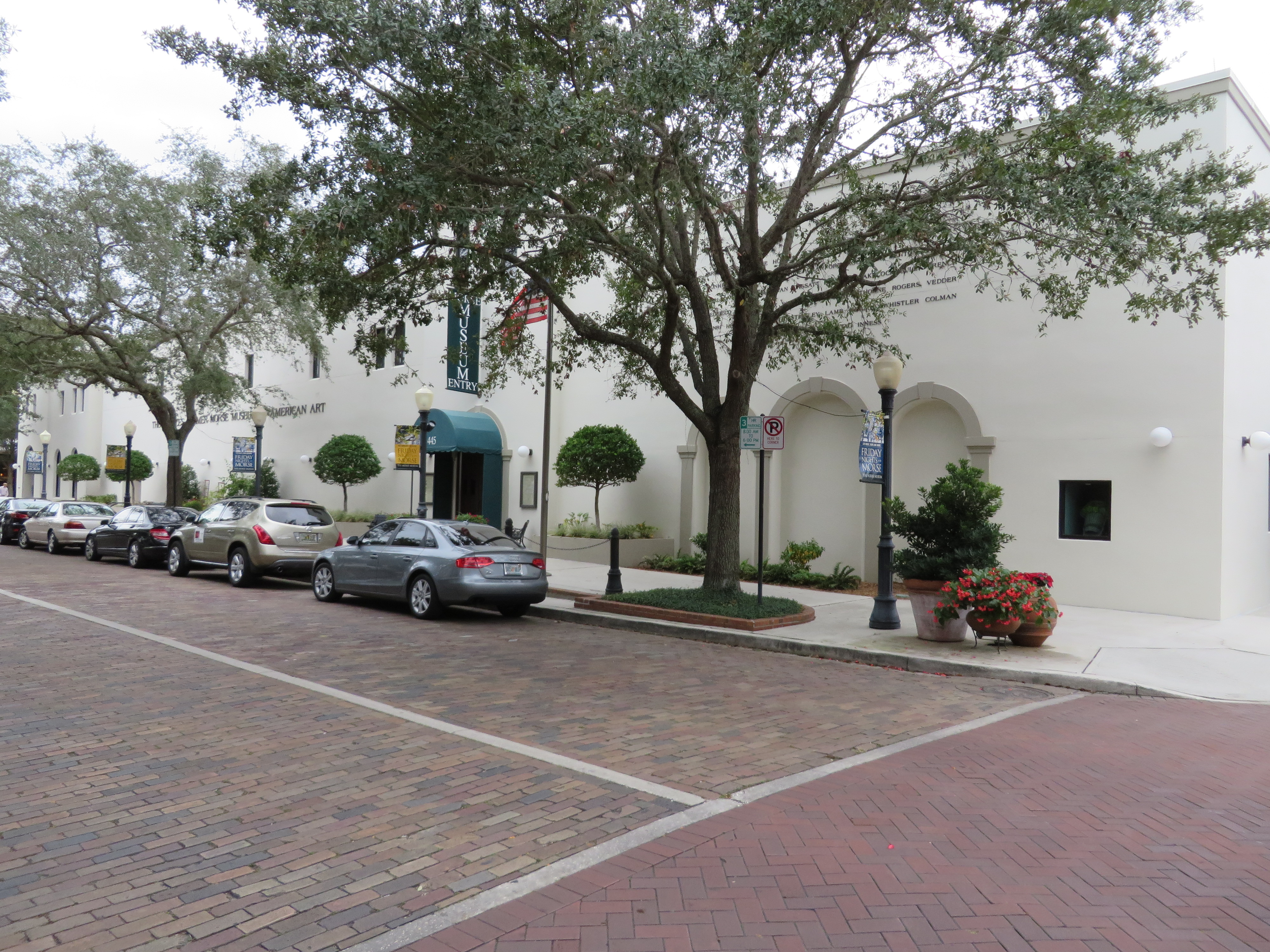
Morse Museum

Other leaded-glass windows in the collection include work by William Morris, Louis Sullivan, Frank Lloyd Wright, John LaFarge and Arthur J. Nash. Emile Gallé, René Lalique, and Peter Carl Fabergé are represented in the jewelry and silver. The furniture collection includes pieces by Emile Gallé, Louis Majorelle, and Gustav Stickley, as well as those by Tiffany. The museum also has over 800 pieces in its 19th-century American Art Pottery collection, including about 300 Rookwood pieces. The sculpture collection includes work by Thomas Crawford, Hiram Powers, Daniel Chester French, John Rogers, and others.

The museum also has a collection of American paintings and prints. The paintings include work by Samuel F. B. Morse (a relative of Charles Hosmer Morse), Thomas Doughty, George Inness, John Singer Sargent, Rembrandt Peale, Cecilia Beaux, Martin Johnson Heade, Maxfield Parrish, Arthur B. Davies, Hermann Herzog, Thomas Hart Benton, and Samuel Colman. Prints include work by some of the same artists as well as Grant Wood, Mary Cassatt, Paul Cézanne, Childe Hassam, John Steuart Curry, and Edward Hopper.
