= Laurelton Hall =

Destroyed mansion in Laurel Hollow, New York

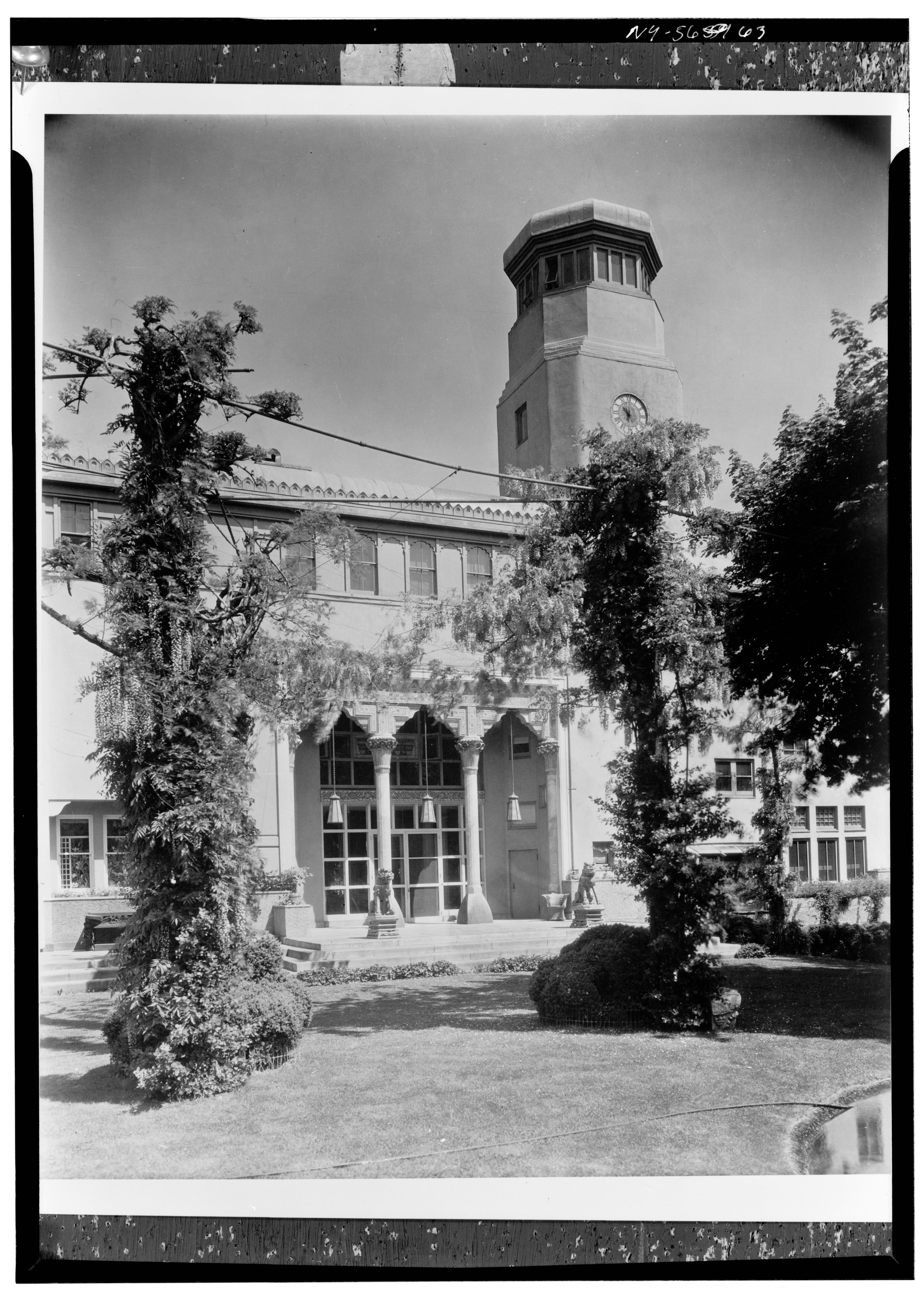
- Front facade of Laurelton Hall
- Interactive map of the Laurelton Hall area

General information
- Type: Mansion
- Architectural style: Art Nouveau style
- Location: Village of Laurel Hollow in Oyster Bay, New York
- Coordinates: 40.8729°N 73.4823°W
- Completed: 1905
- Owner: Louis Comfort Tiffany (originally)

Other information
- Number of rooms: 84

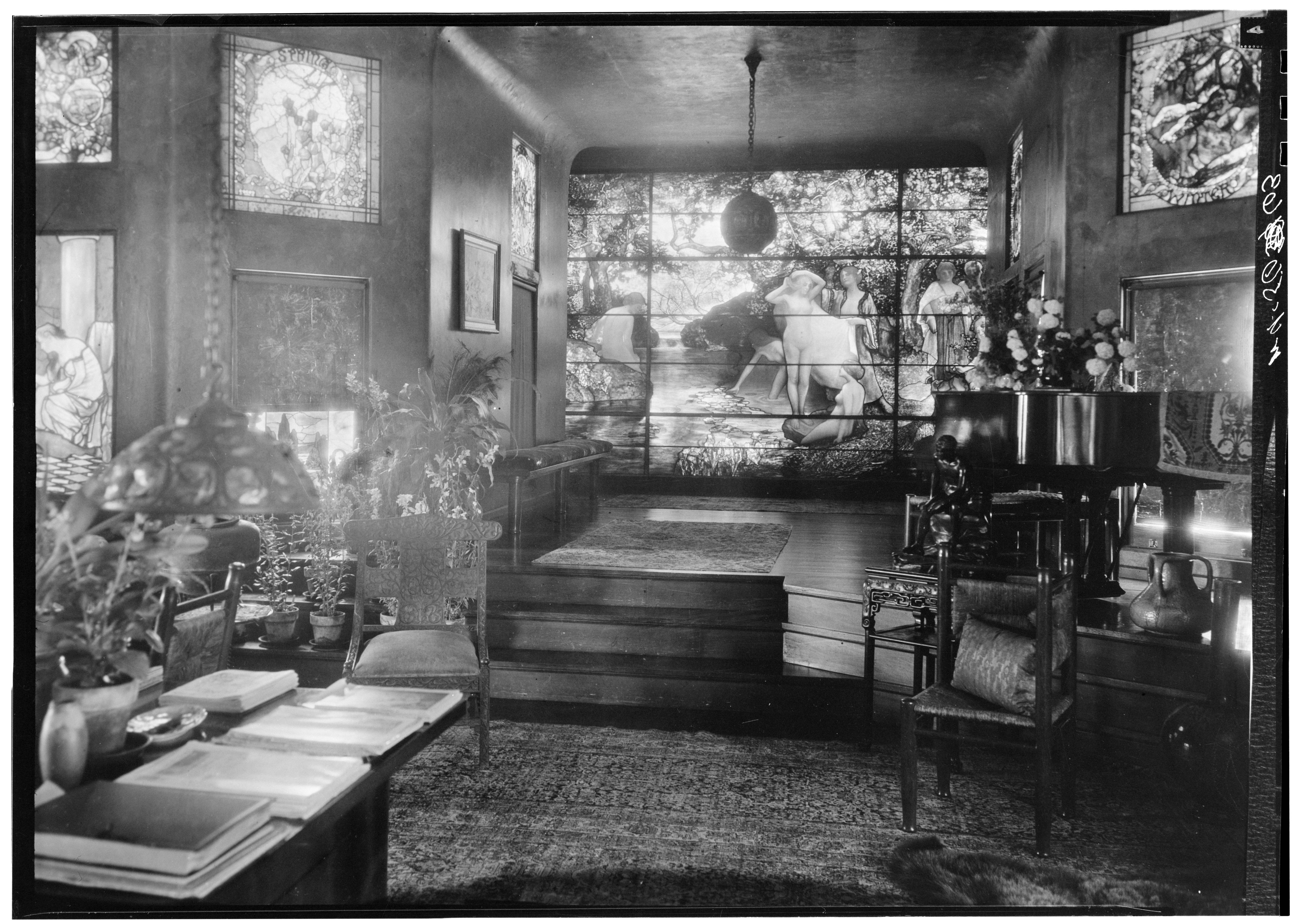
Living room of Laurelton Hall

Laurelton Hall was the home of noted artist Louis Comfort Tiffany, located in Laurel Hollow, New York a village in Oyster Bay, Long Island, New York. The 84-room mansion on 600 acres (2.4 km^{2}) of land, designed in the Art Nouveau style, combined Islamic motifs with connection to nature, was completed in 1905, and housed many of Tiffany's most notable works, as well as serving as a work of art in and of itself. It was also commonly referred to as the "Oyster Bay estate".

== History ==
The mansion was 84-room and sat on 600 acres (2.4 km^{2}) of land, designed in the Art Nouveau style, and combined Islamic motifs with nature. The mansion was completed in 1905 and housed many of Tiffany's most notable stained glass works.

On one visit to the Louis Comfort Tiffany mansion, Laurelton Hall, on June 4, 1916, Elizabeth "Bessie" Handforth Kunz wrote in the guest book: “Arabian night’s dreams vanish, at Laurelton a phantom has become reality, eternal.” The mansion was on the North Shore of Long Island, and had at that time 1,500 acres of woodland and waterfront, and was the location of a residential school for artists, the Tiffany Art Foundation, of which Bessie’s father, Dr. George Frederick Kunz, was a trustee.

Laurelton Hall housed a school for artists run by Tiffany and his Louis Comfort Tiffany Foundation beginning in 1918. The Laurelton Hall grounds also eventually contained a separate building which housed the Tiffany Chapel originally made for the 1893 Columbian Exposition and numerous Tiffany windows, and a separate art gallery building. Laurelton Hall eventually fell into disrepair in the years after Tiffany's death and was sold by the Foundation in 1949. It burned down in 1957. The estate cost about $2,000,000 to construct and landscape, and it was sold for $10,000.

The majority of windows and other surviving architectural pieces were salvaged by Hugh McKean and Jeannette Genius McKean of the Charles Hosmer Morse Museum of American Art and shipped to Winter Park, Florida, after the fire. A major retrospective of Laurelton Hall, Louis Comfort Tiffany and Laurelton Hall: An Artist's Country Estate, opened at New York's Metropolitan Museum of Art in November 2006.

In February 2011, the Morse Museum opened a new wing that provided for 6,000 square feet (560 m^{2}) gallery space for the permanent exhibition of its collection of art and architectural objects from Laurelton Hall.
