= Tiffany Chapel =

1893 installation artwork by Louis Comfort Tiffany

Coordinates: 28°36′03″N 81°21′04″W

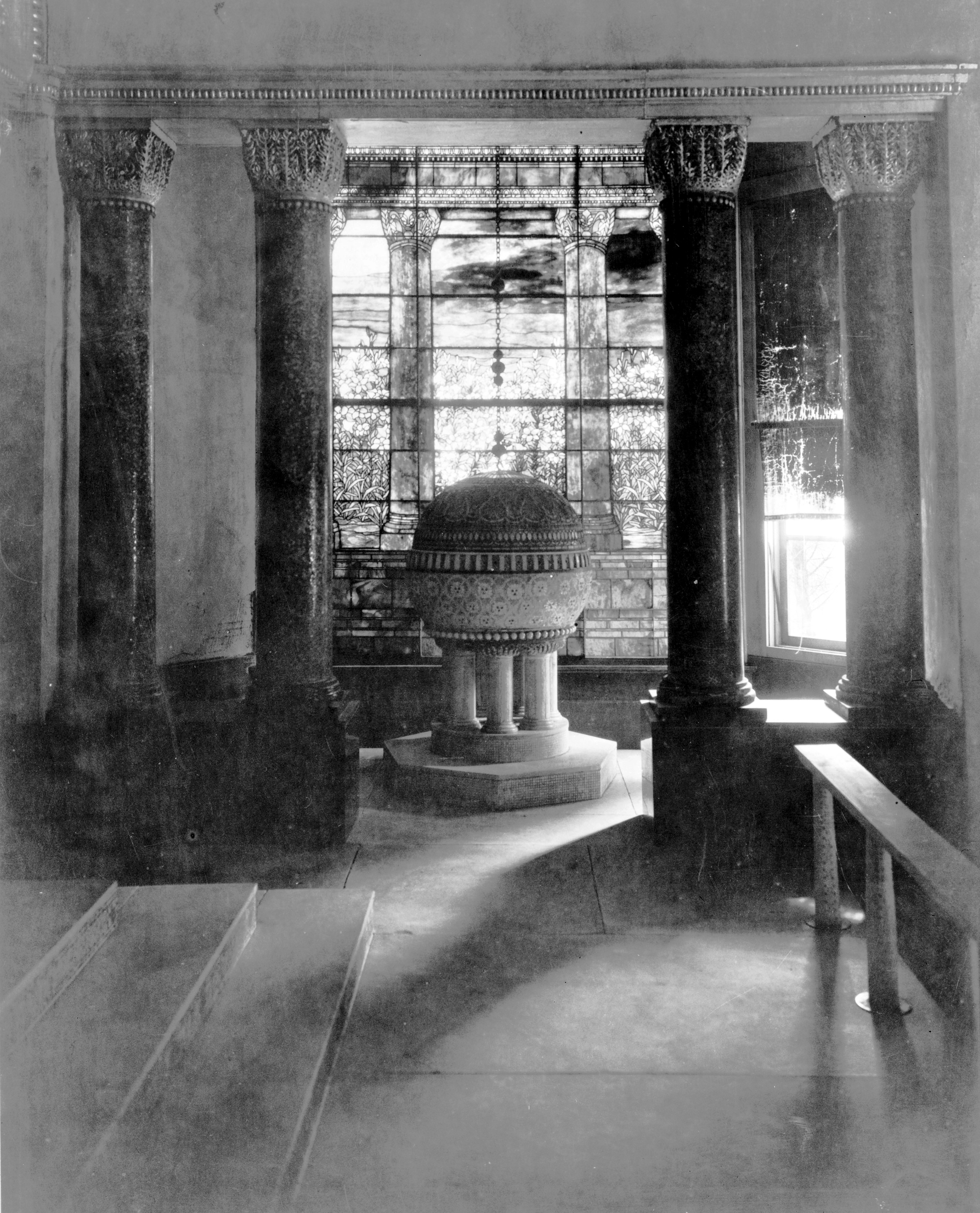
Tiffany Chapel, from the Historic American Buildings Survey

The Tiffany Chapel is a chapel interior designed by Louis Comfort Tiffany and created by the Tiffany Glass and Decorating Company. First installed for the 1893 World's Columbian Exposition in Chicago, the chapel was later moved to the Cathedral of St. John the Divine in New York City, then re-acquired by Louis Tiffany in 1916 and displayed at his own home. It was dismantled in 1949, and parts of it were sold. Fifty years later, the remaining portions were on display at the Charles Hosmer Morse Museum of American Art in Winter Park, Florida.

== Description ==
Created in a Byzantine-Romanesque style, the Tiffany chapel consists of complementing interior elements that include a marble and white glass altar in front of six carved arches each supported by two double columns all on an elevated mosaic platform. A cross stands on the altar between two pairs of candles. The reredos displays a pair of peacocks - symbols of eternal life - under a crown in a Favrile glass mosaic. On the left front is the ambo flanked by two candlesticks. Off to the right is the baptistry its front bordered by four columns and its back showing the large colored glass "Field of Lilies" window repeating the columnar pattern. The globe-shaped baptismal font is sitting on a hexagonal columned base in the center of the baptistry. From the ceiling of the chapel hangs an electrified ten by eight foot emerald glass chandelier in the shape of a cross. Windows in the chapel show Tiffany glasswork built on the mosaic system displaying Christian themes including Christ Blessing the Evangelists and The Story of the Cross. Furnishings include wooden benches. In the museum, the chapel occupies an 1,082 square feet (100 m^{2}) area.

== History ==
In 1893 the then-800 square feet (74 m^{2}) chapel was installed as a showpiece in the Manufacturers and Liberal Arts Building at the 1893 Exposition. Tiffany reportedly said that his was "a chapel in which to worship art". Visited by 1.4 million people, it was greatly admired, brought international attention to Tiffany, and won 54 awards.

After the fair, it was disassembled and placed in storage. In 1898, Celia Whipple Wallace (1833-1916) purchased the chapel for $50,000 to be installed in the Cathedral of St. John the Divine, then under construction in Manhattan. It was installed in the basement crypt with the intent to move it into the main part of the church when that was completed. However, when Ralph Adams Cram took over as architect, the style of the cathedral was changed to "gothic" and the Tiffany chapel stayed in the basement. It was in ecclesiastical use for about twelve years (1899–1911)—the only time it served as a chapel—then abandoned when the choir above was completed, and fell into disrepair. After 1916, Louis Tiffany reacquired it, made repairs and replacements where necessary, and installed it in its own separate building on his Long Island estate, Laurelton Hall. Tiffany died in 1933, and in 1949 the Tiffany Foundation dismantled the chapel and sold some of the pieces.

After a fire in 1957 that destroyed the building it was in, the remnants of the chapel were in disrepair. They were headed for destruction when Jeannette G. and Hugh F. McKean went to Laurelton Hall to recover windows and architectural elements for the Morse Museum in Winter Park. They tracked other parts of the chapel that had been sold and repurchased them, so that the elements of the chapel could be reunited. After an extensive renovation the restored Tiffany Chapel became accessible to the public in 1999. Most of the items are original including the windows, columns, arches, decorative moldings, the altar floor, as well as most of the furnishings. Non-original parts such as the walls, ceilings, and the floor of the nave are redesigned following descriptions of the installation at Laurelton Hall.

== See also ==
- Wade Memorial Chapel
- Willard Memorial Chapel
