= Charles Hosmer Morse =

American businessman and philanthropist

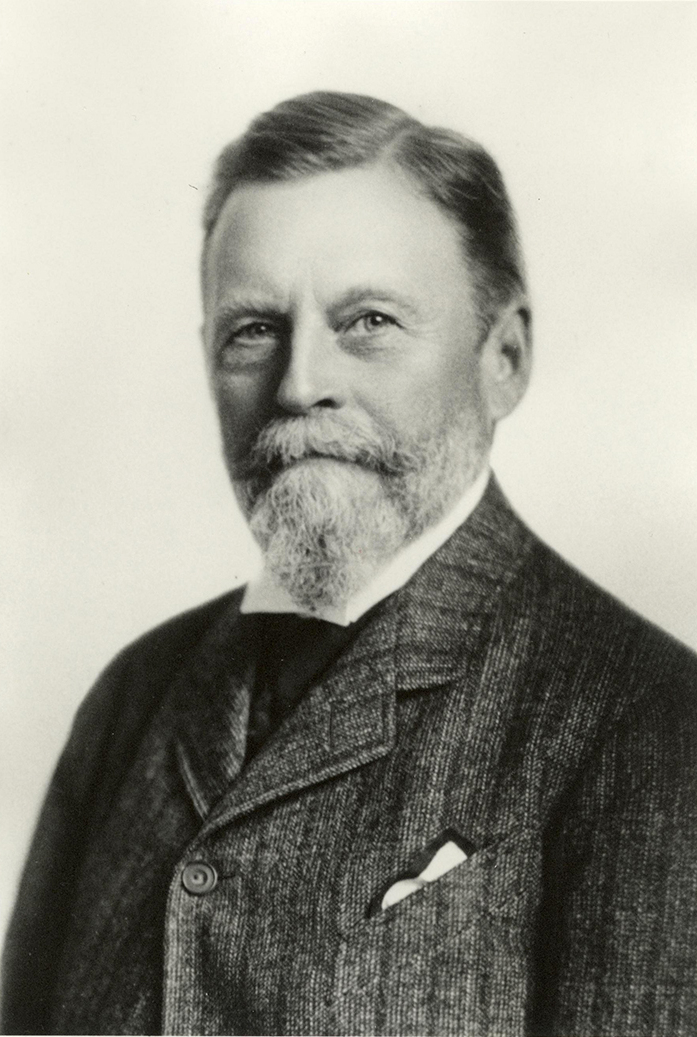
- Born: September 23, 1833; St. Johnsbury, Vermont
- Died: May 5, 1921 (Aged 87); Orange County, Florida
- Occupations: Businessman, developer, philanthropist
- Known for: Founder of Fairbanks, Morse and Co.; Winter Park, Florida city leader

Charles Hosmer Morse (September 23, 1833 – May 5, 1921) was an American businessman and philanthropist. Morse was born at St. Johnsbury, Vermont. He graduated from St. Johnsbury Academy in 1850. Shortly after graduation he joined his uncle, Zelotus Hosmer, in the Boston office of E. & T. Fairbanks, marketing platform scales. He was promoted to the New York office, and then to Chicago, eventually establishing a branch that would go on to be known as Fairbanks-Morse corporation. He was also an early resident of and influential figure in the city of Winter Park, Florida.

Morse was a prominent developer in Chicago, for whom Morse Avenue in far-north Rogers Park takes its name.

== See also ==
- Charles Hosmer Morse Museum of American Art
