= Louis Comfort Tiffany =

American art glass designer (1848–1933)

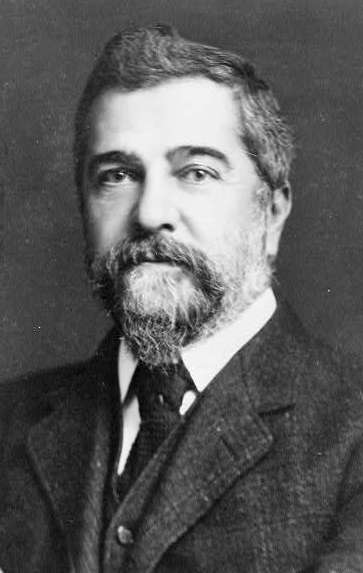
- Tiffany c. 1910
- Born: February 18, 1848; New York City, U.S.
- Died: January 17, 1933 (aged 84); New York City, U.S.
- Resting place: Green-Wood Cemetery (Brooklyn, New York City, U.S.)
- Education: Pennsylvania Military Academy
- Known for: Favrile glass, Tiffany lamps
- Spouse(s): Mary Woodbridge Goddard (1872–1884; her death); Louise Wakeman Knox (1886–1904; her death)
- Children: 8, including Dorothy Burlingham
- Parent(s): Charles Lewis Tiffany; Harriet Olivia Avery Young

Signature
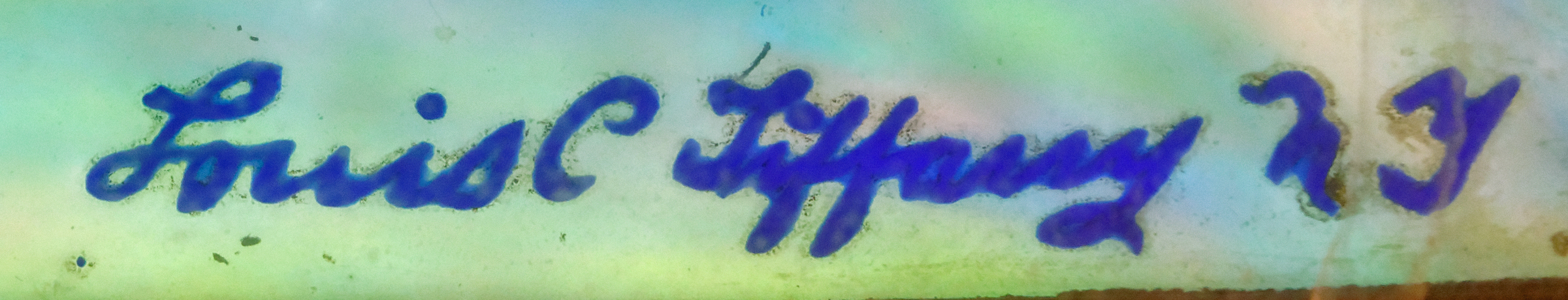

Louis Comfort Tiffany (February 18, 1848 – January 17, 1933) was an American artist and designer who worked in the decorative arts and is best known for his work in art glass, especially stained glass and Favrile glass. He is associated with the art nouveau and aesthetic art movements. He was affiliated with a prestigious collaborative of designers known as the Associated Artists, which included Lockwood de Forest, Candace Wheeler, and Samuel Colman. Tiffany designed stained glass windows and lamps, glass mosaics, blown glass such as vases, ceramics, jewelry, enamels, and metalwork. Glass work by Tiffany Studios is known as Tiffany glass. He was the first design director at Tiffany & Co., the family company founded by his father Charles Lewis Tiffany.

== Early life and education ==
Tiffany was born in New York City, the son of Charles Lewis Tiffany, founder of Tiffany and Company, and Harriet Olivia Avery Young. He attended school at Pennsylvania Military Academy in Chester, Pennsylvania, and Eagleswood Military Academy in Perth Amboy, New Jersey.

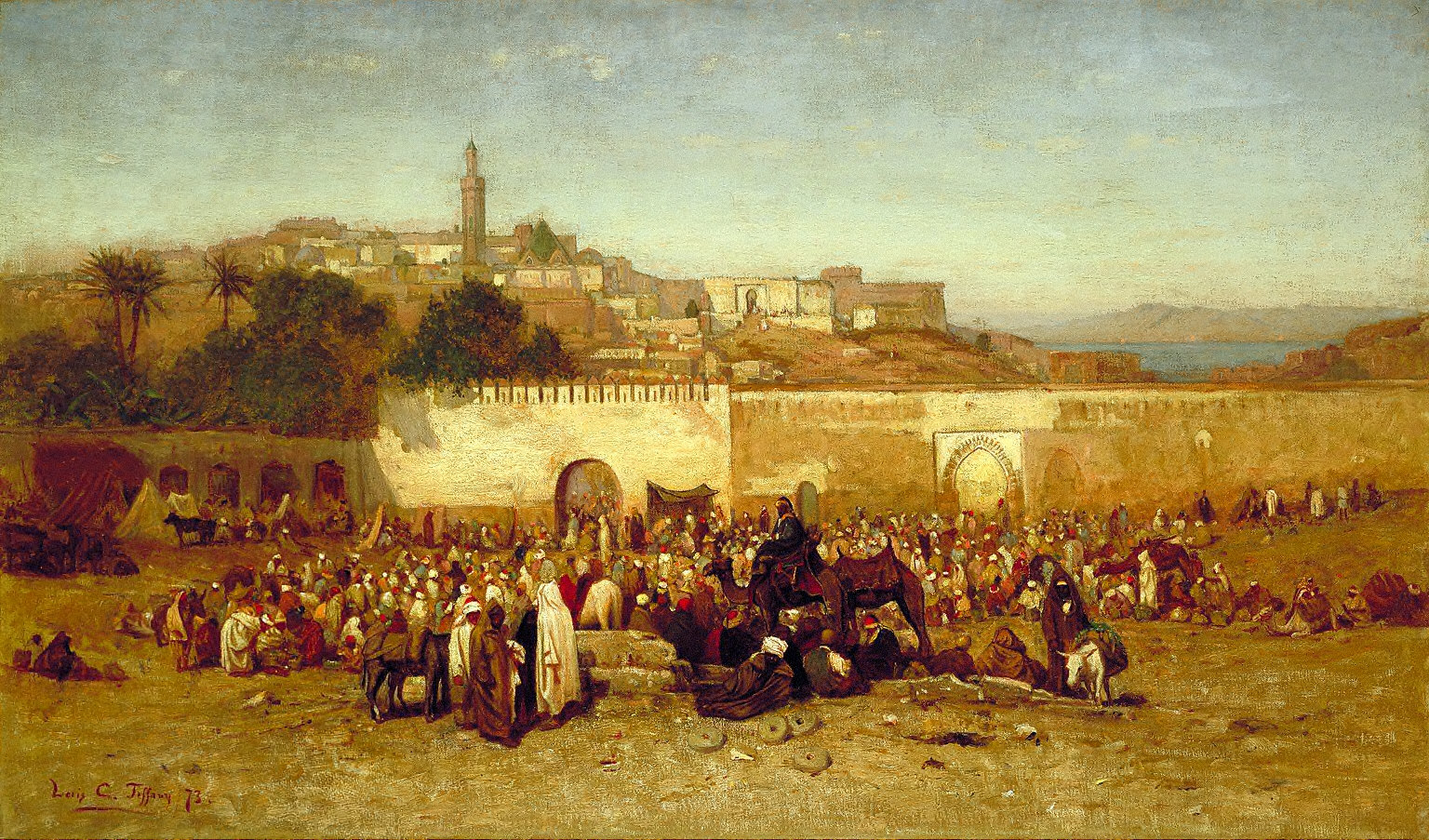
Tiffany's 1873 painting Market Day Outside the Walls of Tangiers, Morocco

Tiffany's first artistic training was as a painter, studying under George Inness in Eagleswood, New Jersey, and Samuel Colman in Irvington, New York. He also studied at the National Academy of Design in New York City in 1866 and 1867 and with salon painter Leon-Adolphe-Auguste Belly in 1868 and 1869. Belly's landscape paintings had a great influence on Tiffany.

Although Tiffany started out as a painter, he became interested in glassmaking from about 1875 and worked at several glasshouses in Brooklyn until 1878. Fellow artists and glassmakers Oliver Kimberly and Frank Duffner, founders of the Duffner and Kimberly Company and John La Farge were Tiffany's chief competitors in this new American style of stained glass. Tiffany, Duffner and Kimberly, along with La Farge, had learned their craft at the same glasshouses in Brooklyn in the late 1870s.

== L. C. Tiffany and Associated American Artists ==
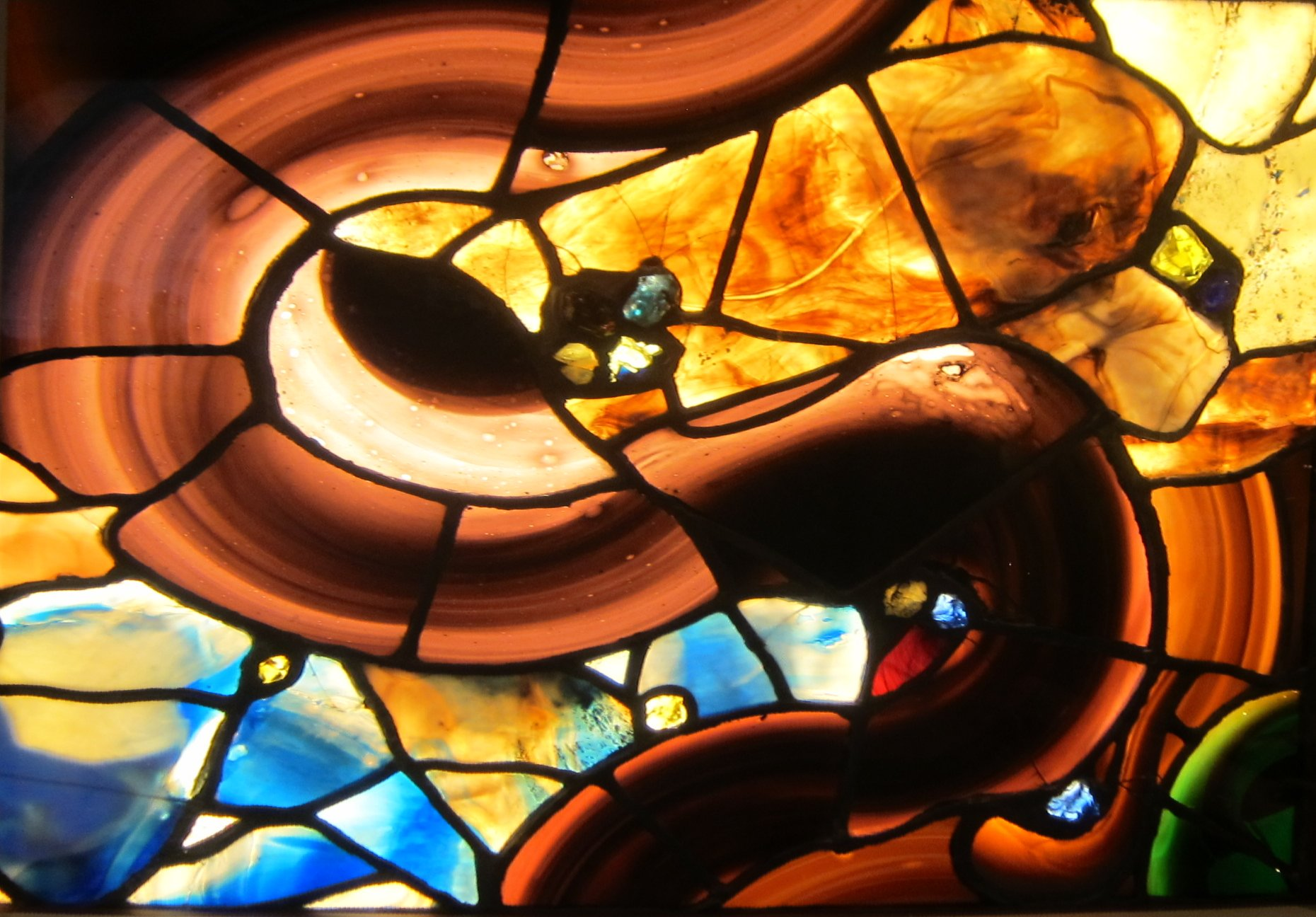
Bella apartment window c. 1880, an early abstract work

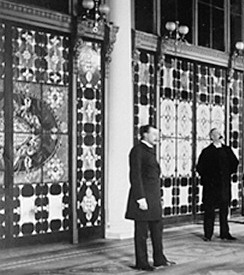
The White House in 1882, showing the newly installed Tiffany glass screens

In 1879 he joined with Candace Wheeler, Samuel Colman, and Lockwood de Forest to form Louis Comfort Tiffany and Associated American Artists. The business lasted only four years. The group made designs for wallpaper, furniture, and textiles. In 1881, Tiffany did the interior design of the Mark Twain House in Hartford, Connecticut, which still remains.

The new firm's most notable work came in 1882 when U.S. president Chester Alan Arthur refused to move into the White House until it had been redecorated. Arthur commissioned Tiffany, who began to make a name for himself in New York City society for the firm's interior design work, to redo the state rooms, which Arthur found charmless. Tiffany worked on the East Room, the Blue Room, the Red Room, the State Dining Room, and the Entrance Hall, refurnishing, repainting in decorative patterns, installing newly designed mantelpieces, changing to wallpaper with dense patterns, and adding Tiffany glass to gaslight fixtures and windows and adding an opalescent floor-to-ceiling glass screen in the Entrance Hall. The Tiffany screen and other Victorian additions were all removed in the Roosevelt renovations of 1902, which restored the White House interiors to Federal style in keeping with its architecture.

== Tiffany Studios ==
After Tiffany had formed a partnership with Colman, Lockwood DeForest, and Candace Wheeler, and after having incorporated the interior decorating firm of L.C. Tiffany & Associated Artists, a desire to concentrate on art in glass led Tiffany to choose to establish his own glassmaking firm. The first Tiffany Glass Company was incorporated on December 1, 1885. It became the Tiffany Glass & Decorating Company in 1892, and the Tiffany Studios in 1900. He had used commercial glass houses for 19 years to supply his Manhattan showroom and clients, but wanted to be fully in charge of production and design security. Finally, in 1892 he founded his own glassworks, the Louis C. Tiffany Furnaces in Corona Queens. As a youth Tiffany had attended the Flushing Institute, on Roosevelt Avenue between Main and Union Streets, where Macy's department store now sits. Tiffany was keenly aware of the area's potential and for his furnaces to succeed, he needed to hire the town's pool of experienced immigrant workers, who were then mostly Italian, German, and Irish." Tiffany experimented with glass. Sand for glassmaking was abundantly available at nearby Oyster Bay. Tiffany would eventually oversee two hundred artisans. Among them, Clara Driscoll, whose dragonfly lamp won a prize in the 1900 Paris Exposition, was by 1904 one of the highest paid women in the world. Even some of Tiffany's artists were foreigners, such as Venetian-born Andrea Boldini, and both Englishmen Joseph Briggs and Arthur J. Nash.

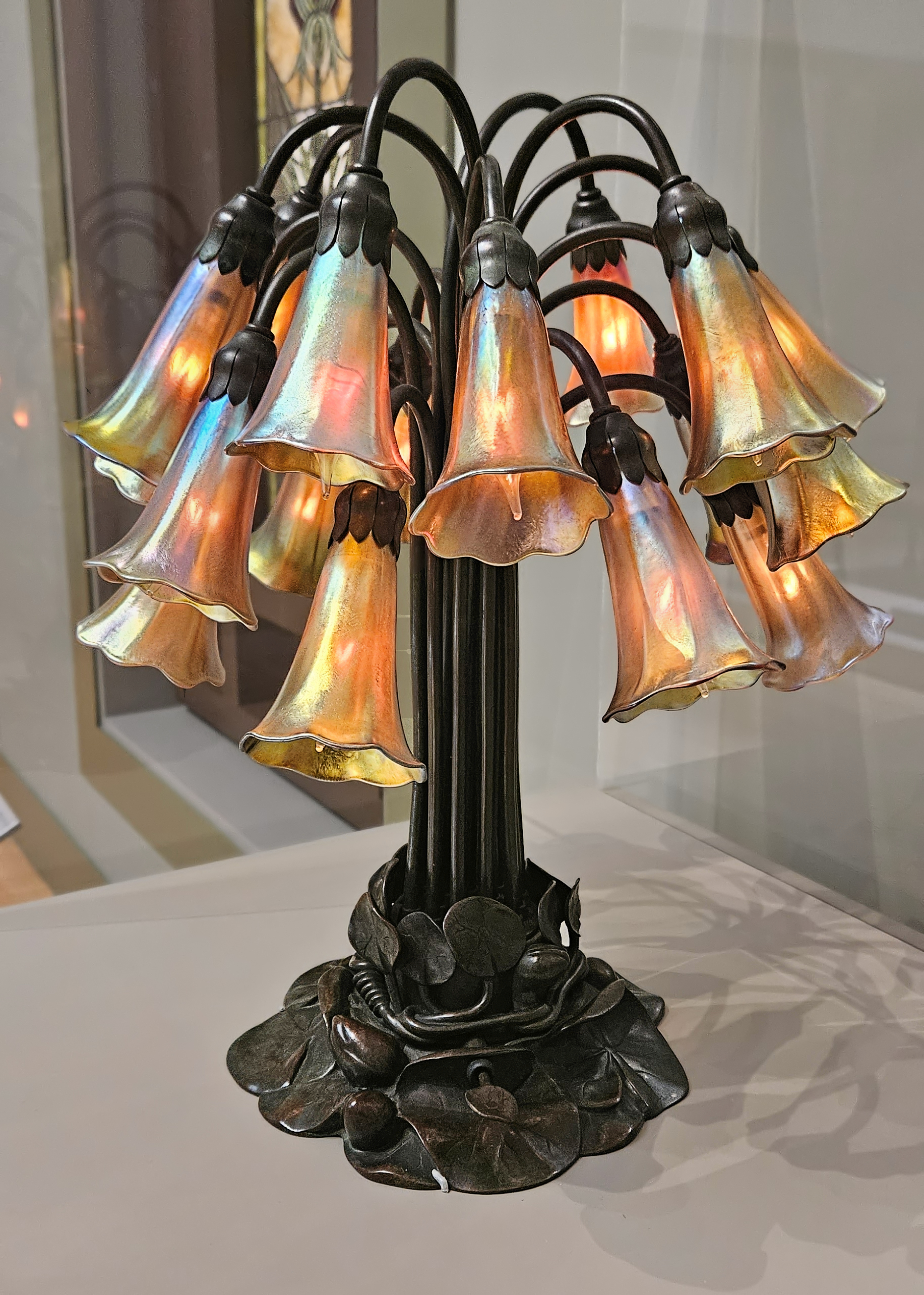
Lily lamp design exhibited at the Paris Exposition Universelle in 1900

With Tiffany later opening his own glass factory in Corona, New York, he was determined to provide designs that improved the quality of contemporary glass. The factory was the old Tiffany Studios in Corona, Queens, at the southwest corner of 43rd Avenue and 97th place, where it was used to cast art sculptures of bronze designs for sculptors, and bronze architectural elements such as floor registers, door jambs, window casings, lamps, and sconces, most notably for Tiffany. The building had undergone a metamorphosis of name changes, beginning with the Tiffany Glass and Decorating Company, in 1892. In 1893, Tiffany built a new factory called the Stourbridge Glass Company, later called Tiffany Glass Furnaces, which was located in Corona, Queens, hiring the Englishman Arthur J. Nash to oversee it. In 1893, his company also introduced the term Favrile in conjunction with his first production of blown glass at his new glass factory. Some early examples of his lamps were exhibited in the 1893 World's Fair in Chicago.

At the beginning of his career, Tiffany used cheap jelly jars and bottles because they had the mineral impurities that finer glass lacked. When he was unable to convince fine glassmakers to leave the impurities in, he began making his own glass. Tiffany used opalescent glass in a variety of colors and textures to create a unique style of stained glass. Tiffany acquired Stanford Bray's patent for the "copper foil" technique, which, by edging each piece of cut glass in copper foil and soldering the whole together to create his windows and lamps, made possible a level of detail previously unknown. This can be contrasted with the method of painting in enamels or glass paint on colorless glass, and then setting the glass pieces in lead channels, which had been the dominant method of creating stained glass for hundreds of years in Europe.

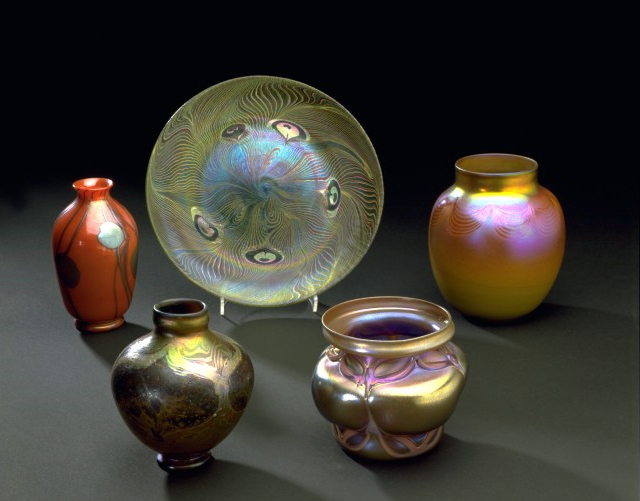
Favrile glass specimens from 1896 to 1902

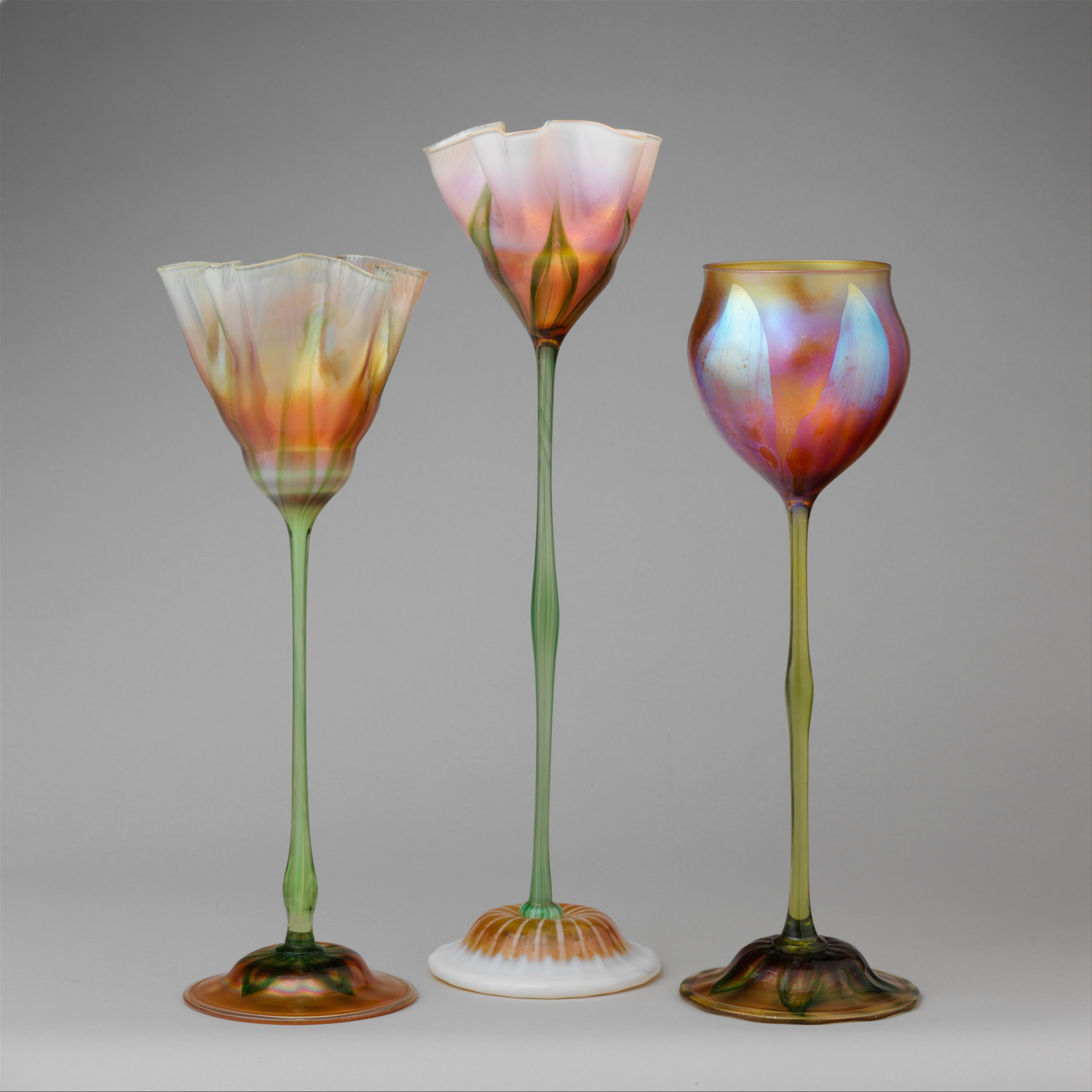
Favrile glass vases, 1900–02

Tiffany trademarked Favrile (from the old French word for handmade) on November 13, 1894. He later used this word to apply to all of his glass, enamel and pottery. "Tiffany's favrile glass vases were based on Venetian glassmaking techniques mixed with ancient Egyptian and Near Eastern inspirations." Tiffany delved into glass-making with interest in Venetian glass-maker Antonio Salviati. Tiffany would study techniques from Salviati-trained glassmaker, Andrea Boldini. In 1902, Tiffany had been influenced by a Cypriote line of jewelry that his father, Charles Lewis Tiffany, had introduced earlier at the Turin World's Fair. He coined this particular line of favrile glass the Cypriote line.

Tiffany's first commercially produced lamps date from around 1895. Much of his company's production was in making stained glass windows and Tiffany lamps, but his company designed a complete range of interior decorations. At its peak, his factory employed more than 300 artisans. "Within this complex, Tiffany carried out experiments in glass colors and pottery glazing, perfected techniques of assembling stained glass windows."

In 1889, at the Paris Exposition, Tiffany was said to have been "overwhelmed" by the glass work of Émile Gallé, French Art Nouveau artisan. In 1900, at the Exposition Universelle in Paris, he won a gold medal with his stained glass windows The Four Seasons.

“By 1901, Tiffany was at the peak of his profession. "At his father's death in 1902, came into an inheritance equivalent today to more than $20 million. At age fifty-four, he was appointed the first design director and vice president of Tiffany & Co., taking on leading roles in the famous jewelry firm as well as continuing in his own enterprises. Also in 1902 Tiffany formally adopted the trademark Tiffany Studios for all works made in Corona, though the imprint had apparently been used earlier."

From October 22, 2026 to February 7, 2027, the Metropolitan Museum of Art exhibited Designing the Gilded Age: Drawings from the Studios of Louis C. Tiffany displaying watercolors and drawings the studio produced in connection commissions during the Gilded Age. The exhibit was accompanied with a catalog by Alice Cooney Frelinghuysen (ISBN 978-1-588-39821-5). The Museum displayed a selection of advertising materials in a companion exhibit Marketing the Gilded Age: Advertising Publications from the Studios of Louis C. Tiffany.

=== Tiffany Artisans ===
By 1902, Louis C. Tiffany had "several highly-gifted assistants working under his direction: Arthur J. Nash in glass; Clara Driscoll in leaded-glass lamps, windows, and mosaic design; Frederick Wilson in ecclesiastical stained-glass windows; and Julia Halsey Munson in enamels and jewelry design. Tiffany interiors also made considerable use of mosaics. The mosaics workshop, largely staffed by women, was overseen until 1898 by the Swiss-born sculptor and designer Jacob Adolphus Holzer.

==== Arthur J. Nash ====
Arthur J. Nash had been manager of a major glassworks in Stourbridge, England. Tiffany persuaded Nash to join him in founding and heading a new firm in Corona, Queens, first called the Stourbridge Glass Company, and later in 1902 renamed Tiffany Furnaces. At Stourbridge Glass Company Nash developed Favrile glass, which Tiffany became known for. "In 1920, Tiffany's glass production was reorganized under Nash's son, A. Douglas Nash, as part of Louis C. Tiffany Furnaces, Inc.; and, as in the case of the metal shop under Arthur Nash's other son, Leslie Nash, the production turned to more commercial table and other wares." In 1922, Leslie Nash, a creative artist and designer in his own right, had a major influence on Tiffany's production. "In 1922, in the waning period of Tiffany Furnaces, Tiffany and Leslie Nash—inspired by motifs from King Tutankhamen's recently discovered tomb—designed an elaborate special order," for the wife of Chicago millionaire Cyrus McCormick. In 1928, Tiffany Furnaces ceased operations due to financial difficulties. Arthur Nash retired after 1918, and "with him retired the secrets of making the finest and most technically complicated types of Tiffany glass, which remain to this day one of the crowning achievements of the decorative arts in America."

==== Clara Driscoll ====
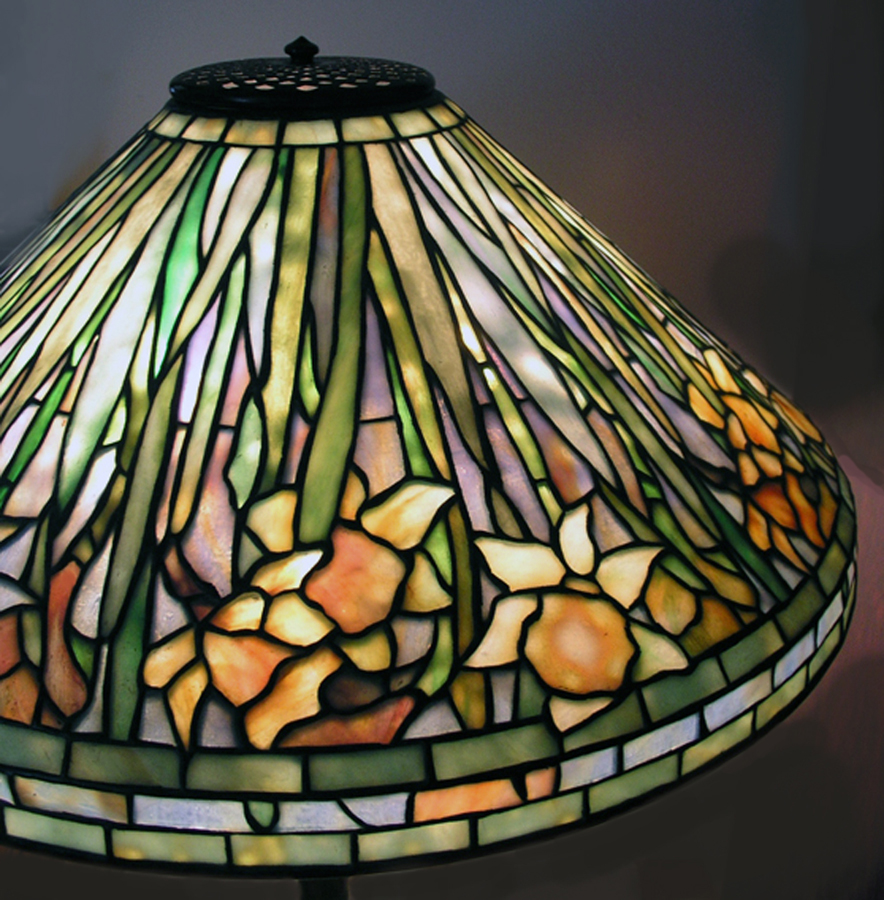
Tiffany Studios Daffodil stained glass leaded lampshade, now known to be one of head designer Clara Driscoll's creations

"A gifted unsung artist," Clara Driscoll was one of the many accomplished artists employed by Tiffany. Driscoll was born in Tallmadge, Ohio. Driscoll was educated at the Western Reserve School of Design for Women, and in 1888 moved to New York City to study at the Metropolitan Museum of Art School. "The turning point in her career came when she and her sister found employment at the Tiffany Glass Company in Manhattan." When Driscoll first began work at Tiffany's the firm was located at 333-35 Fourth Avenue, later renamed for its lush-green central median, Park Avenue. The names of the firm underwent a metamorphosis of name changes, as had Tiffany's glass operation with Nash: Louis C. Tiffany and Associated Artists, to Louis C. Tiffany & Co., and finally the Tiffany Glass Company. "As the name suggests, the company focused largely on leaded-glass windows but it also received commissions for interior decoration."

Recent research by Rutgers University professor Martin Eidelberg suggests that a team of talented single women designers, sometimes referred to as the "Tiffany Girls", led by Driscoll, played a big role in designing many of the floral patterns on the famous Tiffany lamp and other creations.

From the late 1880s until about 1909, Driscoll supervised many of Tiffany's most celebrated leaded windows and mosaics. Since the common practice at the time was to limit female hires to unmarried status, Driscoll worked on and off on three separate occasions. During Driscoll's first term in 1892, a "Women's Glass Cutting Department" with six female employees under Driscoll's direction was created, and in two years, this had increased to thirty-five. Her third term at Tiffany's, "undoubtedly the most creative" tenure of her career, was the period many refer to as "the most prestigious commissions for leaded-glass windows and mosaics by her "Tiffany Girls." It was during this tenure that iconic pieces like the Dragonfly, Wisteria, and Poppy lamp shades were created. Undoubtedly, the magic in the artistic endeavors by Tiffany and his artisans can only be ascribed to the "harmony that existed between Tiffany and his workers."

==== Frederick Wilson ====
"The Sower", designed by Frederick Wilson: one of 25 in situ Tiffany windows at St. Peter's Chapel, Mare Island

Frederick Wilson started at Tiffany Studios in 1893, became its chief window designer in 1897, and head of the Ecclesiastical Department in 1899. He was among the most prominent and prolific designers: e.g., The Righteous Shall Receive a Crown of Glory (1901); Angel of the Resurrection (1904); The Prayer of the Christian Soldier (1919). He worked in his studio at Briarcliff Manor, New York, as well as in the Tiffany Studios factory at Corona, Queens. After 30 years and more than 500 windows designed and executed, he left Tiffany Studios in 1923 and moved to Los Angeles to work for Judson Studios.

==== Julia Halsey Munson ====
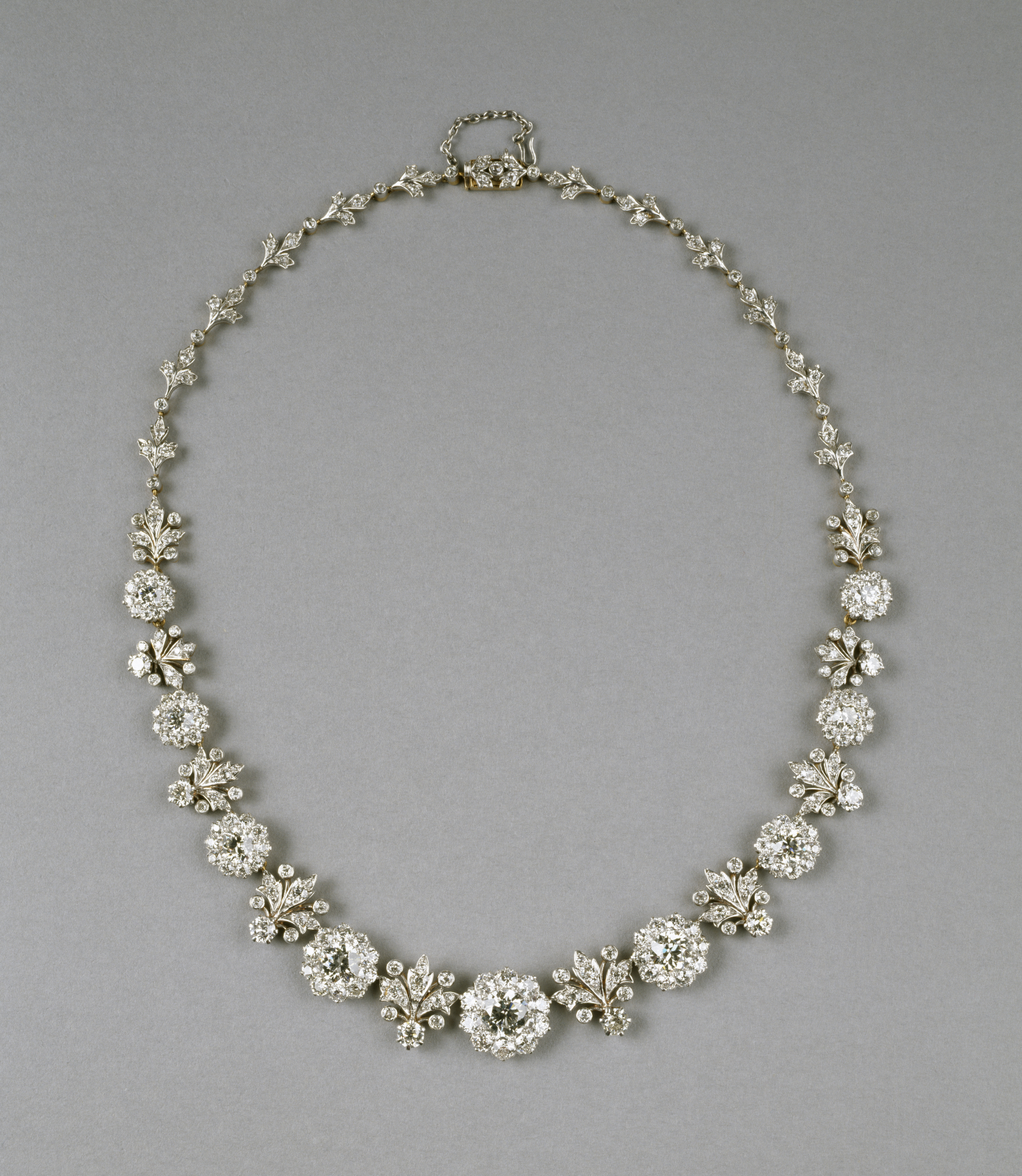
This necklace exemplifies Tiffany & Co.'s jewelry production around the turn of the 20th century. Necklace circa 1904.

Julia Munson was born in Hoboken, New Jersey, in 1875. Munson was trained at the Artist-Artisan Institute of New York. Munson's drawings, preserved in Tiffany & Co. archives, exhibit abstract attention to nature's beauty, namely plants and flowers inspired by Tiffany's glassworks. "The idea of Tiffany's enamels as the link between his stained-glass windows and his jewelry for Tiffany & Co. is well founded. "During the twelve years they collaborated on jewelry, they maintained the practice of taking themes from Tiffany's glass, mosaics, and metalwork, creating jewels that women sought around the world." Although Tiffany's lamps are his most well-known artistic creations, his unique jewelry, characterised by vibrant colors, unusual stones, and exotic motifs, has also become sought after by collectors of fine jewelry.

In 1903, Julia Munson became the head of Tiffany & Co.'s jewelry department. She played an important role in developing the enameling techniques used in Tiffany's jewelry, although her significant contributions remained largely unrecognized at the time, as none of the pieces she worked on were signed.

==== Agnes Northrop ====
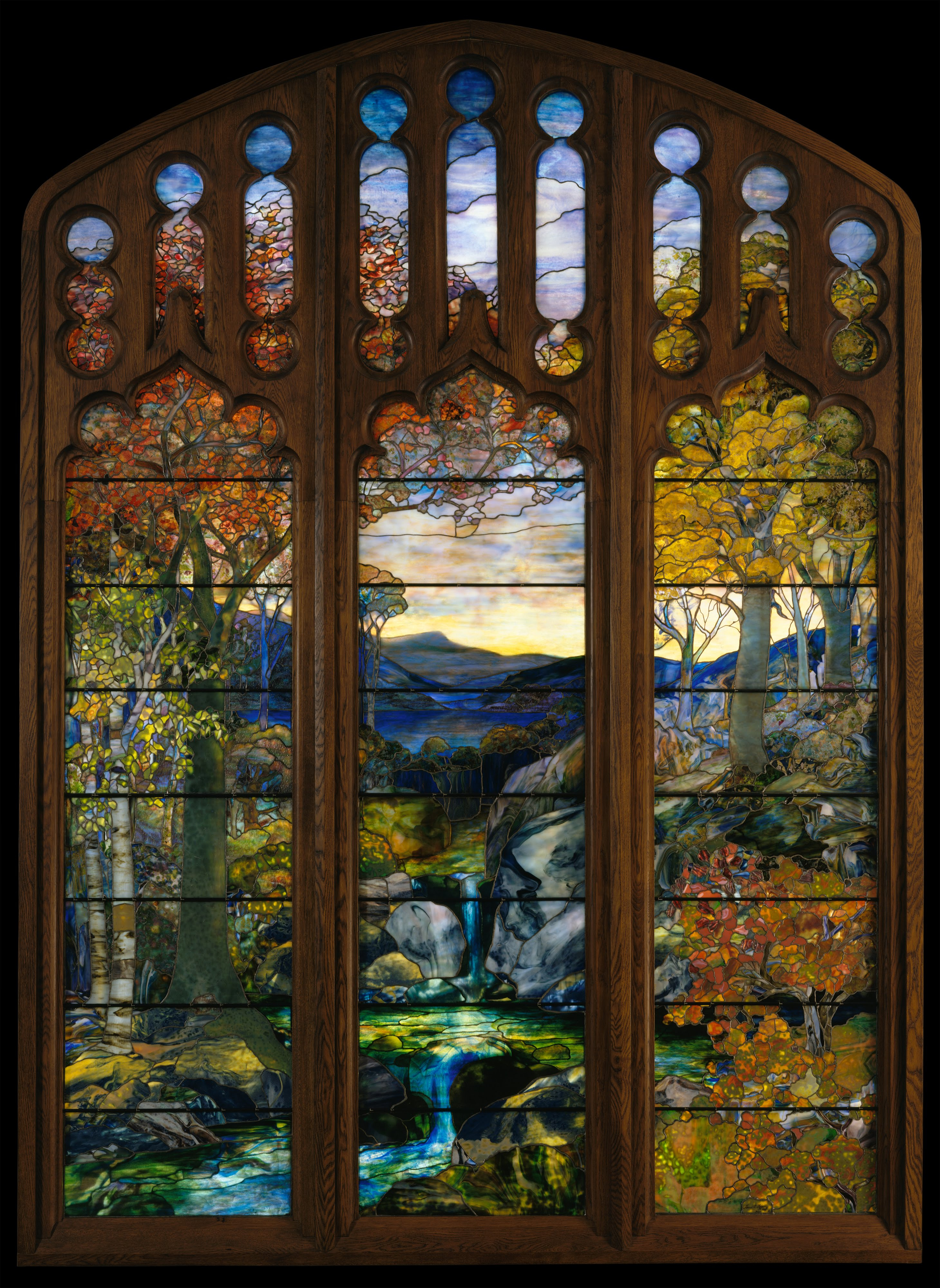
Autumn Landscape, circa 1923–1924, designed by Agnes Northrup

Agnes Northrop (1857 – 1953) started as a "Tiffany Girl" and became a designer. In 2024 the Metropolitan Museum of Art acquired her stained glass triptych entitled Garden Landscape.

=== Finality ===
Tiffany's glass fell out of favor in the 1910s, and by the 1920s a foundry had been installed for a separate bronze company. Tiffany's leadership and talent, as well as his father's money and old firm, allowed Tiffany to relaunch Tiffany Studios as a marketing strategy for his business to thrive. In 1924 the firm underwent a name change, and was renamed the A. Douglas Nash Company. Leslie Nash states that they "made glass for only one and a half years" which would suggest that the firm stopped producing favrile glass by 1927 or the latest by 1929. Leslie Nash, son of Arthur Nash, describes the ultimate demise of the company in the context of the Great Depression:

A Directors meeting was called—the auditors read the statement—which showed us in the red more than $400,000—a very heavy loss. It was voted to go into voluntary bankruptcy. Mr. Tiffany bought in all the stock at par, paid all outstanding indebtedness—and the famous Glass business was closed forever. Shortly following, the Tiffany Studios with all its departments did the same thing.

— Leslie Nash, Behind the Scenes of Tiffany Glassmaking, p. 13

In 1932, Tiffany Studios filed for bankruptcy. Ownership of the complex passed back to the original owners of the factory — the Roman Bronze Works — which had served as a subcontractor to Tiffany for many years.” John Polachek, founder of the General Bronze Corporation —who had worked at the Tiffany Studios earlier— purchased the Roman Bronze Works (the old Tiffany Studios). General Bronze then became the largest bronze fabricator in New York City formed through the merger of his own companies and Tiffany's Corona factory. Today, the Louis Tiffany School or New York City's P.S. (public school) 110Q, is now built on that site.

=== Controversy ===
The relations between Louis C. Tiffany and his highly-gifted artisans—such as between Arthur Nash and his family business relationships with Tiffany; or Clara Driscoll, his head designer for lamps and stained-glass windows—will probably never be known. Clara Driscoll's work was never once publicly acknowledged. Arthur Nash, who served as the head of Tiffany's glassworks, was never once publicly acknowledged either. They have been under scrutiny ever since Tiffany retired after the stock market crash of 1929.

When the firm was obliged to disclose the names of individual workers to juries, as at the Paris World's Fair of 1900, it complied and, in fact, both Clara Driscoll and Arthur Nash as well as others received prizes. Nonetheless, their individual awards were never publicized, but Tiffany's were.

— Martin Eidelberg, Nina Gray, Margaret Hofer, A New Light on Tiffany — Clara Driscoll and the Tiffany Girls, p. 12

"The exact nature of Arthur Nash's business relation to Tiffany remains problematic. That [one firm] was named the Stourbridge Glass Company in deference to Arthur Nash's previous work in England suggests Nash's eminence and influence."

The documentary evidence shows that at two points in its early history, on June 26 and September 13, 1893, the Stourbridge Glass Company sought financing by issuing additional stock. It was then that Louis C. Tiffany's father became a stockholder and Louis himself was designated as president.

— Martin Eidelberg & Nancy A. McClelland, Behind the Scenes of Tiffany Glassmaking, p. 7

It would appear that contracts negotiated between Tiffany and Nash's Stourbridge Glass Co. limited Nash's artistic control, and that, "there was a phrase that gave Louis C. Tiffany artistic control. Until then, Louis Tiffany's name had not appeared on the company's documents, but suddenly he was listed as president." On January 6, 1920, the firm was incorporated as the Louis C. Tiffany Furnaces, Inc. At this time, Tiffany was still president, but most of his shares had been already transferred to the charitable foundations for artists that he had legally set up in his name. After this, the Nash family — Arthur J., and his two sons, A. Douglas and Leslie — owned a large block of the company. The closing of the factory has also been a matter of some debate. Overall, findings would suggest that the factory closed circa 1929–1930. Louis Tiffany subsequently died in 1933.

Nash's work was done anonymously and under Tiffany's shadow. Yet, had there not been a Tiffany, there would have been no Nash.

— Martin Eidelberg, Nina Gray, Margaret Hofer, A New Light on Tiffany — Clara Driscoll and the Tiffany Girls, p. 24

== Tiffany & Co. ==
In 1902, Tiffany became the first design director for Tiffany & Co., the jewelry company founded by his father. 1911 saw the installation of an enormous glass curtain fabricated for the Palacio de Bellas Artes in Mexico City. It is considered by some to be a masterpiece. Tiffany used all his skills in the design of his own house, the 84-room Laurelton Hall, in the village of Laurel Hollow, on Long Island, New York, completed in 1905. Later this estate was donated to his foundation for art students along with 60 acres (243,000 m^{2}) of land, sold in 1949, and destroyed by a fire in 1957. Aside from his fame for glass and jewelry design, Tiffany also designed what we know today as the New York Yankees logo, originally used in 1877 as part of the NYPD's Medal of Valor.

== Personal life ==
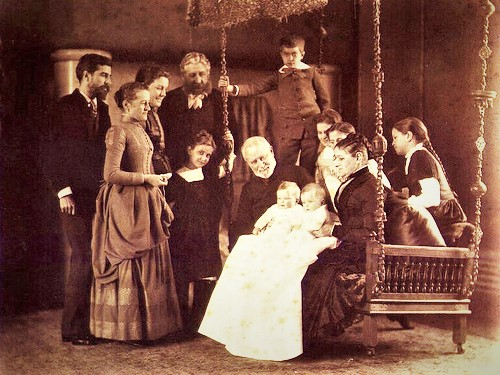
Tiffany (far left), holding his twin daughters Louise and Julia, along with his parents (seated)

Tiffany married Mary Woodbridge Goddard on May 15, 1872, in Norwich, Connecticut, and had four children:

- Mary Woodbridge Tiffany (1873–1963) who married Graham Lusk;
- Charles Louis Tiffany I (1874–1874);
- Charles Louis Tiffany II (1878–1947) who married Katrina Brandes Ely;
- Hilda Goddard Tiffany (1879–1908), the youngest.

After the death of his wife, he married Louise Wakeman Knox (1851–1904) on November 9, 1886. They had four children:

- Louise Comfort Tiffany (1887–1974), who married Rodman Drake DeKay Gilder;
- Julia DeForest Tiffany (1887–1973), who married Gurdon S. Parker then married Francis Minot Weld;
- Annie Olivia Tiffany (1888–1892); and
- Dorothy Trimble Tiffany (1891–1979), who, as Dorothy Burlingham, later became a noted psychoanalyst and lifelong friend and partner of Anna Freud.

=== Laurelton Hall ===
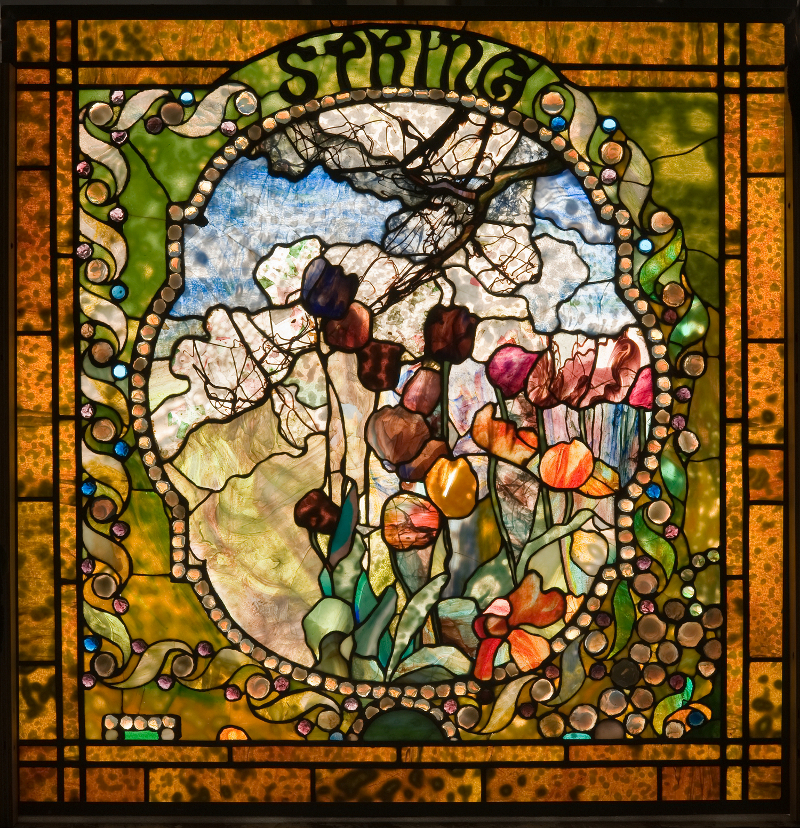
Spring panel from the Four Seasons leaded-glass window, from Laurelton Hall

Tiffany had designed and built Laurelton Hall, but it has long since been demolished. It was situated in the village of Laurel Hollow in the town of Oyster Bay on Long Island, New York. It was built as an 84-room mansion on 600 acres of land, designed in classic Art Nouveau style. "Laurelton was ever-evolving," according to Alice Frelinghuysen. The house, as well as the gardens, both manifested and embodied Tiffany's artistic expression. "He filled museum-style cases with hundreds of the best examples of his own glass vases. pottery, enamelware, juxtaposed with Roman and Syrian glass, Egyptian jewelry, and Near Eastern ceramics and tiles." Tiffany hung a selection of paintings in Laurelton Hall. In the main house he displayed a range of paintings, including only two European artists. For the dining room he purchased a painting of ducks by Alexander Koester. He also purchased four paintings by Joaquín Sorolla, who he commissioned for a portrait.

== Death ==
Tiffany died on January 17, 1933, and is interred in Green-Wood Cemetery in Brooklyn, New York City. Tiffany is the great-grandfather of investor George Gilder.

== Societies ==
- American Watercolor Society
- Architectural League
- Chevalier of the Legion of Honour in 1900
- Imperial Society of Fine Arts (Tokyo)
- National Academy of Design in 1880
- New York Society of Fine Arts
- Société Nationale des Beaux-Arts (Paris)
- Society of American Artists in 1877 Source:

== Awards and honors ==
- 1893: 44 medals, World Columbian Exposition (Chicago)
- 1900: gold medal, Chevalier of the Legion of Honour (France)
- 1900: grand prix, Paris Exposition
- 1901: grand prix, St. Petersburg Exposition
- 1901: gold medal, Buffalo Exposition
- 1901: gold medal, Dresden Exposition
- 1902: gold medal and special diploma, Turin Exposition
- 1904: gold medal, Louisiana Purchase Exposition in St. Louis
- 1907: gold medal, Jamestown Exposition
- 1909: grand prize, Seattle Exposition
- 1915: gold medal, Panama Exposition
- 1926: gold medal, Philadelphia Sesquicentennial Exposition

== Collections ==
The Charles Hosmer Morse Museum of American Art in Winter Park, Florida, houses the world's most comprehensive collection of the works of Louis Comfort Tiffany, including Tiffany jewelry, pottery, paintings, art glass, leaded-glass windows, lamps, and the Tiffany Chapel he designed for the 1893 World's Columbian Exposition in Chicago. After the close of the exposition, a benefactor purchased the entire chapel for installation in the crypt of the Cathedral of Saint John the Divine, New York in New York City. As construction on the cathedral continued, the chapel fell into disuse, and in 1916, Tiffany removed the bulk of it to Laurelton Hall. After a 1957 fire, Hugh McKean, a former art student in 1930 at Laurelton Hall, and his wife Jeannette Genius McKean rescued the chapel, which now occupies an entire wing of the Morse Museum which they founded. Many glass panels from Laurelton Hall are also there; for many years some were on display in local restaurants and businesses in Central Florida. Some were replaced by full-scale color transparencies after the museum opened.

In November 2006, a major exhibit about Laurelton Hall, Louis Comfort Tiffany and Laurelton Hall: An Artist's Country Estate, opened at the Metropolitan Museum of Art in New York City. In 2007, an exhibit at the New-York Historical Society featured new information about the women who worked for Tiffany and their contribution to designs credited to Tiffany; the Society holds and exhibits a major collection of Tiffany's work. Since 1995, the Queens Museum of Art has featured a permanent collection of Tiffany objects, which continues Tiffany's presence in Corona, Queens where the company's studios were once located. Reid Memorial Presbyterian Church in Richmond, Indiana, has a collection of 62 Tiffany windows which are still their original placements, but the church is deteriorating and in jeopardy.

In 1906, Tiffany created stained glass windows for the Stanford White-designed Madison Square Presbyterian Church located on Madison Avenue in Manhattan, New York City. The church was Tiffany's place of worship, and was torn down in 1919 after the Metropolitan Life Insurance Company bought the land to build their new headquarters. Tiffany had inserted a clause in his contract stipulating that if the church were ever to be demolished, then ownership of the windows would revert to him.

Tiffany enjoyed staying at the Mission Inn in Riverside, California, and had become friends with the founder of the Mission Inn, Frank Augustus Miller, so, after meeting with Miller in New York, Tiffany shipped the windows to the Mission Inn; they arrived there in 1924, and were stored until the inn's St. Francis Chapel was completed in 1931. There are six rectangular windows and a 104” diameter window in the rear of the chapel, as well as another 104” diameter window is in the Galeria next to the chapel. A smaller window entitled “Monk At The Organ” featuring a Franciscan friar, is in St Cecelia's Chapel, a wedding chapel, and is engraved with Tiffany's signature. The St Francis Chapel was designed with the intent of prominently displaying Tiffany's windows. The Arlington Street Church in Boston has 16 Tiffany windows of a set of 20, designed by Frederick Wilson (1858–1932), Tiffany's chief designer for ecclesiastical windows. They were gradually installed between 1889 and 1929. The church archives include designs for 4 additional windows which were never commissioned due to financial constraints caused by the Great Depression. When funds again became available, Tiffany Studios had gone out of business and its stockpile of glass had been dispersed and lost, ending the prospect of completing the set. Also in the Back Bay district of Boston is Frederick Ayer Mansion, one of three surviving examples of Tiffany interiors, and the only surviving building also possessing exterior mosaics designed by Tiffany.

The Pine Street Baptist Church in Providence, Rhode Island, was opened in 1917 at Lloyd and Wayland Street as Central Baptist and in 2003, became known as Community Church of Providence. Between 1917 and 2018 the church featured a large Tiffany stained glass memorial to Frederick W. Hartwell that was created by Agnes F. Northrop and entitled "Light in Heaven and Earth". The complex work, considered "one of the largest and finest landscape windows ever produced by Tiffany Studios", largely was overlooked in the community. In 2018, the church sold the window to the Art Institute of Chicago. After conservation and preparation, it will be displayed prominently as the Hartwell Memorial Window.

Significant collections of Tiffany windows outside the United States are the 17 windows in the former Erskine and American United Church, now part of the Montreal Museum of Fine Arts in Montreal, Canada, and the two windows in the American Church in Paris, on the Quai d'Orsay, which have been classified as National Monuments by the French government; these were commissioned by Rodman Wanamaker in 1901 for the original American Church building on the right bank of the Seine.

The Haworth Art Gallery in Accrington, England, contains a collection of more than 140 examples of the work of Louis Comfort Tiffany, including vases, tiles, lamps, and mosaics. The collection, which claims to be the largest collection of publicly owned Tiffany glass outside of the United States, contains a fine example of an Aquamarine vase and the noted Sulphur Crested Cockatoos mosaic.

== Gallery ==
Stained glass windows

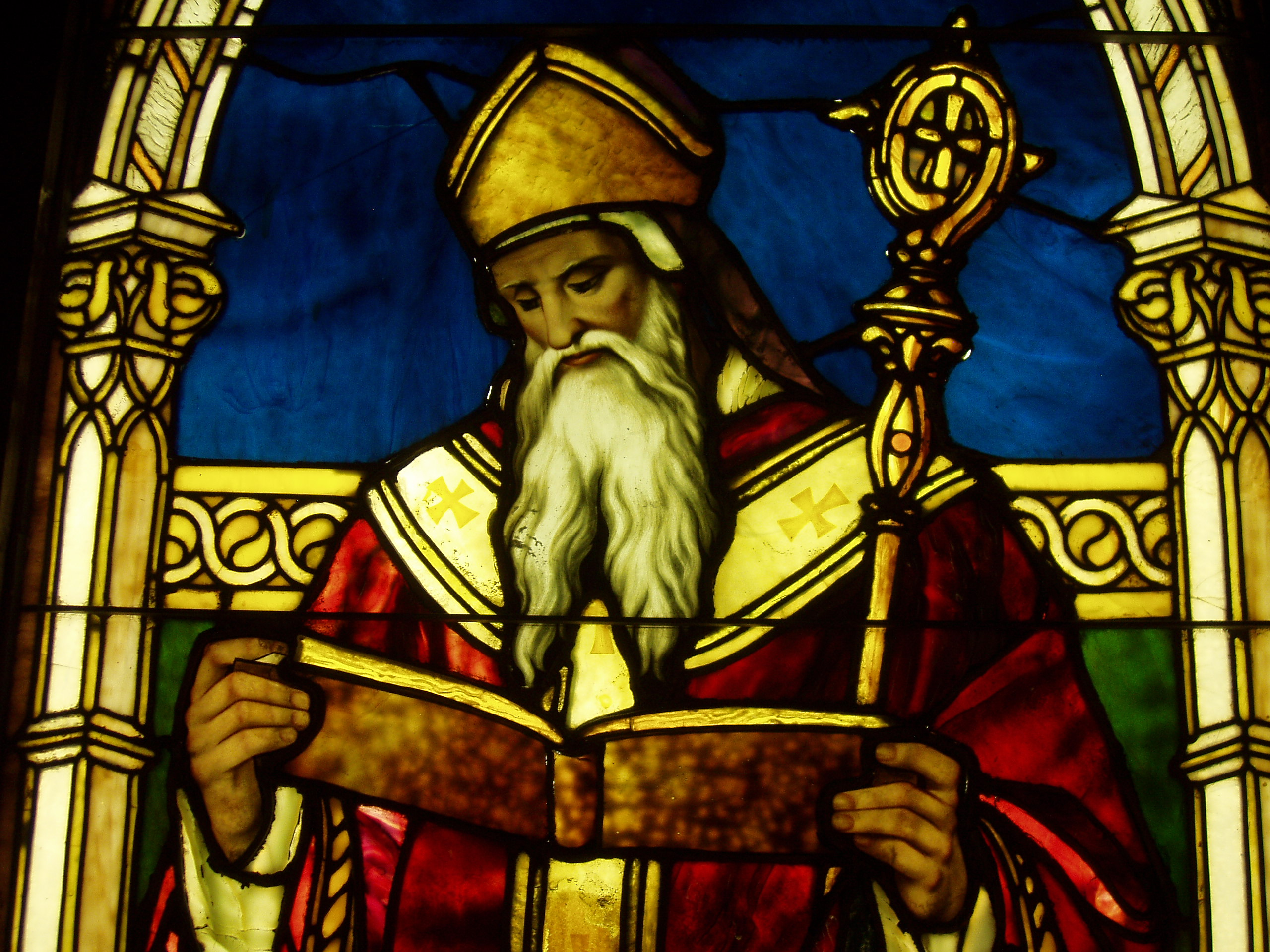
Window of St. Augustine, in the Lightner Museum, St. Augustine, Florida

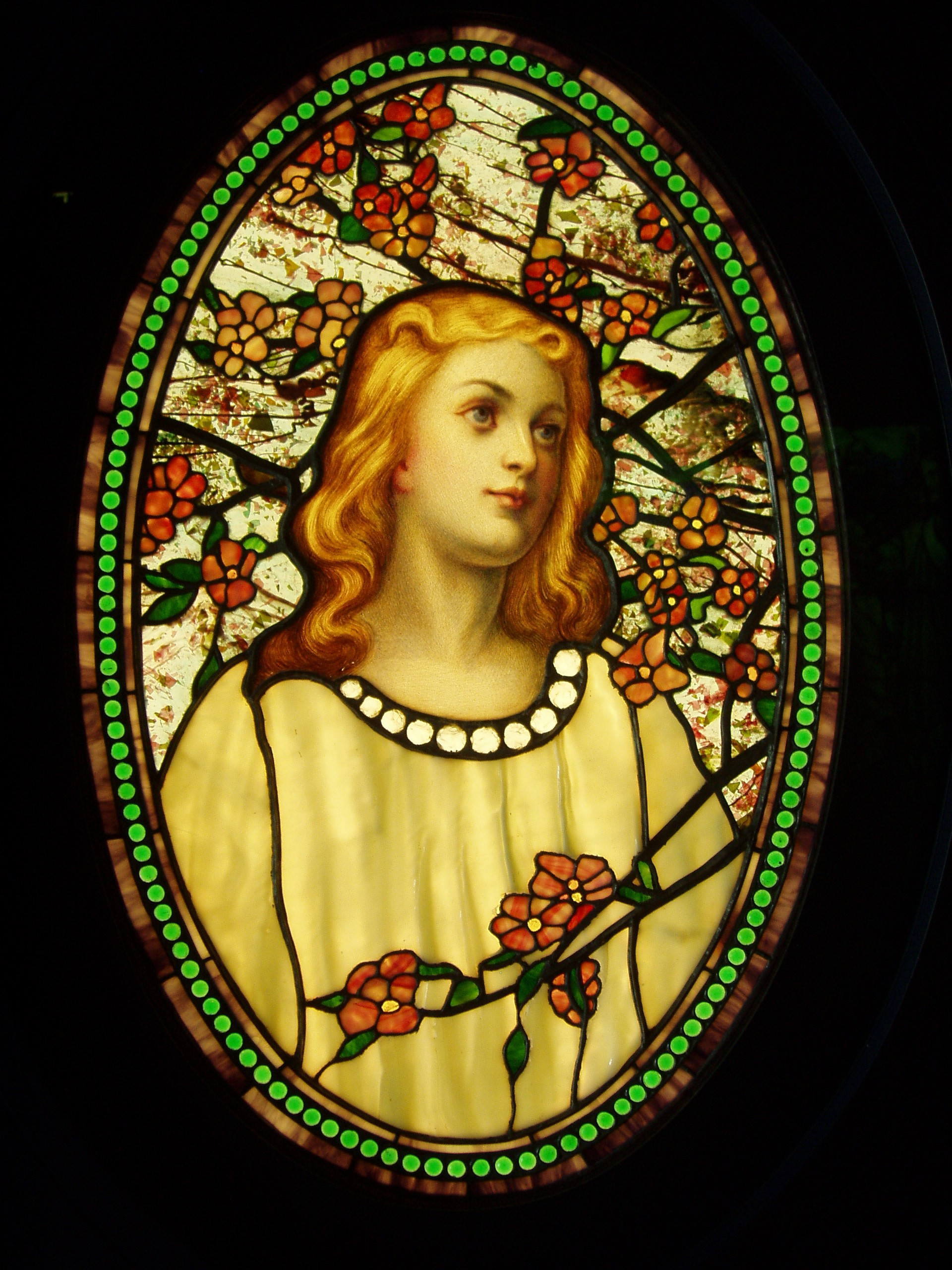
Girl with Cherry Blossoms (c. 1890)

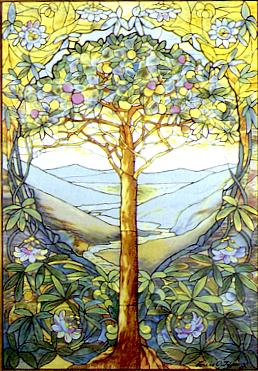
The Tree of Life stained glass

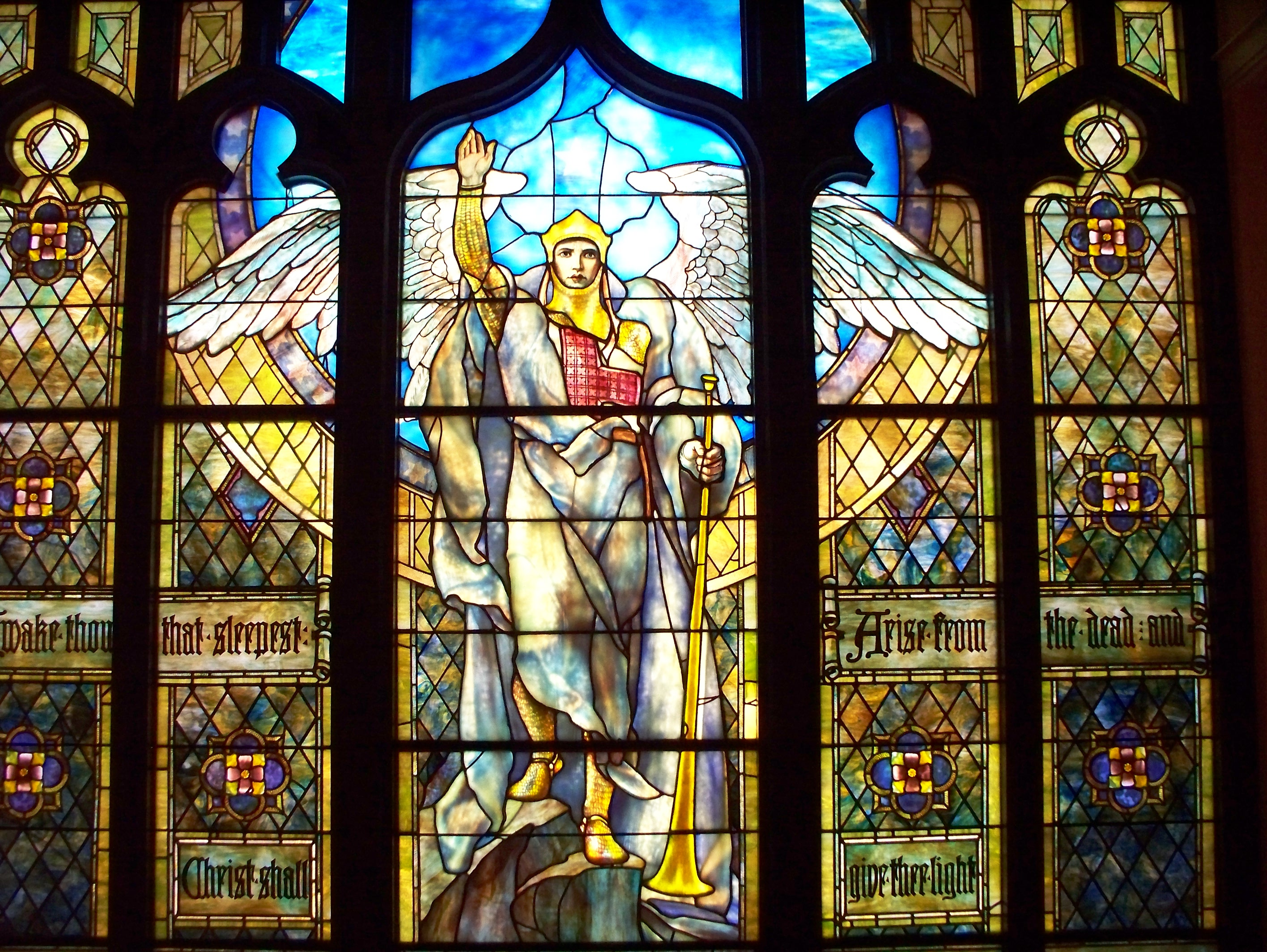
Angel of the Resurrection (1904), in the Indianapolis Museum of Art

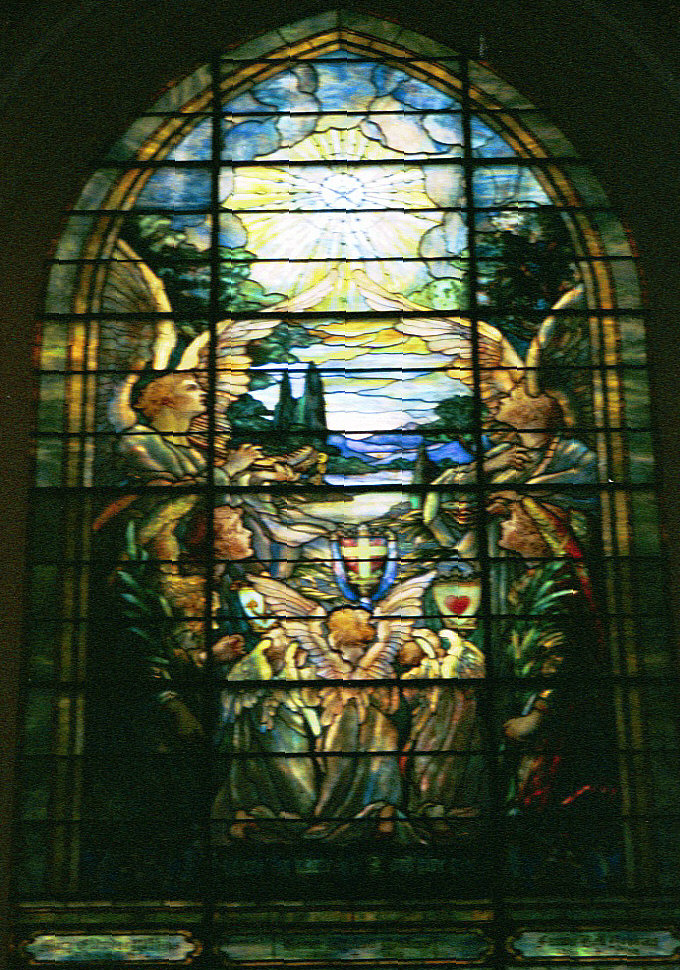
The New Creation, at Brown Memorial Presbyterian Church, Baltimore

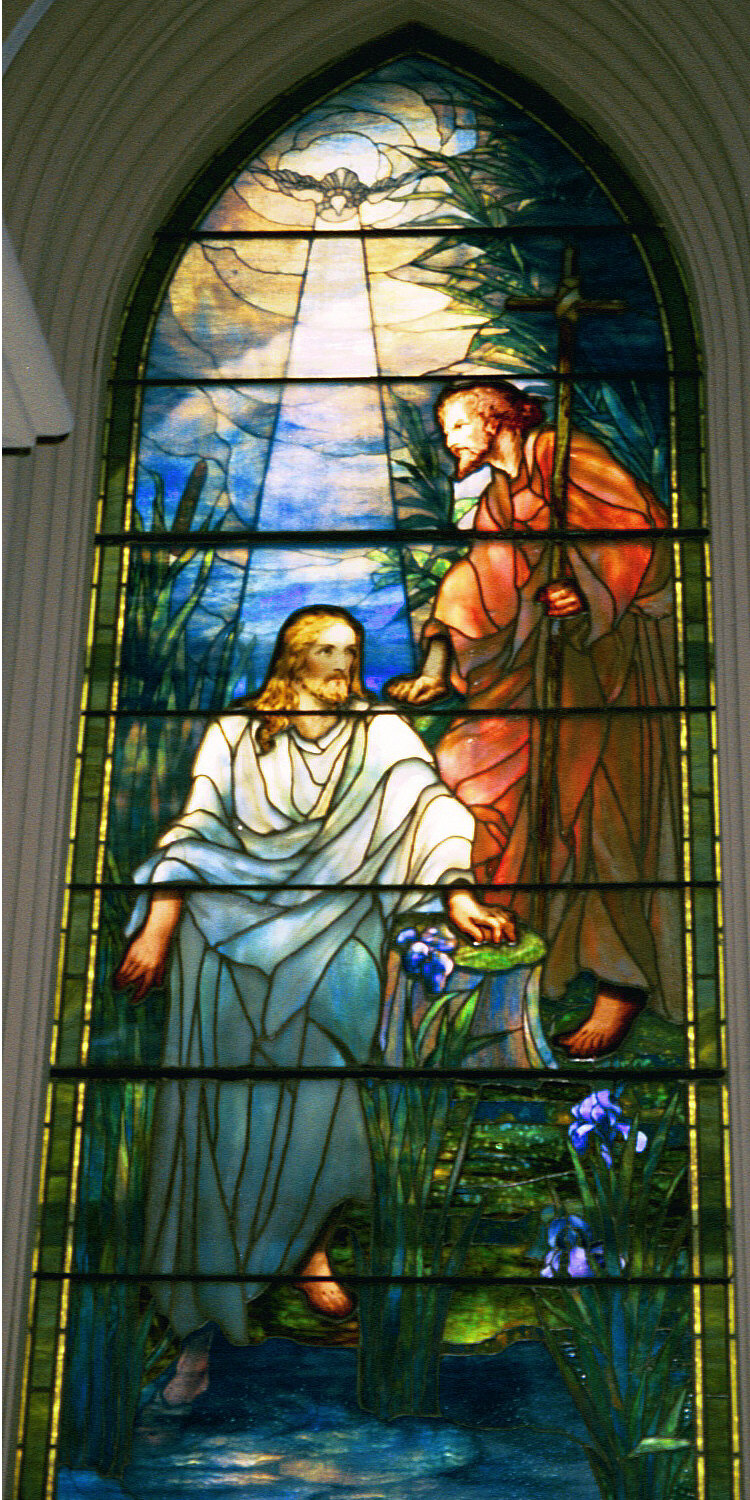
The Baptism of Christ, at Brown Memorial

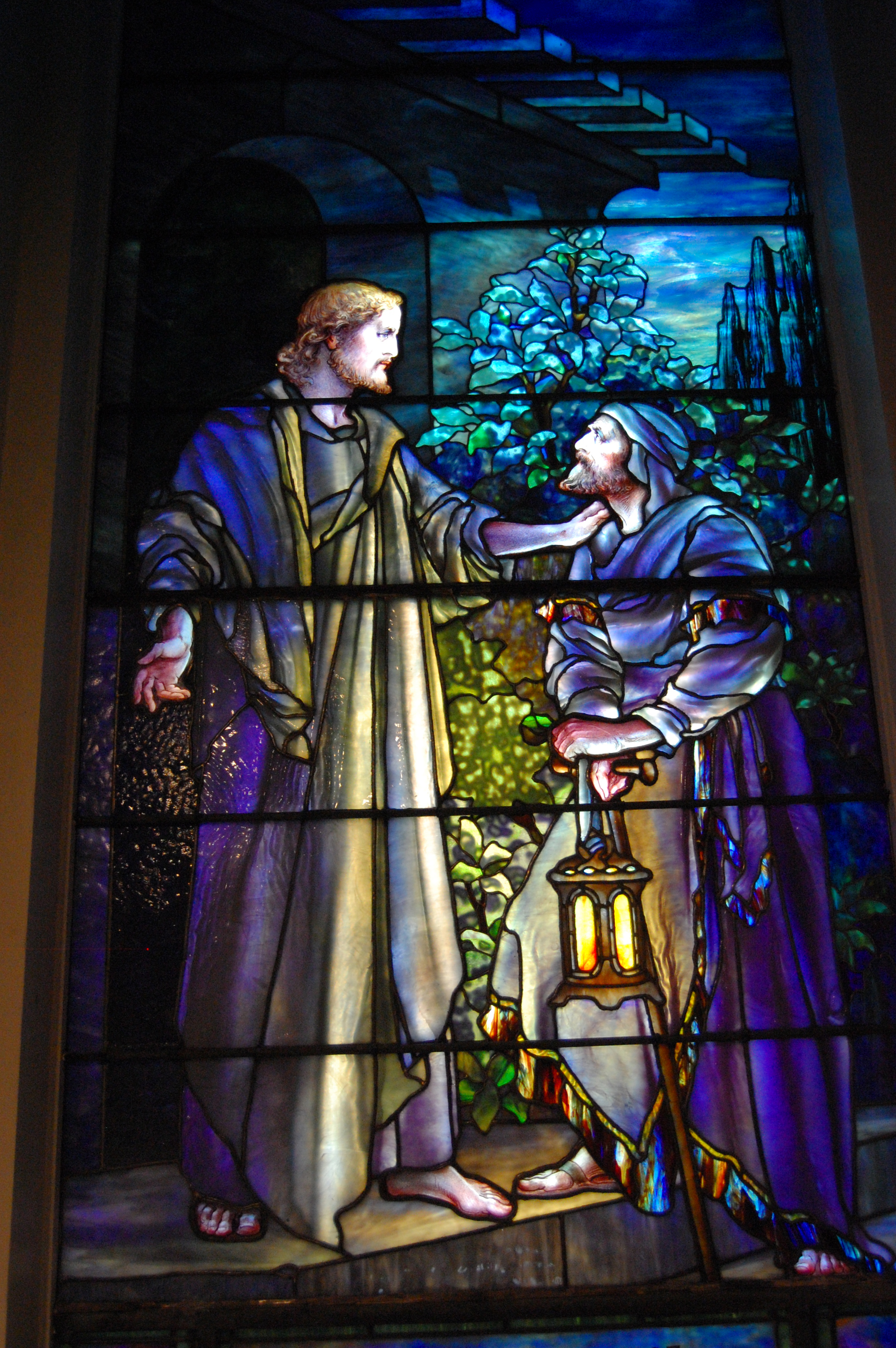
Nicodemus Came to Him by Night, First Presbyterian Church, Lockport, New York

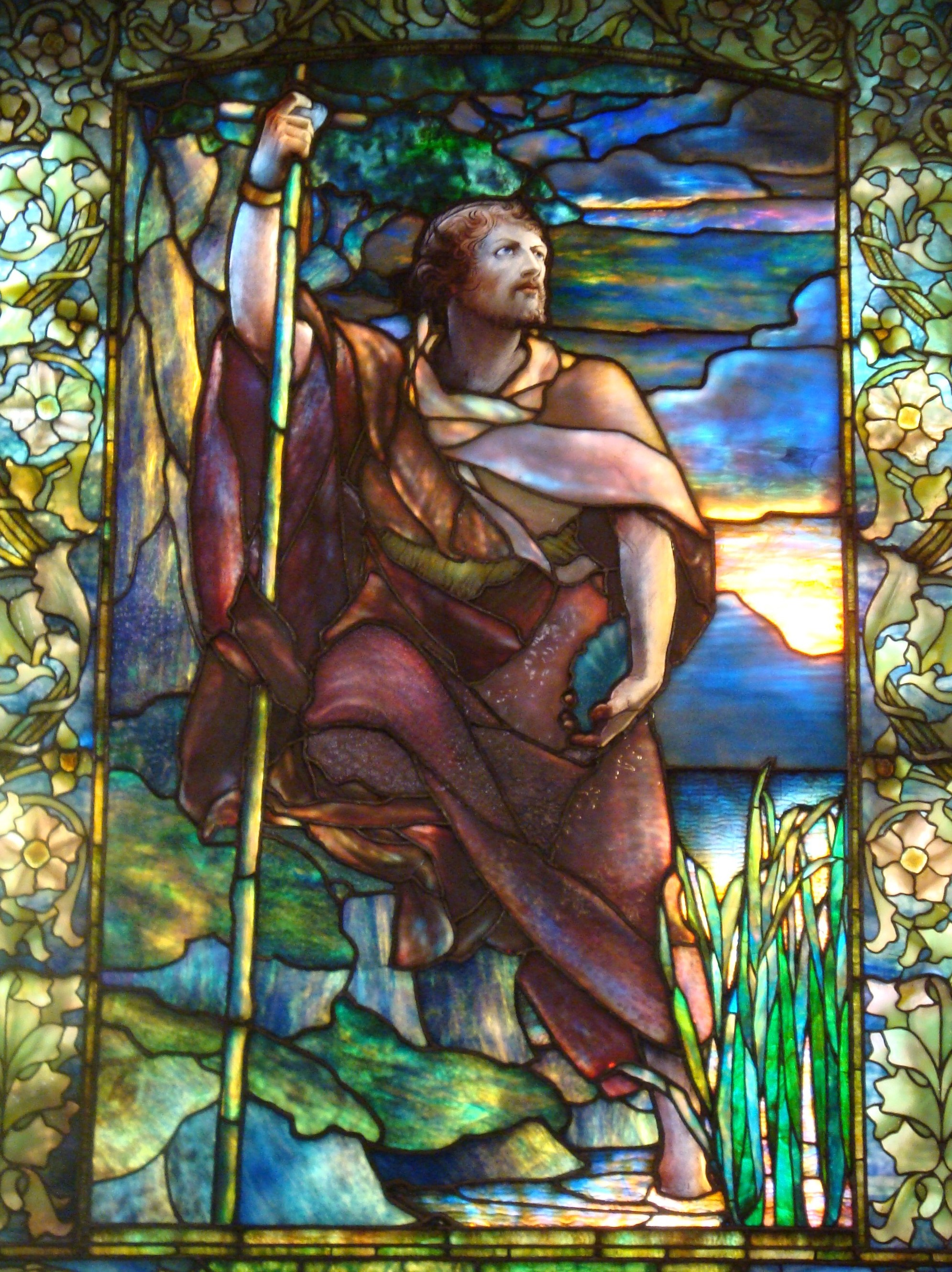
John the Baptist at Arlington Street Church in Boston

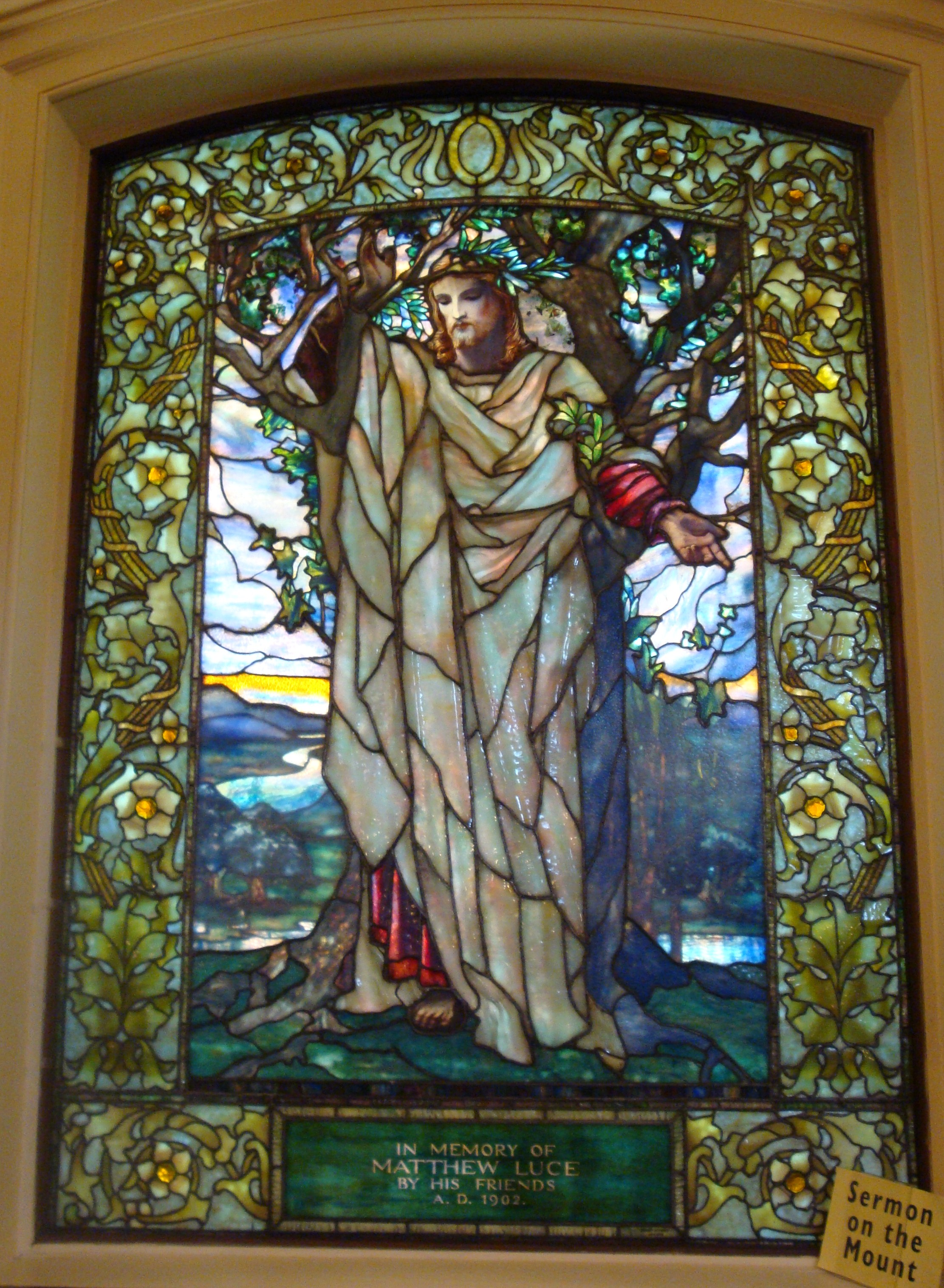
Sermon on the Mount at Arlington Street Church in Boston

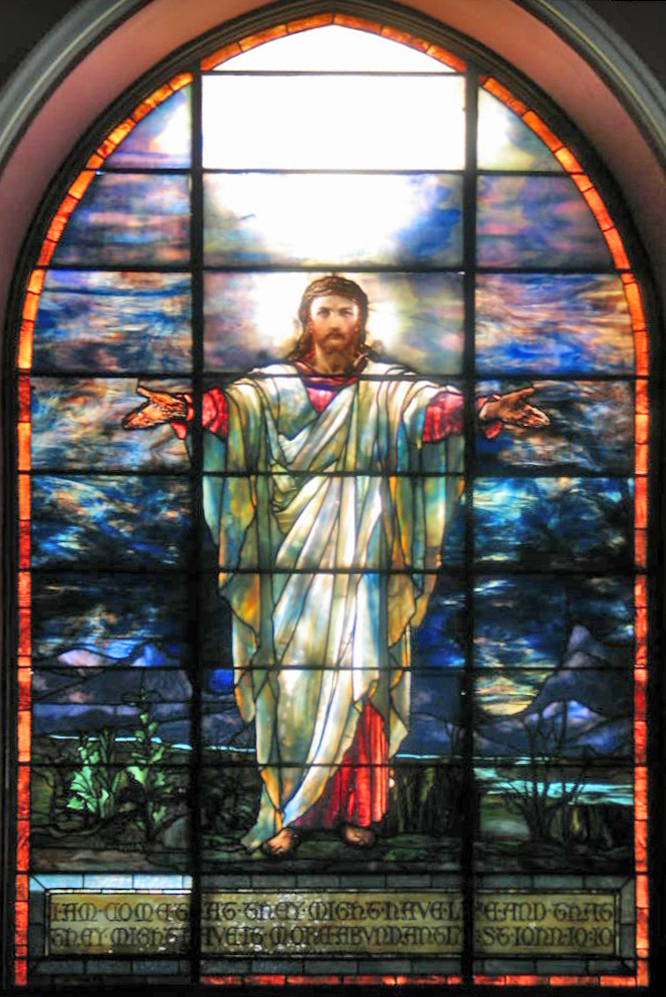
Christ the Consoler at Pullman Memorial Universalist Church, Albion, New York

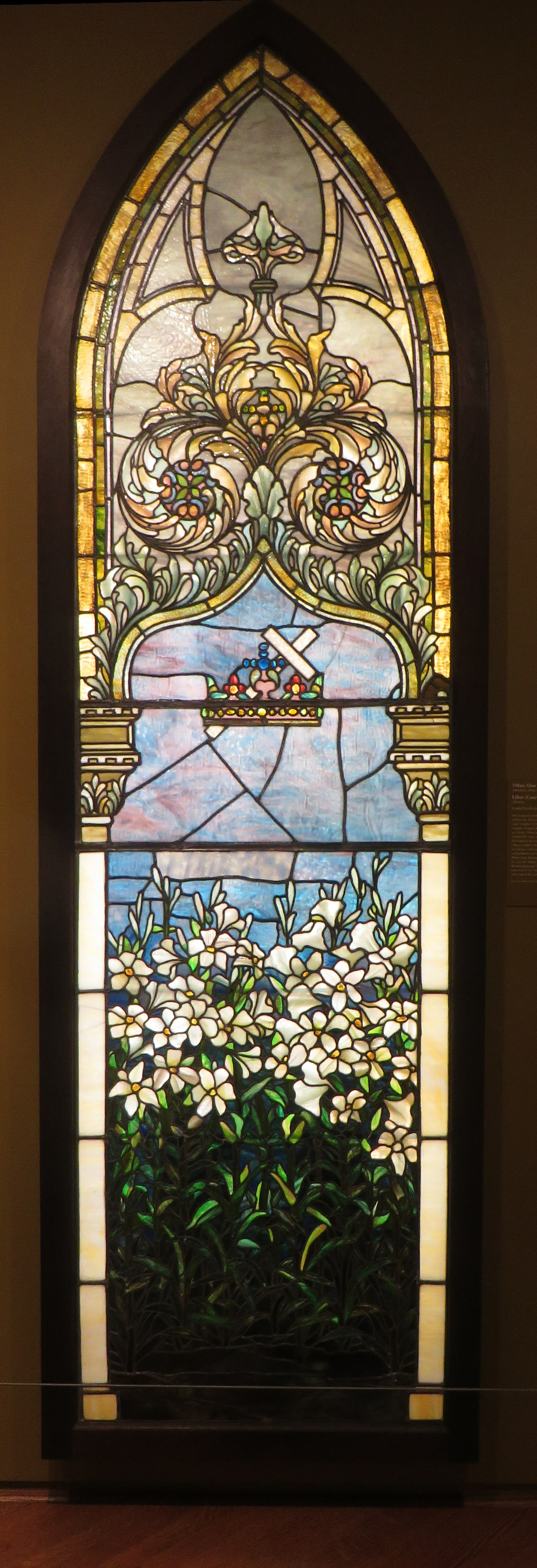
Corey Memorial Window (c. 1892–95), formerly at Christ Reformed Episcopal Church and now in the Art Institute of Chicago in Chicago

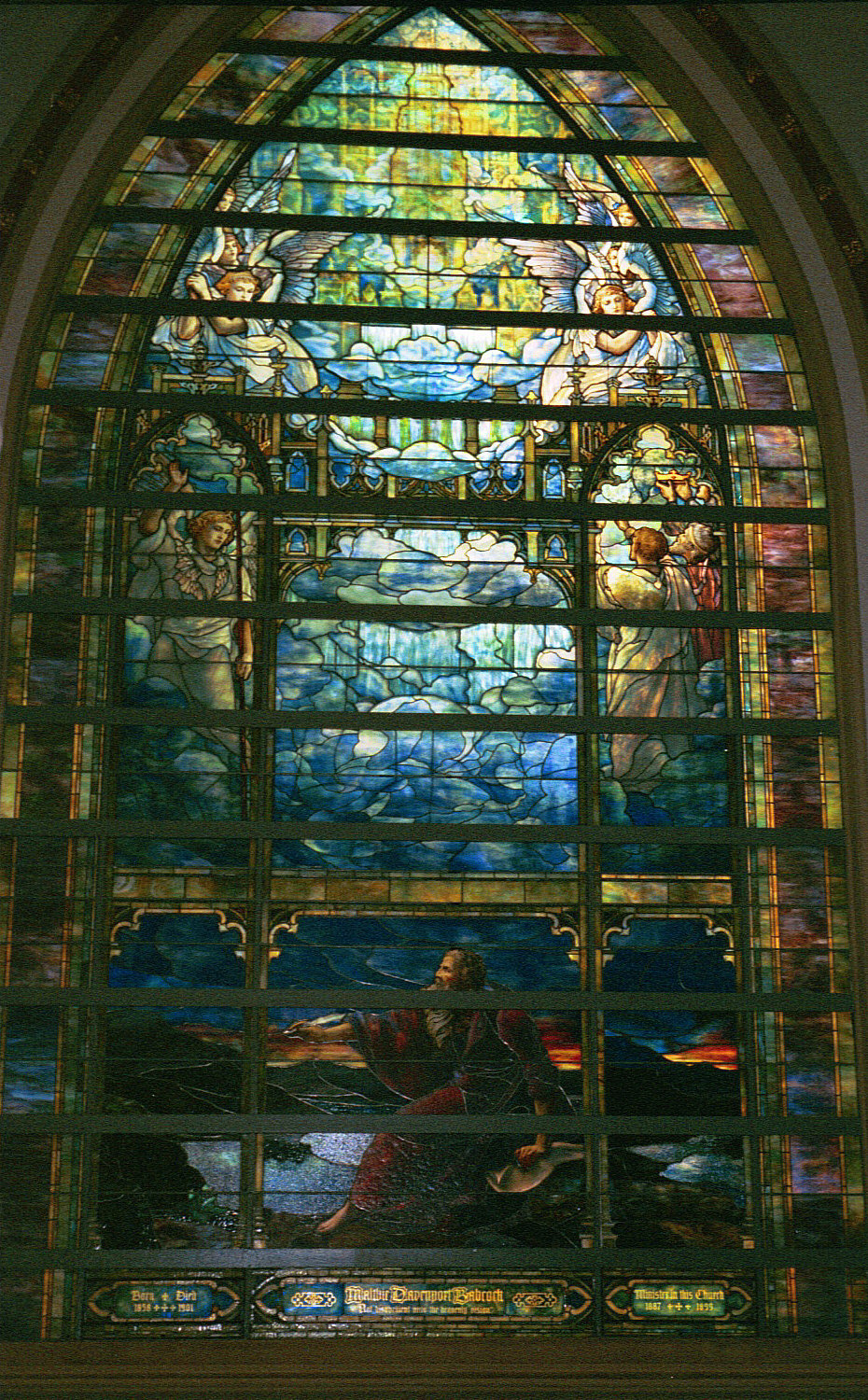
The Holy City (1905), representing St. John's vision on the isle of Patmos, one of eleven Tiffany windows at Brown Memorial Presbyterian Church in Baltimore; with 58 panels, it is believed to be one of the largest Tiffany Studios windows
Education

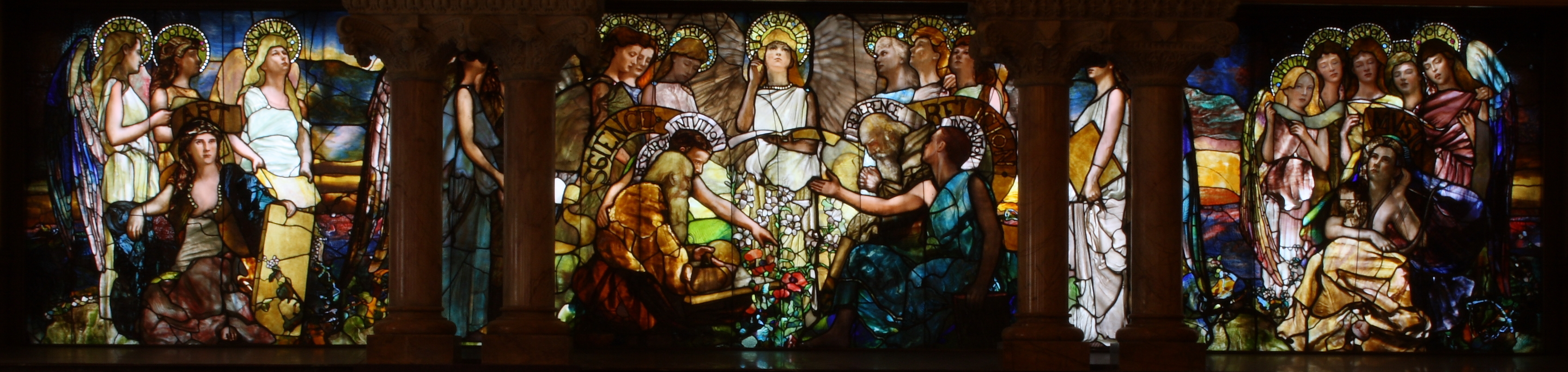
Education, the Chittenden Memorial Window at Yale University
Tiffany Lamps

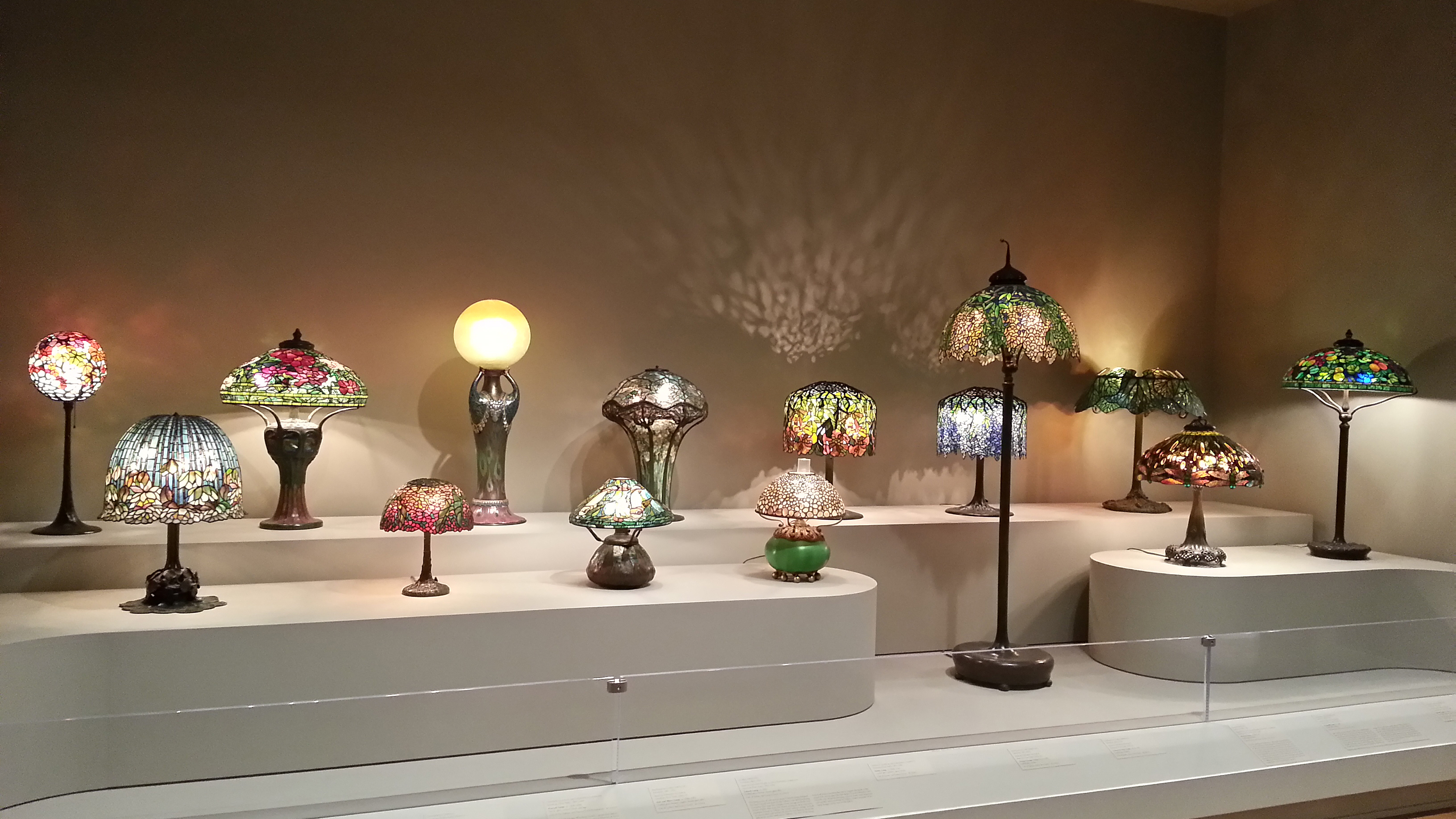
Collection of Tiffany lamps from the Virginia Museum of Fine Arts

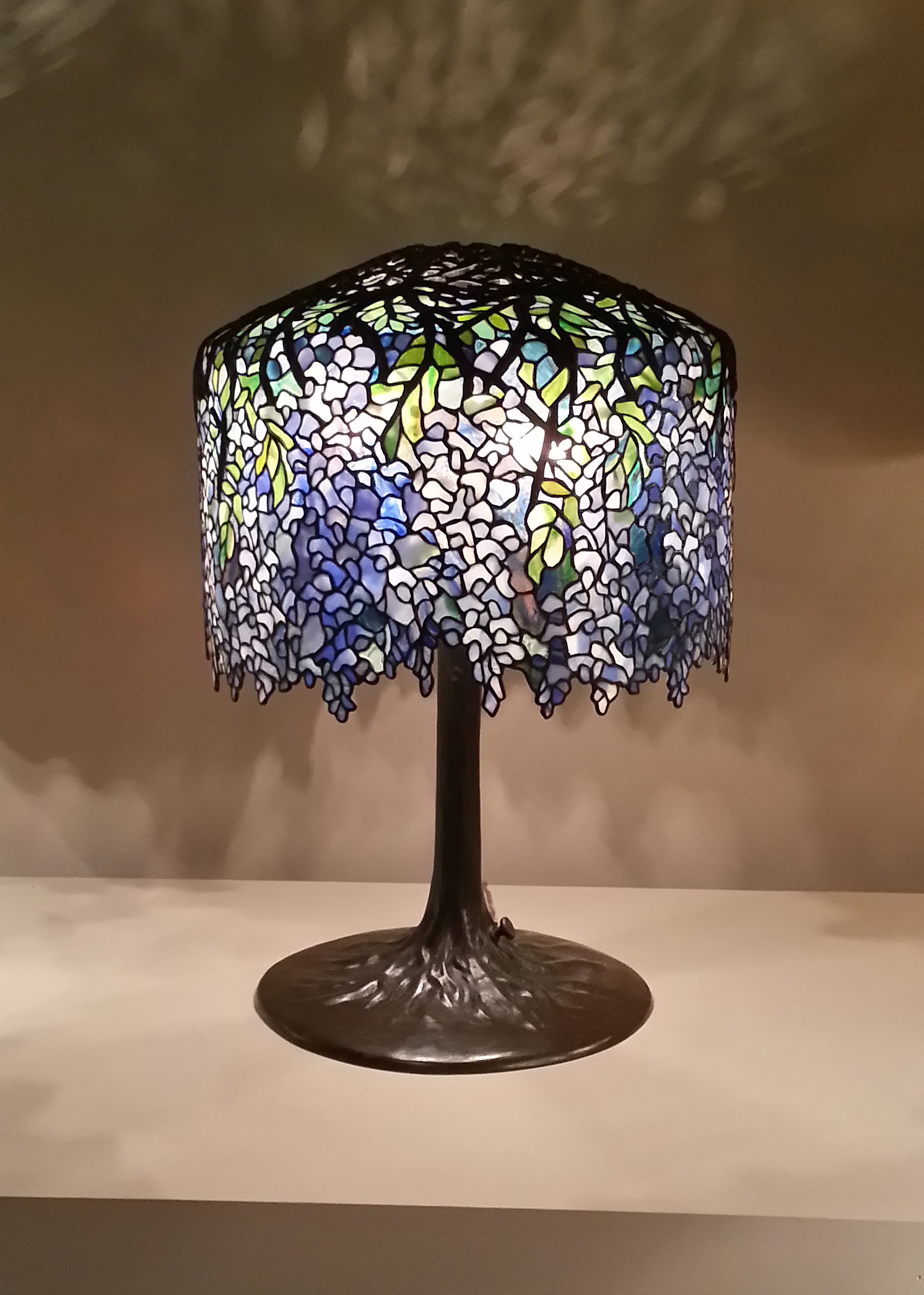
Wisteria table lamp

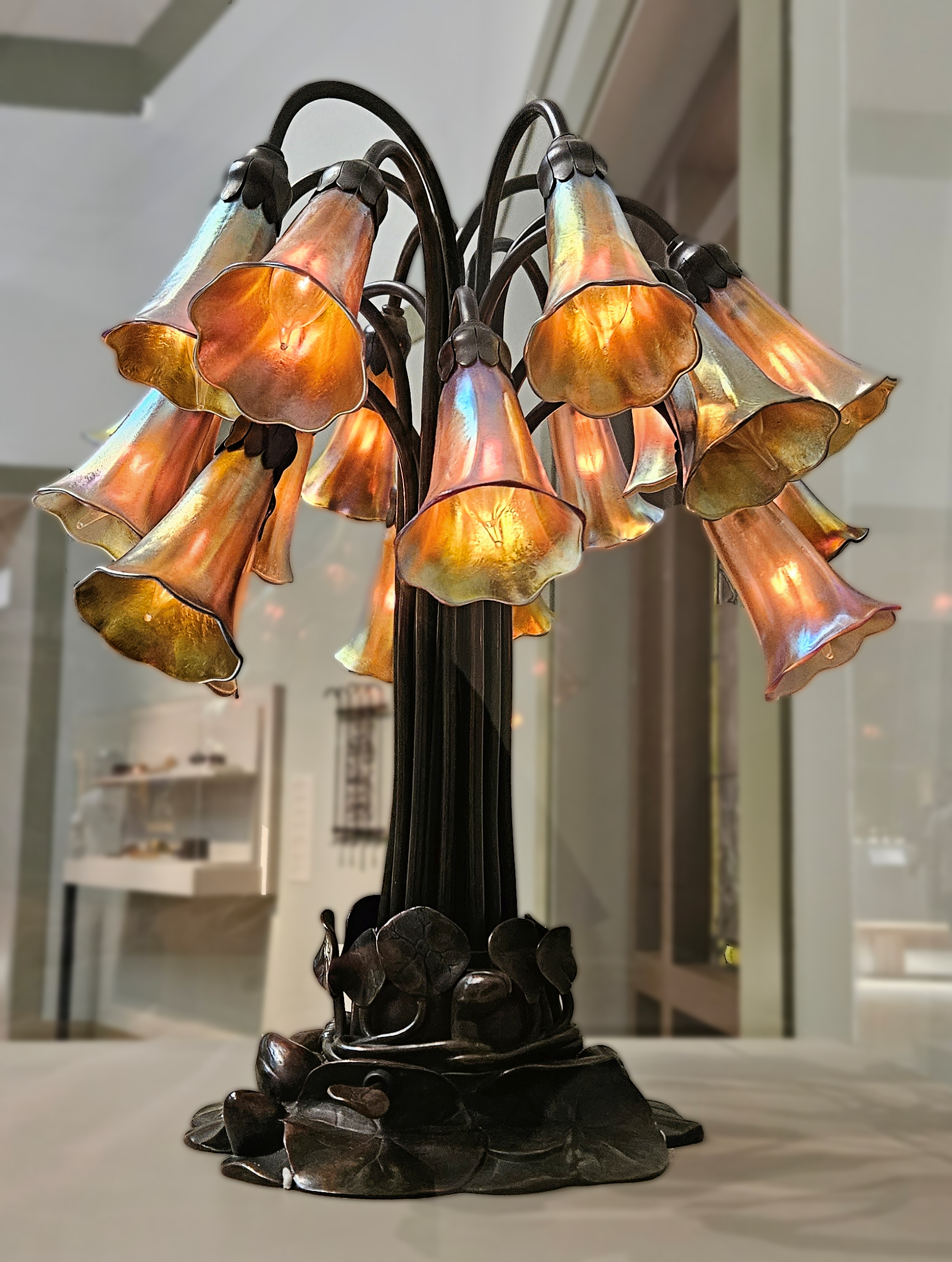
Eighteen Lily floriform lamp by the Tiffany Studios (c. 1902) in the collection of The Huntington Library Art Museum in San Marino, CA.
Interior Designs

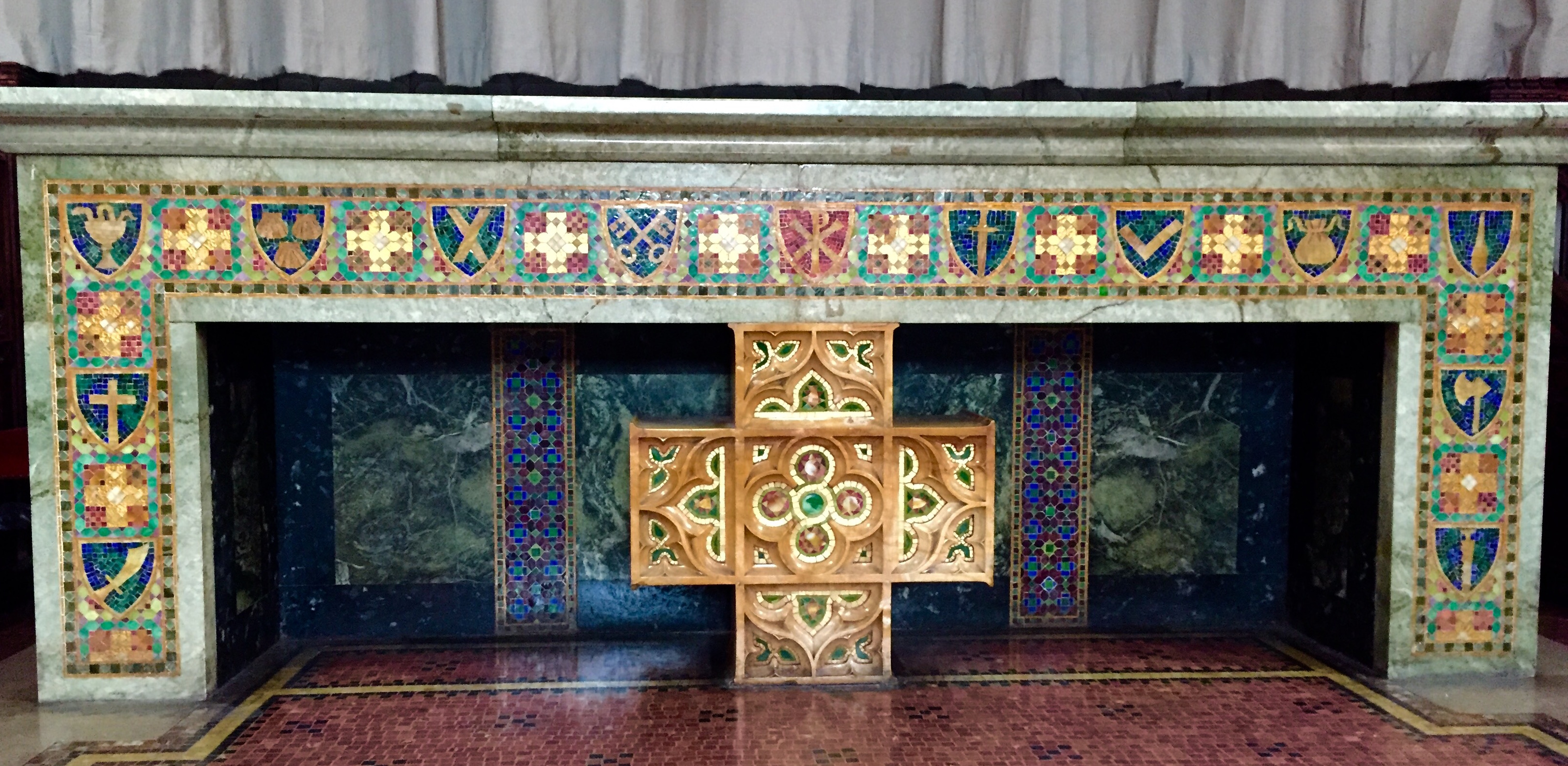
Altar designed by Tiffany at the Fourth Universalist Society in the City of New York

== See also ==
- Tiffany glass
- The Louis Comfort Tiffany Foundation
- Art Nouveau glass
- Arts and Crafts movement
