= Church of St. Barnabas (Irvington, New York) =

Historic Episcopal church in New York, United States

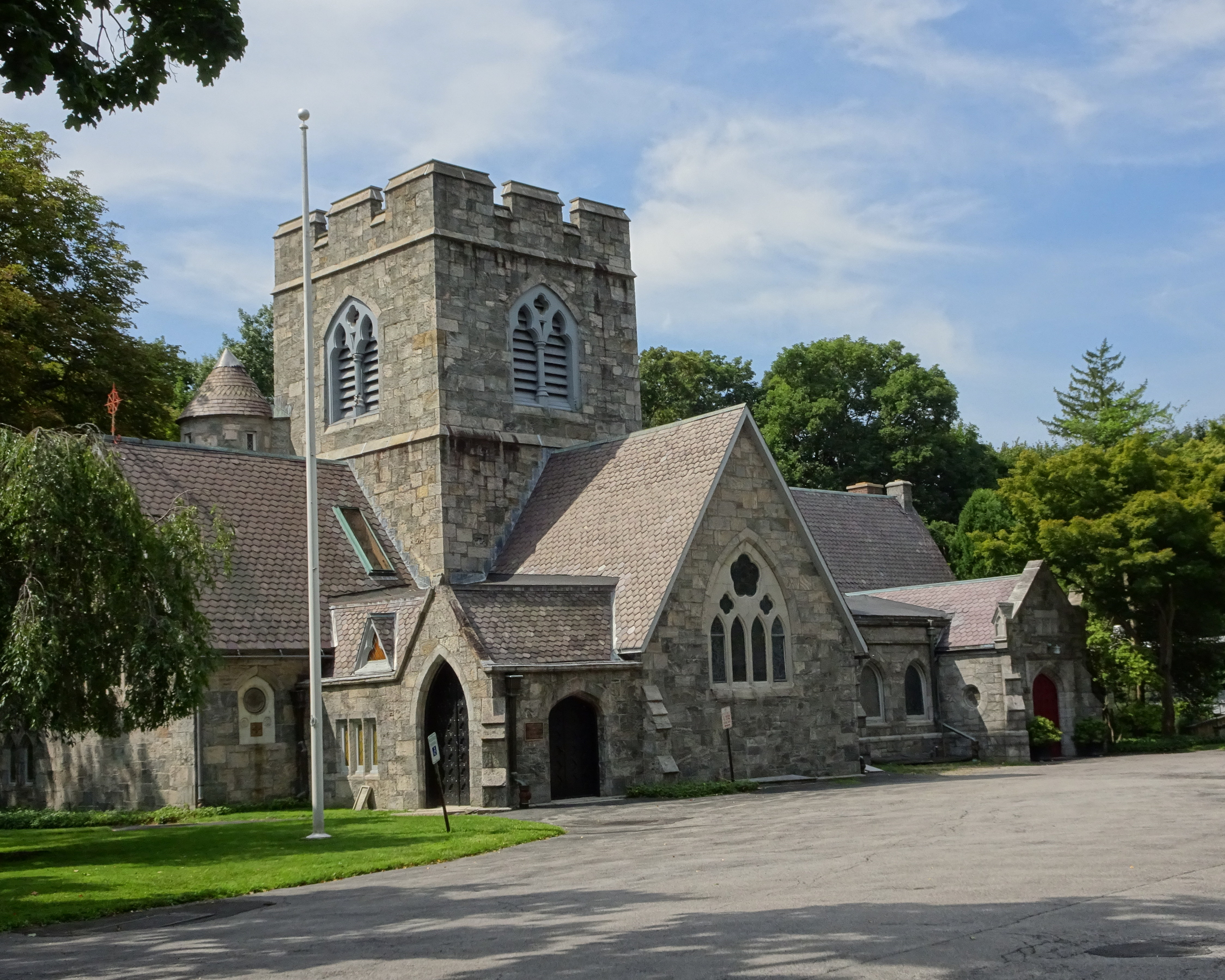
- North facade, 2016

Religion
- Affiliation: Episcopal Church
- Leadership: The Rev. Gareth Evans, Rector
- Year consecrated: 1853

Location
- Location: Irvington, NY, USA
- Interactive map of Church of St. Barnabas
- Coordinates: 41°2′23″N 73°51′55″W

Architecture
- Architect: Renwick & Sands
- Style: Gothic Revival, Collegiate Gothic
- Groundbreaking: 1852
- Completed: 1853

Specifications
- Direction of façade: West
- Height (max): 55 feet (17 m)
- Materials: Stone, slate, asphalt

U.S. National Register of Historic Places
- Added to NRHP: March 24, 2000
- NRHP Reference no.: 00000241

Website
- Church of Saint Barnabas

The Church of St. Barnabas is an Episcopal house of worship in Irvington, New York, United States. It is a stone Gothic Revival structure whose oldest sections date to the mid-19th century, with several expansions undertaken since then. The reputedly haunted church complex was added to the National Register of Historic Places in 2000.

The church reported 579 members in 2016 and 313 members in 2023; no membership statistics were reported in 2024 parochial reports. Plate and pledge income for the congregation in 2024 was $401,853 with average Sunday attendance (ASA) of 67.

At first the church was a small chapel modeled on St Martin's Church in Canterbury, the oldest church in continuous use in England. It was part of a school, but after six years that was abandoned and it became a parish church. An expansion into the present structure a decade later was designed by the firm of architect James Renwick Jr. Among its members have been Washington Irving, Philip Schuyler and Jay Gould, all of whom lived in the area.

Since its construction it has been expanded several times. Most additions have been either sympathetic to the original architecture or unobtrusive. Its congregation plays a major role in the Irvington community, sponsoring several local programs including the village's only day care center.

== Buildings and grounds ==
The church occupies a 2.74-acre (1.11 ha) lot on the west side of North Broadway (U.S. Route 9) just north of the intersection with Irvington's Main Street. To its north is a 19th-century Presbyterian church. On the south are properties along the north side of Main Street, a mix of commercial and residential buildings, including the McVickar House, also listed on the Register and currently home to the Irvington Historical Society. Across the street is a modern residential development; on the west the church property is bounded by the trailway along the route of the Old Croton Aqueduct, a linear National Historic Landmark.

A driveway leads into the property from North Broadway, opening into a large annular parking area just northeast of the main church building, where it meets a walkway from a lych gate along Broadway. The parish house extends from its north side, to the west of the parking area. A modern garage is attached to its west. South of the church is the rectory. All buildings on the property except the garage, and the lychgate, are considered contributing resources to the church's historic character.

To the west of the garage is a small playground, amidst a broader lawn. Tall mature trees shade the buildings and line the edges of the property. The terrain slopes gently west, towards the Hudson River.

=== Church ===
The main church building incorporates the original chapel built on the site. It is an asymmetrical one-story building on a partial basement with granite walls topped by a gabled slate roof. The lancet arched windows have limestone molding and tracery, while the tower and buttresses are trimmed with bluestone coping.

At the center is a 55-foot-tall (17 m) square crenelated tower with a louvered vent on all four sides between two bluestone courses and flat roof. On its southeast corner is a smaller, round tower with a conical roof. The church's two entrances are located on a side aisle on the north; there is a small chapel at the west end.

Inside the sanctuary, the floor is mosaic. Plaster walls and ceilings are complemented by dark wood tongue and groove wainscoting and exposed trusses. It is illuminated by 15 stained glass windows.

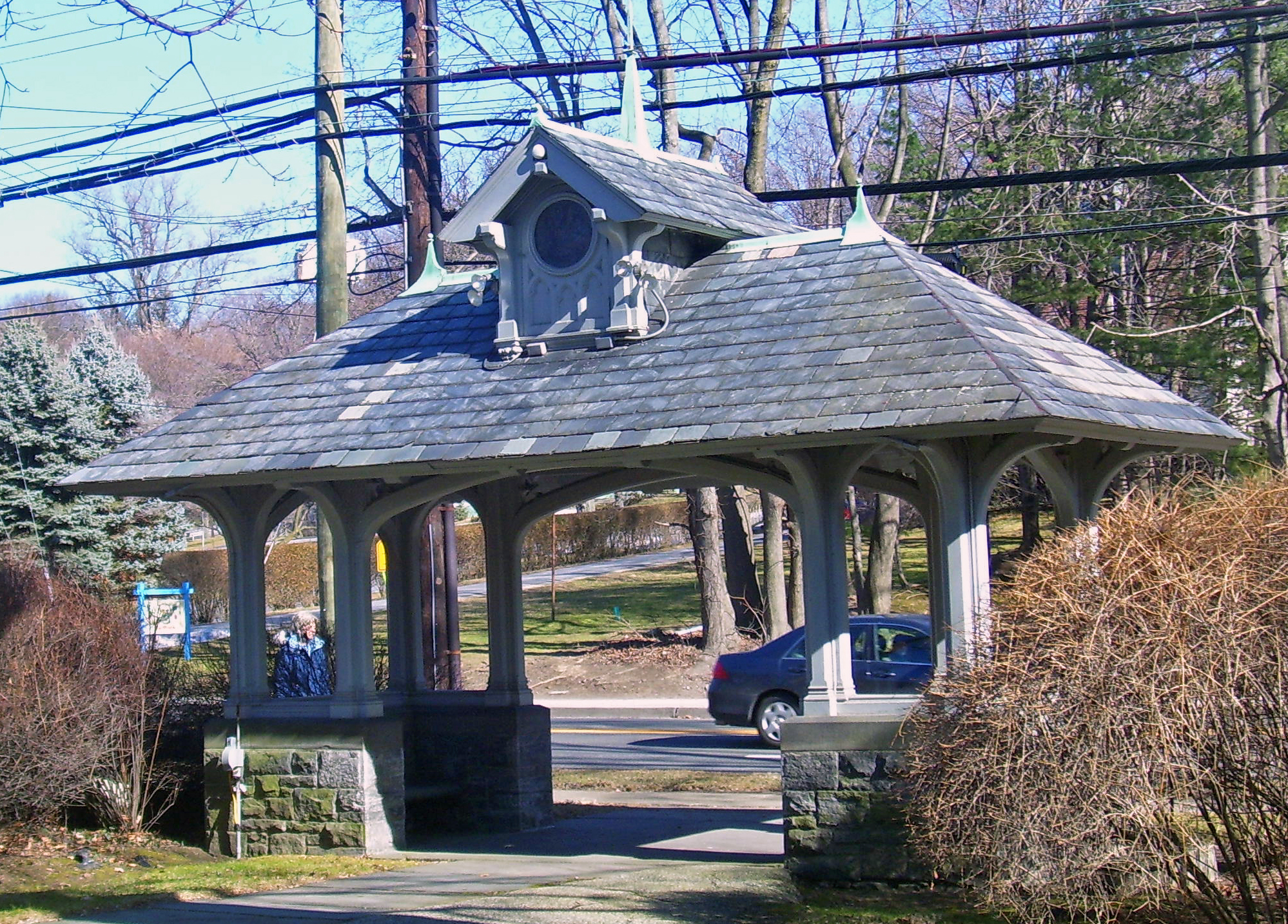
Lych gate

Like the church, the parish hall wing is a one-and-a-half granite structure with Gothic detail and a gabled roof. However, it is sheathed in asphalt shingles rather than slate. Inside it has a large meeting room with original woodwork.

The modern office wing that connects the parish hall to the church has vertical wood siding, large casement windows and a flat roof. The modern classroom extension to the west of the parish hall has a similar treatment. Both of these elements are sited so as to be unobtrusive from the street.

=== Rectory and lych gate ===
South of the church, the rectory is a granite structure with a slate roof. Later additions include a front piazza and a rear wing sided in clapboard and roofed in asphalt. Its interior retains some of its original woodwork and layout, although it has been remodeled several times. A modern garage, the only non-contributing resource on the property, is adjacent.

The smallest historic resource on the property is the lych gate. Framing the view of the church from Broadway, it is also a granite and limestone structure with a slate roof and wooden Gothic detail. Atop is a gabled clock and copper finials.

== History ==
St. Barnabas began as a school. The Rev. John McVickar, a friend of early American author Washington Irving, bought the 30 acres (12 ha) where the church is presently located in order to be closer to Irving's estate, Sunnyside, a National Historic Landmark (NHL). The two frequently spent evenings on Irving's veranda watching the sun set across the Hudson, and during their conversations came up with the idea to establish a school and chapel on the property. Irving contributed some of the money while the rest came from descendants of the state's Revolutionary-era notables such as John Jay, Alexander Hamilton, and Trinity Church in Manhattan.

McVickar took responsibility for the design. He had studied church architecture since the early years of the 19th century, which had led him to believe that the key aspect of a beautiful church was its proportions rather than its materials. He is said to have based the building on St Martin's Church in Canterbury, a 6th-century structure that is the oldest church in continuous use in England and today a UNESCO World Heritage Site. It is likely that he designed the rectory as well, since a drawing of it from the time shows its basic rectangular form and Gothic detail. It was dedicated on June 2, 1853, St. Barnabas Day.

In 1858 it was decided to abandon the school and establish the chapel as a parish within the Episcopal Church, the first in the village, whose residents of that denomination had previously worshipped at Christ Episcopal Church in Tarrytown to the north. McVickar's son William, who had been a missionary to the village and rector of Zion Church in Dobbs Ferry, was appointed the first pastor. His father built a house for him near the church on what is today Irvington's Main Street. The original chapel sufficed for the congregation initially.

But by 1863 it had gotten too small. Renwick & Sands, the firm of James Renwick Jr., who had already designed New York City's Grace Church and St. Patrick's Cathedral, as well as the Smithsonian Institution in Washington and the Main Building at Vassar College in Poughkeepsie further up the Hudson Valley, all today NHLs, received the commission. At the time the firm was busy completing St. Patrick's. Two of its other commissions of the time, Riverdale Presbyterian Church and the William E. Dodge House, both located in the Bronx and also listed on the Register, share similar stonework, steep roofs and arched windows, but little else, with St. Barnabas.

The expansion added the tower, transept and chancel to the original building, which today survives as the nave. In the basement some of its framing, including whole logs, is still visible. The expansion of the property under the church's control continued when the McVickar family donated the rectory and its land to the church in 1876. Its piazza was reportedly added in 1889. Jay Gould, whose Lyndhurst estate, another NHL, is located north of Sunnyside, donated the remaining land the following year.

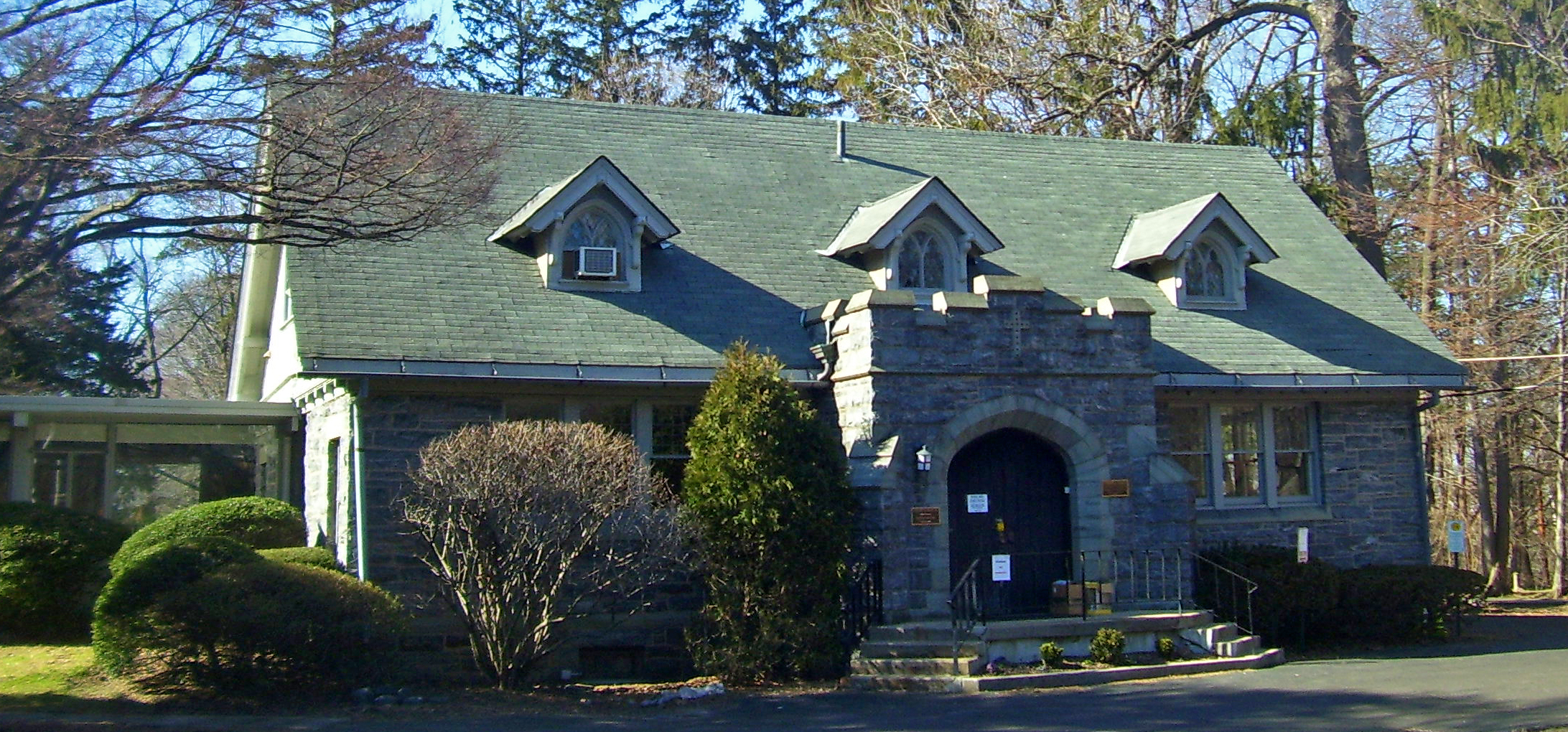
Parish hall

Over time the stained glass windows were added from different makers, including the first of two Tiffany windows, in 1896. Three years later the lych gate was built, and the parish hall added in 1902. The latter was designed by local architect Albert J. Manning, who also built Irvington's nearby village hall, in the more current Collegiate Gothic style. All were meant to be architecturally consistent with the church.

Another, smaller expansion in 1906 added electric lighting. That year the church hosted a major event, the funeral of Irvington resident, Gen. Phillip Schuyler. The grandson of the Revolutionary War general of the same name, Schuyler had attained the rank of brigadier general during the Civil War with the Army of the Potomac. While on a hunting trip late in 1906, he was killed in the same train accident that took the life of Samuel Spencer, president of the Southern Railway.

He had lived in nearby Ardsley-on-Hudson after retiring from a long business career, and worshipped at St. Barnabas. Due to the Schuyler family's prominence within the state, the funeral drew many notable attendees. A special train from the city carried 200 friends, representing many of its esteemed organizations and institutions. J. P. Morgan came on his own train with private car and special locomotive. Joseph Choate and Ogden Mills were also in attendance. The crowd was larger than the church could hold.

Changes to the church continued. In 1924 the parish hall's basement was equipped with a bowling alley and rifle range, leading to heavy use by the local Boy Scouts and Irvington's police department. The next addition was the Luke Memorial Chapel on the north side of the church, designed by Delano & Aldrich and built in 1945. The office and Sunday school wings, the latter connecting the parish hall to the church, completed the current complex in the 1960s.

== Reputed ghosts ==
There have been claims that the ghosts of some previous occupants haunt the building. One occupant matched a photo of one former member of a 19th-century pastor's family to a woman she frequently saw sitting in a rocking chair, knitting. In 2000, several workers installing a new organ left the church in rush after seeing an apparition in the sanctuary. It was believed by some members of the church to be the ghost of William McVickar.

== Beliefs and programs ==
St. Barnabas is part of the Episcopal Diocese of New York. It describes itself as "a Christian community that seeks to serve Christ in all persons, loving our neighbors as ourselves". Baptism is the only requirement for full membership. The current rector, The Rev. Gareth C. Evans, is the 14th to hold the position. Ordained in the Church of England in 1996, he became canonically resident in the Episcopal Church in 2004 and a U.S. citizen in 2016.

The church holds two services every Sunday. The 8AM service is Rite I Holy Eucharist according to the Book Common Prayer. The later service at 10AM is Rite II Holy Eucharist with choir and pipe organ. The summer schedule begins the Sunday after the Patronal Festival of St. Barnabas with one Rite II service of Holy Eucharist at 9AM.

Among its programs are children and youth ministries; The youth group meets monthly; its members go on field trips and play roles in the church's Christmas pageant and on St. Barnabas Day.

The church sponsors, and takes part in, a wide range of community outreach activities. It runs an annual clothing and thrift sale to benefit various local non-profit organizations. The Irvington Children's Center, the village's only day care center, is resident in the Sunday school wing and independently operated. Local chapters of Alcoholics Anonymous, Al-anon and Families Anonymous meet in the church. Member collect non-perishable food and disposable diapers for two local food pantries.

== See also ==
- List of reportedly haunted locations in the United States
- National Register of Historic Places listings in southern Westchester County, New York
