= Tiffany glass =

Glass developed by Tiffany Studios in New York City

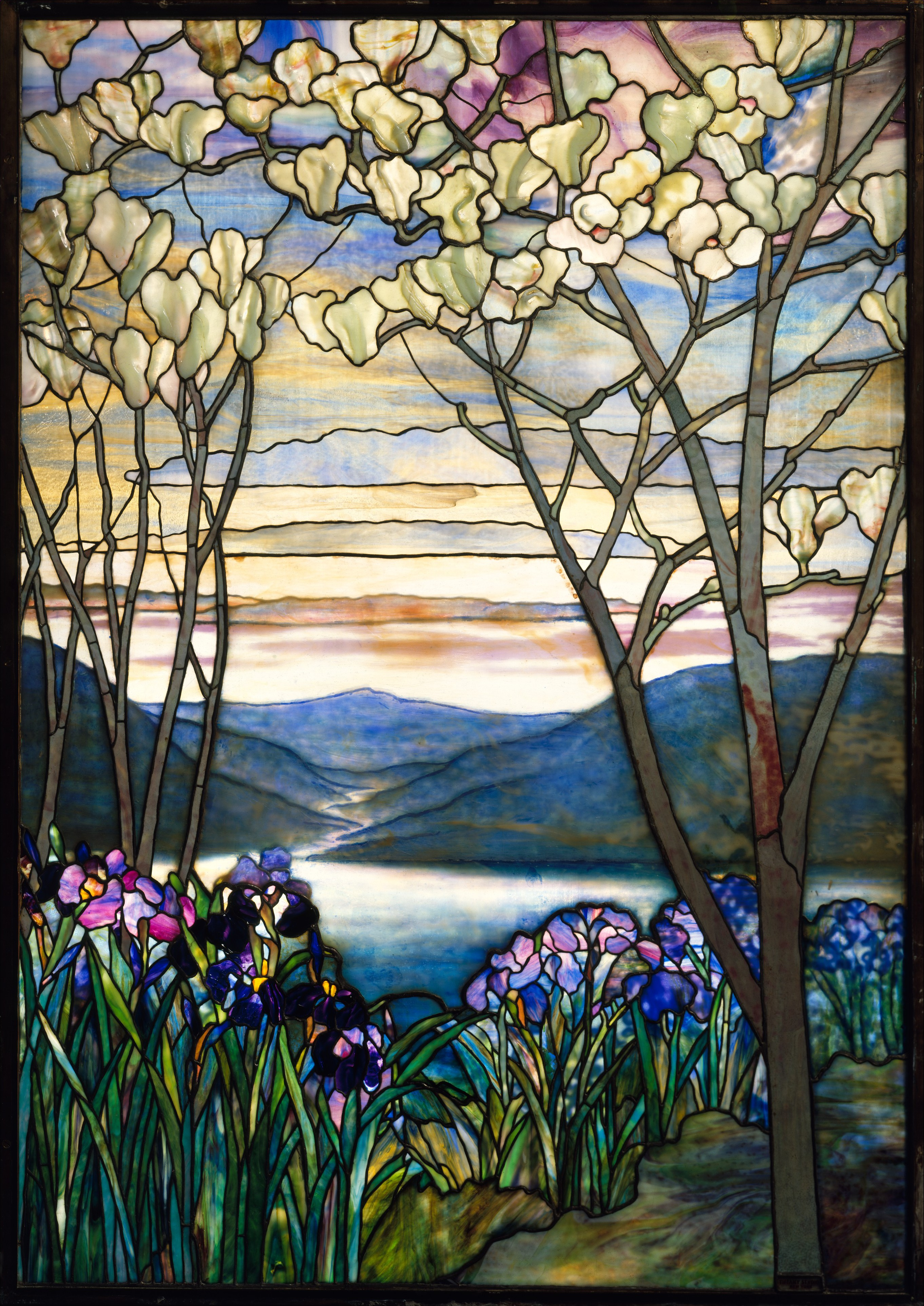
"Magnolias and Irises" stained glass window with Favrile glass, c. 1908

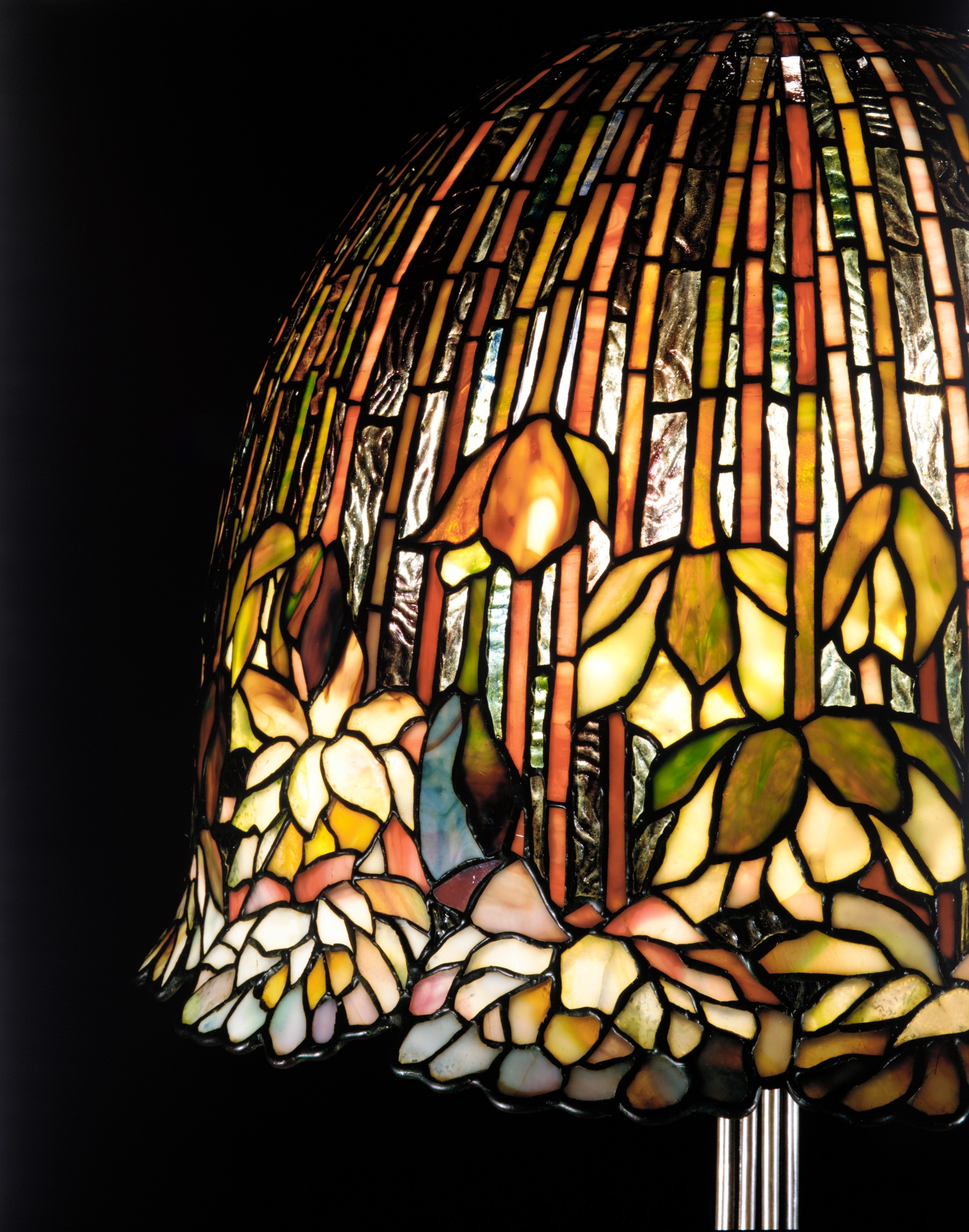
Tiffany lamp with water lilies, c. 1904–15

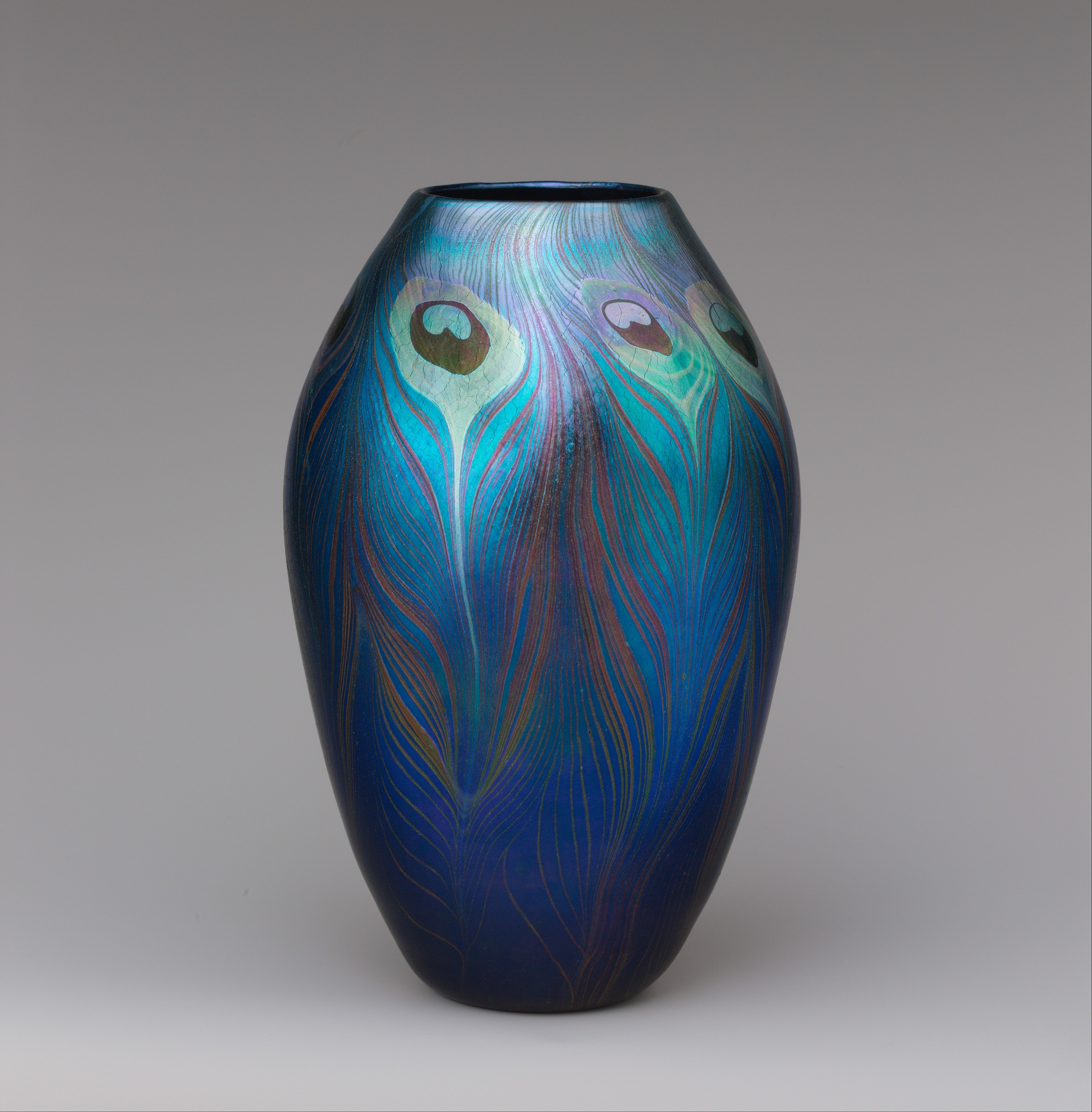
Favrile glass vase, c. 1900

Tiffany glass refers to the many types of art glass developed and produced from 1878 to 1932 at the Tiffany Studios in New York City, by Louis Comfort Tiffany and a team of other designers, including Clara Driscoll, Agnes F. Northrop, Frederick Wilson, and Alice Carmen Gouvy. They made stained glass windows, Tiffany lamps with glass shades, glass mosaics, vases and other blown glass items, and other decorative art for homes, churches, and businesses such as hotels. This was part of a larger movement of Art Nouveau glass.

In 1865, Tiffany traveled to Europe, and in London he visited the Victoria and Albert Museum, whose extensive collection of Roman glass and Syrian glass made a deep impression on him. He admired the coloration of medieval glass and was convinced that the quality of contemporary glass could be improved upon because the production of art glass in America during this time was not close to what Europeans were creating. In his own words, the "Rich tones are due in part to the use of pot metal full of impurities, and in part to the uneven thickness of the glass, but still more because the glass maker of that day abstained from the use of paint".

Tiffany was an interior designer, and in 1878 his interest turned toward the creation of stained glass. He opened his own studio and glass foundry because he was unable to find the types of glass that he desired in interior decoration. His inventiveness both as a designer of windows and as a producer of the material with which to create them was to become renowned. Tiffany wanted the glass itself to transmit texture and rich colors, and he developed a type of glass he called "Favrile".

== Tiffany Studios ==
Tiffany was intrigued by glass production in medieval Europe, and was disappointed by the type of glass produced in the 19th century in The United States. According to Rachel Bradshaw, "Tiffany came to realize that the nineteenth century windows lacked the brilliance and quality of this medieval glass. Instead, nineteenth century artisans placed more emphasis on naturalistic detail rather than on color, using enamels to create the effects of drapery, hair, facial features, and foliage." Although the United States did not have many experts in the field of glass at the time, Tiffany started doing experiments with glass and color. He was able to modernize some of the glassworks he has seen in textbooks about medieval glass, and those he had seen in Europe.

From there Tiffany started conducting more experiments and established a new era for what is known to be glasswork. An article by the Metropolitan Museum of Art said, "Of all of Tiffany's artistic endeavors, leaded-glass brought him the greatest recognition. Tiffany and his early rival, John La Farge, revolutionized the look of stained glass, which had remained essentially unchanged since medieval times when craftsmen utilized flat panes of white and colored glass with details painted with glass paints before firing and leading."

Tiffany's favrile glass was manufactured at the Tiffany factory located at 96–18 43rd Avenue in Corona, Queens from 1901 to 1932. The Louis Tiffany School, New York City P.S. (public school) 110Q, was built on the old site.

=== Closing ===
The closing of the factory has been a matter of some controversy. Tiffany's glass fell out of favor in the 1910s, and by the 1920s a foundry had been installed for a separate bronze company. Tiffany's leadership and talent, as well as his father's money and old firm allowed Tiffany to relaunch Tiffany Studios as a marketing strategy in order for his business to thrive. In 1932, Tiffany Studios filed for bankruptcy. Ownership of the complex passed back to the original owners of the factory — the Roman Bronze Works — which had served as a subcontractor to Tiffany for many years." John Polachek, founder of the General Bronze Corporation —who had worked at the Tiffany Studios earlier— purchased the Roman Bronze Works (the old Tiffany Studios). General Bronze then became the largest bronze fabricator in New York City formed through the merger of his own companies and Tiffany's Corona factory. Louis Tiffany subsequently died in 1933.

== Types ==
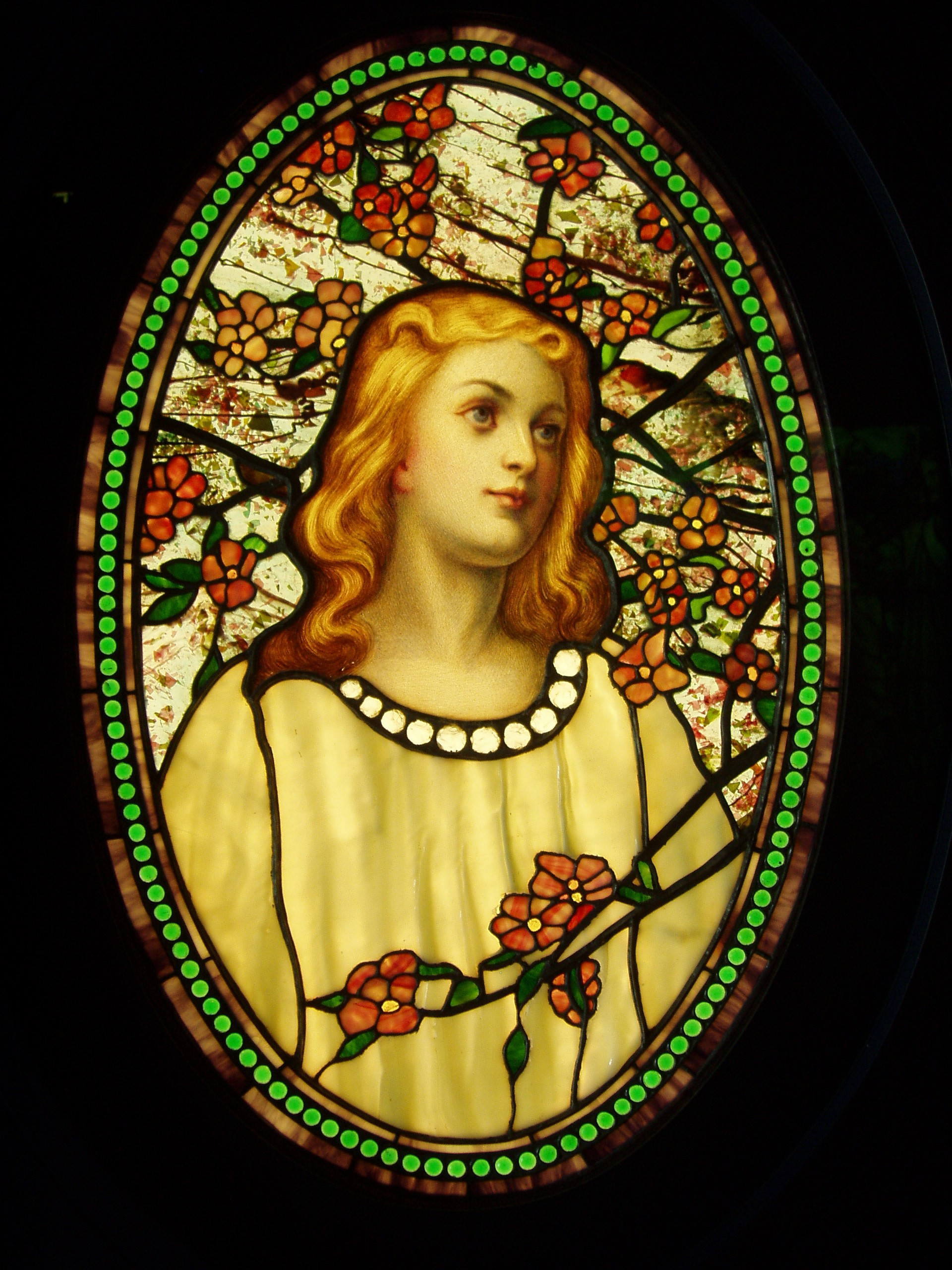
Girl with Cherry Blossoms incorporates polychrome painting of the face, drapery glass for the dress, opalescent glass for the blossoms, streaky glass in the border, and fracture-streamer glass in the background

=== Opalescent glass ===
The term "opalescent glass" is commonly used to describe glass where more than one color is present, being fused during the manufacture, as against flashed glass in which two colors may be laminated, or silver stained glass where a solution of silver nitrate is superficially applied, turning red glass to orange and blue glass to green. Some opalescent glass was used by several stained glass studios in England from the 1860s and 1870s onwards, notably Heaton, Butler and Bayne. Its use became increasingly common. Opalescent glass is the basis for the range of glasses created by Tiffany. (Note: The use of the term opalescent is actually a misnomer. Opalescence actually refers to the quality of changing color under transmitted light, rather than the quality of having several colors present. A rare example of true opalescent glass is the Roman Lycurgus cup in the British Museum.)

Opalescent glass comes in three main types. The first type is exemplified by blue-tinged semi-opaque or clear glass with milky opalescence in the center, seen in creations by Lalique, Sabino, and Jobling's. This effect is achieved through slower cooling, causing crystallization. The glass glows golden when backlit and a beautiful blue when front-lit. Many French companies in the 1920s and 1930s, such as Lalique and Sabino, produced opalescent art deco pieces. The second type features a milky white edge or raised pattern on colored pressed glass. Reheating sections during the cooling process turns them white, creating a decorative effect. This method was employed by various companies, including Barolac in Bohemia, Jobling's in England, and Val St Lambert in Belgium. The third type involves hand-blown glass with two layers, containing heat-reactive components like bone ash. The glass is blown into a mold with a raised pattern, and reheating turns the heat-sensitive glass milky white, creating a contrasting silhouette against the clear background.

=== Favrile glass ===
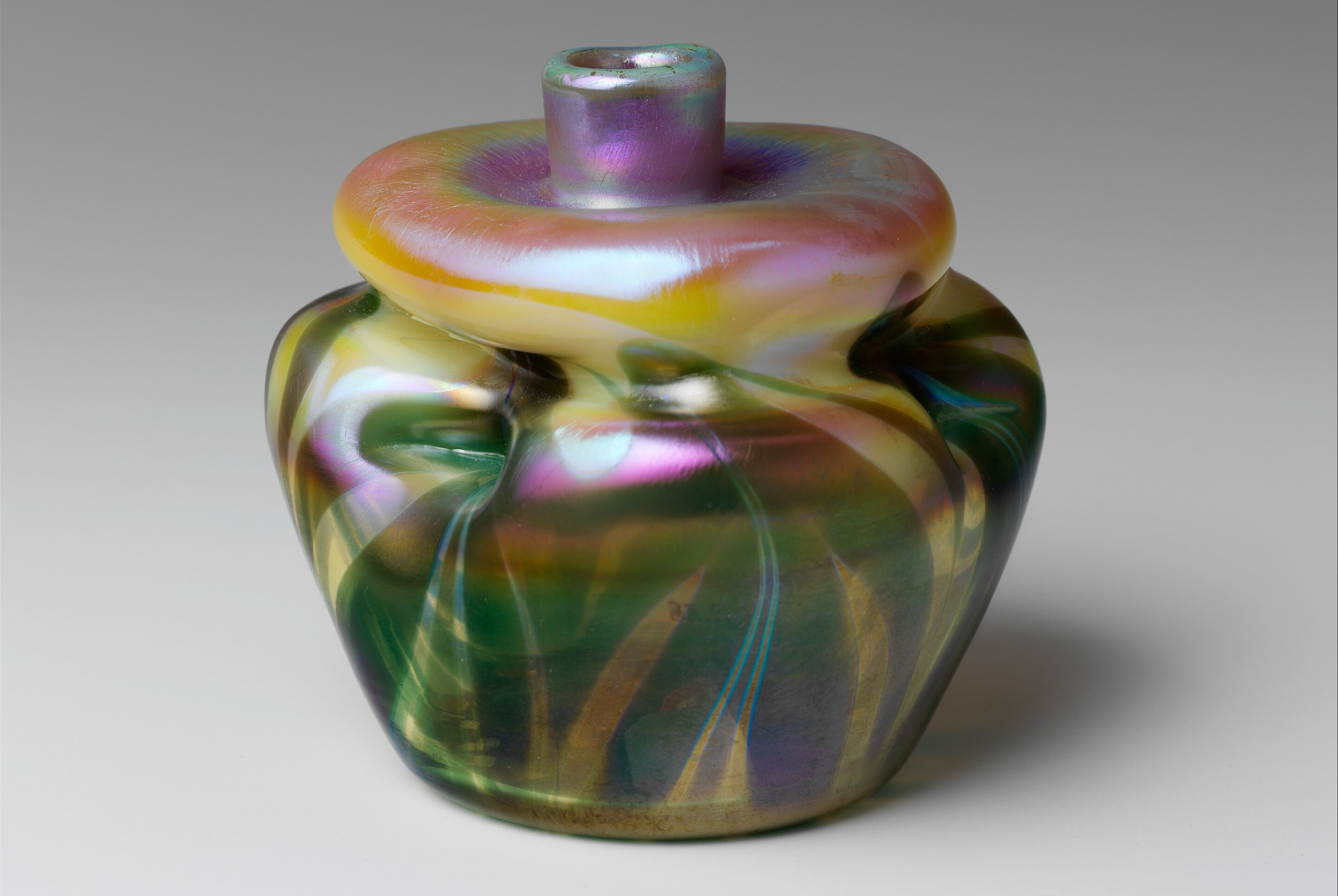
Favrile glass vase c. 1893–96

Tiffany patented Favrile glass in 1892. Favrile glass often has a distinctive characteristic that is common in some glass from classical antiquity: it possesses a superficial iridescence. Tiffany said "Favrile glass is distinguished by...brilliant or deeply toned colors, usually iridescent like the wings of certain American butterflies, the necks of pigeons and peacocks, the wing covers of various beetles." This iridescence causes the surface to shimmer, but also causes a degree of opacity. This iridescent effect of the glass was obtained by mixing different colors of glass together while hot.

=== Streamer glass ===
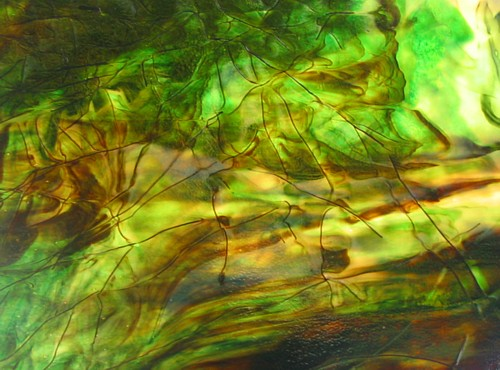
Streamer glass

Streamer glass refers to a sheet of glass with a pattern of glass strings affixed to its surface. Tiffany made use of such textured glass to represent, for example, twigs, branches and grass. Streamers are prepared from very hot molten glass, gathered at the end of a punty (pontil) that is rapidly swung back and forth and stretched into long, thin strings that rapidly cool and harden. These hand-stretched streamers are pressed on the molten surface of sheet glass during the rolling process, and become permanently fused.

=== Fracture glass ===
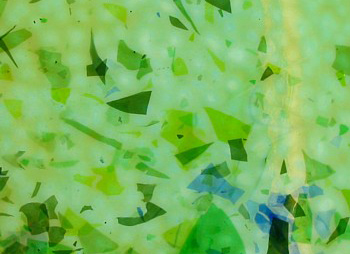
Fracture glass

Fracture glass refers to a sheet of glass with a pattern of irregularly shaped, thin glass wafers affixed to its surface. Tiffany made use of such textured glass to represent, for example, foliage seen from a distance. The irregular glass wafers, called fractures, are prepared from very hot, colored molten glass, gathered at the end of a blowpipe. A large bubble is forcefully blown until the walls of the bubble rapidly stretch, cool and harden. The resulting glass bubble has paper-thin walls and is immediately shattered into shards. These hand blown shards are pressed on the surface of the molten glass sheet during the rolling process, to which they become permanently fused.

=== Fracture-streamer glass ===
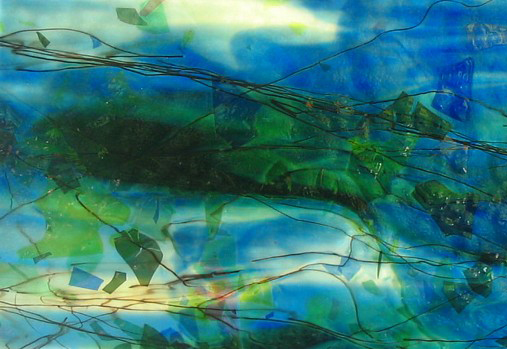
Fracture-streamer glass

Fracture-streamer glass refers to a sheet of glass with a pattern of glass strings, and irregularly shaped, thin glass wafers, affixed to its surface. Tiffany made use of such textured glass to represent, for example, twigs, branches and grass, and distant foliage. The process is as above except that both streamers and fractures are applied to sheet glass during the rolling process.

=== Ring mottle glass ===
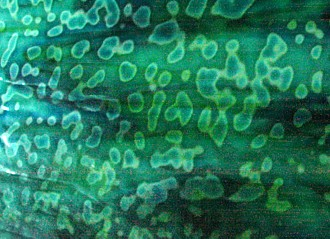
Ring mottle glass

Ring mottle glass refers to sheet glass with a pronounced mottle created by localized, heat-treated opacification and crystal-growth dynamics. Ring mottle glass was invented by Tiffany in the early 20th century. Tiffany's distinctive style exploited glass containing a variety of motifs such as those found in ring mottle glass, and he relied minimally on painted details.

When Tiffany Studios closed in 1932, the secret formula for making ring mottle glass was forgotten and lost. Ring mottle glass was re-discovered in the late sixties by Eric Lovell of Uroboros Glass. Traditionally used for organic details on leaves and other natural elements, ring mottles also find a place in contemporary work when abstract patterns are desired.

=== Ripple glass ===
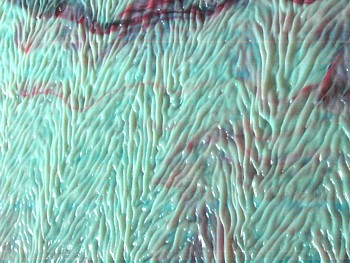
Herringbone ripple glass

Ripple glass refers to textured glass with marked surface waves. Tiffany made use of such textured glass to represent, for example, water or leaf veins. The texture is created during the glass sheet-forming process. A sheet is formed from molten glass with a roller that spins on itself while travelling forward. Normally the roller spins at the same speed as its own forward motion, much like a steam roller flattening tarmac, and the resulting sheet has a smooth surface. In the manufacture of rippled glass, the roller spins faster than its own forward motion. The rippled effect is retained as the glass cools.

=== Drapery glass ===
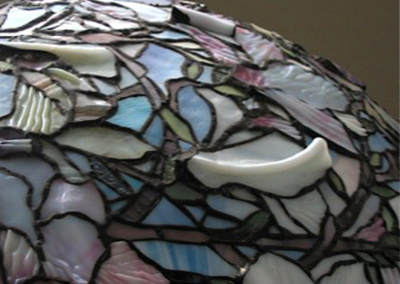
Pieces of drapery glass in a lampshade

Drapery glass refers to a sheet of heavily folded glass that suggests fabric folds. Tiffany made abundant use of drapery glass in ecclesiastical stained glass windows to add a three-dimensional effect to flowing robes and angel wings, and to imitate the natural coarseness of magnolia petals. The making of drapery glass requires skill and experience. A small diameter hand-held roller is manipulated forcefully over a sheet of molten glass to produce heavy ripples, while folding and creasing the entire sheet. The ripples become rigid and permanent as the glass cools. Each sheet produced from this artisanal process is unique.

== Locations and collections ==
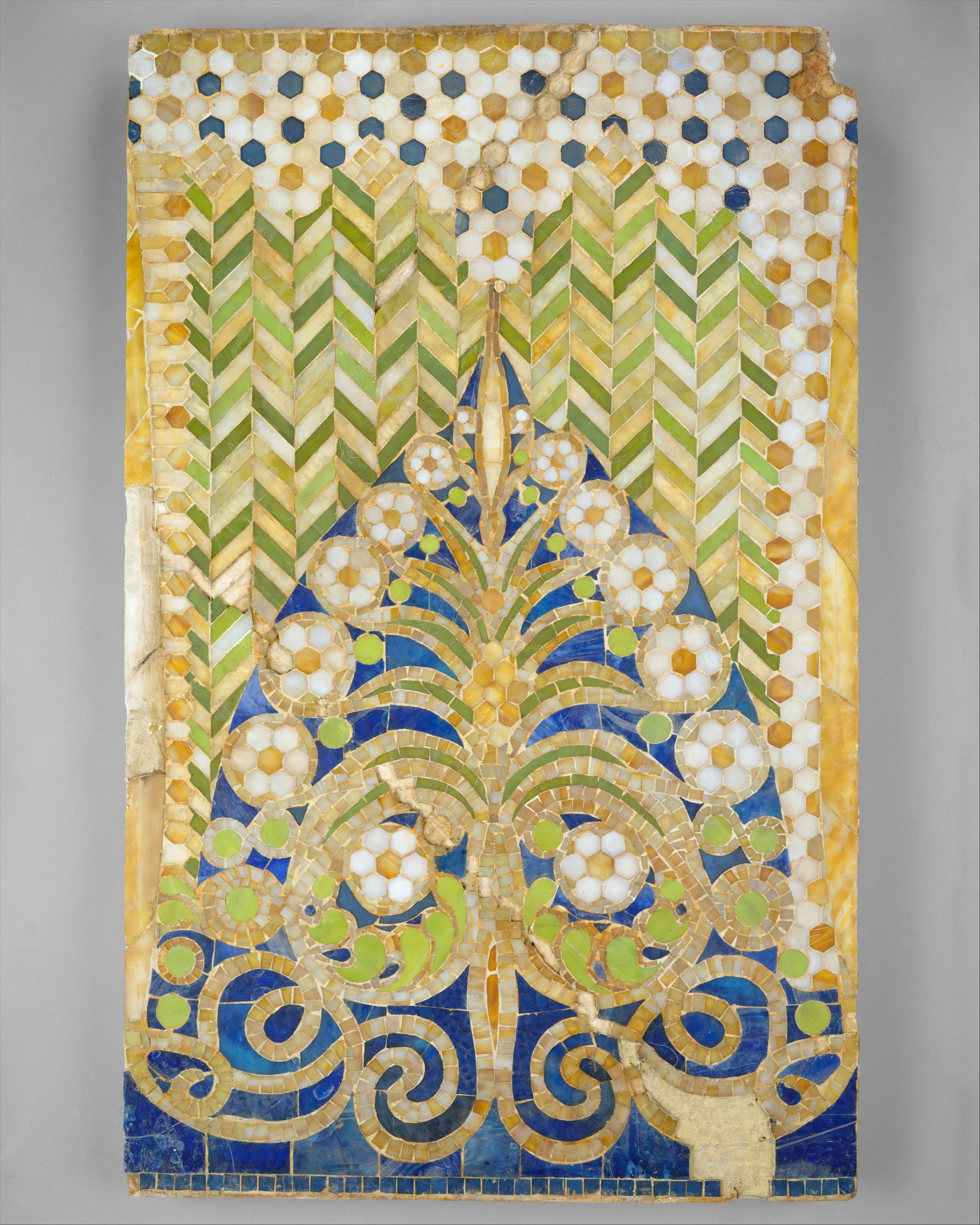
Glass mosaic panel circa 1890–91, in the Metropolitan Museum of Art

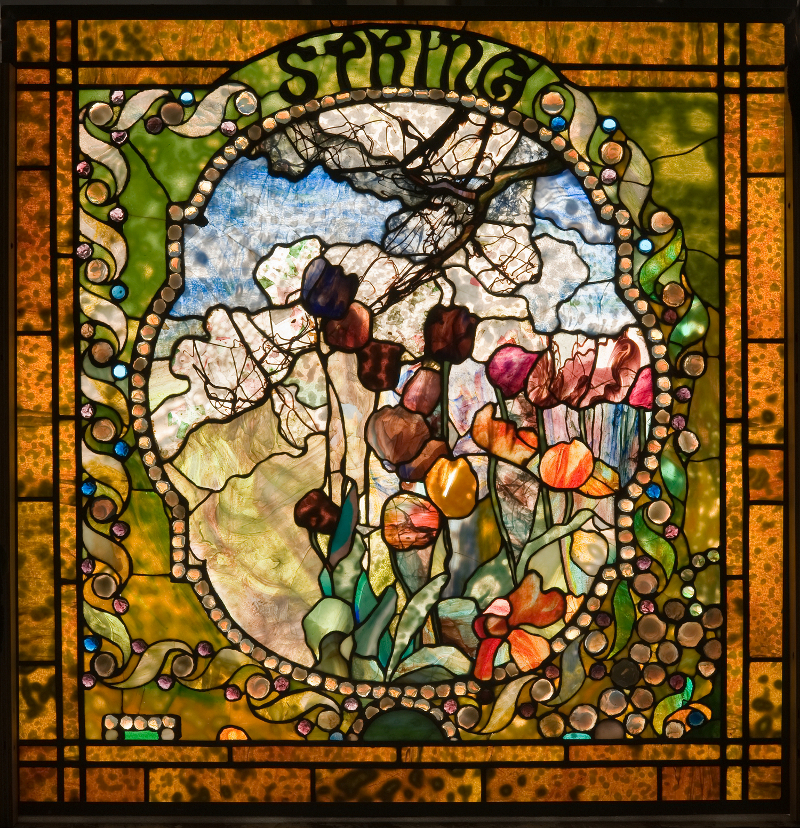
"Spring" panel from The Four Seasons from Tiffany's Long Island estate, Laurelton Hall, now in the Charles Hosmer Morse Museum of American Art

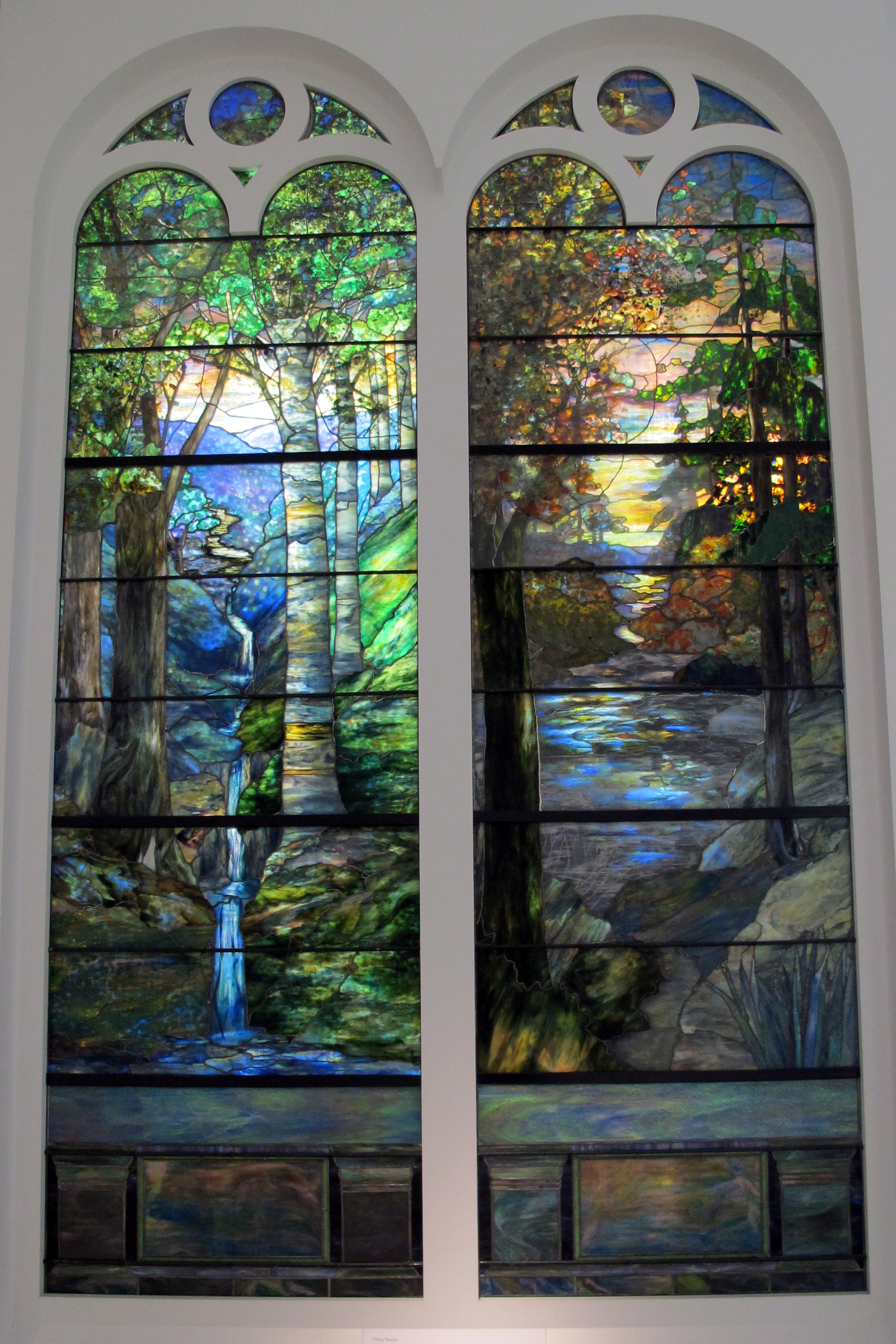
Windows with sunrise in the forest at springtime, and autumn sunset (1905), in the collection of the Brooklyn Museum

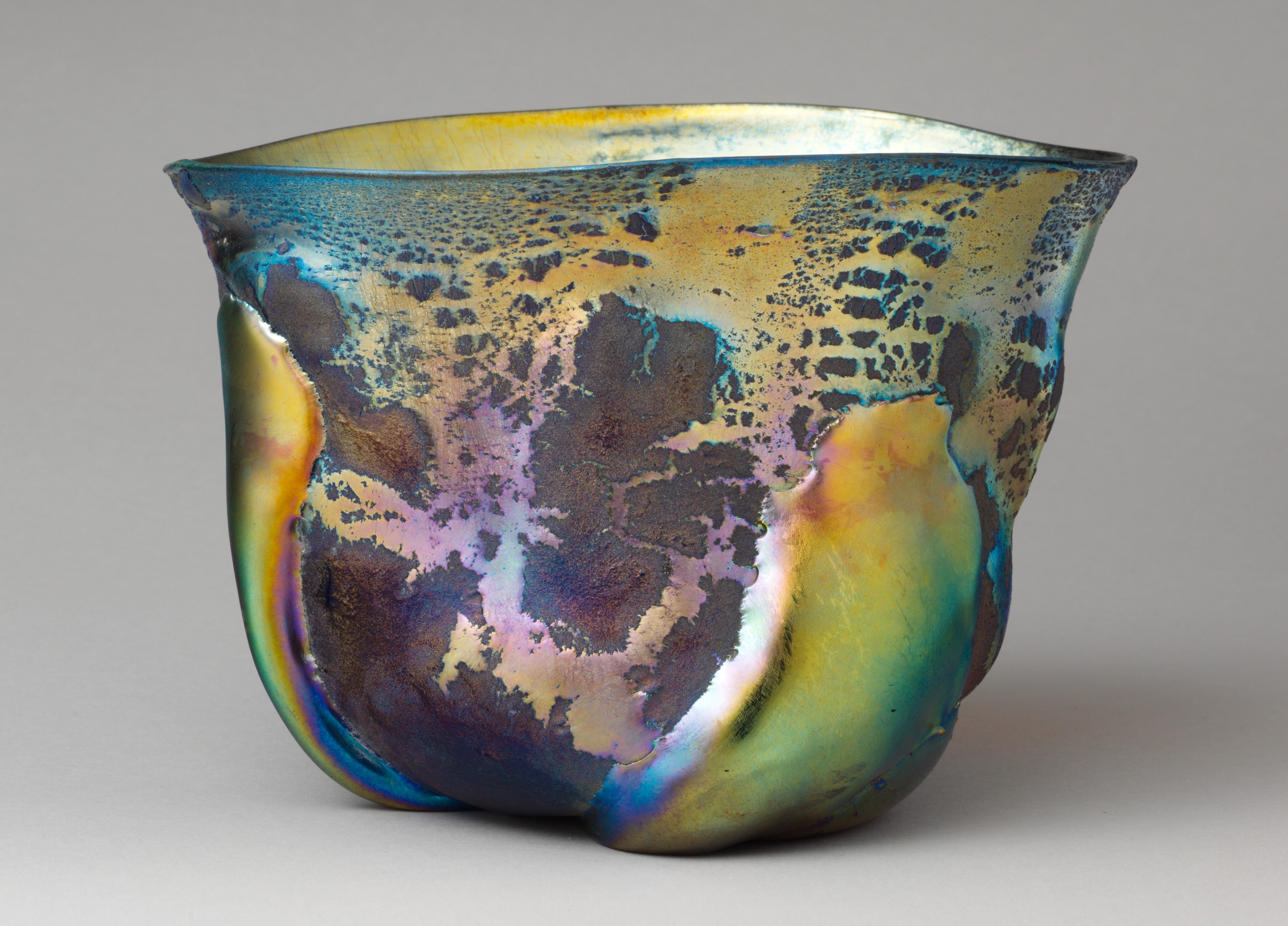
Blown glass bowl, c. 1908

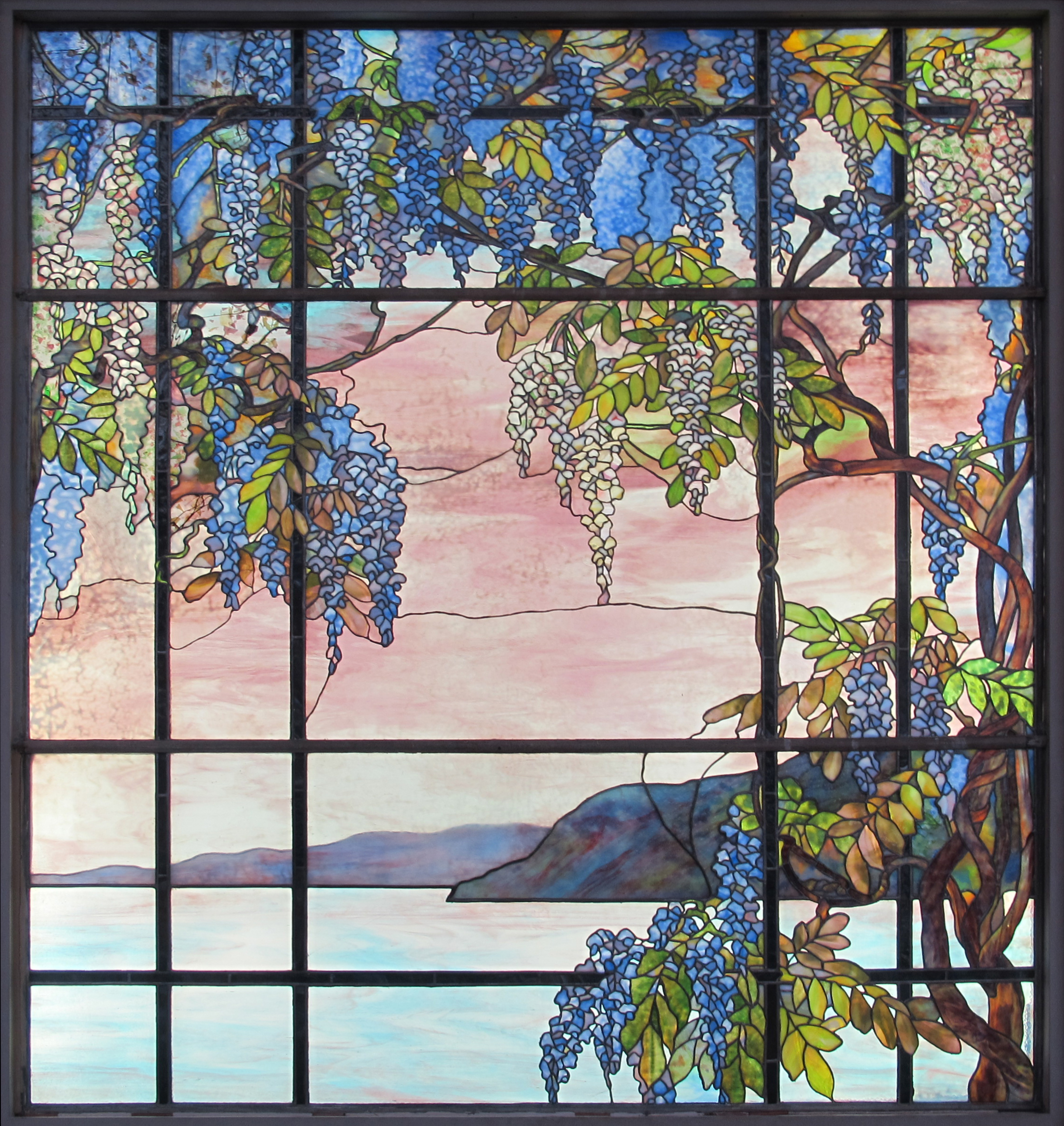
Window from Louis C. Tiffany's house in Oyster Bay, New York, c. 1908, now in the Metropolitan Museum of Art

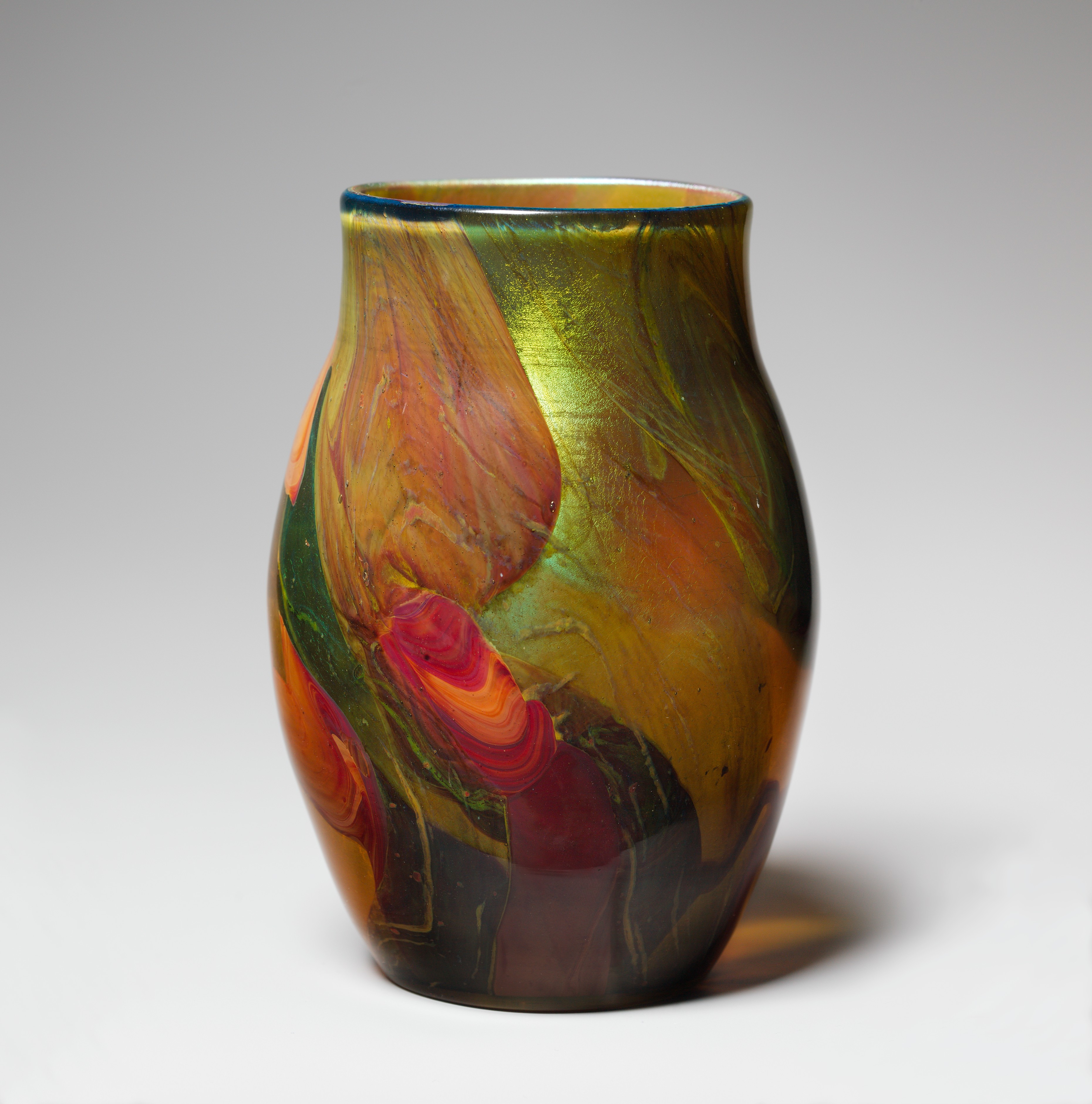
Vase circa 1910

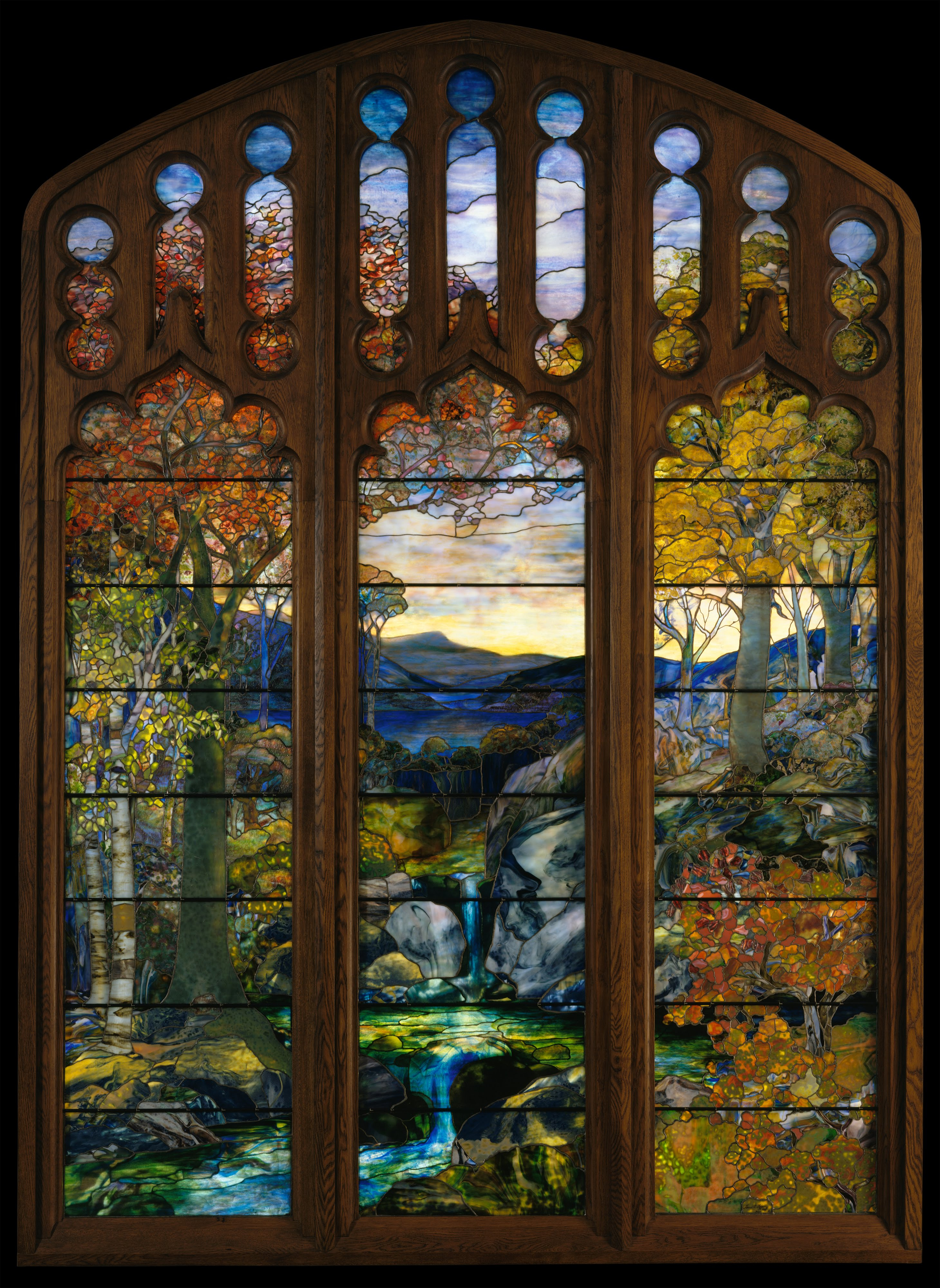
Autumn Landscape, circa 1923–1924, designed by Agnes Northrop, in the collection of the Metropolitan Museum of Art

=== Museums ===
- England
  - Haworth Art Gallery
- United States
  - Florida
    - Charles Hosmer Morse Museum of American Art, Winter Park
  - Illinois
    - Art Institute of Chicago
    - Halim Time and Glass Museum, Evanston
    - Driehaus Museum, Chicago
  - Louisiana
    - Newcomb Art Museum, Tulane University, New Orleans
  - Michigan
    - Ella Sharp Museum of Art and History, Jackson
    - Meadow Brook Hall, Rochester
    - University of Michigan Museum of Art, Ann Arbor
  - New York
    - Brooklyn Museum
    - Metropolitan Museum of Art, Manhattan, New York City
    - Neustadt Collection of Tiffany Glass, Queens Museum, Queens, New York City
    - New-York Historical Society, Manhattan, New York City
  - Pennsylvania
    - Allentown Art Museum
  - Texas
    - Dallas Museum of Art
    - Museum of Fine Arts, Houston
  - Virginia
    - Virginia Museum of Fine Arts, Richmond
  - Wisconsin
    - Charles Allis Art Museum, Milwaukee

=== Stained glass in situ ===
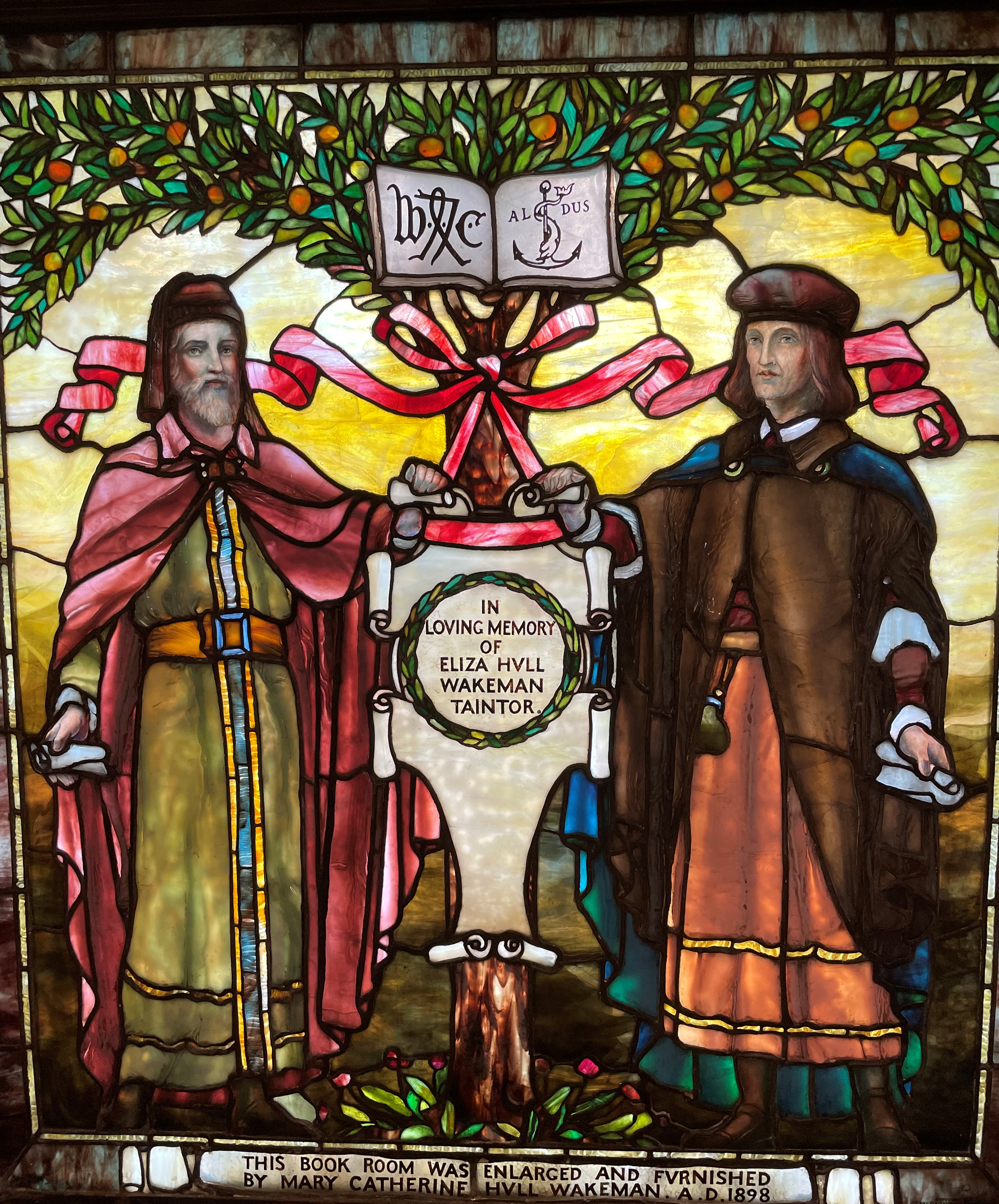
Central frame of Pequot Library triptych, completed in 1898 as a gift from Southport's Wakeman Family. Shows tree of knowledge, as well as early printers William Caxton and Aldus Manutius

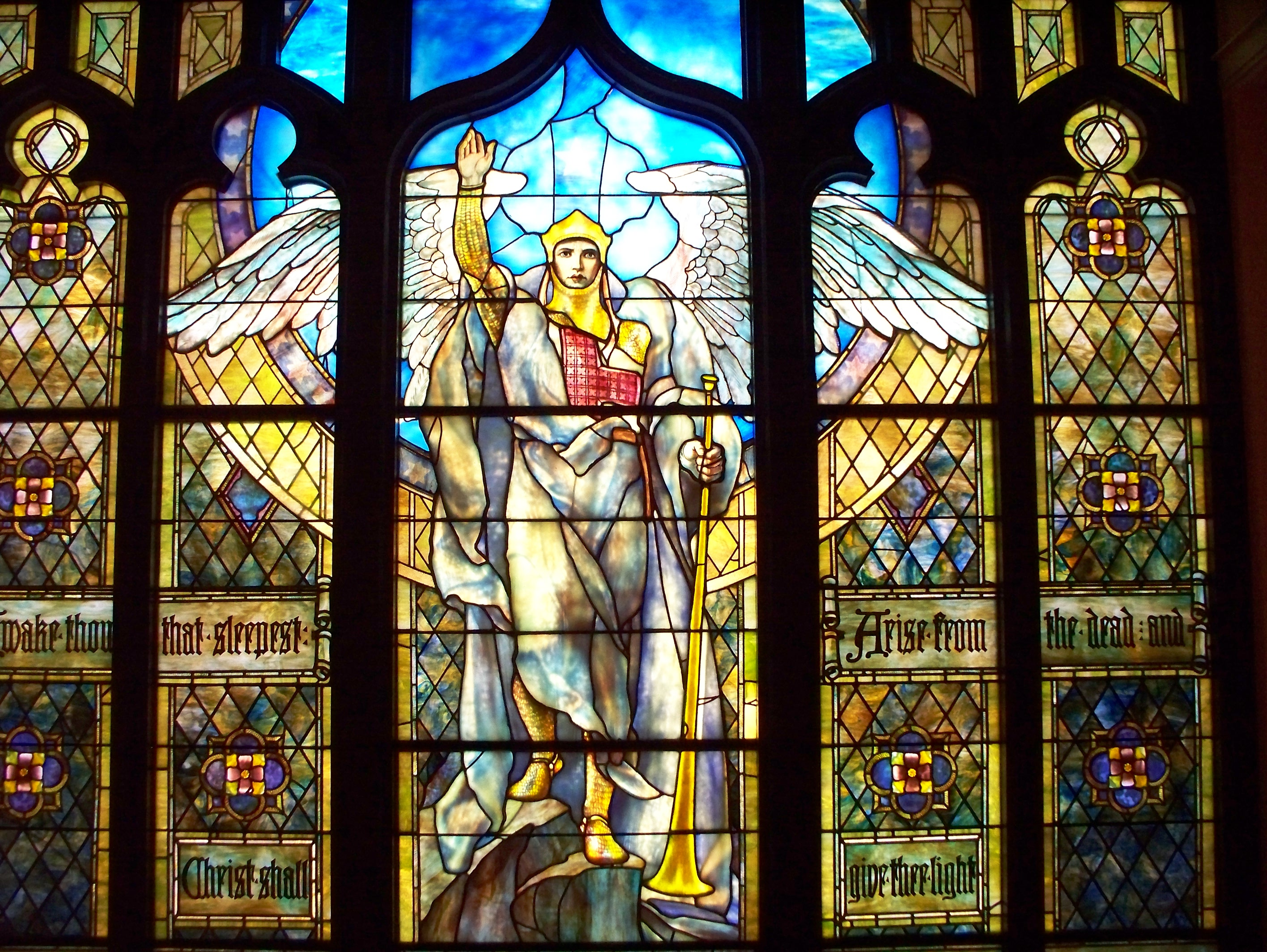
Angel of the Resurrection by Frederick Wilson in the First Presbyterian Church, Indianapolis (1905)

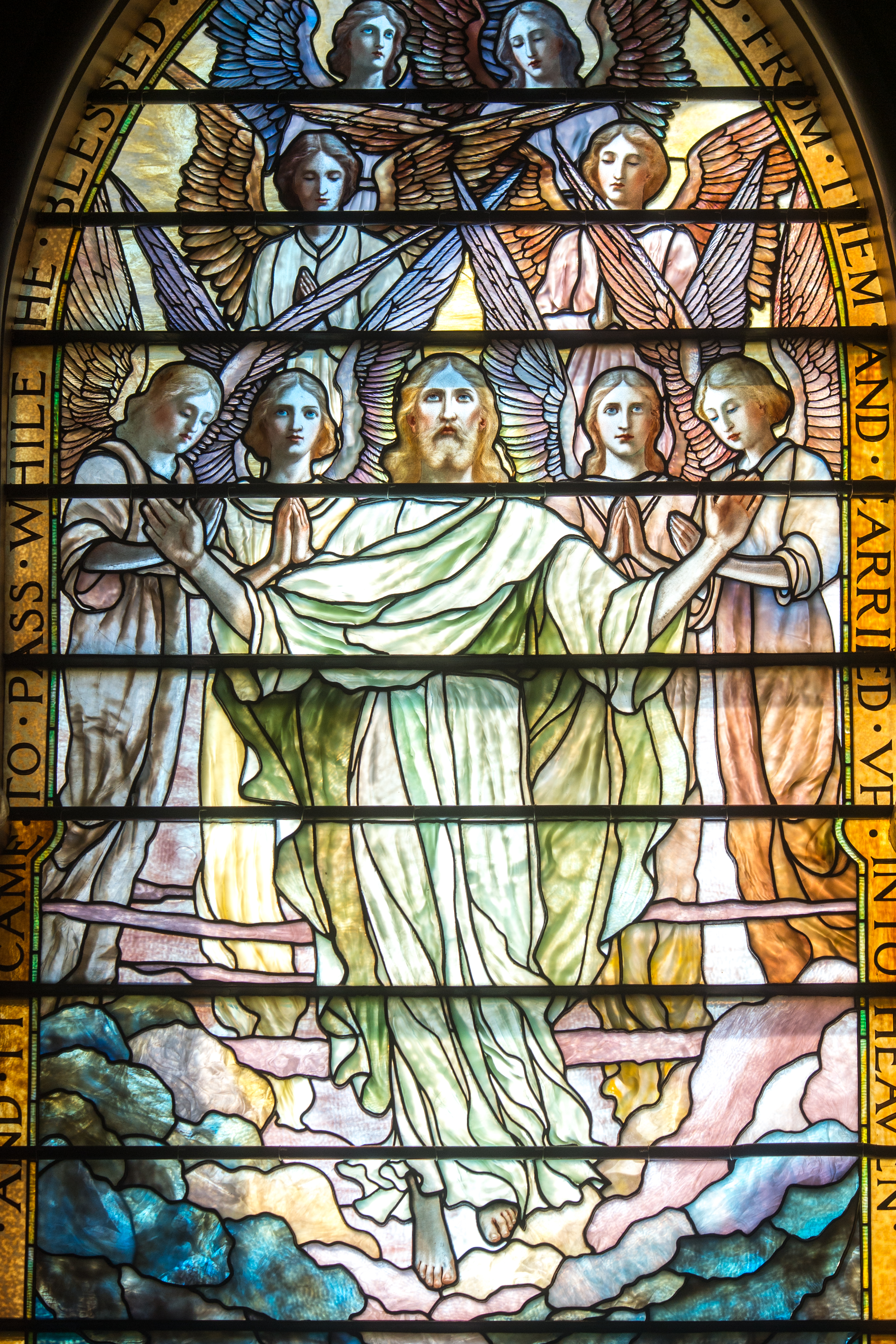
Tiffany Glass Decorating Company panel inside Calvary United Methodist Church in Pittsburgh (1895)

- Canada
  - Ontario
    - London – St Paul's Cathedral, four windows, two signed by Tiffany
  - Quebec
    - Montreal – Montreal Museum of Fine Arts, Bourgie Pavilion (formerly Erskine and American United Church), twenty windows signed by Tiffany
- Mexico
  - Mexico City – Palacio de Bellas Artes (Note: Stage "curtain" which is a stained glass foldable panel created out of nearly a million pieces of iridescent colored glass by Tiffany's in New York.)
  - Mexico City – Gran Hotel Ciudad de México
- Scotland
  - Aberdeenshire – St Peter's Kirk, Fyvie
  - Dunfermline – Dunfermline Abbey
  - Edinburgh – Parish Church of Saint Cuthbert
- United States
  - Alabama
    - Mobile – Christ Church Cathedral
  - Arizona
    - Douglas – Gadsden Hotel
  - California
    - Vallejo – St. Peter's Chapel, Mare Island, 25 windows by Tiffany
  - Colorado
    - Colorado Springs – First United Methodist Church
  - Connecticut
    - Southport
      - Pequot Library Association
    - Hartford
      - First Church of Christ and Ancient Burial Ground
      - Mark Twain House
    - New London
      - St. James Episcopal Church
    - New Haven –
      - Center Church on the Green
      - Trinity Lutheran Church
  - Florida
    - St. Augustine – Flagler College
  - Georgia
    - Atlanta – All Saints' Episcopal Church
    - Jekyll Island – Faith Chapel
    - Macon – St. Paul's Episcopal Church
    - Savannah – Gryphon Tea Room
    - Thomasville – St. Thomas Episcopal Church
  - Illinois
    - Chicago –
      - Macy's on State Street, formerly Marshall Field's
      - Second Presbyterian Church on South Michigan Avenue
      - Chicago Cultural Center
    - Springfield – First Presbyterian Church
    - Tinley Park – St. Andrew's Anglican Church
  - Indiana
    - Indianapolis – Second Presbyterian Church
    - Richmond – Reid Center, formerly Reid Memorial Presbyterian Church
  - Iowa
    - Dubuque – St. Luke's United Methodist Church
  - Kansas
    - Topeka – First Presbyterian Church
  - Kentucky
    - Covington – Trinity Episcopal Church
  - Louisiana
    - Baton Rouge - St. James Episcopal Church
    - New Orleans – Tulane University
  - Maine
    - Portland – Masonic Temple
  - Maryland
    - Baltimore – Brown Memorial Presbyterian Church
  - Massachusetts
    - Boston –
      - Arlington Street Church
      - Church of the Covenant
    - Wellesley – Houghton Memorial Chapel at Wellesley College
    - Nantucket – St. Paul's Episcopal Church
  - Michigan
    - Ann Arbor –
      - Unitarian Universalist Church (Hobbs & Black)
      - Newberry Hall (Kelsey Museum of Archeology)
    - Grand Rapids –
      - Ladies Literary Club
      - Temple Emanuel
    - Marquette –
      - The Resurrection Window, Morgan Chapel, St. Paul's Episcopal Church
  - Minnesota
    - Stillwater – Episcopal Church of the Ascension
  - Mississippi
    - University – Ventress Hall at The University of Mississippi Tribute to the University Greys
  - Missouri
    - Kansas City – St. Mary's Episcopal Church
    - Kirkwood – Grace Episcopal Church
    - Clayton – Central Presbyterian Church
  - New Hampshire
    - Bretton Woods – Mount Washington Hotel
  - New Jersey
    - Hackensack – Second Reformed Church
    - Maplewood – Morrow Memorial United Methodist Church
    - New Brunswick – Kirkpatrick Chapel at Rutgers, The State University of New Jersey
  - New York
    - Albany – First Presbyterian Church of Albany
    - Albion – Pullman Memorial Universalist Church
    - Auburn – Willard Chapel
    - Bath – First Presbyterian Church
    - Beacon – St. Andrew's Church
    - Briarcliff Manor – Congregational Church
    - Buffalo – St. Paul's Episcopal Cathedral
    - Irvington –
      - Irvington Presbyterian Church
      - Irvington Town Hall – Clock face and reading room
    - Lockport – First Presbyterian Church
    - New York City –
      - Brooklyn –
        - Brown Memorial Baptist Church and church house
        - Flatbush Reformed Church and church house
        - First Unitarian Congregational Society and Rev. Donald McKinney chapel
      - Manhattan –
        - Grand Central Terminal – 13-foot (4.0 m) clock face on south facade
        - West End Collegiate Church, West End Avenue
        - St. Michael's Church, New York City, Amsterdam Avenue at 99th Street
        - Holy Trinity Lutheran Church
    - Roslyn – Trinity Episcopal Church
    - Roxbury – Jay Gould Memorial Reformed Church
    - Saugerties – St. Mary of the Snow, 36 Cedar Street
    - Troy – Troy Public Library St. Joseph's Catholic Church – St. Paul's Episcopal Church
    - Tuxedo Park – St. Mary's-in-Tuxedo Episcopal Church
    - Garden City – St Paul's School, endangered glass
    - Washingtonville – Moffat Library
  - Ohio
    - Cleveland – Wade Memorial Chapel in Lake View Cemetery
    - Dayton –
      - Westminster Presbyterian Church, 125 N. Wilkinson Street
      - Historic Woodland Cemetery & Arboretum, 118 Woodland Avenue
  - Pennsylvania
    - Altoona – St. Lukes Episcopal Church
    - Brownsville – Christ Church
    - Erie –
      - Cathedral of St. Paul
      - First Presbyterian Church
    - Franklin – St. John's Episcopal Church
    - Franklin – Christ's Church
    - Kittanning – Grace Presbyterian Church
    - Lancaster – First Presbyterian Church
    - Lewistown –
      - St. Mark's Episcopal Church
      - First United Methodist Church
    - Montgomery Township – Robert Kennedy Memorial Presbyterian Church
    - New Castle – St. Jude's Episcopal Church, formerly known as Trinity Episcopal Church
    - Philadelphia –
      - Calvary Center for Culture and Community
      - Church of the Holy Trinity
      - The Curtis Center formerly The Curtis Building - See The Dream Garden
      - First Presbyterian Church
      - St. Stephen's Episcopal Church
      - Tenth Presbyterian Church
    - Pittsburgh –
      - Calvary United Methodist Church
      - Emmanuel Episcopal Church
      - Shadyside Presbyterian Church
      - First Presbyterian Church
      - Third Presbyterian Church
      - St. Andrews Episcopal Church
    - Sewickley –
      - First Presbyterian Church
      - St. Stephen's Episcopal Church
    - Sharon – Buhl Mausoleum
    - Titusville – St. James Memorial Episcopal Church
    - Uniontown –
      - Trinity United Presbyterian Church
      - St. Peter's Anglican Church
    - Whitemarsh Township – St. Thomas' Church
    - Williamsport – Christ Community Worship Center, formerly the Presbyterian Church of the Covenant
  - Tennessee
    - Chattanooga – Basilica of Sts. Peter and Paul
    - Memphis – Grace-St. Luke's Episcopal Church
  - Texas
    - Galveston – Trinity Episcopal Church
    - Houston – Christ Church Cathedral
  - Utah
    - Salt Lake City –
      - Salt Lake Temple
      - St. Mark's Episcopal Cathedral
  - Vermont
    - St. Johnsbury – Grace United Methodist Church
  - Virginia
    - Newport News – St. Paul's Episcopal Church
    - Norfolk – St. Paul's Episcopal Church
    - Richmond – Congregation Beth Ahabah
    - Petersburg – Blandford Church
    - Staunton – Trinity Episcopal Church
  - Washington
    - Seattle – Pierre P. Ferry House
  - Wisconsin
    - Menomonie – Mabel Tainter Memorial Building
    - Milwaukee – Charles Allis Art Museum
    - Milwaukee – St. Paul's Episcopal Church
    - Oshkosh – Oshkosh Public Museum

== See also ==
- Education (Chittenden Memorial Window)
- The Sunset Scene
- Tiffany Chapel
- Tiffany & Co.
