= Second Reformed Church Hackensack =

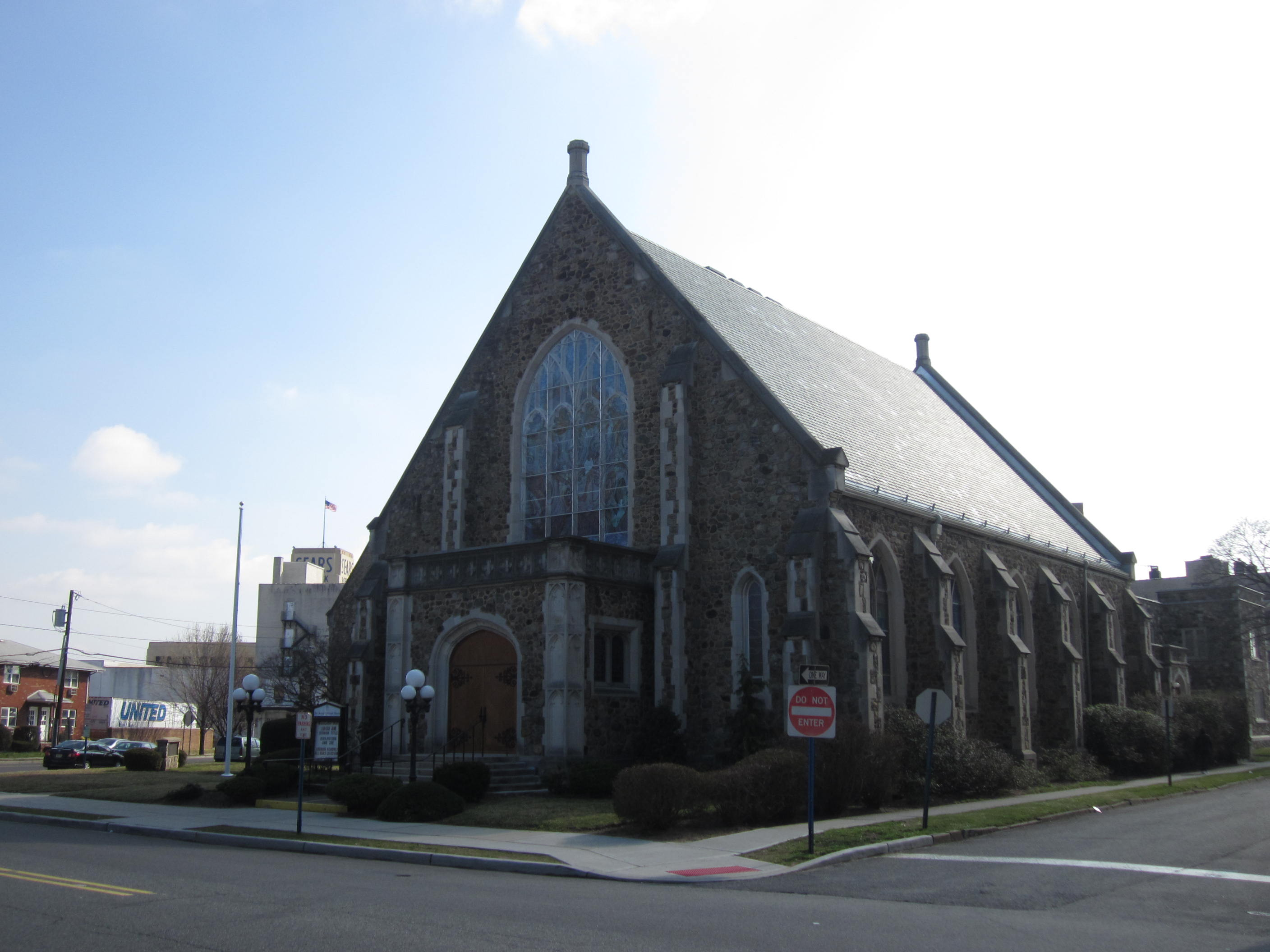
- Interactive map of the Second Reformed Church Hackensack area

General information
- Location: 436 Union St, Hackensack, United States
- Coordinates: 40.891869°N 74.041042°W
- Groundbreaking: June 21, 1908
- Owner: Reformed Church in America

The Second Reformed Church of Hackensack is a church in Hackensack, New Jersey, located at the intersections of Anderson, Union and Ward Streets. The church is a member of the Reformed Church in America. Some of Louis Comfort Tiffany's favorite stained glass windows are at the church. Tiffany would bring clients to the church to help them select from the church's broad designs. There are 10 Tiffany windows ranging in design from realistic styles to impressionistic styles.

== History ==
The congregation was created on October 31, 1855. The first services were held in the First Reformed Dutch Church, Hackensack. The building was erected starting on July 30, 1856, on the corner of State and Berry Streets. The land had been donated by Maria Berry and her family. The cornerstone was laid by Reverend John Knox from Manhattan, New York City. The construction was completed in 1857.

This first building was destroyed in a fire on April 15, 1907. The church had just celebrated its 50th anniversary of its completion the previous month. They had made their last mortgage payment. The fire started at a nearby carpenter's shop. The interior of the church had just been redecorated.

The cornerstone of the present church building was laid on June 21, 1908. The building had a parsonage that has been sold. The church is constructed of native field stones from the stone walls of nearby farms. In 1965 an administrative wing was added to the church.

In 1991 the New Community Church of Teaneck was merged into the Second Reformed Church.

== Pastors ==
The pastors are as follows:

Pastor	Term start	Term end	Notes
James Demarest	1856	1863	He was born in 1832. He died in 1913.
George H. Fisher	1864	1870	
Cyrus Bervick Durand	1871	1883	He was born on July 27, 1836, in Manhattan, New York City, to Cyrus Durand and Phoebe Wade. He attended Rutgers University from 1854 to 1858, A. B., 1858; A. M., 1862. He attended the New Brunswick Theological Seminary, B.D., 1862. In 1863 he married Sarah Merrereau; children, Jennie, Juliet. He became the pastor of the Reformed Church in Preakness, New Jersey, from 1863 to 1868; the Reformed Church in Boonton, New Jersey, from 1868 to 1871; the Reformed Church in Hackensack from 1871 to 1882 or 1883; Assistant rector Calvary Episcopal Church, New York, from 1882 to 1885. He was rector of the St. James Church in Newark, New Jersey, from 1885 to at least 1900.
Arthur Johnson	1884	1923	
John Charles Rauscher	1923	1945	He was born on 1 March 1873 in Corona, Queens. He was previously at the Twelfth Street Reformed Church in Brooklyn, New York City.
Harvey B. Hoffman	1945	1961	
Daniel Y. Brink	1962	1969	
Robert A. Phillips	1969	1970	He was an associate pastor.
Edwin G. Mulder	1970	1976	He was the general secretary of the Reformed Church in America from 1983 to August 31, 1994. He graduated from the Western Theological Seminary in Holland, Michigan, in 1954.
David H. Manting	1976	1979	He was an associate pastor.
Jack K. White	1980	1988	
Jon N. Norton	1989	1995	He served three churches: Fort Lee, New Jersey, Hackensack, New Jersey, and Spring Valley, New York. He was the executive minister of the Reformed Church in America Synod of New York.
Dennis B. Wilcox	1995	2012	He was born on July 27, 1945, in Grand Rapids, Michigan. He married Carol Lynn Kolkman of Grandville, Michigan, in 1966. He attended Hope College in Holland, Michigan, and graduated in 1967. Dennis was ordained by the Classis of North Grand Rapids in June 1971. He was then the pastor of the Peace Reformed Church in Mt. Prospect, Illinois. From August 1975 until July 1982, he served as the pastor of the Calvary Reformed Church of Holland, Michigan. In August 1982, he became pastor of the Central Reformed Church in Sioux Center, Iowa. In January 1995, he became the Pastor of the Second Reformed Church in Hackensack, New Jersey. He also serves as the chaplain of the Hackensack Fire Department. In May 2003, he was named as a Fellow in Pastoral Leadership Development by the Princeton Theological Seminary in Princeton, New Jersey.

== Windows ==
The Second Reformed Church is famous for its Tiffany glass windows. One example is The Angels of Praise, a large window that was part of the 1893 International Exhibition in Chicago.

== See also ==
- First Reformed Dutch Church, Hackensack
