= Uroboros Glass =

Glass manufacturer in Portland, Oregon, U.S.

Coordinates: 45.53844°N 122.67224°W

- Founded: 1973; 53 years ago
- Founder: Eric Lovell
- Products: Glass
- Owner: Youghiogheny Opalescent Glass, Inc

Uroboros Glass was an art glass manufacturer in Portland, Oregon.

== History ==
The company was founded by Eric Lovell in 1973. In the late sixties, Lovell had rediscovered the glass-making technique of ring mottle glass, which was invented by Tiffany Studios and lost when it closed in 1928.

In 2017, the company's assets were sold to Oceanside Glass & Tile, based out of Carlsbad, California, The Portland facility stopped making sheets of glass by February 2017. following discovery of cadmium pollution near its site. Oceanside moved production to Tijuana, Mexico, and ended the Uroboros name.

Following this, the Uroboros Glass company was sold by Oceanside Glass & Tile in 2019 to Connelsville, Pennsylvania based Youghiogheny Opalescent Glass, Inc. Additionally, Youghiogheny Opalescent Glass took over licensing and production of Uroboros' highly regarded System 96 brand as well.
