= Irvington Town Hall =

- U.S. National Register of Historic Places
- U.S. Historic district – Contributing property
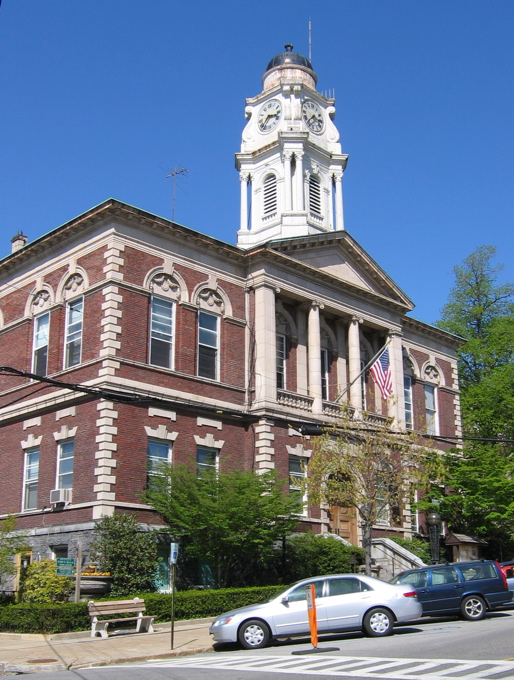
- Front (south) elevation, 2006
- Location: Irvington, NY
- Nearest city: Yonkers
- Coordinates: 41°02′20″N 73°52′05″W
- Area: less than one acre
- Built: 1902
- Architect: Alfred J. Manning
- Architectural style: Colonial Revival
- Part of: Irvington Historic District (ID01300195)
- NRHP reference No.: 84000205
- Added to NRHP: November 1, 1984

Irvington Town Hall (Note: Despite the name of this building, Irvington is incorporated as a village under New York law, and is part of the town of Greenburgh.) is located on Main Street in the village of Irvington in the U.S. state of New York. In addition to being home to the village government, police department, and until 2000 the public library, it has a public reading room in keeping with the requirements of the original land deed. A 432-seat theatre, used for many local gatherings such as school graduations, was also built on the second story.

The Town Hall was built in 1902 from a design by local architect Albert J. Manning, an early use of the Colonial Revival architectural style for a civic building. The inside also features glasswork and mosaics by Louis Comfort Tiffany, whose father, Charles Lewis Tiffany, had an estate in the village. These two factors led to its listing on the National Register of Historic Places in 1984, and has also been a contributing property to the Irvington Historic District since 2014.

== Building ==
The two-story brick building is seven bays square on a raised basement of randomly coursed stone. The facade is trimmed in terra cotta and stone. The former is used for the window lintels and sills as well as an intermediate cornice; the latter for the water table. It is topped with a shallow hipped roof that has some of its original metal sheathing.

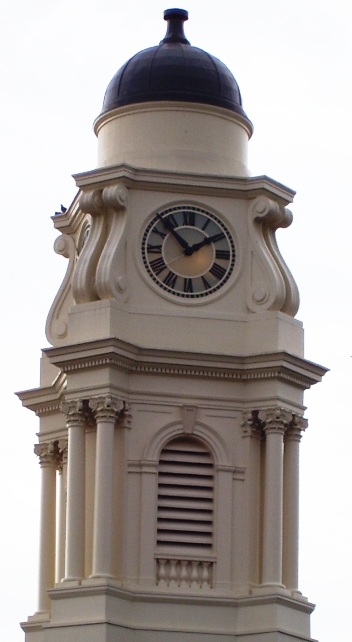
Clock tower detail

At the second story of the front facade, there is a balustraded projecting portico three bays wide with freestanding engaged Ionic columns and Doric pilasters supporting a full entablature with denticulated pediment. It is in turn topped with a three-stage wooden clock tower with round-arched louvered openings, paired Corinthian columns supporting block entablatures and paired scroll brackets. The very top of Town Hall is the clock tower's domed roof. This feature has made the clock tower one of Irvington's most recognizable local landmarks.

The main entrance uses an arched Gibbs-style surround. The building's trim materials show up in the form of solid stone balustrades that curl to form newel posts at the sidewalk, and terra cotta quoins. The rear facade is less detailed, with terra cotta used only for the coping of the stepped cornice; stone and brick are used everywhere else.

Much of the interior is in paneled dark wood, with wainscoting in some rooms. In the library, the dark wood is used for ceiling beams with famous literary quotations inscribed in gold leaf. It is lit by chandeliers and lanterns designed by Louis Comfort Tiffany. Its plaster walls give way to a domed ceiling and display niches in the main area, with some open areas featuring decorative corbels.

The theater features a complete orchestra and balcony section, with the private booths featuring round openings separated by Doric posts with Adamesque detail. The proscenium arch also includes heavy classical detailing.

== History ==
The property where Town Hall now stands was first developed in 1869, when a local organization called the Mental and Moral Improvement Society built what it called the Atheneum, which housed a circulating library. During the last decades of the 19th century, the village grew rapidly, and by the 1890s needed a central place to house its various governmental functions. In 1892 the society conveyed the Atheneum property to the village with the condition that it maintain, in perpetuity, a library and reading room in the building and construct the building within five years.

After the village had not been able to find a suitable architect by 1897, the society agreed to a five-year extension. Manning, a former office manager to New York City architect Robert Robertson, finally produced a design the village liked, and it was completed and opened in 1902, at the end of the extension. Financial assistance came from some of the village's wealthier residents. Frederick W. Guiteau, a member of the society, endowed the library with $10,000 which he had apparently originally intended to bequeath to it in his will. Helen Gould, who had grown up in the nearby Lyndhurst estate as the daughter of Jay Gould, contributed the cost of the interior finishings and made Tiffany's work possible. The Arts and Crafts furniture she bought is still in use.

The new town hall became the center of Irvington's public life the village had envisioned. The theatre in particular was used for public events such as school graduation ceremonies, police and fire balls, plays and other cultural events. Eleanor Roosevelt spoke at a Democratic rally just before her husband was elected President in 1932. Opera singer Lillian Nordica performed there, and Ted Mack auditioned talent for his Original Amateur Hour there as well.

In the mid-20th century, the library needed space and took over the stair area leading up to the theater. A tower was added to the rear exterior to compensate. After the state fire code was revised in the 1960s, however, the theatre no longer met those standards and could not be used as a public space. The library used it as storage space afterwards, with a few occasional public exhibitions, as it continued to deteriorate. In 1978, the Irvington Town Hall Theatre Group raised $100,000, mostly from the village, for the necessary improvements and restoration of earlier period details such as light fixtures. It reopened in late 1981 and has been in use ever since.

By the 1990s the library was again in need of space, and had to comply with the Americans with Disabilities Act requiring greater physical accessibility. It moved into another local historic structure, the Lord and Burnham Building on South Astor Street, but a reading room, the so-called "Tiffany Room", remains in the Town Hall, to fulfill the requirements of the original deed.

== See also ==
- National Register of Historic Places listings in southern Westchester County, New York
