= Angel of the Resurrection =

Stained glass window designed by Tiffany Studios

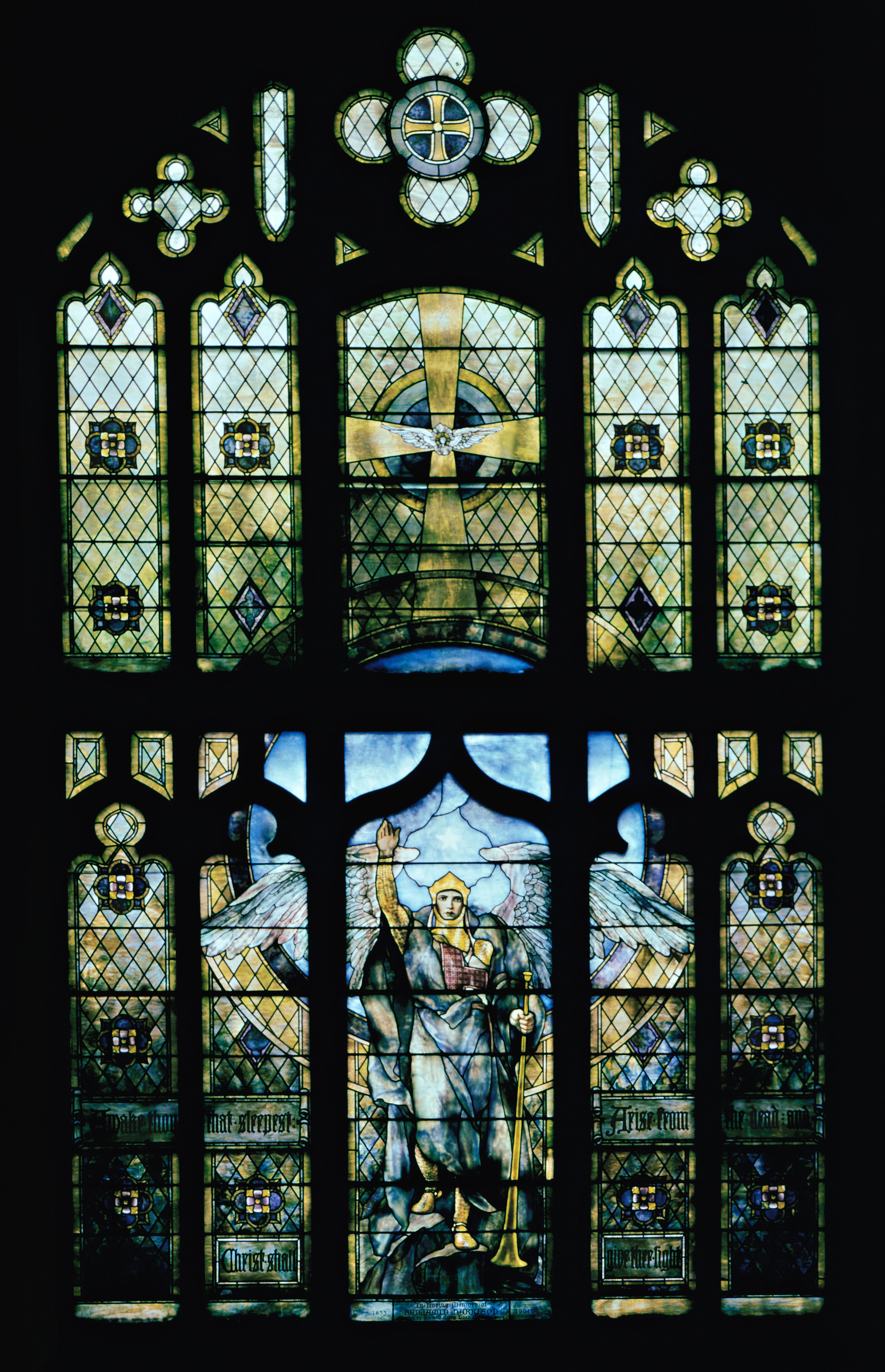
- Artist: Tiffany Studios, Frederick Wilson (artist)
- Year: 1904
- Type: Stained glass
- Dimensions: 430 cm × 10 cm × 880 cm (168 in × 4 in × 348 in)
- Location: Indianapolis Museum of Art; Indianapolis

Angel of the Resurrection is a massive stained glass window by the American Art Nouveau glass manufacturer Tiffany Studios, now in the collection of the Indianapolis Museum of Art (IMA). It was commissioned by former-First Lady Mary Dimmick Harrison as a memorial to her husband, President Benjamin Harrison. Designed by Frederick Wilson and completed in 1904, the window depicts the Archangel Michael calling for the dead to rise at the Second Coming.

== Description ==
Although his trumpet often leads to the assumption that the angel here is Gabriel, he is in fact Michael, using the trumpet to signal the dead to rise again. Dressed in chainmail like a crusading knight from the books of Sir Walter Scott, Michael cuts a dashing figure in keeping with the era's romanticism. Although Tiffany was absorbed in numerous other projects at the time, he gave his team of gifted designers input before bestowing his approval upon the final composition. Several of his brilliant innovations in glass manufacturing are visible in this piece, including the swirling opalescence of his trademark mottled glass, drapery glass in Michael's robes, and the ruffling on the wings to resemble feathers. The assembly was equally innovative, with lead not merely holding the glass in place but defining the image and creating linear effects. Furthermore, his layering of glass creates dazzling depths and color effects. "Awake Thou That Sleepest. Arise from the Dead and Christ Shall Give Thee Light" from Ephesians 5:14 is inscribed on the window.

== Historical information ==
Angel of the Resurrection was commissioned in 1901 for the First Presbyterian Congregation in Indianapolis, by Mary Lord Harrison in memory of her husband, President Benjamin Harrison. The church had particular importance for Harrison, who had been a church elder for over forty years. The total cost, including installation and external glass protection, was $1500.

=== Location history ===
The window was originally housed at First Presbyterian Church (now Redeemer Presbyterian Church & the Harrison Center) at the corner of 16th and Delaware Streets in Indianapolis, Indiana. The window was housed in the southside of the church from its dedication in 1905, until it was donated to the IMA in 1972. The original watercolor sketch by Frederick Wilson, a Tiffany designer, resides at the Benjamin Harrison Home. Angel of the Resurrection has the acquisition number 72.75. It is currently on view in the Hunt Rotunda Gallery.

== See also ==
- Education (Chittenden Memorial Window)
- Benjamin Harrison
- Frederick Wilson
- Tiffany Studios
- Indianapolis Museum of Art
