= Alfred Godwin =

American stained glass artist (1850-1934)

- Born: January 21, 1850; Manchester, England
- Died: July 19, 1934 (aged 84)
- Resting place: West Laurel Hill Cemetery, Bala Cynwyd, Pennsylvania, U.S.
- Occupation: Stained glass artist

Alfred Godwin (January 21, 1850 – July 19, 1934) was an English-born, American stained-glass artist. He founded the firm Alfred Godwin & Co. in 1883. His work was exhibited at the 1904 St. Louis World's Fair and installed at numerous churches and buildings including The Bellevue-Stratford Hotel in Philadelphia and the Pennsylvania State Capitol in Harrisburg, Pennsylvania.

== Early life ==
Godwin was born January 21, 1850, in Manchester, England, and moved to Philadelphia in 1870.

== Career ==
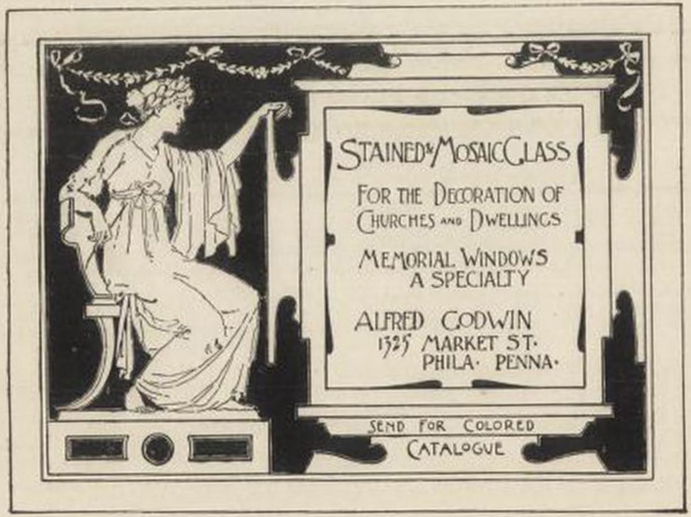
A Godwin advertisement in 1892

He opened a stained glass window business in Philadelphia in 1878. He worked alone until 1883, when he entered into a partnership with William Reith, and founded the firm Alfred Godwin & Co. Among the artists employed by Alfred Godwin & Company were Thomas G. Aickin, William Willet, R. Appleby Miller, Frederick Wilson, and Horace Rudy.

An 1891 advertisement lists their shop at 1325 Market Street in Philadelphia. He was part of the short-lived "Association of Art Workers" (1893-1895), a team of Philadelphia artisans, furniture-makers and decorators who would collaborate on multiple aspects of a design project.

Godwin exhibited his church stained glass windows at the 1904 St. Louis World's Fair, including four pieces of work titled Angel of the Annunciation, Virgin Mary, Knights in Armor, and Angel Gabriel.

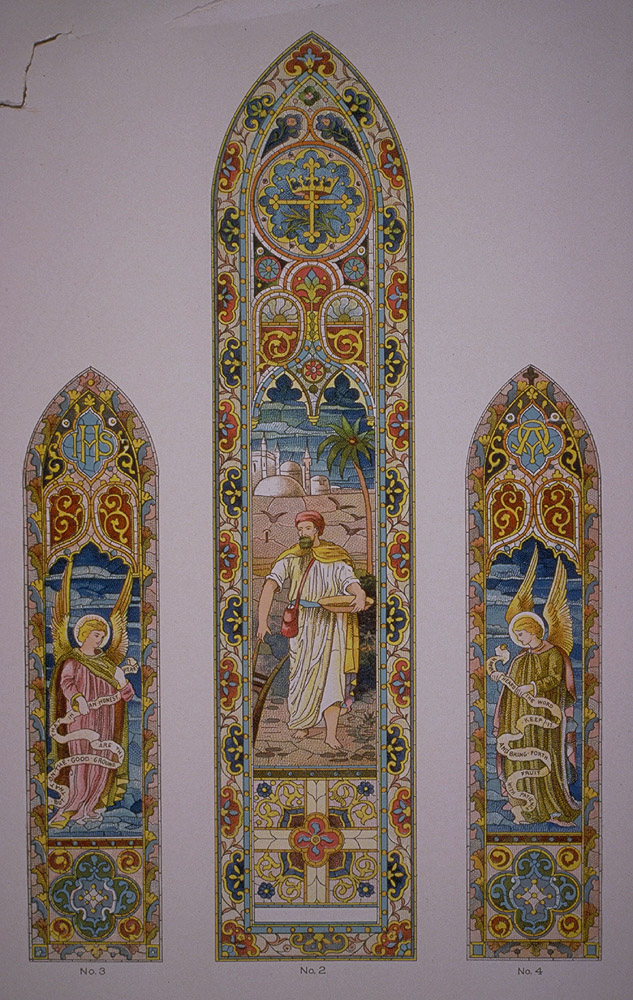
Plate from the Alfred Godwin & Co. Catalogue, c. 1891

Alfred Godwin & Company designed the stained-and-leaded glass for The Bellevue-Stratford Hotel, at 200 South Broad Street, in Philadelphia. This was the grandest hotel in the city, and hotelier George Boldt's brain-child and masterpiece. Many of Godwin windows were removed and sold during renovations in the 1940s and 1950s. Twelve of his original transoms survive along the building's Broad Street facade. Several of his sky-lights and one Venetian window also are extant. The second Venetian window (of a nymph dancing), which graced the former North/Main Staircase, disappeared during renovations in the 1980s. One of his sky-lights is located north of the lobby, in the Starbucks Coffee Shop on the Walnut Street side.

Godwin designed much of the stained-and-leaded glass for the Pennsylvania State Capitol in Harrisburg, Pennsylvania.

Godwin published at least three illustrated catalogues: Stained Glass, Alfred Godwin & Co., 1201 Market Street, Phila (c.1883-85); "Catalogue of Stained Glass - Alfred Godwin Designer and Manufacturer of Stained Glass" (1890); and Examples of Stained Glass Windows for Ecclesiastical and Domestic Purposes Recently Executed by Alfred Godwin (1895)

== Death and legacy ==
Godwin died July 19, 1934, and was interred at West Laurel Hill Cemetery in Bala Cynwyd, Pennsylvania.

The Athenaeum of Philadelphia holds a collection of Godwin's sketches.

== Selected works ==
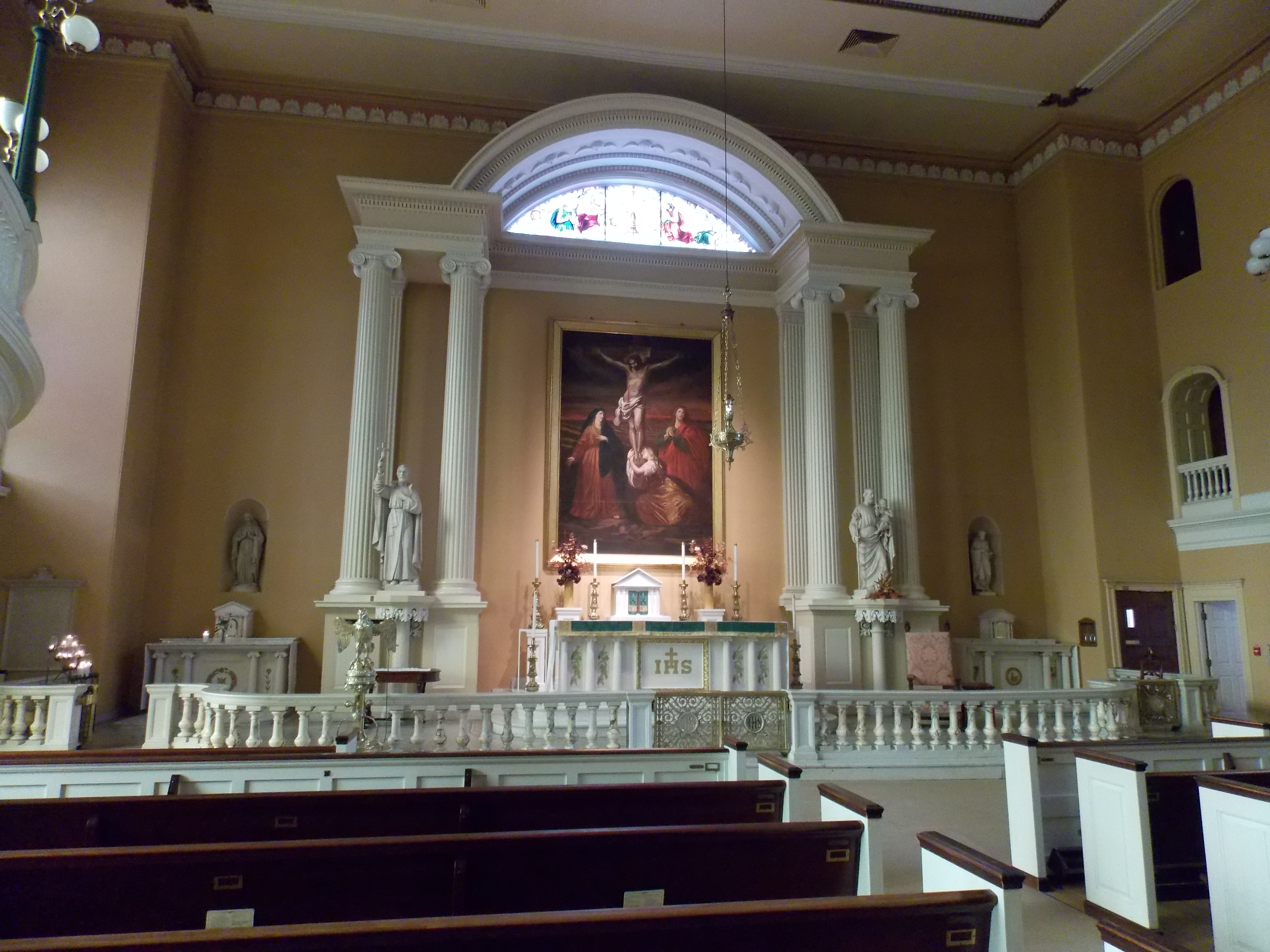
Lunette window over altar (1886), Old St. Joseph's Church, Philadelphia, Pennsylvania

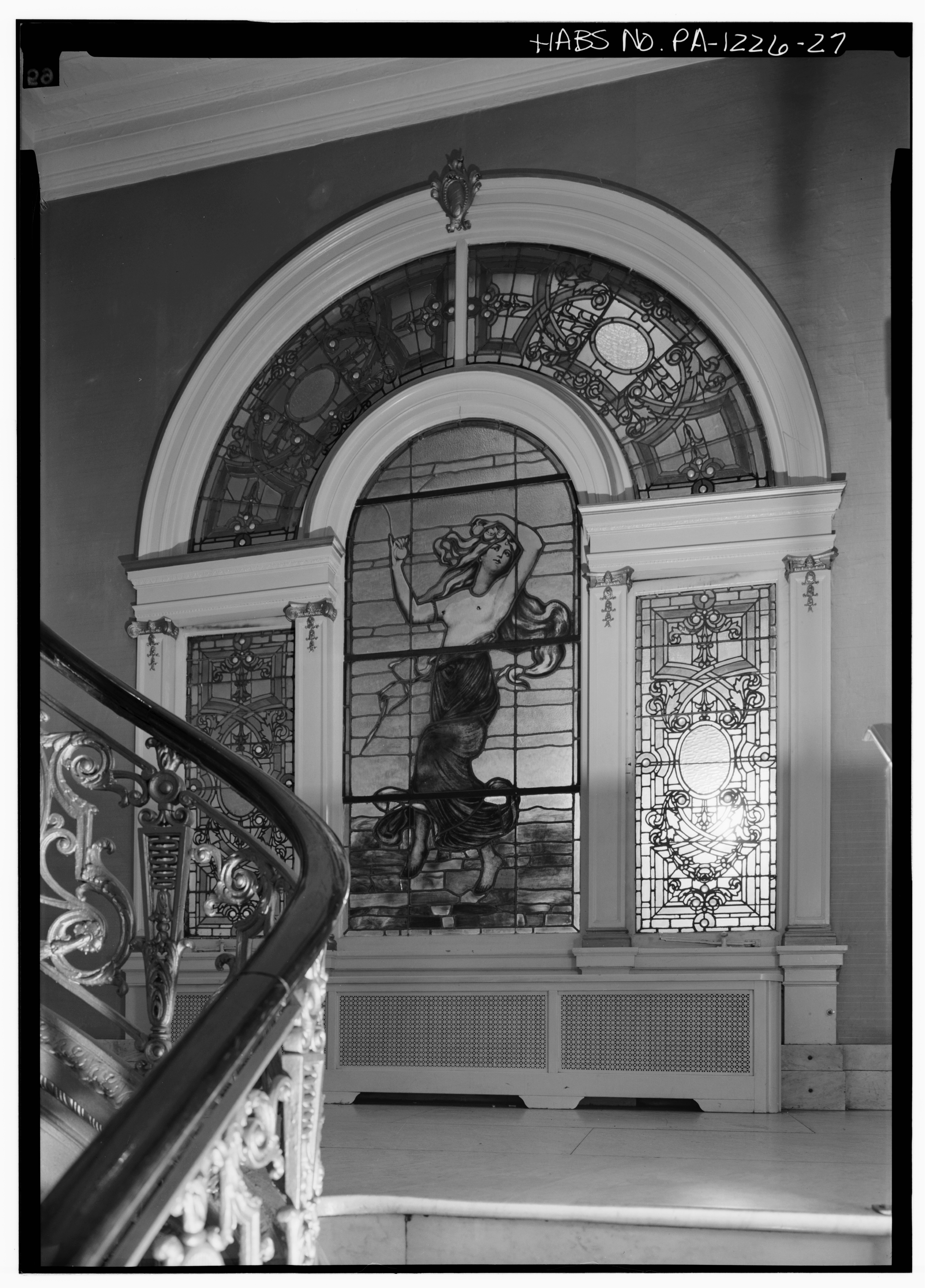
Venetian Window (1904), The Bellevue-Stratford Hotel, Philadelphia

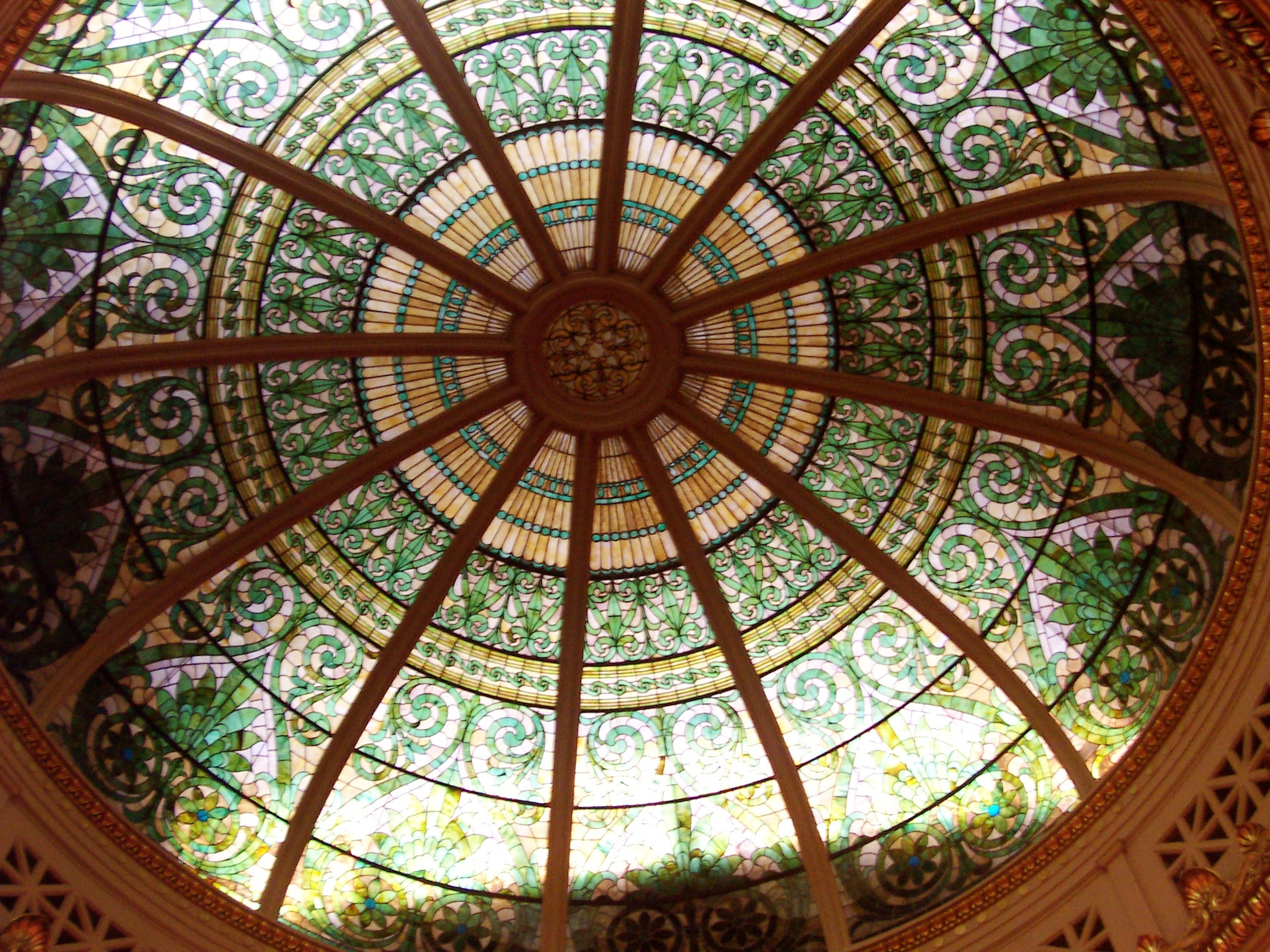
Supreme Court Chamber dome (1906), Pennsylvania State Capitol, Harrisburg

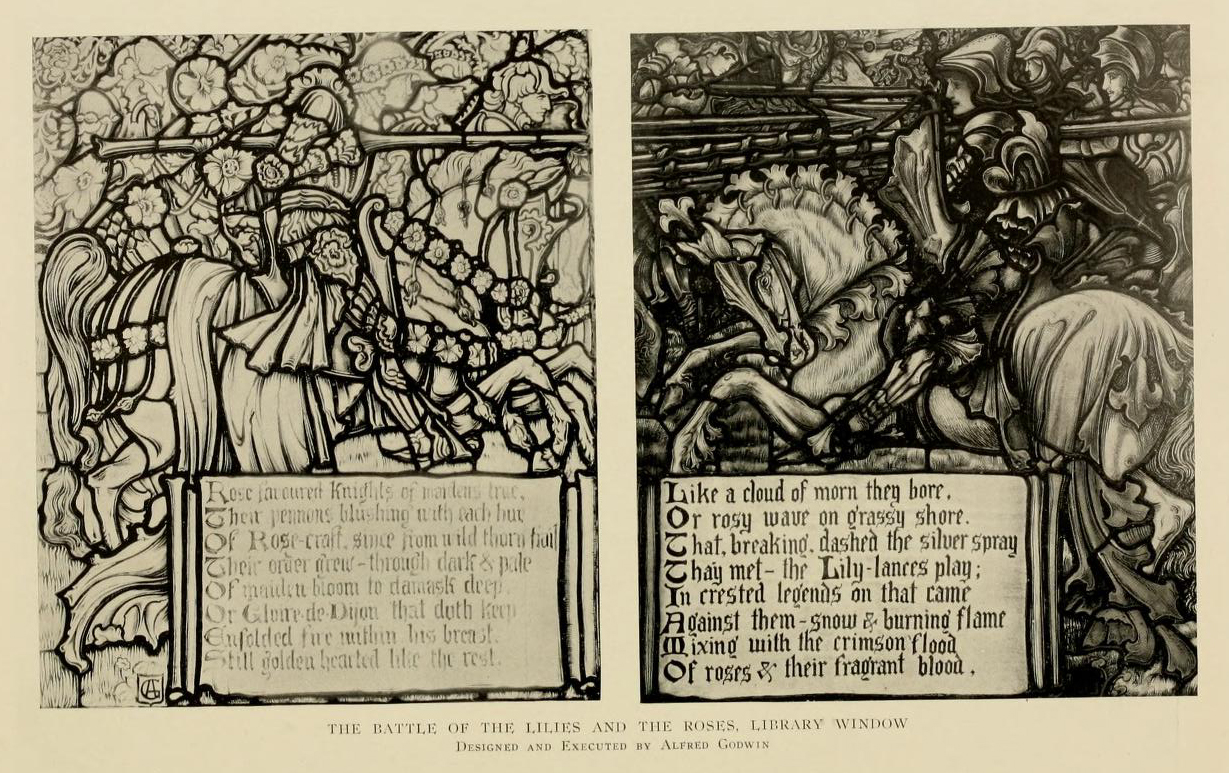
The Battle of the Lilies and the Roses (1910), Fairacres, Jenkintown, Pennsylvania

- 18 windows, "Clayton" (Henry Clay Frick residence), Homewood, Pittsburgh, Pennsylvania
  - Love in the Tower Window (1883), now in Frick Art Museum
  - Harvest Window (1883)
  - Library Window (added 1892)
- Angels Adoring the Eucharist (1886), lunette window over altar, Old St. Joseph's Church, Philadelphia, Pennsylvania
- President Ulysses S. Grant Window (1886), Asbury Park Public Library, Asbury Park, New Jersey. Gift of George W. Childs.
- Holy Infancy Roman Catholic Church (1886), Bethlehem, Pennsylvania
- Market Square Presbyterian Church, Germantown, Philadelphia, Pennsylvania
  - The Sower, Toland Memorial Window, (1888)
  - Emily Jones Memorial Window (1888)
  - Amelia Jones Memorial Window (1888)
  - Fanshawe Memorial Window (1888)
  - Botton Memorial Window (1888)
  - 17 additional windows attributed to Godwin
- 24 windows (1889), Mahoning Presbyterian Church, Danville, Pennsylvania
- Beaver Memorial United Methodist Church, Lewisburg, Pennsylvania
  - Angel at the Tomb, Beaver Memorial Window (1890)
  - Christ and the Woman of Samaria, Wolfe Memorial Window (1890)
  - Christ at Bethany, Slifer Memorial Window (1890)
  - The Good Shepherd, Buckingham Memorial Window (1890)
  - 9 additional windows attributed to Godwin
- Trinity Lutheran Church, Norristown, Pennsylvania
  - Christ Teaching in the Temple (1895)
  - Recording Angel, Fisher Memorial Window (1895)
  - Virgin Mary, Longaker Memorial Window (1895)
  - The Good Shepherd, Baer Memorial Window (1895)
  - Christ and Mary Magdalene, March Memorial Window (1895)
  - Christ with the Children (1895)
  - Angel of the Resurrection (1895)
  - Martin Luther, Lehman Memorial Window (1895)
  - The Ascension (1895)
  - Madonna and Child, Geiger Memorial Window (1895)
  - A Comrade of the Cross, Stalher Memorial Window (c. 1914)
  - 5 additional windows attributed to Godwin
- Bellevue-Stratford Hotel, Philadelphia, Pennsylvania
  - 12 transoms over first-floor Broad Street windows (1904)
  - 2 Venetian windows (1904), one stolen in the 1980s
  - Skylights
- All Saints' Episcopal Church, Norristown, Pennsylvania
  - Angels Playing Musical Instruments, Bolton/Adle Memorial Window (1905)
  - St. Matthew and St. Mark, Stroud Memorial Window (1905)
  - St. Luke and St. John, Stroud Memorial Window (1905)
  - Te Deum, Swift Window (1905)
  - The Annunciation, Burk Window (1908)
- Pennsylvania State Capitol, Harrisburg, Pennsylvania
  - Supreme Court Chamber dome (1906)
  - Clerestory windows, Rotunda dome (1906, attributed)
  - Light Court skylights (1906, attributed)
  - Glass ceiling, Senate Chamber (1906, attributed)
  - Glass ceiling, House of Representatives Chamber (1906, attributed)
- 6 windows (1906), Memorial Chapel of the Resurrection, Mauch Chunk Cemetery, Jim Thorpe, Pennsylvania
- 5 windows (1908–11), St. Paul's Lutheran Church, Ardmore, Pennsylvania
- The Battle of the Lilies and the Roses (1910), "Fairacres" (John W. Pepper residence), Jenkintown, Pennsylvania
- Christ Resurrected, Fitler Memorial Window (1910), 5-panels above the altar, Episcopal Church of Christ, Riverton, New Jersey
- St. Luke and the Epiphany Episcopal Church, Philadelphia, Pennsylvania
  - St. John, Brice Memorial Window (1912)
  - St. James, Lennon Memorial Window (1912)
  - St. Andrew, Lloyd Memorial Window (1912)
  - St. Peter, Belfield Memorial Window (1912)
  - St. Thomas, Paul Memorial Window (1912)
  - St. Matthew, Memorial Window (1912)
  - St. Bartholomew, Pepper Memorial Window (1912)
  - St. Thaddeus, Pepper Memorial Window (1912)
  - St. Simon, Clarkson Memorial Window (1912)
  - St. Philip, Van Bell Memorial Window (1912)
- Neil Memorial Window (1916), Lady Chapel, St. Clement's Episcopal Church, Philadelphia, Pennsylvania
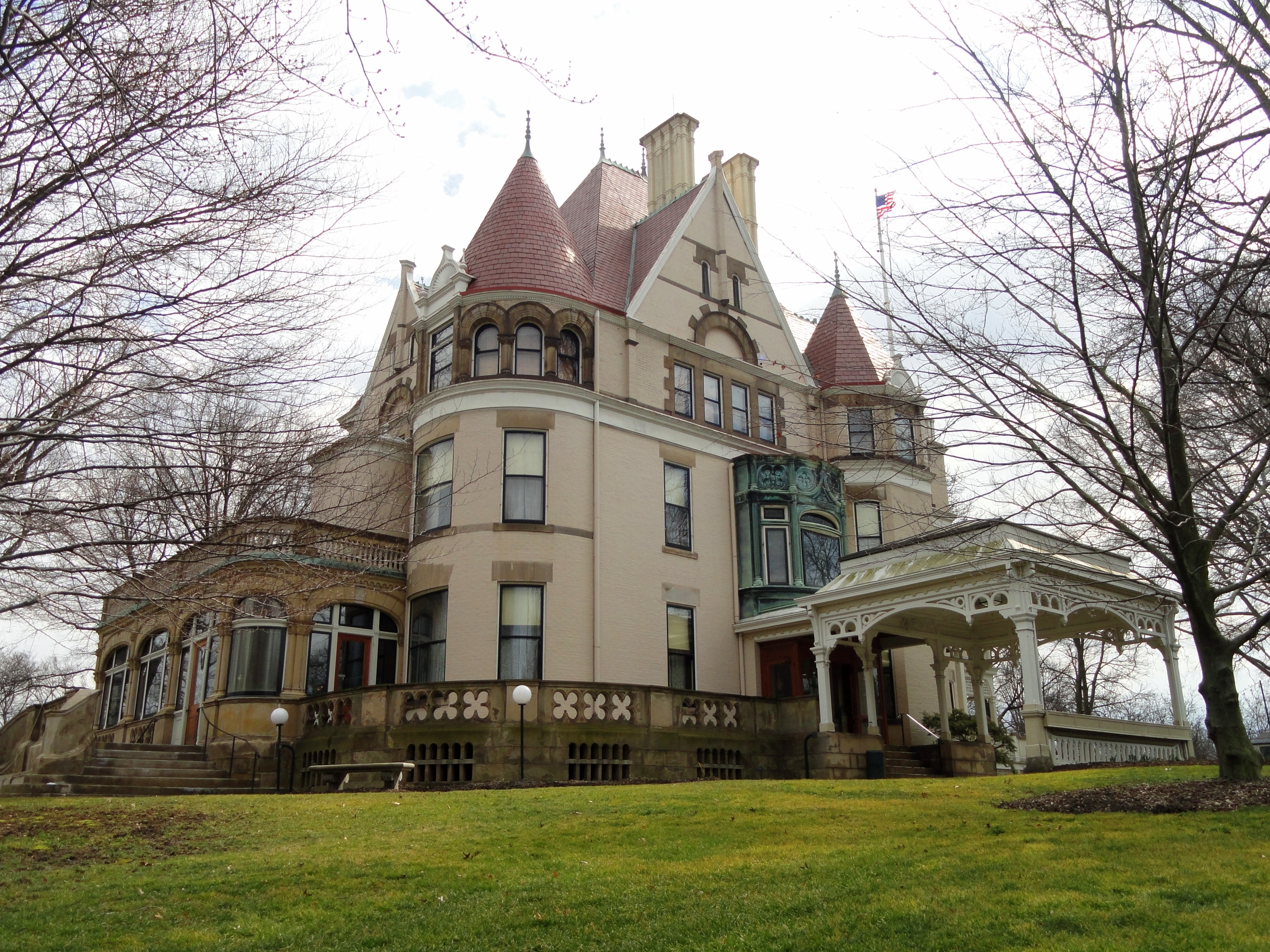
"Clayton," Pittsburgh, Pennsylvania

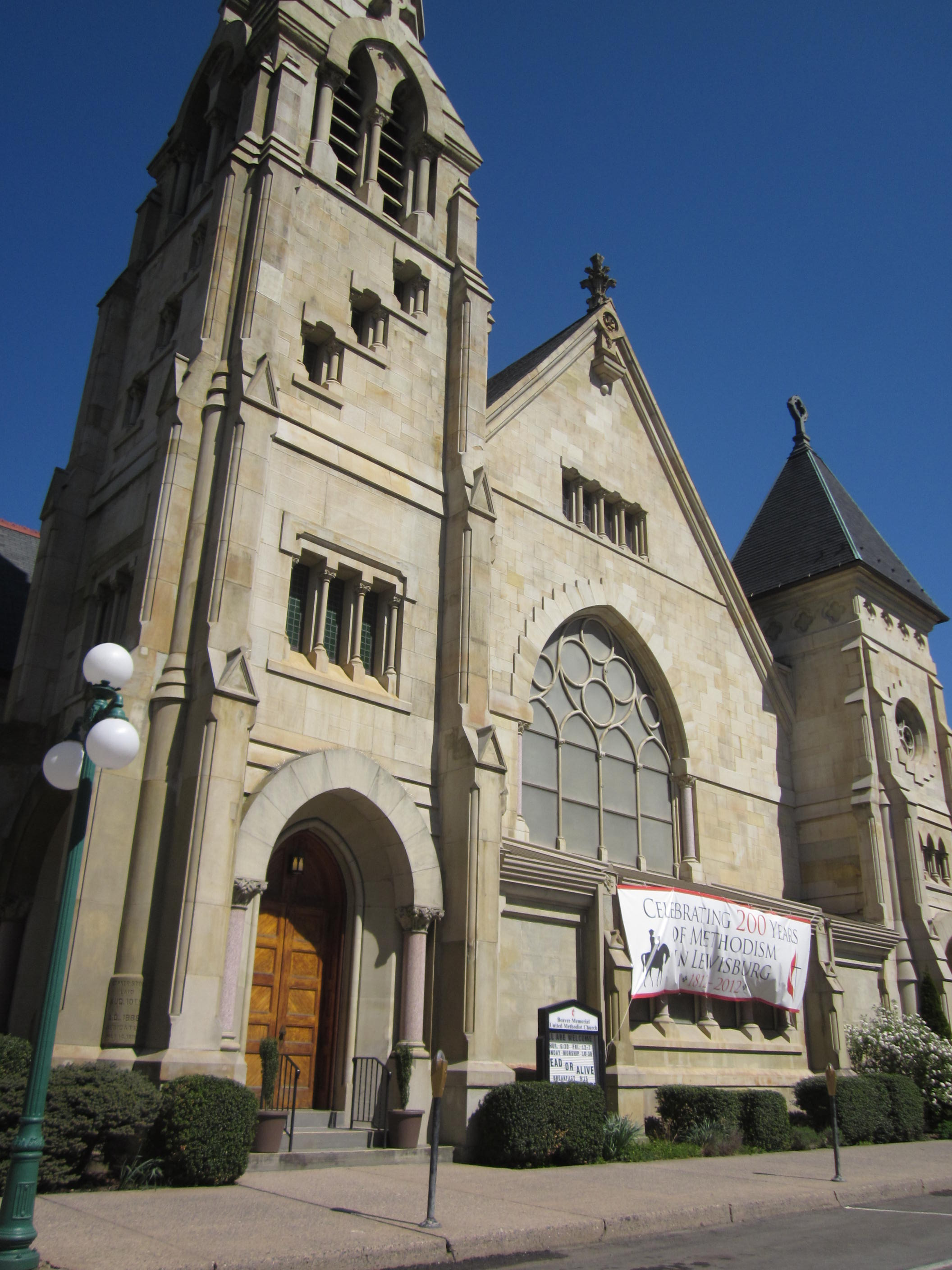
Beaver Memorial United Methodist Church, Lewisburg, Pennsylvania

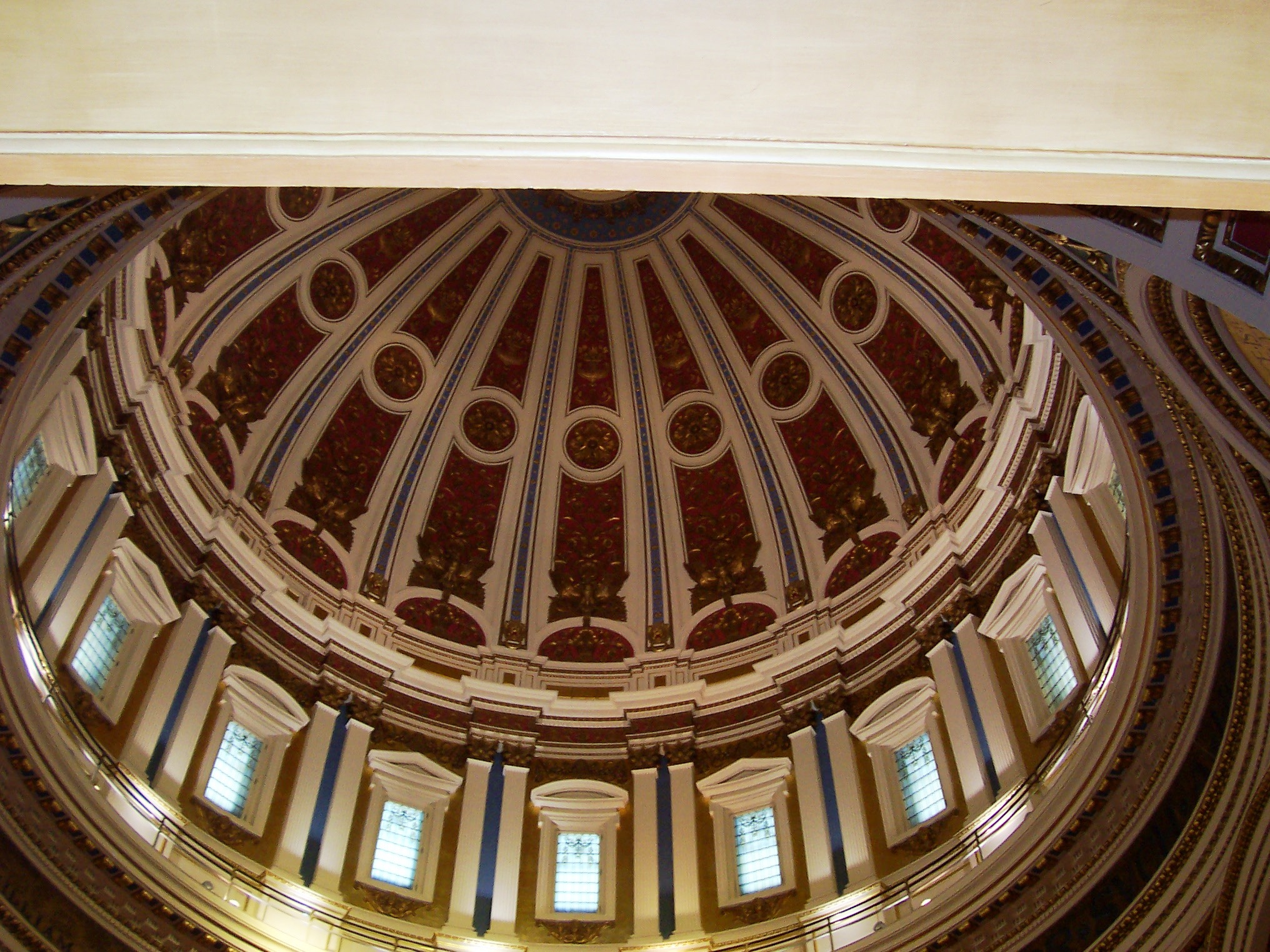
Clerestory windows, Rotunda dome, Pennsylvania State Capitol, Harrisburg
