= Wooster Street (Manhattan) =

Street in Manhattan, New York

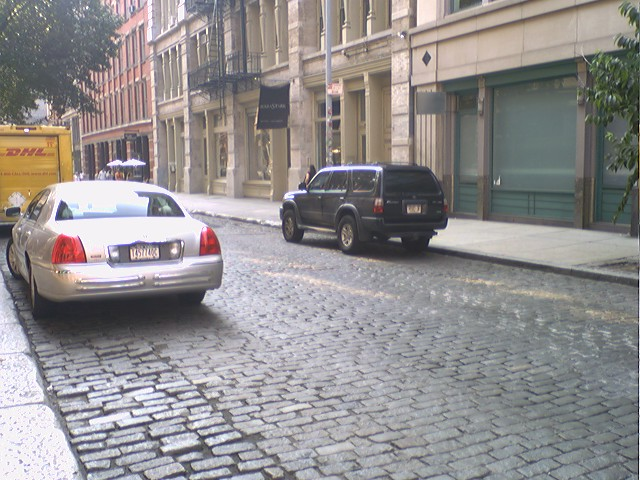
Wooster Street in SoHo

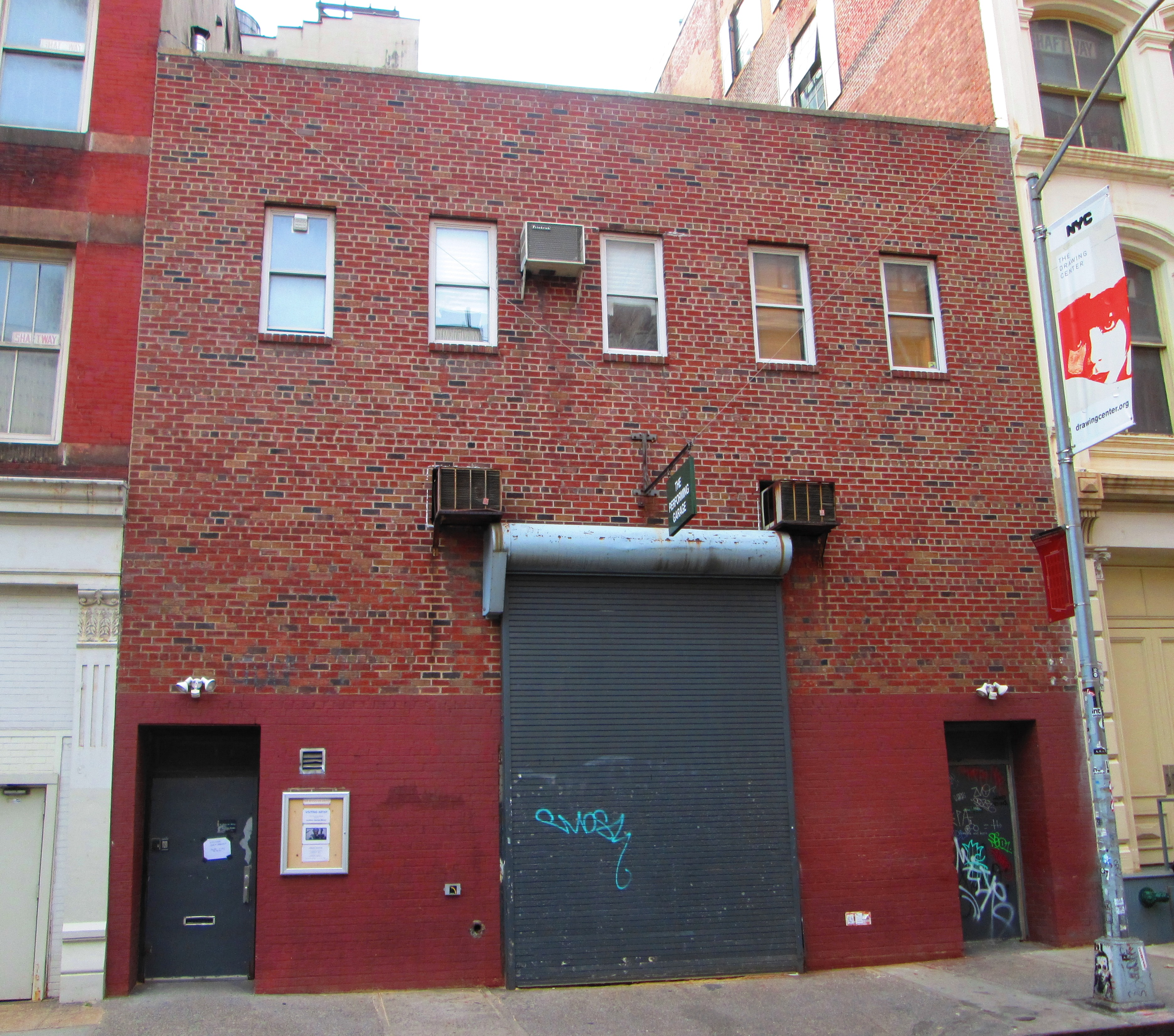
The Performing Garage in 2014

Wooster Street is a street in SoHo and Greenwich Village in Manhattan, which runs south to north from Canal Street to Washington Square. It is a prime location for on-location filming and photo shoots due to its relatively low traffic, and the flagstone sidewalks and cobblestone street give it an old gritty feel. It is depicted as a night-time rainy street on the cover of the issue of The New Yorker dated February 8, 2021.

== History ==
The street is named after an American Revolutionary War general, David Wooster. Duparquet, Huot & Moneuse held Nos. 24 and 26 early in the company's history.

The street is home to many boutiques, restaurants and cultural institutions such as The Wooster Group, an experimental theater company based at the Performing Garage at 33 Wooster Street.

== Notable residents ==
- Claire Danes and Hugh Dancy
- Whoopi Goldberg
- Billy Corgan
