= Duparquet, Huot & Moneuse =

Defunct American Kitchen Manufacturer

- Industry: Manufacturing
- Founded: 1852; 173 years ago
- Defunct: 1936
- Fate: Bankrupted
- Products: Stoves; Pans; Utensils

Duparquet, Huot & Moneuse, Co. was a kitchen equipment manufacturer that was founded in 1852. Early in its existence, its address was 43 & 45 Wooster Street in New York City. It had a factory in SoHo, and it had sales offices in Boston, Chicago, and the U.S. capital. The company specialized in commercial stoves, which were sold to passenger ships, hospitals and prisons, but it also sold paraphernalia such as knives, pans, sieves and all kinds of kitchen utensils. In 1905, following a workers' strike at its New York factory, the company lowered the workweek to 50 hours. By 1907, it proclaimed itself a manufacturer of "Imperial French Ranges and High Grade Cooking Apparatus", as well as a general kitchen outfitter.

Duparquet made a stove for Delmonico's; the kitchen of the Otesaga was furnished by Duparquet, as was that of The Bellevue-Stratford Hotel.

Among private owners, Jay Gould's mansion had a Duparquet from the 1880s, and Woodrow Wilson's retirement home had a coal-fired one which was used by the servants. Frederick William Vanderbilt bought a Duparquet range with a cooking surface measuring 9' x 3'4" for $400 in 1898 for his country house in Hyde Park, as did R. J. Reynolds for the house in Winston-Salem he built in 1917.

As late as 1933–1934, Duparquet provided maintenance and remodelation to the kitchen and lunchroom of the Frick. The company went bankrupt in 1936; a new concern re-registered the trademark in 2008.

== See also ==
- DUPARQUET HUOT MONEUSE COMPANY v. EVANS, a 1936 Supreme Court case involving the company.
