= Garrett Memorial Chapel =

Historic church in New York, United States

- U.S. National Register of Historic Places
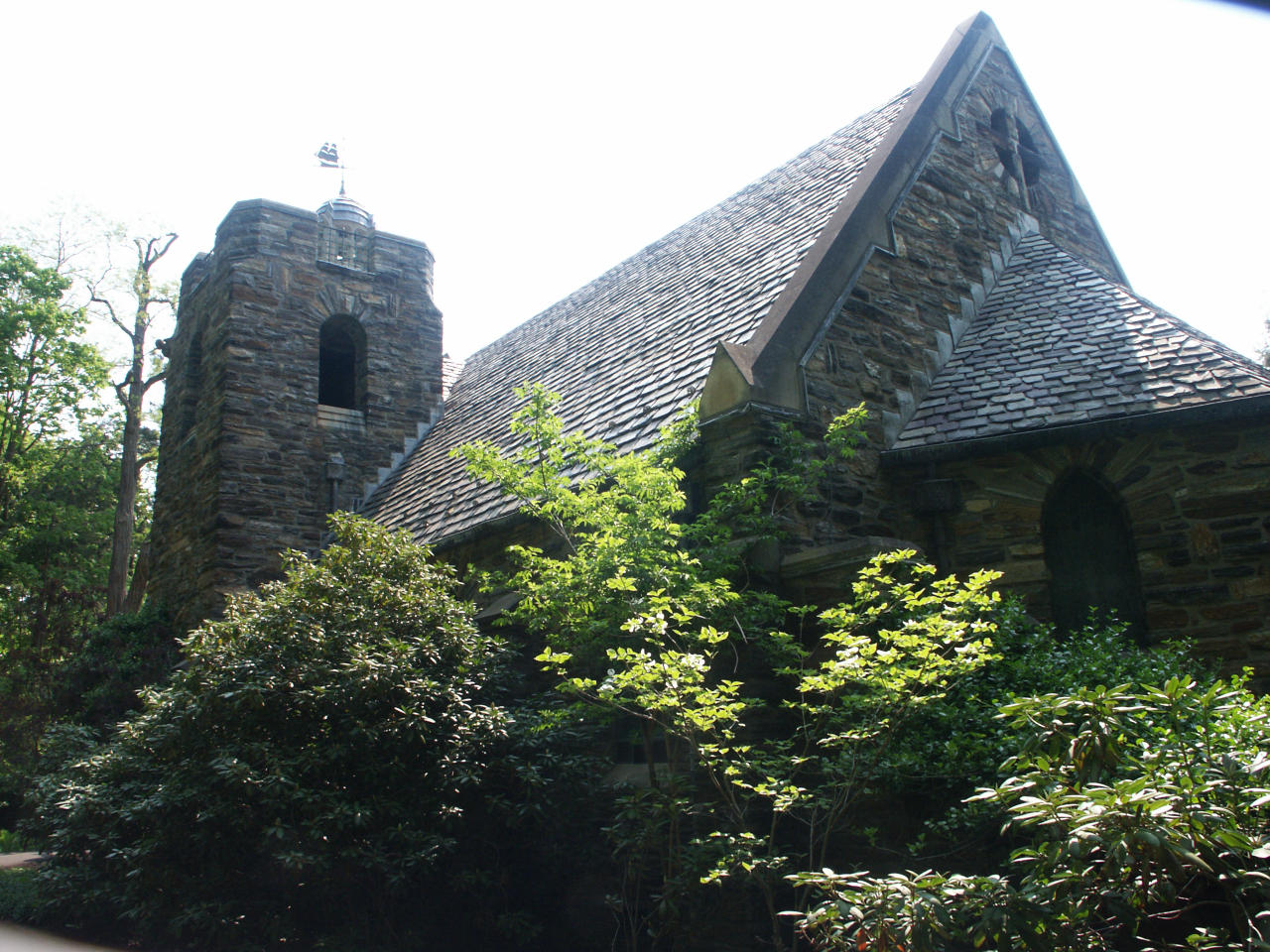
- Garrett Chapel as viewed from the rear

- Location within New York Location within the United States
- Location: Skyline Dr., Bluff Point, New York
- Coordinates: 42°30′27″N 77°7′54″W
- Area: 4.7 acres (1.9 ha)
- Built: 1930-1931
- Architect: Freehof, Mortimer
- Architectural style: Late Gothic Revival
- NRHP reference No.: 01000296
- Added to NRHP: March 30, 2001

Garrett Memorial Chapel is a small Church in the Norman Gothic Style located on Bluff Point at Lake Keuka, in the town of Jerusalem, in Yates County, New York. On 30 March 2001 the Chapel was added to the National Register of Historic Places.

The Chapel was built in 1930-1931 by the Garrett family of whom Paul Garrett was a major figure in the American wine industry as a memorial to his son Charles who had died of tuberculosis in January 1930. The rectangular plan building is constructed of ashlar granite with cast stone decorative elements. It features a polygonal apse, round arched openings, and a large square corner tower topped by a lantern and weathervane. On the lower level is the church crypt. Also on the property is a contributing concrete block lavatory. Many of the stained glass windows in the chapel and the crypt were designed by Frederick Wilson.

The Chapel is normally open from April to November and is serviced by a seasonal access road. The Chapel is non-denominational but is under the stewardship of the Episcopal Diocese of Rochester. It is a popular venue for weddings due to its architecture and scenic views of Keuka Lake and the surrounding area.
