= Frederick Wilson (artist) =

British stained glass artist (1858–1932)

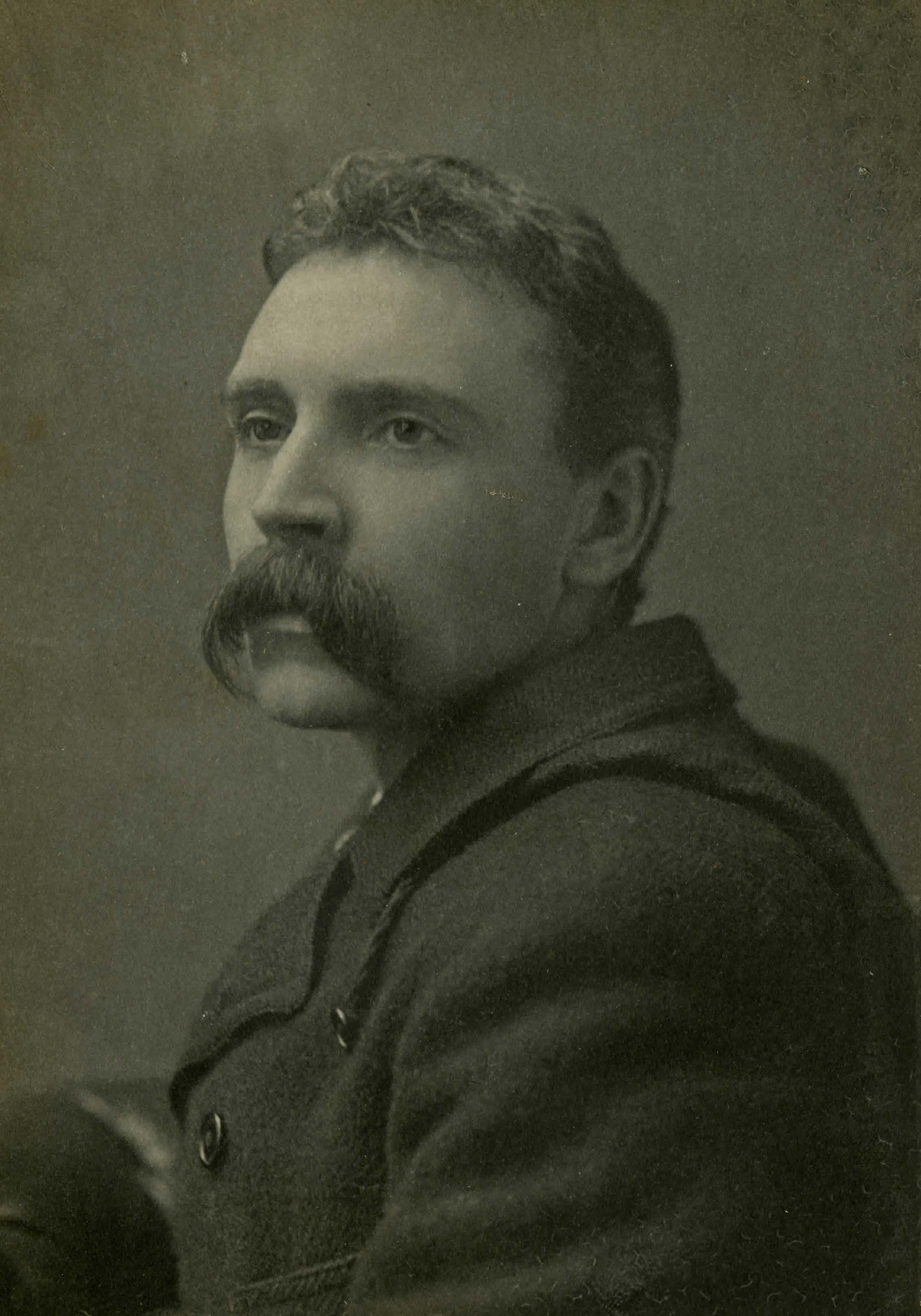
- Frederick Wilson circa 1891
- Born: November 3, 1858; Dublin, Ireland
- Died: March 24, 1932 (aged 74); Los Angeles, United States
- Known for: stained glass, mosaic
- Spouse: Mary Gwladys Morgan (1891–1932; his death)

Frederick Wilson (3 November 1858 - 24 March 1932) was a British stained glass artist best known for his work with the American Art Nouveau glass manufacturer Tiffany Studios in New York. He was a prominent and prolific designer of ecclesiastical windows in the United States during the late 19th and early 20th centuries, designing more than 500 windows in his three decades with Tiffany Studios.

== Biography ==
Frederick Wilson was born in Dublin, Ireland to English parents, Charles and Elizabeth Wilson. The family eventually moved to England and Wilson and his six siblings were raised in both Liverpool and London. Although little is known about Wilson's early artistic education, there is evidence that he attended the South Kensington School, which was associated with the South Kensington Museum (now known as the Victoria and Albert Museum).

In 1891, Wilson married Mary Gladys Morgan, and the following year they immigrated to the United States. The couple had three children: Gladys, Sylvia and Beatrice.

== Career ==
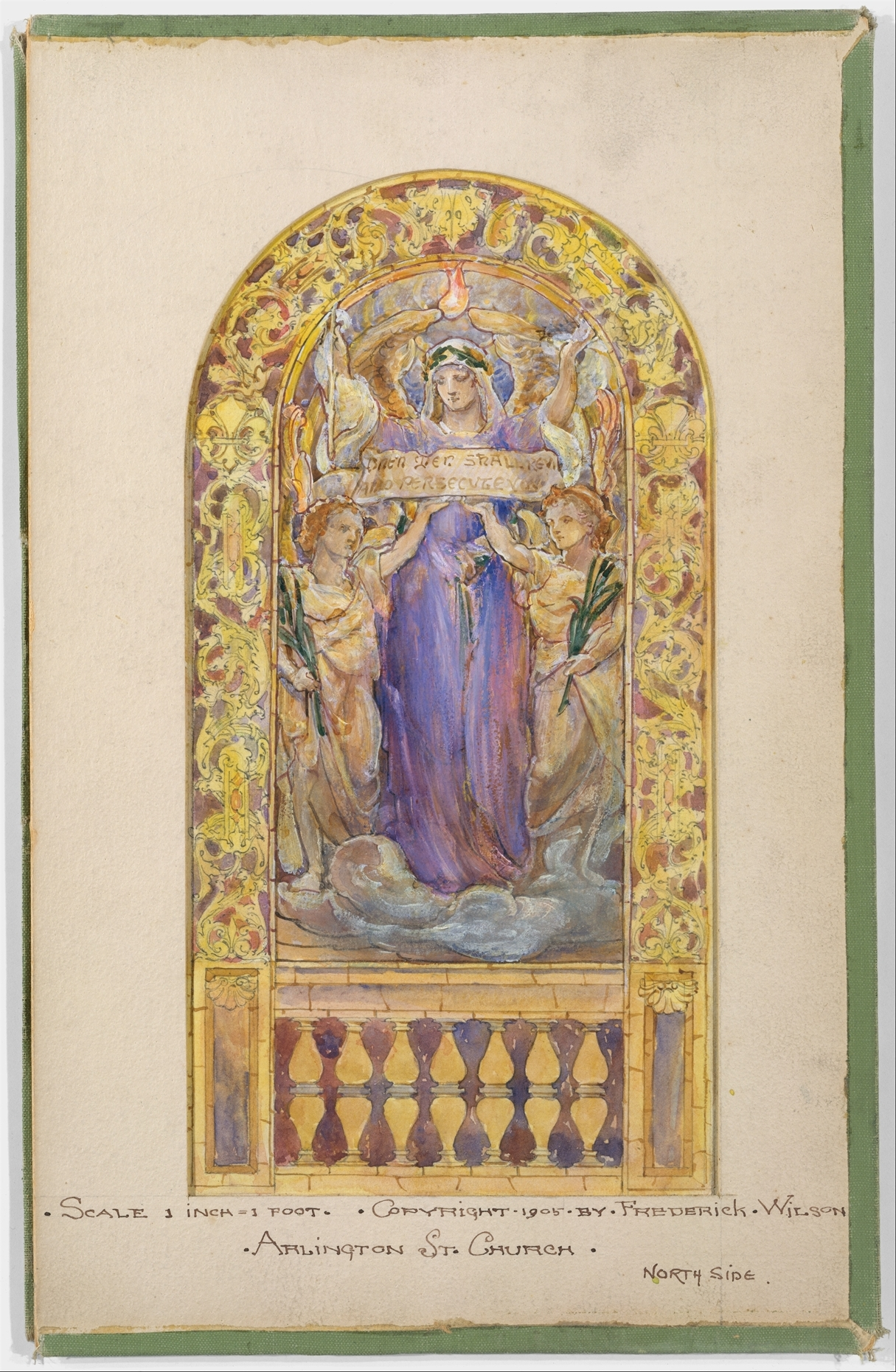
Design for beatitude window for Arlington Street Church, Boston, Massachusetts

Frederick Wilson's career designing stained glass spanned more than 50 years. He was "known and accepted as an important artist in his field" during his lifetime, and his work had a major impact on how American ecclesiastical stained glass looked around the turn of the 20th century.

Perhaps best known for his work at Tiffany Studios, Wilson also designed windows for at least five other firms, including: Heaton, Butler and Bayne, London, England; Alfred Godwin and Company, Philadelphia, Pennsylvania; Gorham Manufacturing Company, Providence, Rhode Island; The Los Angeles Art Glass Company, Los Angeles, California; and Judson Studios, also in Los Angeles.

Over the course of his career, Wilson was a member of several professional arts groups, including the Art Club of Philadelphia, the Pennsylvania Academy of the Fine Arts, the American Federation of Arts, and the Architectural League of New York.

Wilson likely began his artistic career in England in the 1870s. He was heavily influenced by the work of the Pre-Raphaelites, and incorporated ecclesiastical subjects in his designs from a young age.

In 1892, Wilson and his wife Mary emigrated to the United States. He soon found employment at Alfred Godwin and Company in Philadelphia. However, there are no known Wilson designs executed by the company, and by 1893 he began working for Tiffany Studios.

=== Tiffany Studios and later career ===
Wilson was among the most prominent and prolific designers at Tiffany Studios, and was the first in-house designer in the Ecclesiastical Department. He likely joined the firm sometime in 1893, and that same year exhibited one of his designs using Tiffany's name at the World's Columbian Exposition in Chicago, Illinois. Wilson was awarded a gold medal for work under his own name at the Exposition Universelle in Paris, France in 1900.

In 1897, Wilson became Tiffany Studio's chief window designer. Two years later, in 1899, he was appointed the head of the Ecclesiastical Department. During this time he maintained his own studio in Briarcliff Manor, New York, and would often work there instead of at the Tiffany Studios factory in Corona, Queens.

After 30 years and more than 500 windows designed and executed, Wilson left Tiffany Studios in 1923. He moved to Los Angeles to work for Judson Studios. There, he received commissions for his work across the state, including a commission from the Judson family themselves on the death of William Lees Judson, the founder of the College of Fine Arts of the University of Southern California and the father of Judson Studios founder, Walter Judson.

Wilson's final commission was for a series of windows to be installed in Garrett Memorial Chapel in Jerusalem, New York. He completed the designs for the windows in 1931, but did not live to see their installation in 1932.

Wilson died in March 1932 in Los Angeles.

== Selected works ==
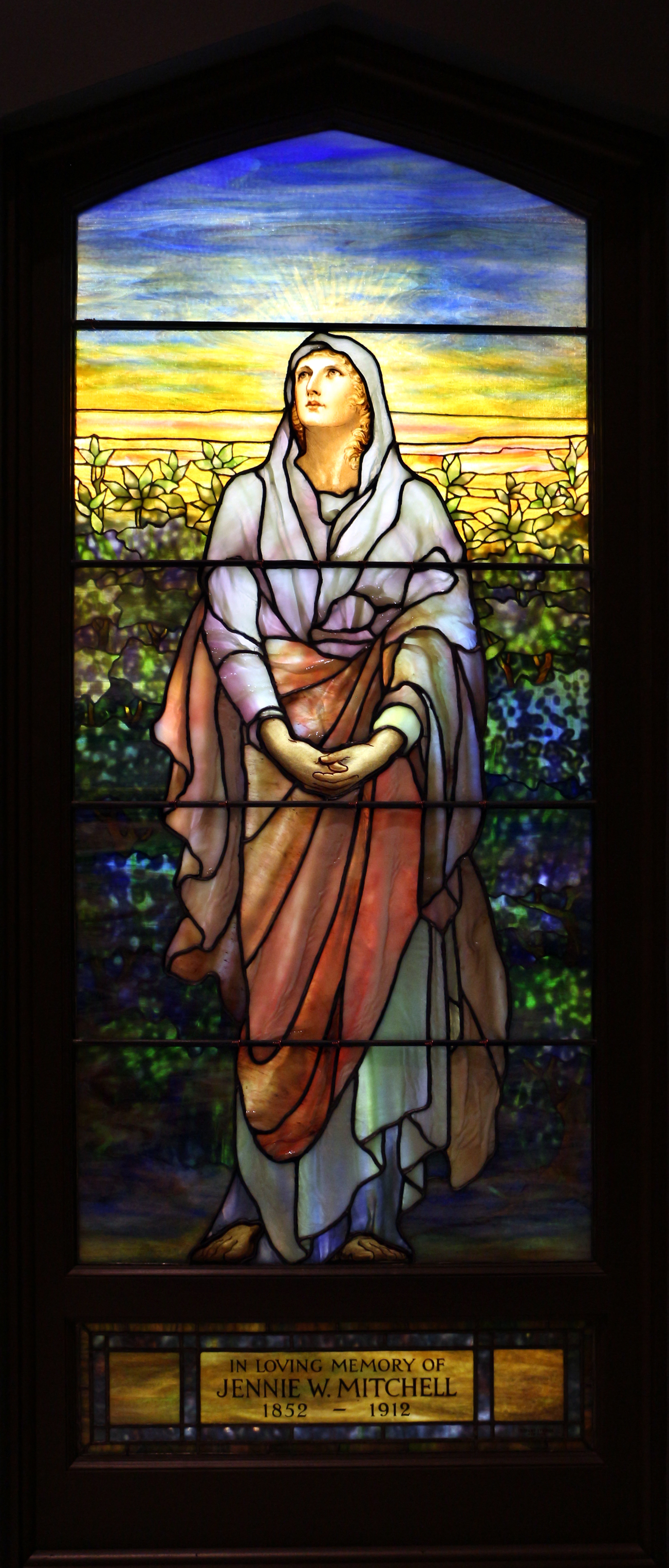
Jennie W. Mitchell Memorial Window, designed by Frederick Wilson for Tiffany Studios, circa 1900.

- Windows in the Naval Academy Chapel (1899-1920), Annapolis, Maryland. Wilson designed a number of memorial windows for the chapel, including The Mason Window (1899), the Porter Window (1908), the Sampson Window (1909), and the Farragut Window (1920).
- The Righteous Shall Receive a Crown of Glory (1901), originally installed in the United Methodist Church in Waterville, New York. This window was commissioned by Ira and Mary Brainard in memory of Charles Green. It is now in the collection of the Corning Museum of Glass.
- Angel of the Resurrection (1904), originally installed in First Presbyterian Church, Indianapolis, Indiana. The windows were removed and donated in 1972 to the Indianapolis Museum of Art, where they remain on permanent exhibition.
- The Te Deum (1906), originally installed in First Presbyterian Church, Syracuse, New York. The windows were likely removed around 2008 when the church was purchased by a Tiffany dealer.
- Good Shepherd and Landscape (1909), originally installed the Stony Wold Sanatorium chapel in Lake Kushaqua, New York. The window was donated by Mrs. Walter Geer to Stony Wold in memory of her sister, Miss Martha Potter. It is now divided between the collections of the New-York Historical Society and the Neustadt.
- The Prayer of the Christian Soldier (1919), installed in First Presbyterian Church (now United Presbyterian Church) in Binghamton, New York.
- Anselm and Wycliff, (1920s) Saint John's Chapel at the Episcopal Divinity School, Cambridge, Massachusetts.
- Windows in the Garrett Memorial Chapel (1930–31), Jerusalem, New York. These were the last windows designed by Wilson before his death.

== See also ==
- Louis Comfort Tiffany
