= The Bellevue-Stratford Hotel =

Hotel in Philadelphia, Pennsylvania

The Bellevue
- Former names: Bellevue-Stratford Hotel, Fairmont Hotel, The Westin Bellevue-Stratford, Hotel Atop the Bellevue, Park Hyatt Philadelphia at the Bellevue, Hyatt at the Bellevue
- Alternative names: Bellevue-Stratford Hotel

General information
- Location: 200 S. Broad Street, Philadelphia, Pennsylvania, United States Building details
- Hotel chain: Hyatt
- Bellevue Stratford Hotel
- U.S. National Register of Historic Places
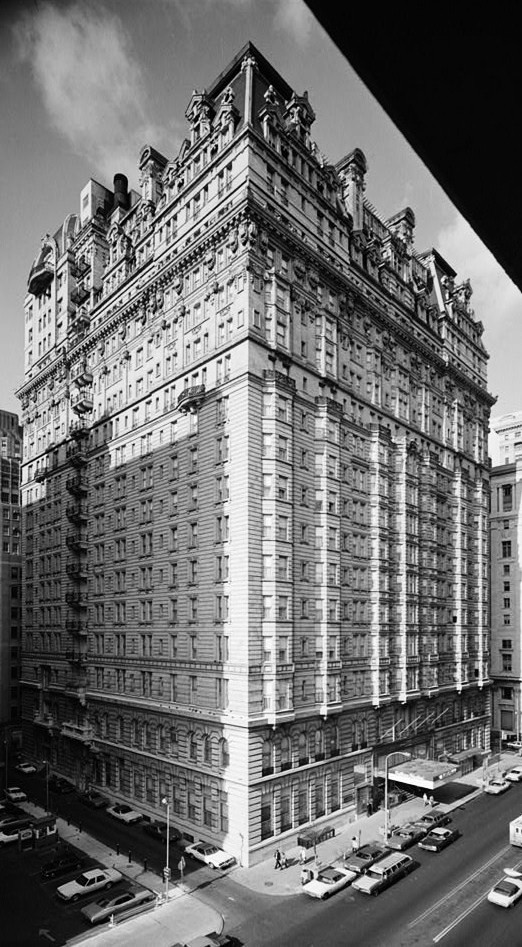
- The Bellevue-Stratford Hotel in 1976

- Location within Philadelphia Location within Pennsylvania Location within the United States
- Coordinates: 39°56′56″N 75°9′55″W
- Built: 1902–04
- Architect: G. W. & W. D. Hewitt; Hewitt & Paist
- Architectural style: French Renaissance
- NRHP reference No.: 77001182
- Added to NRHP: March 24, 1977

The Bellevue-Stratford Hotel is a landmark building at 200 S. Broad Street at the corner of Walnut Street in Center City Philadelphia, Pennsylvania. Constructed in 1904 and expanded to its present size in 1912, it has continued as a well-known institution for more than a century and is still widely known by that original, historic name.

In November 1976, the hotel closed following a lethal outbreak of pneumonia-like illness the previous summer. The outbreak, later traced to bacterial growth in the hotel's air-conditioning system, killed or sickened numerous guests who had attended an American Legion convention. Despite a subsequent change in ownership, renovations, and a brief rebranding before reopening in September 1979, the Bellevue-Stratford never recovered from the disaster, and the original incarnation of the hotel permanently closed in March 1986.

In 1988, the building was converted to a mixed-use development. It has been known since then as The Bellevue. The hotel portion is currently managed by Hyatt as The Bellevue Hotel.

== History ==
=== 19th century ===
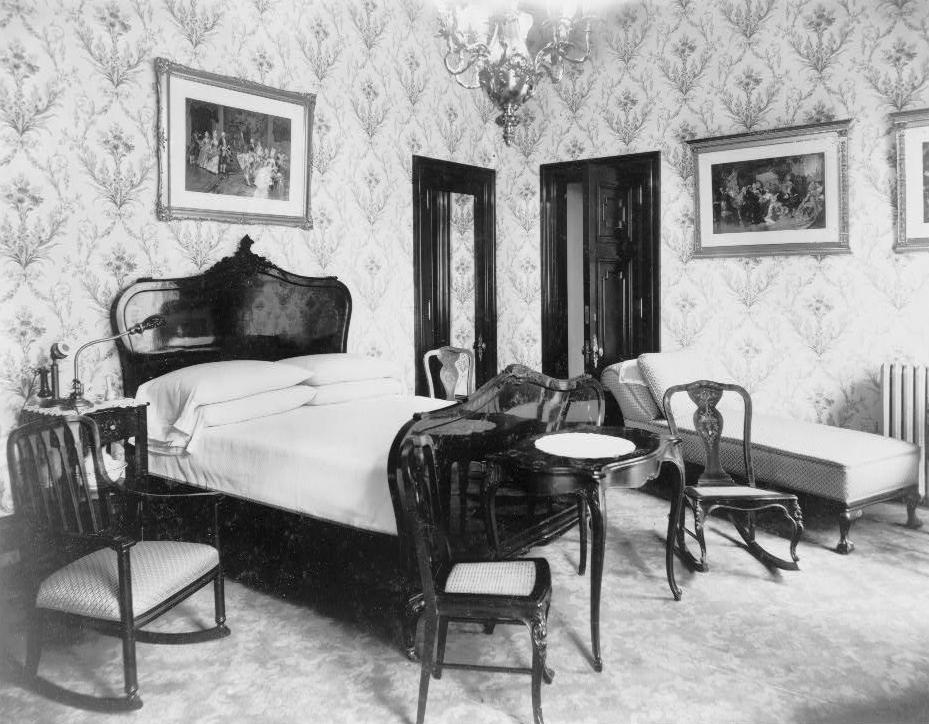
A bedroom in the Bellevue-Stratford, photographed by William H. Rau, c. 1905

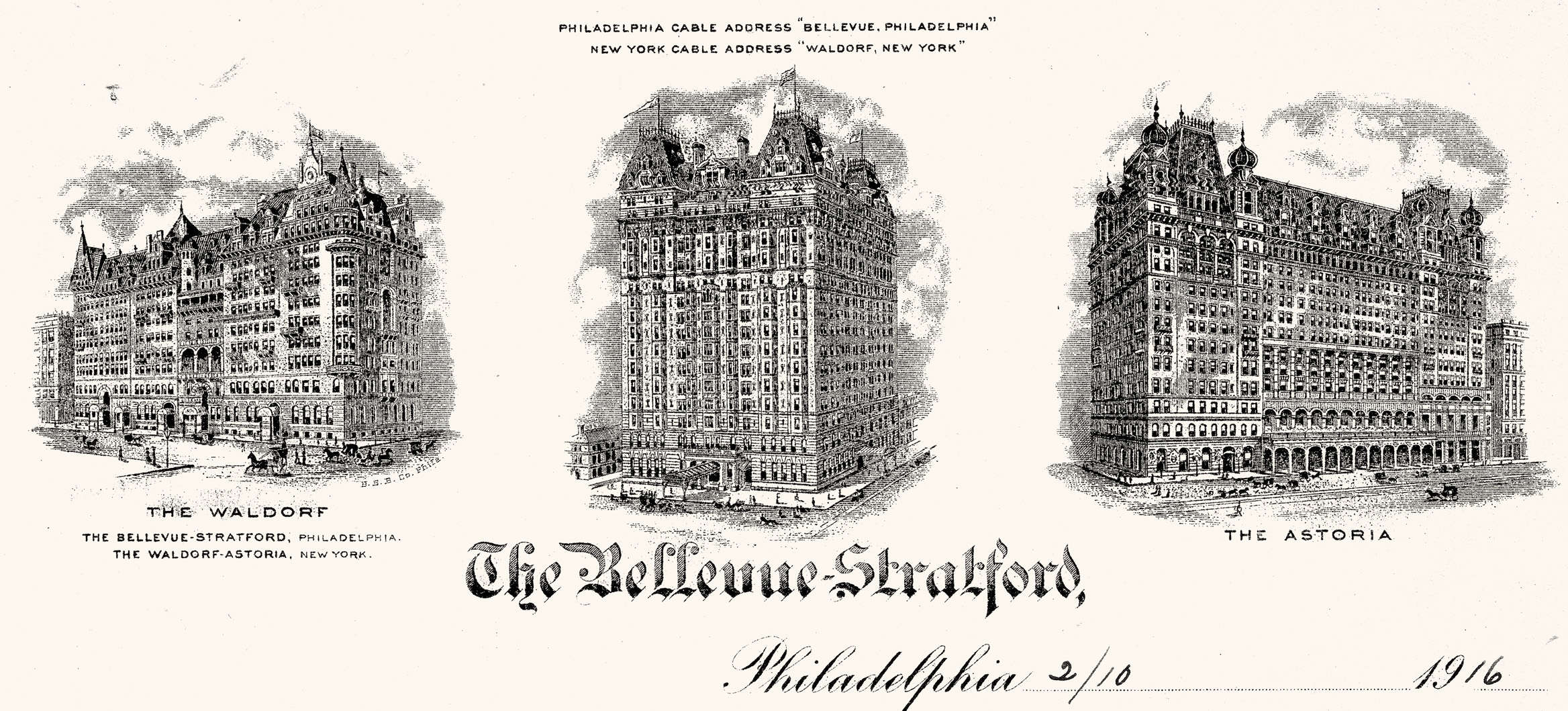
Engraved 1916 letterhead of the Bellevue-Stratford Hotel with vignettes of both the hotel and that of the Waldorf-Astoria Hotel in New York City, both of which were then operating under the management of George Boldt

In 1890, George Boldt, an immigrant from Prussia and kitchen worker at The Philadelphia Club, was invited by William Waldorf Astor to be proprietor of the new Waldorf Hotel in New York City. Boldt was married to the daughter of the Philadelphia Club, Louise Kehrer, who was born in Philadelphia. The following year, in 1891, prominent members of the Philadelphia Club assisted the couple in setting up their own hotel, the Bellevue, at the northwest corner of Broad and Walnut Streets. Initially a small hotel, it quickly became nationally known for its high standard of service, elite clientele, and fine cuisine; it is believed that Chicken à la King was created in the 1890s by hotel cook William "Bill" King.

Louise Boldt was instrumental in making their Philadelphia hotel attractive and socially acceptable to wealthy women. This was probably a major motivation for Astor in asking George Boldt to become proprietor of his new Waldorf, later expanded by John Jacob Astor IV to become the world-class institution known as the Waldorf-Astoria Hotel.

With his success at managing the enormous Waldorf-Astoria, George Boldt decided to build a similarly large and luxurious hotel in his home town. He acquired the Stratford Hotel across Walnut on the southwest corner and commissioned the grand 19-floor Bellevue-Stratford Hotel, designed in the French Renaissance style by G.W. & W.D. Hewitt, with Purdy and Henderson, Engineers. These Philadelphia architects also designed the Boldts' famous landmark residence, Boldt Castle in the Thousand Islands.

=== Architecture and design ===
The Bellevue-Stratford utilized a steel-frame structure and terra cotta cladding, reflecting early 20th-century fireproof construction standards. The 1912 expansion added domed function rooms, including the Rose Ballroom. The interior featured imported marble, wrought iron, and custom lighting fixtures.

=== 20th century ===
In 1904, after two years in the making and costing over $8 million, the Bellevue-Stratford opened. It was described at the time as the most luxurious hotel in the nation and perhaps the most spectacular hotel building in the world. It had hundreds of guest suites in a variety of styles, the most magnificent ballroom in the United States, delicate lighting fixtures designed by Thomas Edison, stained and leaded glass embellishments in the form of transoms and Venetian windows and sky-lights by Alfred Godwin, and the most celebrated marble and hand-worked iron elliptical staircase in the city. The kitchen was furnished by Duparquet, Huot & Moneuse. In 1912, a large extension to the west brought it up to a reputed 1,090 guest rooms, and added the top floor domed function rooms.

The Bellevue-Stratford was a center for Philadelphia's cultural, social and business activities. It functioned for the Philadelphia businessperson as the venue for meetings and social functions. Charity balls, society weddings, club meetings and special family gatherings have all been held in the hotel's ballrooms and meeting rooms. Royalty,international heads of state, presidents, politicians, actors, and writers have stayed within its walls. Fifteen U.S. Presidents, beginning with Theodore Roosevelt and ending with Ronald Reagan, have been guests at the hotel, which is called the "Grand Dame of Broad Street."

Originally the western end of the building was only three stories high. In 1911, Boldt added extensions to the hotel and carried it to the full nineteen stories. It was completed in 1912 at a cost of $850,000.

In June 1919, the Bellevue was leased to T. Coleman du Pont, together with Lucius M. Boomer, president of Boomer-du Pont Properties Corporation. The ground and building were retained by George C. Boldt Jr. The Boldt family was offered $7,500,000 for the hotel by Boomer-du Pont. They refused, as the asking price was $10,000,000. In June 1925, the company backed by duPont, The Bellevue Company purchased the hotel for $6,500,000 from the heirs of George C. Boldt. It was said that $3,000,000 was paid in cash and a mortgage was taken over the property for $3,500,000.

In October 1926, Queen Marie of Romania stayed at the hotel. The Royal Suite of 11 rooms on the seventh floor to be occupied by Queen Marie and her entourage of 19 has a history. Among the world-famous people who have occupied the suite are President Calvin Coolidge, Cardinal Mercier of Belgium, President Woodrow Wilson, Marshal Joseph Joffre, General John J. Pershing, President Warren G. Harding, Sir Esme Howard, Ambassador Jules Jusserand, and Ambassador Auckland Geddes.

During the 1920s through the 1940s, the noted global host Claude H. Bennett managed the now 735-room Philadelphia hotel. His son, Robert C. Bennett (Cornell Hotel School 1940), and grandson, Robert Jr. (Drexel Hill, PA), Professor of Hotel Management at a suburban Philadelphia community college (Delaware County Community College), were both on the senior management staff of the "Grand Dame" of Broad Street as late as the 1970s prior to the temporary hotel closing.

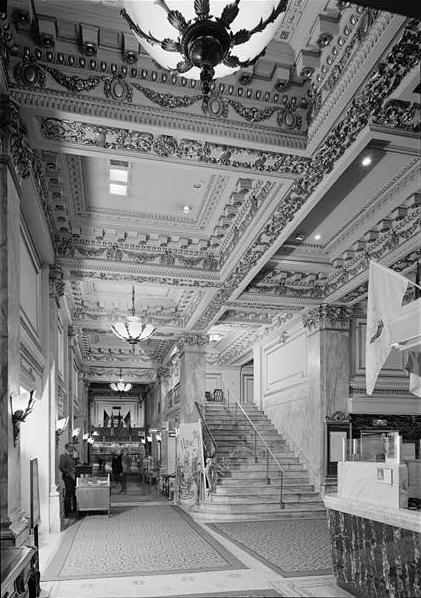
The hotel's lobby in 1976

The Great Depression brought hard times to the Bellevue-Stratford, although it continued to be "Philadelphia's hotel." Gradually, through lack of income and attention, the hotel's glitter began to tarnish. During the 1940s and 1950s, the classic architecture and rich decorative details of the hotel were thought to be overpowering, anachronistic and even offensive.

Noted hotelier Charles Todd managed the hotel after this period, bringing it back "into the black." He had managed the Lake Placid facility for the 1932 Winter Olympics, and later retired from the famed Hotel Hershey in Hershey, Pennsylvania in the 1960s. He is also known for teaching a public domain game called "The Landlord's Game" (teaching economic principles of Georgism espoused by Henry George) in the 1930s to Charles Darrow, who later claimed to have invented it as Monopoly.

The Bellevue-Stratford was the headquarters of the 1936 and 1948 National Conventions of the U.S. Republican Party and the 1948 Convention of the Democratic Party.

On October 30, 1963, President John F. Kennedy appeared at a campaign dinner for Philadelphia mayor James Tate at the Bellevue-Stratford, weeks before he was assassinated. The hotel's reputation began to decline in the 1960s.

In 1976, the hotel gained worldwide notoriety when it hosted a statewide convention of the American Legion. Soon after, a pneumonia-like disease killed 29 people and sickened 182 more who had been in the hotel. The vast majority were members of the convention. The negative publicity associated with what became known as "Legionnaires' disease" caused occupancy at the Bellevue-Stratford to plummet to 4 percent, and the hotel finally closed on November 18, 1976.

In 1977, Joseph McDade discovered a new bacterium, which was identified as the causative organism. It thrives in hot, damp places like the water of the cooling towers for the Bellevue-Stratford's air-conditioning system, which spread the disease throughout the hotel. The bacterium was named Legionella and the disease, legionellosis, after the first victims. The outbreak led to increased scrutiny of building ventilation systems and contributed to the development of public health protocols regarding water quality and HVAC maintenance to prevent Legionella proliferation.

The empty building was listed in the National Register of Historic Places in 1977.

In June 1978, the Bellevue-Stratford was sold to the Richard I. Rubin Company for $8.25 million. Developer Ronald Rubin had a personal connection to the hotel and wished to see it saved. Decades before, his father Richard Rubin, a Ukrainian immigrant, got his first job delivering shoes from exclusive local stores to guests at The Bellevue-Stratford. Rubin undertook a $25-million restoration of the hotel. The guest rooms were completely gutted and their number reduced from 725 to 565, while the public areas were painstakingly restored to their 1904 appearance. 44,000 square yards of carpet were imported from Ireland, 25 tons of marble came from Portugal and crystal chandeliers were sourced from Uruguay.

The hotel reopened on September 26, 1979, managed by Fairmont Hotels, as the Fairmont Hotel. The following year, Western International Hotels bought a 49-percent interest in the hotel and assumed management on November 15, 1980, returning the hotel to its original name, Bellevue Stratford. Two months later, Western International was itself renamed Westin Hotels, and the hotel was renamed The Westin Bellevue Stratford in 1983. That same year, the hotel opened a 475-space parking garage on adjacent land, formerly occupied by the Art Club of Philadelphia.

By the mid-1980s, the hotel was struggling to fill its hundreds of rooms. Philadelphia had lower hotel occupancy rates than other major East Coast cities at the time, and a lengthy conflict between city and state officials over financing for a new convention center, which would eventually open in 1993, meant that demand for hotel rooms in Center City was even lower than expected. The Westin Bellevue Stratford's occupancy rate was 55 percent, far below the 65–70 percent necessary to break even. It had operated at a total cash loss of $25 million from 1979 to 1985, never once turning a profit since its restoration. As a result, the hotel's owners announced in January 1986 that the hotel would close on February 2.

A lawsuit filed by the union representing the hotel's over 450 employees, over the short notice given to its members, resulted in an agreement to keep the hotel open until April 2. With The Westin Bellevue Stratford's advance bookings transferred to other hotels as a result of the closure announcement, only two floors of guest rooms remained in use by that point, with only 10 to 15 guests a night in the enormous building. The union finally accepted a settlement of $500,000, along with a promise that the renovated hotel would remain a union shop, and agreed to an earlier closing date. The Westin Bellevue Stratford closed on March 7, 1986.

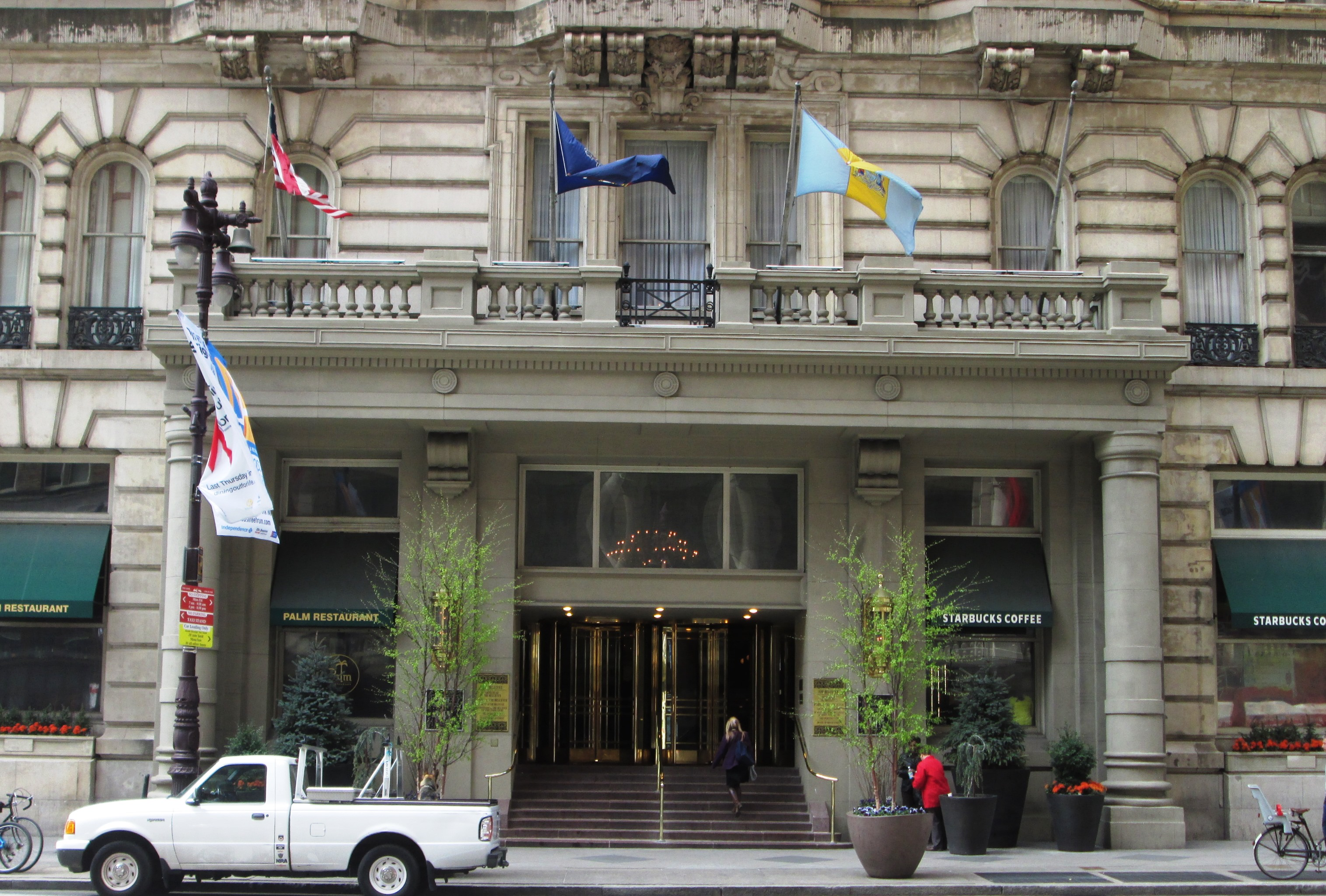
The main Broad Street entrance in 2013; the decorative portico is a darker stone because the original was removed in the 1950s and it had to be recreated in the 1979 restoration from original plans.

The Rubin Company bought out Westin's stake in the hotel and again undertook extensive work on the building, at a cost of $100 million, designed by architects from RTKL Associates Inc. in Baltimore and the Vitetta Group-Studio Four of Philadelphia. The building's name was shortened to The Bellevue. The grand public areas on the ground floor were converted to 55,000 sq ft of retail space. A huge atrium was cut into the lobby and escalators were installed leading to an underground shopping area and food court. The parking garage adjacent to the hotel had a 70,000 sq ft fitness club built on top of it to serve the complex. The hotel rooms on floors 3 to 11 were converted into 280,000 sq ft of office space, entered through the original main entrance facing Broad Street, with the office portion opening on December 5, 1988.

The hotel portion was condensed to 170 guest rooms on floors 12 to 18. The hotel was entered through a small foyer on the ground floor facing Chancellor Court, with the lobby and public rooms on the remodeled 19th floor. The two domed ballrooms on that floor (the South and North Cameo rooms), were turned into the Ethel Barrymore Tea Room and a restaurant called Founders, with statues of Philadelphia fathers William Penn, Benjamin Franklin, David Rittenhouse, and Charles Willson Peale. The middle wing of the E-shaped building was removed from the guest room floors 12 to 18, and the back side was sealed up, creating an atrium. The historic 19th-floor Rose Ballroom atop this middle wing was retained, however, standing on seven-story stilts which ran through the atrium.

The hotel portion reopened on April 1, 1989, as the Hotel Atop The Bellevue, managed under a 10-year lease by Cunard Hotels & Resorts, the hotel division of the Cunard Line.

The hotel opened to protests by unionized former employees, because Cunard was not part of the agreement to rehire them and had not done so. Cunard's hotel division proved financially unsuccessful and soon folded. Cunard terminated its lease on the hotel on February 7, 1993. The long-planned new Pennsylvania Convention Center opened in July 1993, helping increase occupancy at hotels across Center City.

Interstate Hotels & Resorts of Pittsburgh assumed management in December 1994 and the hotel's name was shortened to The Bellevue Hotel.

On December 1, 1996, Hyatt took over management of the hotel, placing it in their Park Hyatt boutique division and renaming it the Park Hyatt Philadelphia at the Bellevue.

=== 21st century ===
In 2007, the two restaurants and Founders bar were re-designed by Marguerite Rodgers as XIX (NINETEEN) Cafe, Bar and Restaurant. In 2009, all four balconies outside the cafe and restaurant were restored and opened to the public for the highest outside dining experience in the city. In 2010, the hotel was moved from the Park Hyatt to the Hyatt division and its name was shortened to Hyatt at The Bellevue. The hotel moved to The Unbound Collection division of Hyatt in March 2018, and was renamed The Bellevue Hotel. In late 2018, New York-based Nightingale Properties bought a stake in Bellevue Associates, the company under which the Rubin family had owned the building since 1978.

Rubin died in April 2021, and in November 2021, his estate sold the entire Bellevue structure to Lubert-Adler Partners, for an undisclosed sum. They announced plans to completely renovate the property, at a cost of $100 million. They converted the largely vacant office space on the lower floors to apartments, with 200-300 units to be built out, over time. The historic lobby level public areas, which most recently housed stores, were fully restored to their original function serving hotel guests, with three restaurants. On the Bellevue's rooftop, they plan to install an ice rink, which the hotel originally had, and a swimming pool. The adjoining Sporting Club at The Bellevue was also renovated, at a cost of $10 million, and reopened in November 2023. Fire fighters responded to a small fire on December 30, 2023, in a kitchen on the 18th floor, but there were no injuries.

In February 2024, it was announced that the hotel's grand ballroom and other function rooms would no longer be operated directly by the hotel business. Instead, since their reopening in April 2024, they have been operated by Cescaphe, a local events firm, under the name The Grand Belle.

In May 2024, it was reported that the final arrangement of the mixed-use structure was: 155 residences, with twenty-four different layouts, on the former office floors 2, 3, 4, 8, 9, 10, as well as on the former hotel floor 18; offices remaining on floors 5, 6, 7 and 11; 222 hotel rooms on floors 12-17, with the hotel lobby returned to the ground floor and the 19th floor again used solely as function rooms. The apartments began leasing in May 2024. The hotel portion reopened on November 1, 2024. The renovation included the restoration of the ground-floor lobby to its 1904 configuration, which involved recreating the decorative portico and reinstalling the elliptical staircase.

== See also ==
- National Register of Historic Places listings in Center City, Philadelphia
