= Education (Chittenden Memorial Window) =

Stained-glass window designed by Tiffany Studios

Coordinates: 41.3084°N 72.9296°W

Education is a stained-glass window commissioned from Louis Comfort Tiffany's Tiffany Glass Company during the building of Yale University's Chittenden Hall (now Linsly-Chittenden Hall, after being connected to a nearby building), funded by Simeon Baldwin Chittenden. Personifications of Art, Science, Religion, and Music are represented in the work, as angels. Other angelic representations of related virtues, values, and ideas attend them, each identified by words in their halos.

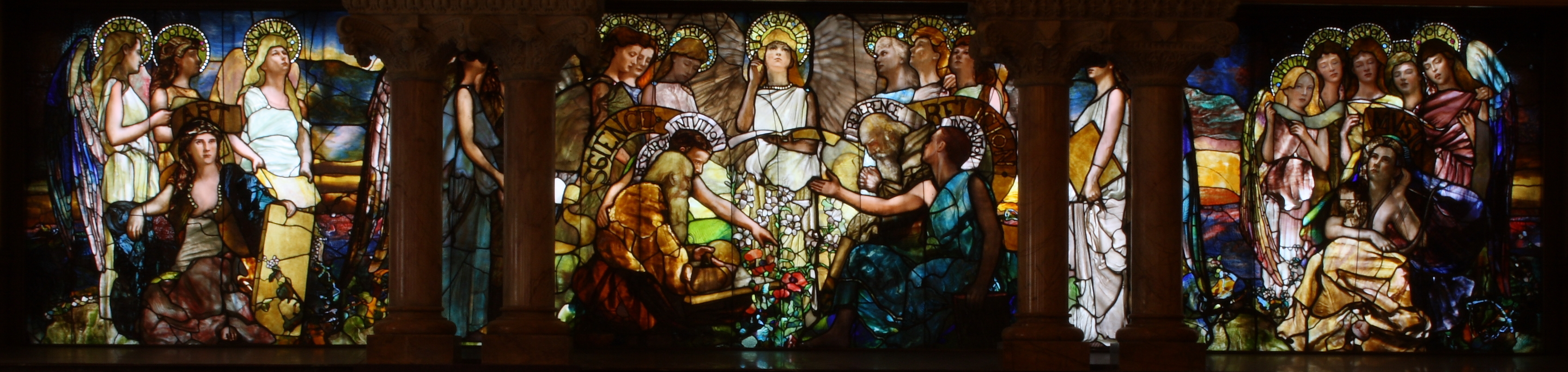
Education, 1890, by Louis Comfort Tiffany and Tiffany Studios

Originally overlooking the main reading room of the then new university library when installed in 1890, the window's location is now identified as room 102 of Linsly-Chittenden Hall, on the High Street side of the building. It is accompanied by a bronze plaque which states that the window had been commissioned to commemorate the daughter of the donor, with the intent of illustrating the biblical quote, "Through wisdom is a house builded, and by understanding it is established, and by knowledge shall the chambers be filled with all precious and pleasant riches".,

== Misidentification ==
In 1970, the Yale administration removed and crated the Tiffany window for storage in the Linsly-Chittenden basement for safekeeping, as part of a general strategy of securing vulnerable and valuable items on the Yale campus before the May Day protest on the New Haven Green that year. However, it was later discovered that the wrong windows had in fact been identified as the Tiffany window and removed and stored; it was the George Park Fisher Memorial Windows by Clayton and Bell, twelve large stained glass panels in the stairway to the library, each depicting a group of "men of letters" representing an epoch in literary history, which had been carefully packed for safekeeping in crates labelled "Tiffany" while the actual Tiffany window remained forgotten behind a dirty blackout curtain in a classroom on the other side of the building. The error was particularly striking in view of the Tiffany window having been widely identified as a single window, while the Clayton and Bell windows were twelve separate panels, which had to be individually removed and packed. Ironically, the failure to remove the correct window likely saved the Tiffany window for the university, as eleven of the twelve crates holding the other window but erroneously labeled as "Tiffany" vanished from the Linsly-Chittenden basement, either stolen or simply mislaid. In the meantime, the real Tiffany window has been cleaned and restored and is accompanied by a plaque identifying it.

== Details ==
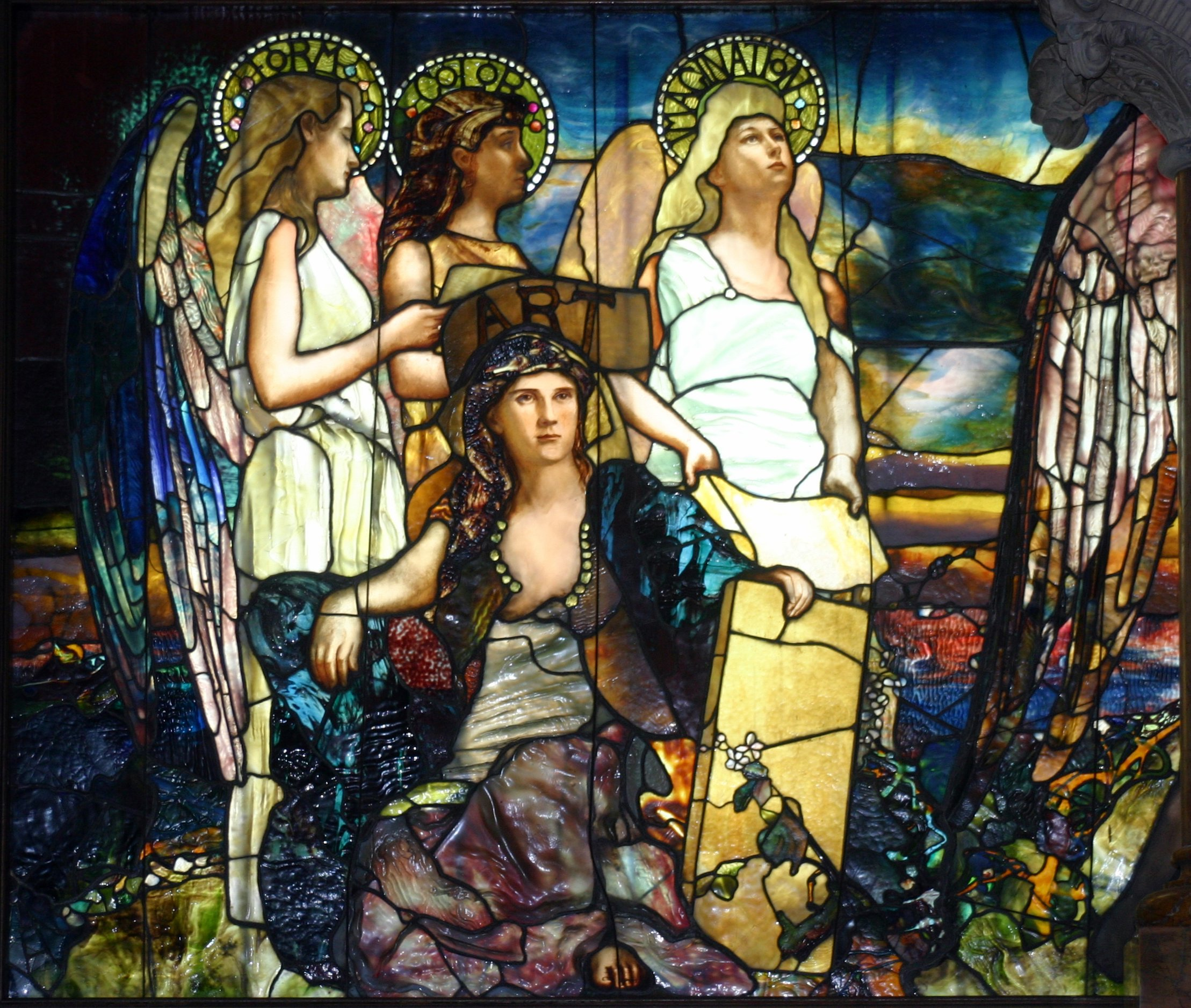
The left section personifies Art, attended by personifications of Form, Color and Imagination.

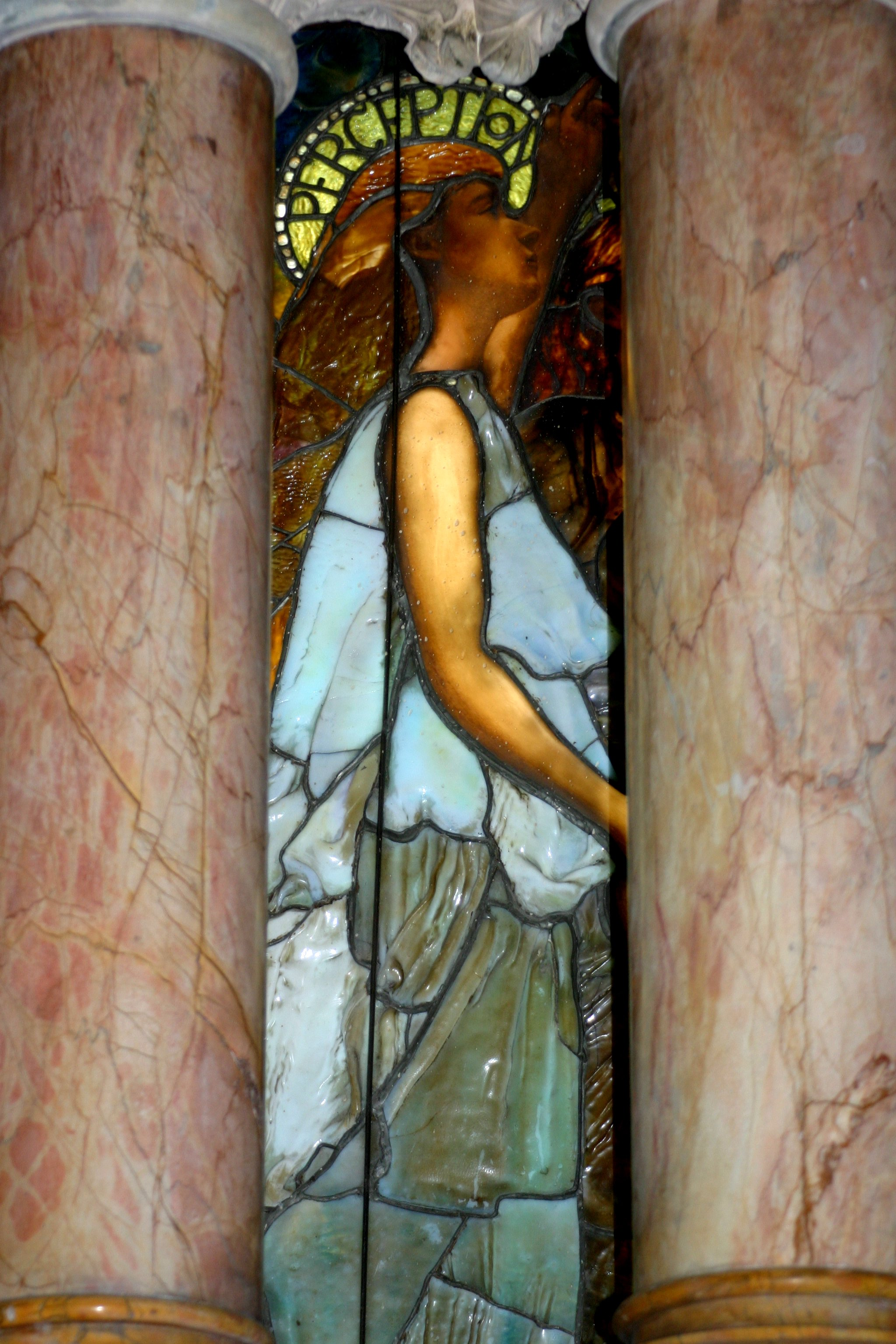
Personifications of Perception (seen here) and Analysis (obscured by a pillar) connect Art and Science.

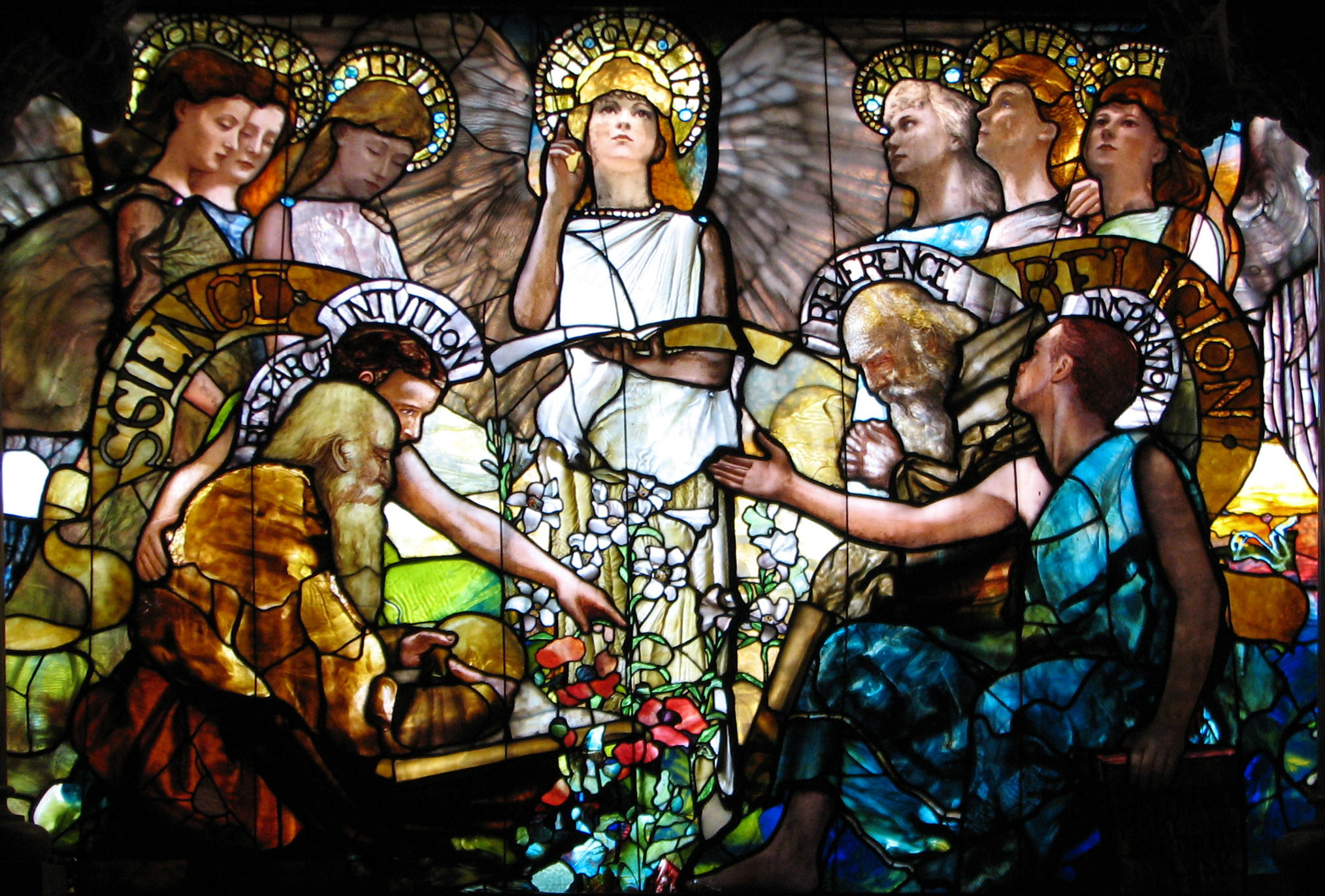
The center section depicts Science at the left, attended by personifications of Devotion, Labor, Truth, Research and Intuition; and Religion at the right, personified by Purity, Faith, Hope, Reverence and Inspiration; and presided over by the central personification of "Light·Love·Life".

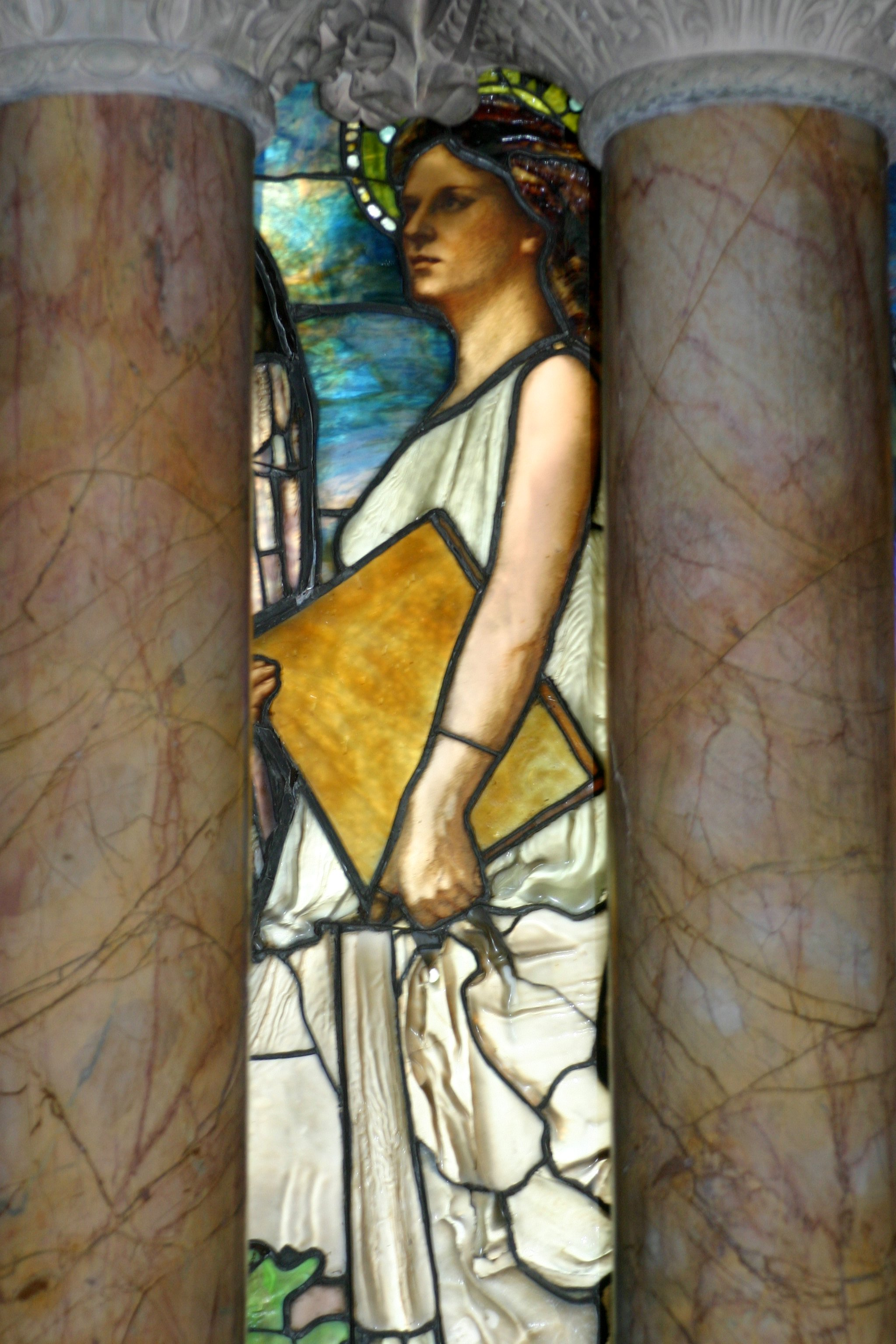
A personification of Law connects Music and Religion.

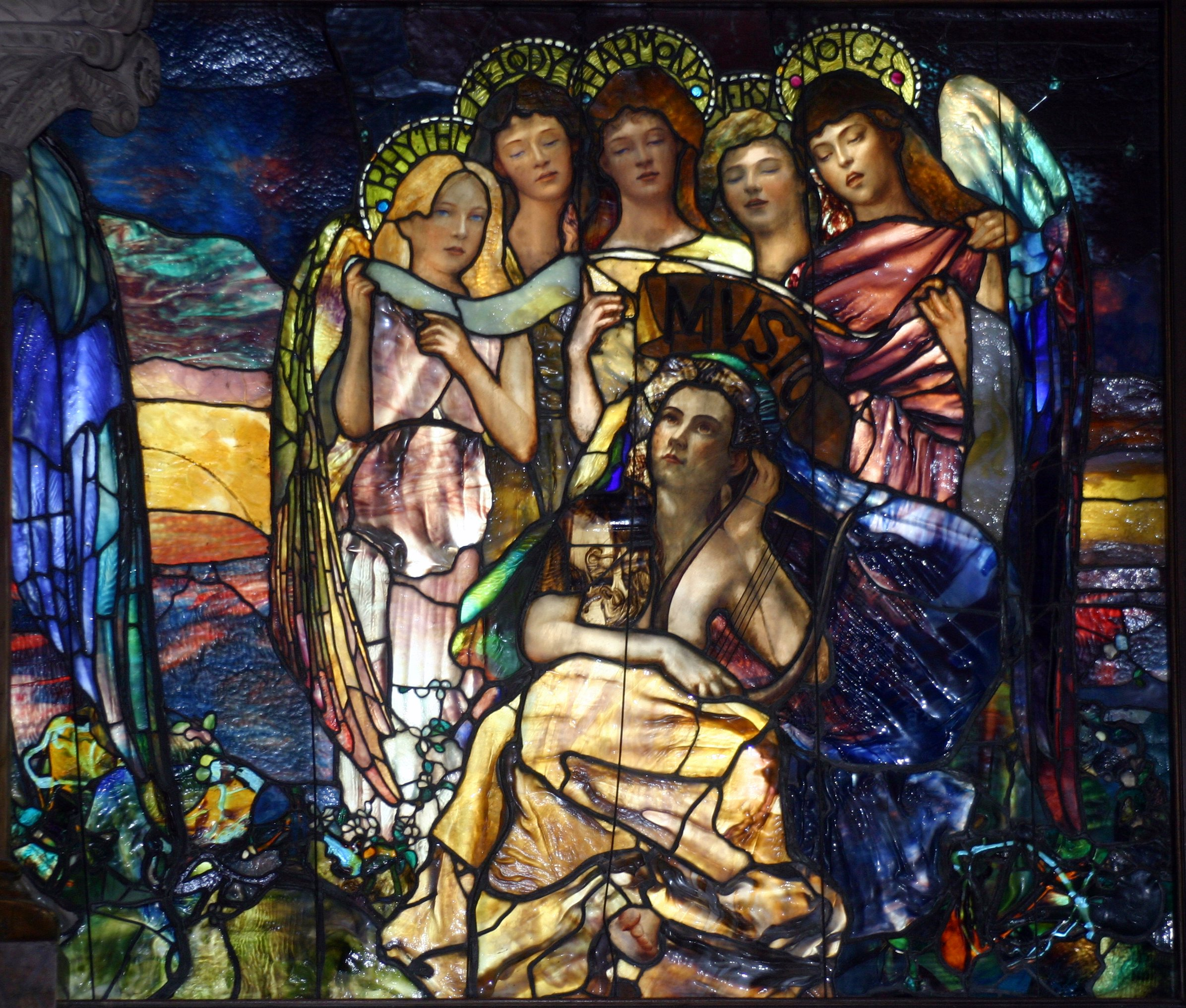
The right section personifies Music, attended by personifications of Rhythm, Melody, Harmony, Verse, and Voice.
