= Duffner and Kimberly =

Lamp manufacturer in New York City

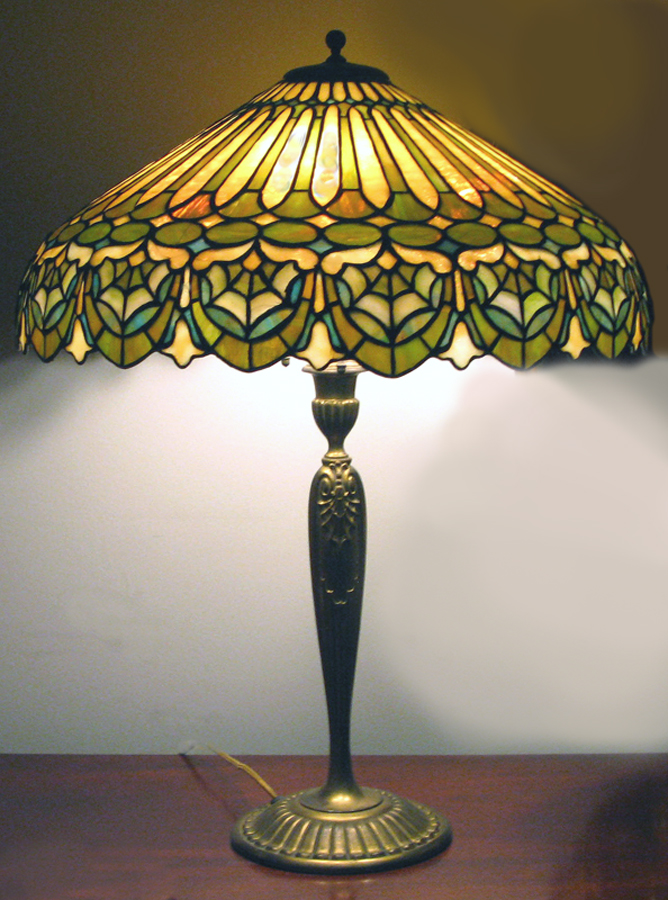
Duffner & Kimberly spiderweb lamp with gilt leading and gilt bronze base, circa 1905–1911

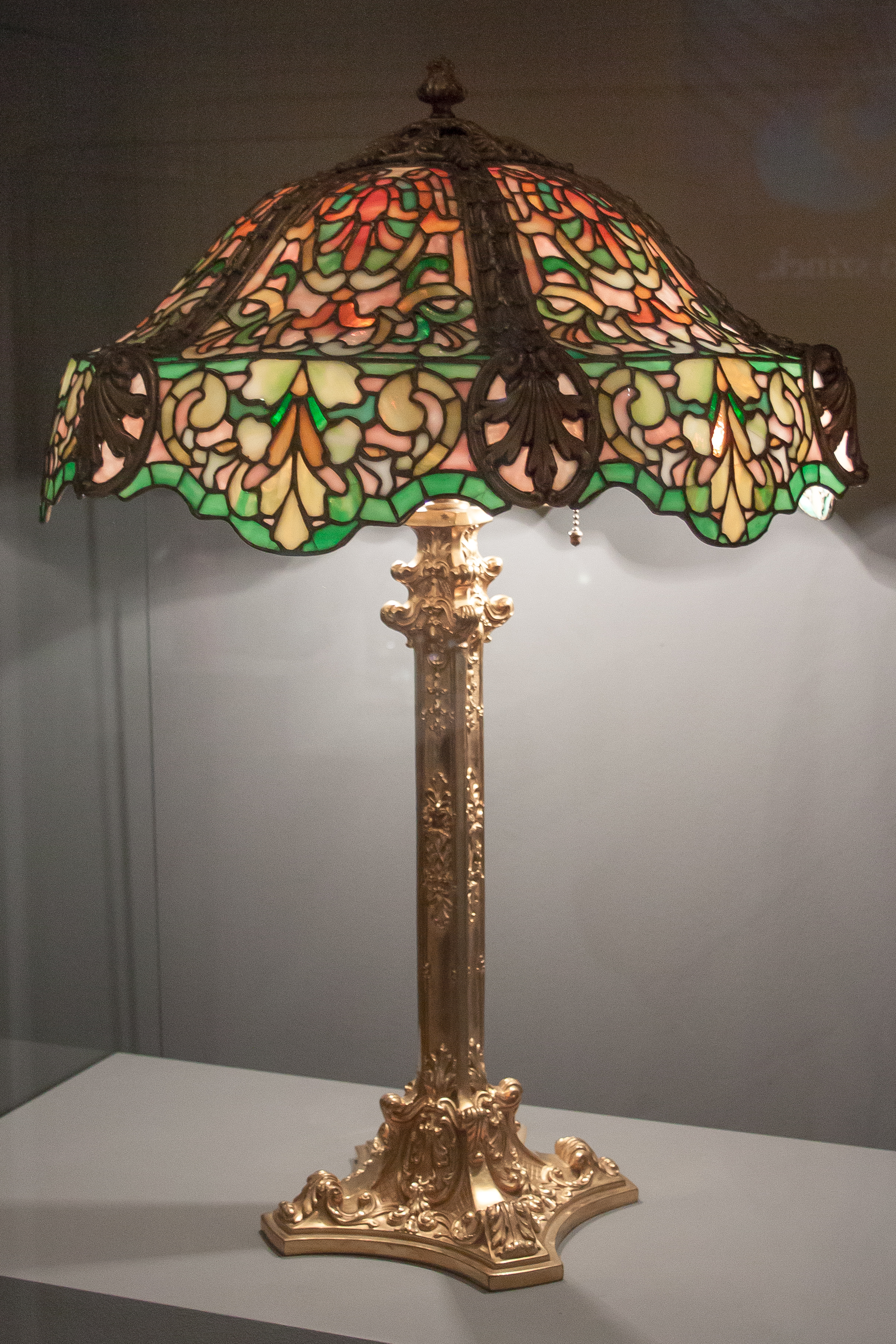
Duffner & Kimberly lamp circa 1890–1900

Duffner & Kimberly was a New York City company which produced leaded glass and bronze lamps around the same time as Louis Comfort Tiffany's Tiffany Studios. The Duffner & Kimberly Company was formed in December 1905, with a capital outlay of $350,000. The firm introduced its first lamps in 1906. Their lamps were close in quality to Tiffany lamps. The company dissolved in 1911 due to financial difficulties following the Panic of 1907.

== Founding ==
The company resulted from the partnership of the creative stained glass window designer Oliver Speers Kimberly (1871–1956) and Francis ("Frank") Joseph Duffner (1860–1929), born in Cleveland, Ohio, who had more than 20 years of experience in the lighting industry.

=== Frank Duffner ===
Duffner's parents were Charles Duffner (1827-1891) and Margaretha ("Maggie") Duffner (1829-1886). They were immigrants from Germany, and it appears that Francis was their only surviving child. Charles Duffner ran a china and crockery store in Cleveland, which he owned in partnership with his older brother, Joseph Duffner (1825-1898). Francis worked in the store as a clerk, and was working there as late as 1880, at the time of the enumeration of the Federal Census.

His first known employment was with the Bradley and Hubbard Manufacturing Company of Meriden, Connecticut, for a few years from about 1881. Before 1885, he was employed by the Manhattan Brass Company, founded in New York City in 1865. On March 11, 1886, he founded the Pittsburgh Brass Company with Henry C. Adler (1840–1912) and Cornelius Bermingham (1853–1932). In 1888, Adler left the firm to found a competing enterprise, and Joseph Duffner sold his interest to Bermingham (who was still listed as President of the company in 1900). From 1889 through 1901, he was head of the Lamp Department for The Phoenix Glass Company, located in Monaca, Pennsylvania; however, Duffner was located in the company's office and showrooms in New York City.

In July 1898, Duffner was granted a U.S. Patent for a new lamp dome design. He changed employment again in 1901, and became a manager with The Plume and Atwood firm, a Waterbury, Connecticut, concern which manufactured brass rivets, nuts, and bolts, as well as kerosene lamps. Again, Duffner was located at Plume and Atwood's New York City office. It appears that Duffner's permanent home was in Lock Haven, Pennsylvania, where his wife, Caroline ("Carrie") K. Armstrong Duffner (1864–1943) was born.

There is no evidence to suggest that Francis Joseph Duffner was responsible for any creative input to this partnership, but rather was President to plan marketing strategy against this company's main competitor, Tiffany Studios, and to guide the company to high profitability. Other contemporary competitors to Tiffany included Pairpoint Glass and the Handel Company.

=== Oliver Speers Kimberly ===
Oliver Speers Kimberly was born on June 20, 1871, in Guilford, Connecticut. His parents were Eli Kimberly (1820-1874), a lumber inspector, and Mary Kerr (1845-1916), who was Eli's second wife. Oliver had a younger brother, Harry Standish Kimberly (1873-1966), who was born a year before their father's death. After Eli died, Mary Kerr Kimberly took her sons to New York City to live with her mother. Oliver's artistic talents were developed there, as were the artistic abilities of his younger brother. Harry designed lamp bases and shades for the Duffner & Kimberly Company. (A note: Oliver's half-brother, Arthur Stone Kimberly (1857-1933), was a director of the Duffner & Kimberly Company, and most likely was an investor, as well.)

Oliver Kimberly worked for Tiffany in the window department, but was transferred to the lamp department. He worked there a short time before he left to enter a partnership with Thomas Calvert (1873-1961), a transplanted Englishman and also one of Tiffany's artists. The Calvert and Kimberly Company lasted until late 1905, when Kimberly entered into this partnership with Francis Joseph Duffner.

== Key staff ==
Together, Duffner and Kimberly hired several important artists, among them, Hamilton Tappan Howell (1872–1952), a designer responsible for many of the early strong lamp designs. They hired as their chief designer Gazo Foudji (1853–1916), also known in contemporary sources as Fudji and Fudjiyama, who was a famous Japanese artist of the period and a graduate of the Ecole des Beaux-Arts. Foudji had also worked for Tiffany and prior to that, in 1905 and 1906, for the Roseville Pottery Company and the Weller Pottery Company.

Another important stained glass artist of the firm was John Gordon Guthrie (1874–1961), a Scottish immigrant, known professionally as "J. Gordon Guthrie", who first worked for Tiffany. Guthrie had designed windows for Tiffany Studios and also designed windows for Duffner & Kimberly. A large, early example of his stained glass windows, dating from 1911 while he was employed by the Duffner & Kimberly firm is found in Grace and Holy Trinity Cathedral, the cathedral church of the Episcopal Diocese of West Missouri, located in Kansas City, Missouri. Guthrie left Tiffany in 1906 and worked for Duffner & Kimberly until 1914. He then worked with Henry Wynd Young (1874–1923) until Young's death in 1923, when Guthrie took over the management of Young's studio. Guthrie began his own firm in 1925, and was active as a stained glass designer until his death on June 23, 1961.

== Closure ==
The workmanship of the bronze and quality of glass was on a par with Tiffany's lamps. Many of the lamp bases were designed by Oliver Kimberly's younger brother, Harry Standish Kimberly (1873–1966). However, the firm ran into financial difficulties during the recession which followed the Panic of 1907. The firm's financial difficulties were compounded when it experienced a fire in its factory on 26th Street in December 1910. Duffner & Kimberly filed for bankruptcy on April 13, 1911, but Francis Joseph Duffner dissolved the partnership and left the firm, which was reorganized in late May or early June 1911 into The Kimberly Company.

Although he was forced into bankruptcy by his creditors in 1913, Oliver Speers Kimberly successfully opened a new firm called The O.S. Kimberly Company in June 1914, with a new partner named Frank G. Noble (1875–1966). It appears that at that point, the firm permanently ceased production of art glass lamps. Kimberly successfully managed this company until sometime between 1923 and 1926, when he finally closed the stained glass firm and moved to Norwalk, Connecticut. Mr. Kimberly married a second time after the death of his wife and returned to New York City, where he died on February 25, 1956, after a long illness. Francis Joseph Duffner died of a heart attack while at his desk in his office at The Rolled Plate Metal Company, in New York City, on June 11, 1929.
