= Tiffany lamp =

Type of lamp with colorful glass shade

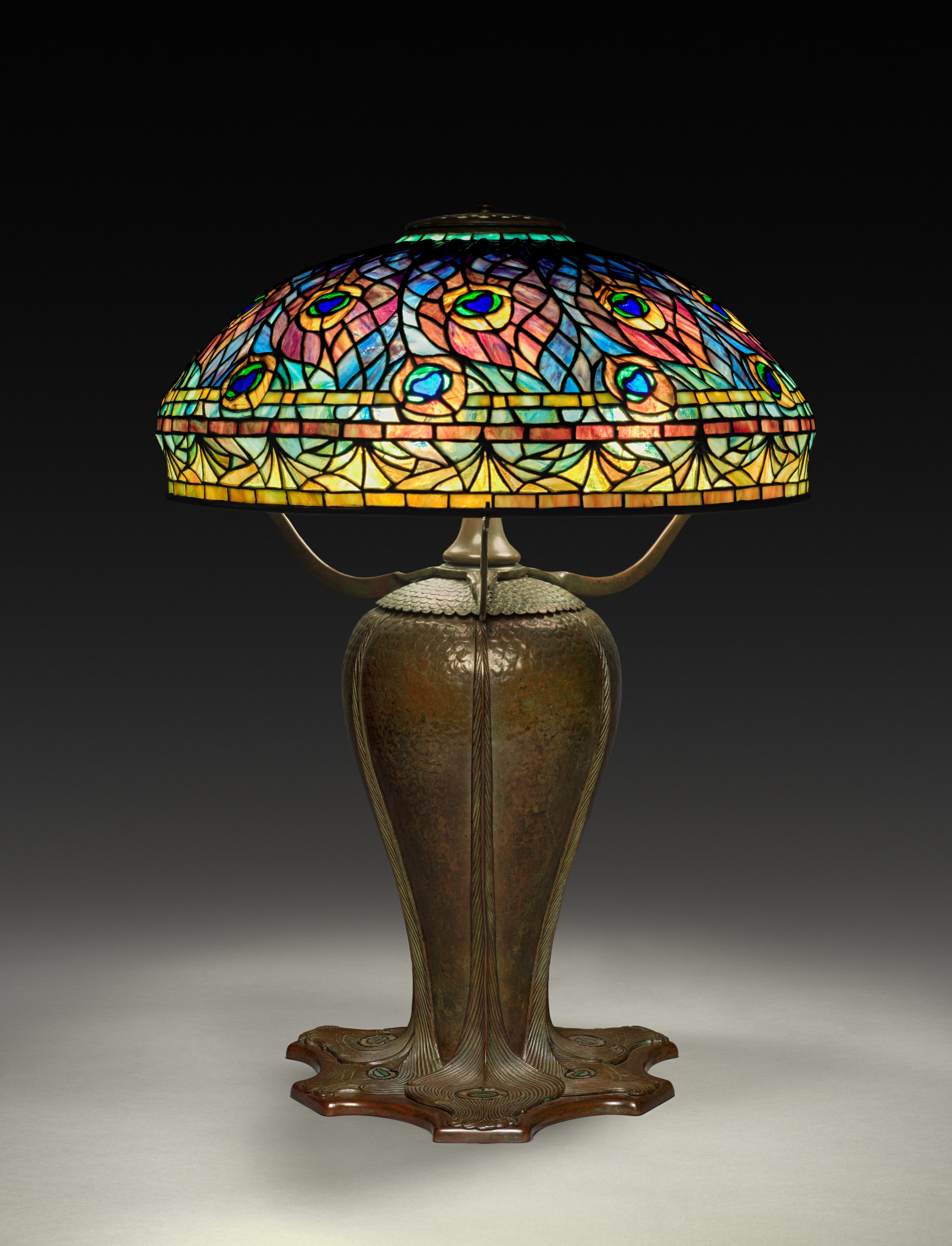
Peacock table lamp c. 1902, in the Cleveland Museum of Art

A Tiffany lamp is a type of lamp with a glass shade designed by Louis Comfort Tiffany and collaborators, including Clara Driscoll, made in his design studio in Corona, Queens, New York City. The Tiffany glass in the lampshades is put together with the copper-foil technique instead of lead came, the classic technique for stained glass windows. Tiffany lamps were part of the Art Nouveau movement, specifically Art Nouveau glass. Tiffany Studios produced considerable numbers of designs between 1893 and the 1920s, when the company went out of business.

Tiffany lamps were a fashionable piece of decorative art in the 1890s and early 1900s but fell out of style by the 1930s. By the 1960s, they were in demand again, but since there were a limited number of the original lamps, many companies started producing replicas and new styles influenced by Tiffany. The original lamps are valued by collectors and sell for between thousands and millions of dollars.

Due to Tiffany's dominant influence on the style, people use the terms Tiffany lamp and Tiffany-style lamp for stained-glass, leaded lamps in general, even those not made by Tiffany Studios.

== History ==
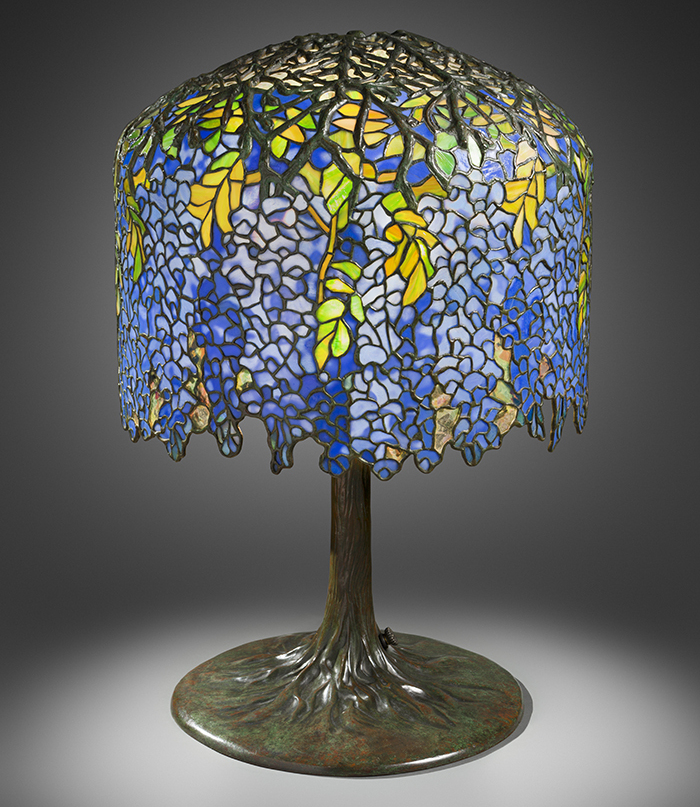
Wisteria shade likely designed by Clara Driscoll, c. 1905–1906, in the Crystal Bridges Museum of American Art

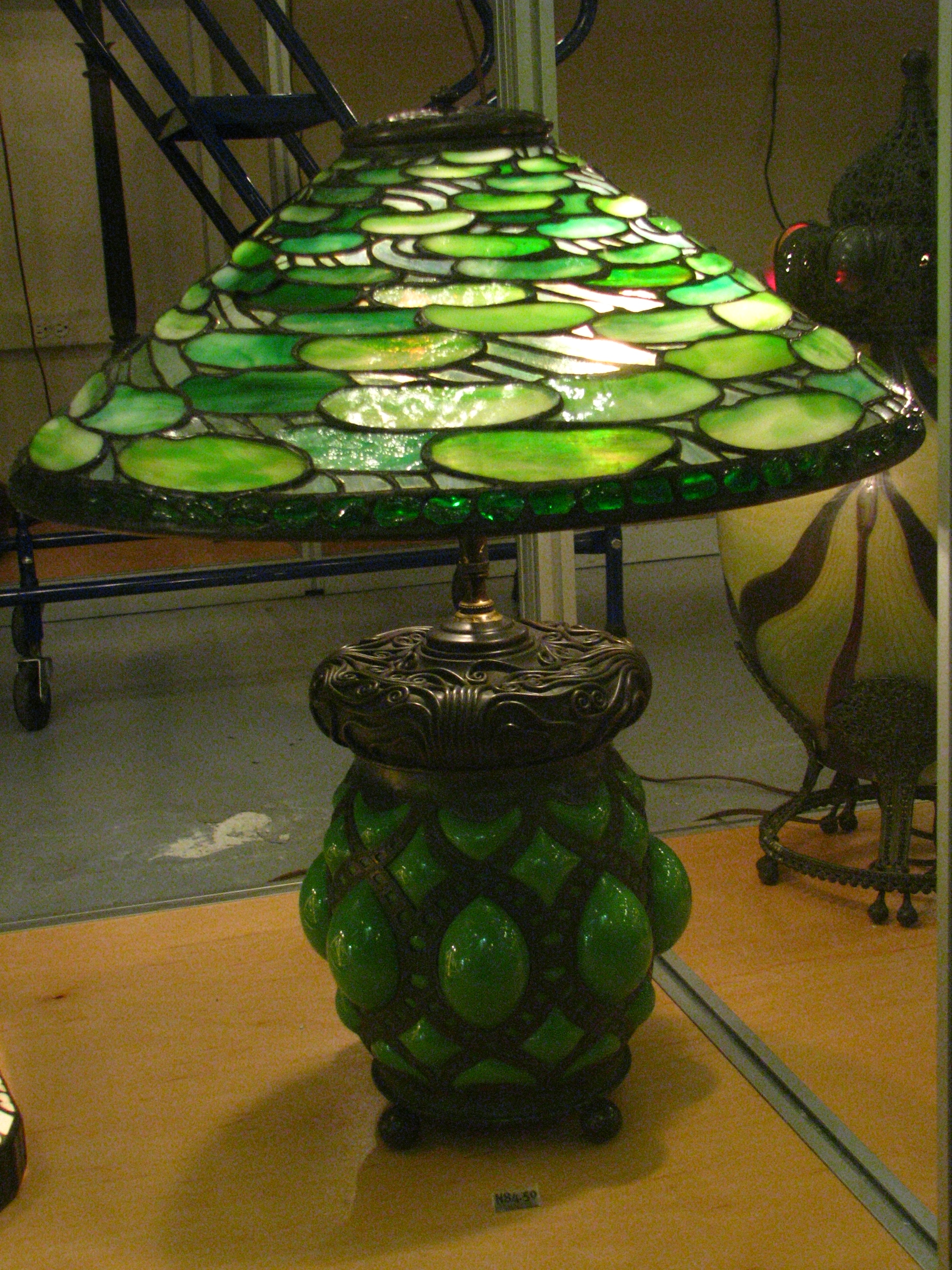
Table lamp c. 1900–1906

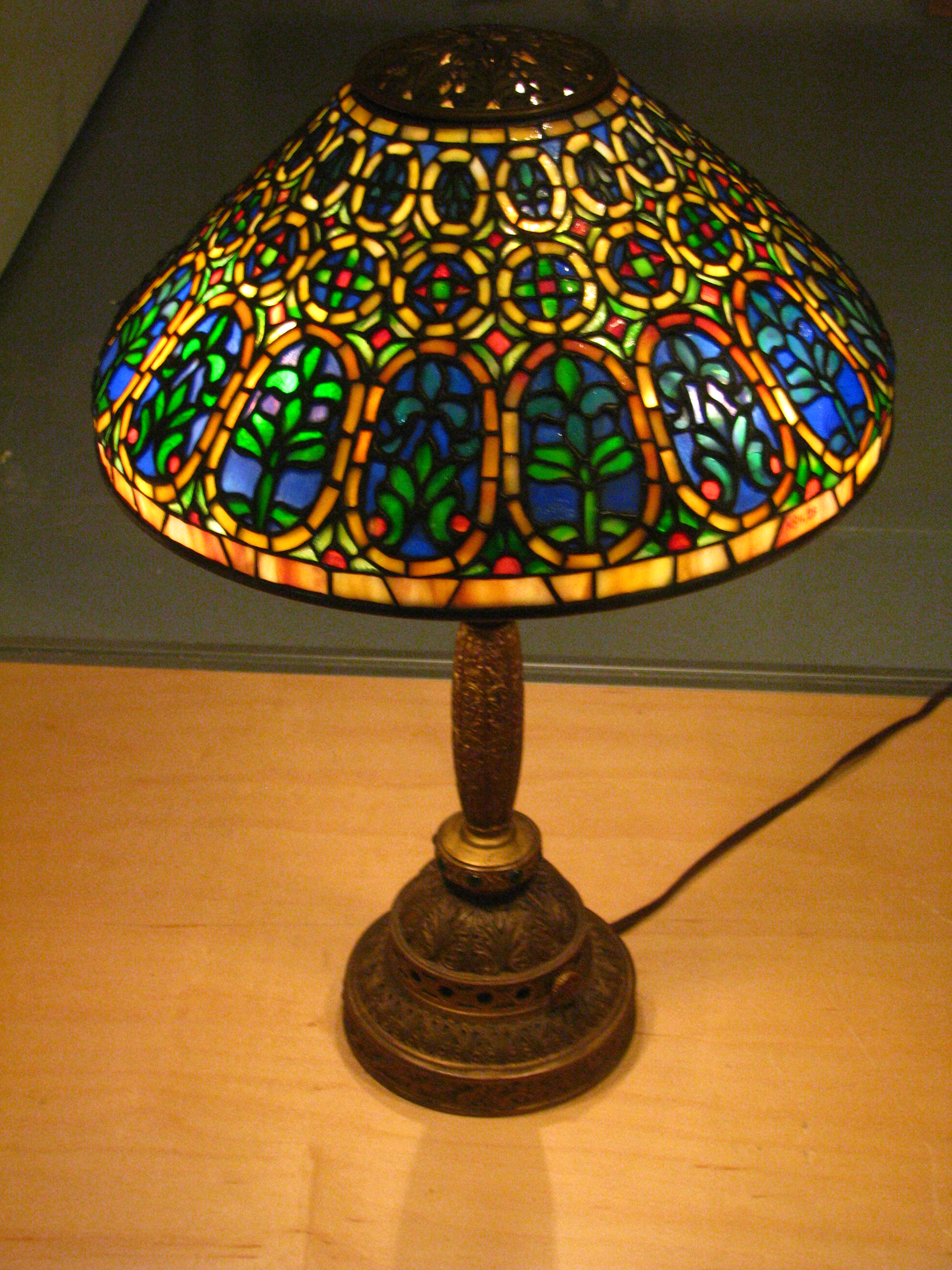
"Venetian" desk lamp c. 1910–1920

Tiffany's first business venture was an interior design firm in New York City, which disbanded in 1883. Afterward, he focused more on glasswork, including stained-glass windows and custom chandeliers designed to match specific interiors. Tiffany's designs gained popularity after the World's Columbian Exposition in Chicago in 1893, where he displayed his custom ceiling light fixtures in the Byzantine-like Tiffany Chapel.

In the late 1890s Tiffany developed and marketed lamps to sell as individual objects to upper-middle-class customers, and they sold very well. They were considered status symbols. Many of the lamps were not designed by, as had been thought for over 100 years, Tiffany himself, but by Clara Driscoll. She was identified in 2007 by Rutgers professor Martin Eidelberg as being the master designer behind the most creative and valuable leaded-glass lamps produced by Tiffany Studios. Driscoll worked with other designers including Alice Carmen Gouvy. Each lamp was handmade by skilled craftspeople according to Tiffany's specifications. The lamps had bronze bases also designed and produced by Tiffany Studios. Although they may be the most widely known of Tiffany Studios work, he was more interested in the custom artistic side of his businesses than factory-based lamp production.

The Tiffany Chapel had caught the eye of many people, most notably Wilhelm Bode and Julius Lessing, directors of state museums in Berlin. Lessing purchased a few custom light fixtures to display in the Museum of Decorative Arts, making it the first European museum to own Tiffany glass. Though Tiffany's work was popular in Germany, other countries, such as France, were not as taken by it because of its relation to American crafts. Tiffany was only able to break into the French market by having the production of his works taken over by Siegfried Bing, with the assistance of many French artists. Without Bing’s access and contacts in Europe, Tiffany would not have had as much success selling his works to a European audience. Tiffany’s success throughout Europe was largely due to the success of his works in the German and Austro-Hungarian markets through a series of exhibitions beginning in 1897 at the International Art Exhibition in Dresden. After the partnership between Tiffany and Bing ended, interest in Tiffany products began to decline slowly in Europe.

Early production of Tiffany lamps was protected by a patent on the assembly method, but after the patent expired in 1903, other companies produced similar lamps. Competitors included Duffner and Kimberly, Pairpoint Glass, and the Handel Company.

Tiffany Studios stopped producing their more colorful and extravagant designs by about 1910, as tastes started to shift toward Art Deco and modern aesthetics. The company went out of business in the late 1920s. By the 1930s, the lamps had fallen out of style in the United States and were seen as old-fashioned. Paul Nassau, a gallery owner, said that "During World War II, they would take the lamps and smash them on the sidewalk to sell the lead."

=== Revival ===
Between the 1950s and 1980s, people became more interested in Art Nouveau style again, and as interest grew in Tiffany lamps, companies started mass production of replica lamps to meet demand. Writer Susan Sontag described Tiffany lamps as camp in her essay Notes on "Camp" in 1964. In the 1970s, celebrities such as Barbra Streisand and Catherine Deneuve began collecting Tiffany lamps. People also started purchasing Tiffany lamps as investments, speculating that prices would increase. In 1984, David Geffen auctioned his Tiffany collection, including a magnolia floor lamp for $528,000. The Baltimore Museum of Art, Smithsonian National Museum of American Art, and Chrysler Museum of Art held Tiffany exhibits in 1989. In 1990 and 1998, the Metropolitan Museum of Art in New York City held major exhibits of Tiffany work, including lamps.

Original Tiffany lamps sell for between thousands and millions of dollars. In 1992, the record price for a Tiffany object was $770,000 for a cobweb lamp with a glass mosaic base. In 1997, a lotus table lamp set a new record by selling for $2.8 million. The highest recorded price for an individual lamp was $4.4 million in 2025 for a magnolia floor lamp.

== Design ==
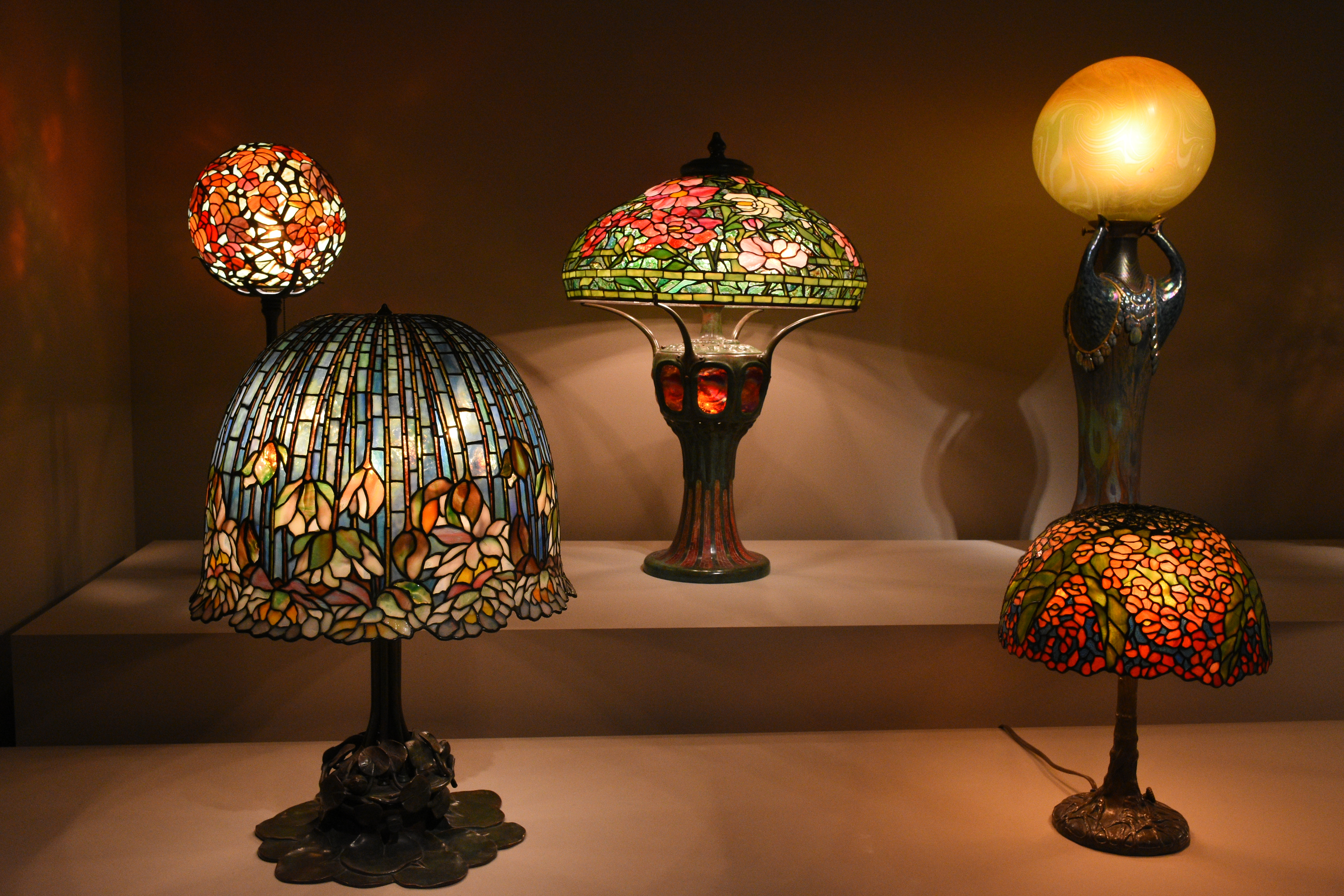
Collection of Tiffany lamps in the Virginia Museum of Fine Arts

Egon Neustadt, an early and significant collector of Tiffany lamps, classified lamps by pattern and shape and grouped them into these categories:

- Favrile: The Favrile category, which means handcrafted, identifies the first lamps Tiffany made. Tiffany's initials, L.C.T., later replaced the Favrile stamp.
- Geometric: For geometric lamps, Tiffany craftsmen used geometric shapes such as triangles, squares, rectangles, and ovals to form the patterns for these lamps.
- Transition to flowers: Next is the transition to flowers group, which is subdivided into the flowered cone and globe lamps. These lamps follow a natural, or botanical, design using flowers, dragonflies, spiders with webs, butterflies, and peacock feathers. The difference within these two smaller categories is the difference in the lamp shapes, basically a cone and a globe.
- Irregular lower borders, then irregular upper and lower borders. The irregular upper and lower border lamps carry an openwork crown edge that helps to simulate a branch, tree, or shrubbery.

== Production ==
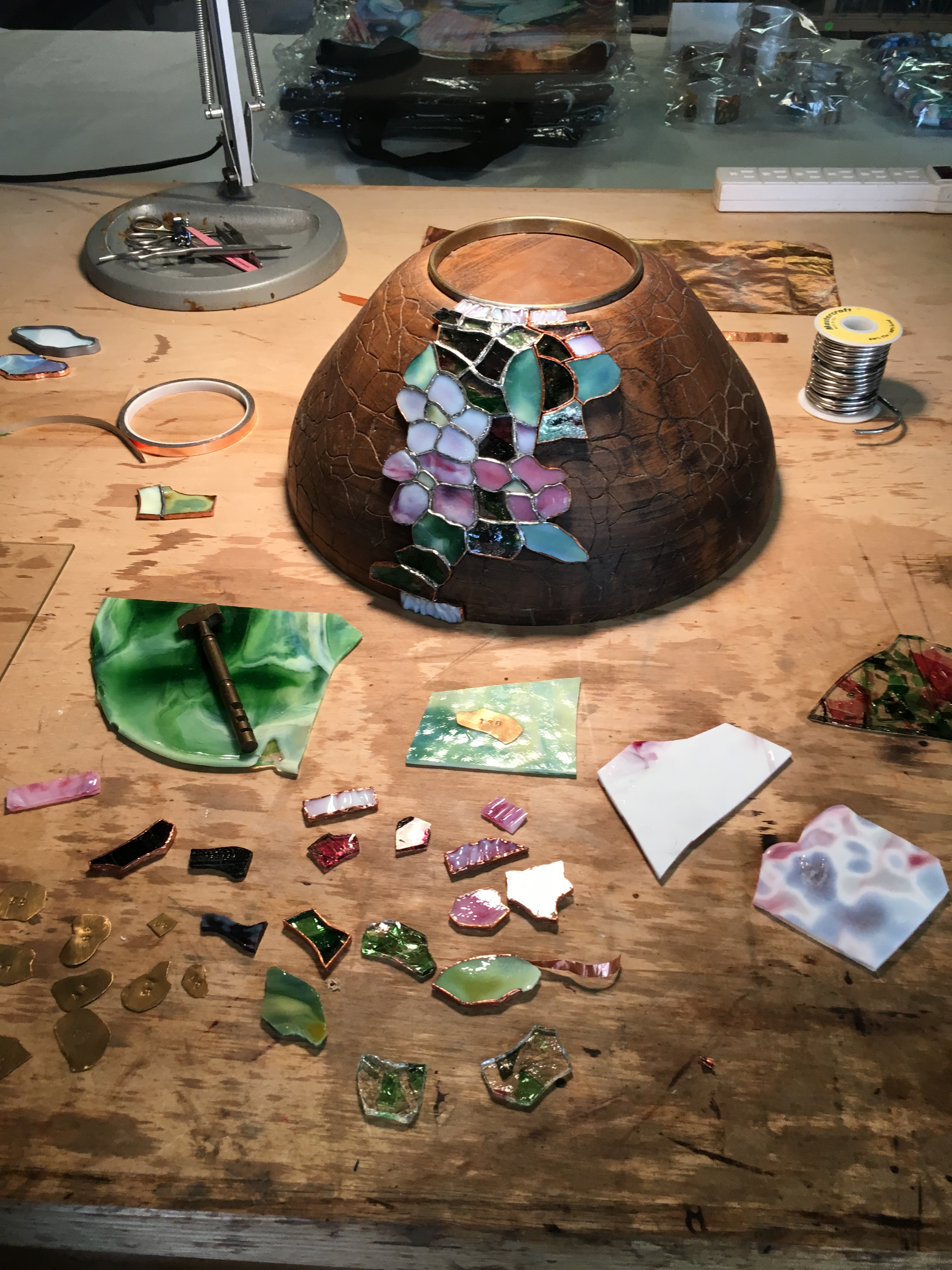
Reproduction of workspace, Neustadt Gallery, Queens Museum

Most lamps were prepared by using the copper-foil method. First, a designer created a watercolor sketch of the design, approved by Tiffany. Following hand-colored paper patterns, staff created numbered metal templates for each piece of glass. After selecting sheets of glass with the right colors and cutting the individual pieces of glass, they assembled the pieces together. They wrapped each piece of glass with thin strips of copper foil, then soldered the wrapped pieces together on the wood mold.

== Collections ==
In New York City, the New York Historical holds 132 lamps in the Dr. Egon Neustadt Collection of Tiffany Glass. The Queens Museum has a long-term exhibit with another large portion of Neustadt's collection, less than two miles away from the workshops where the work was produced. The Metropolitan Museum of Art also has a major collection of Tiffany work, including lamps.

The Charles Hosmer Morse Museum of American Art in Winter Park, Florida, holds a comprehensive collection of Tiffany lamps and other studio work.

The Cleveland Museum of Art has 20 lamps. The Virginia Museum of Fine Arts in Richmond, Virginia, also has a large collection of lamps.

== Gallery ==
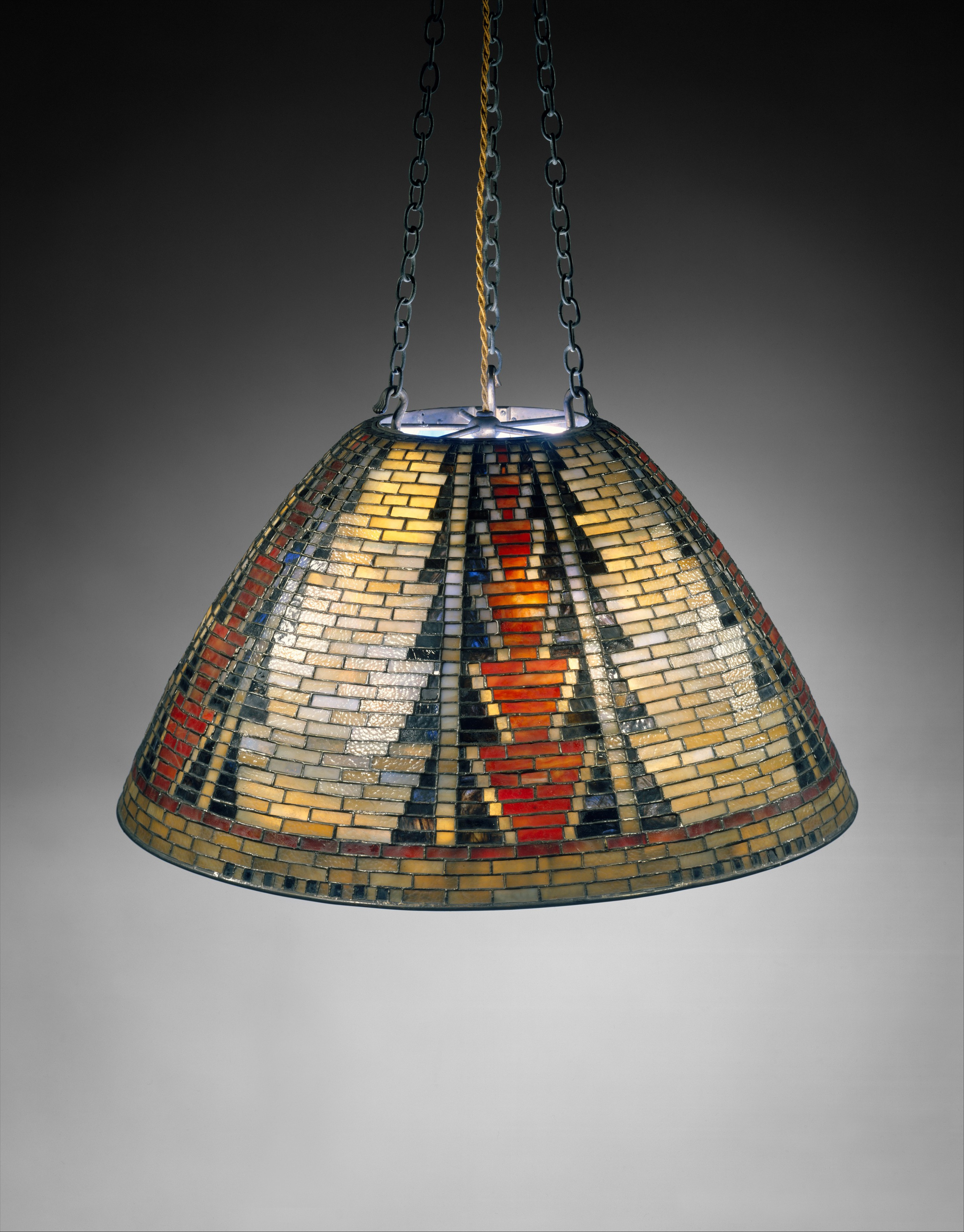
Geometric "Indian basket" chandelier circa 1899

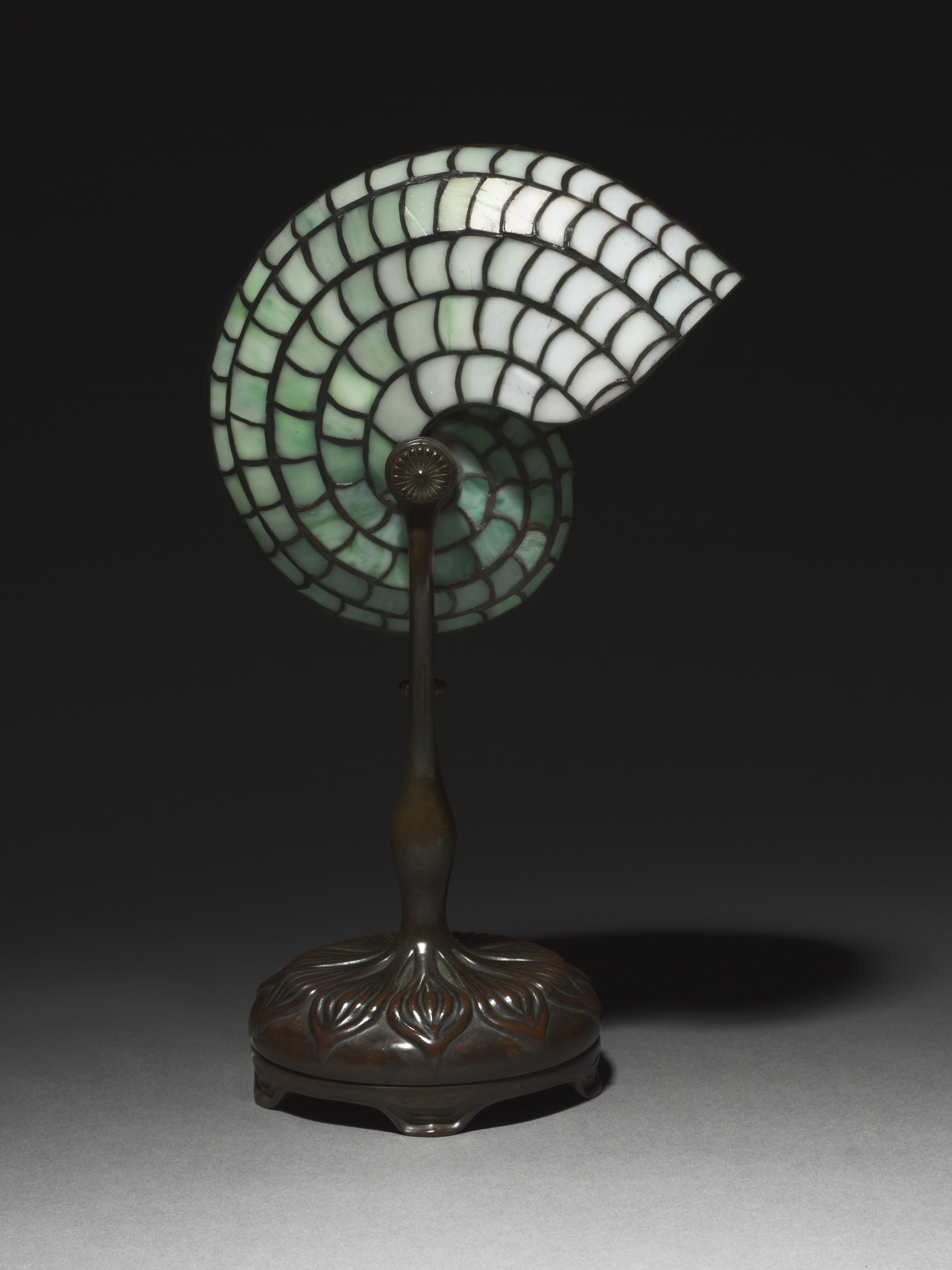
Desk lamp circa 1900

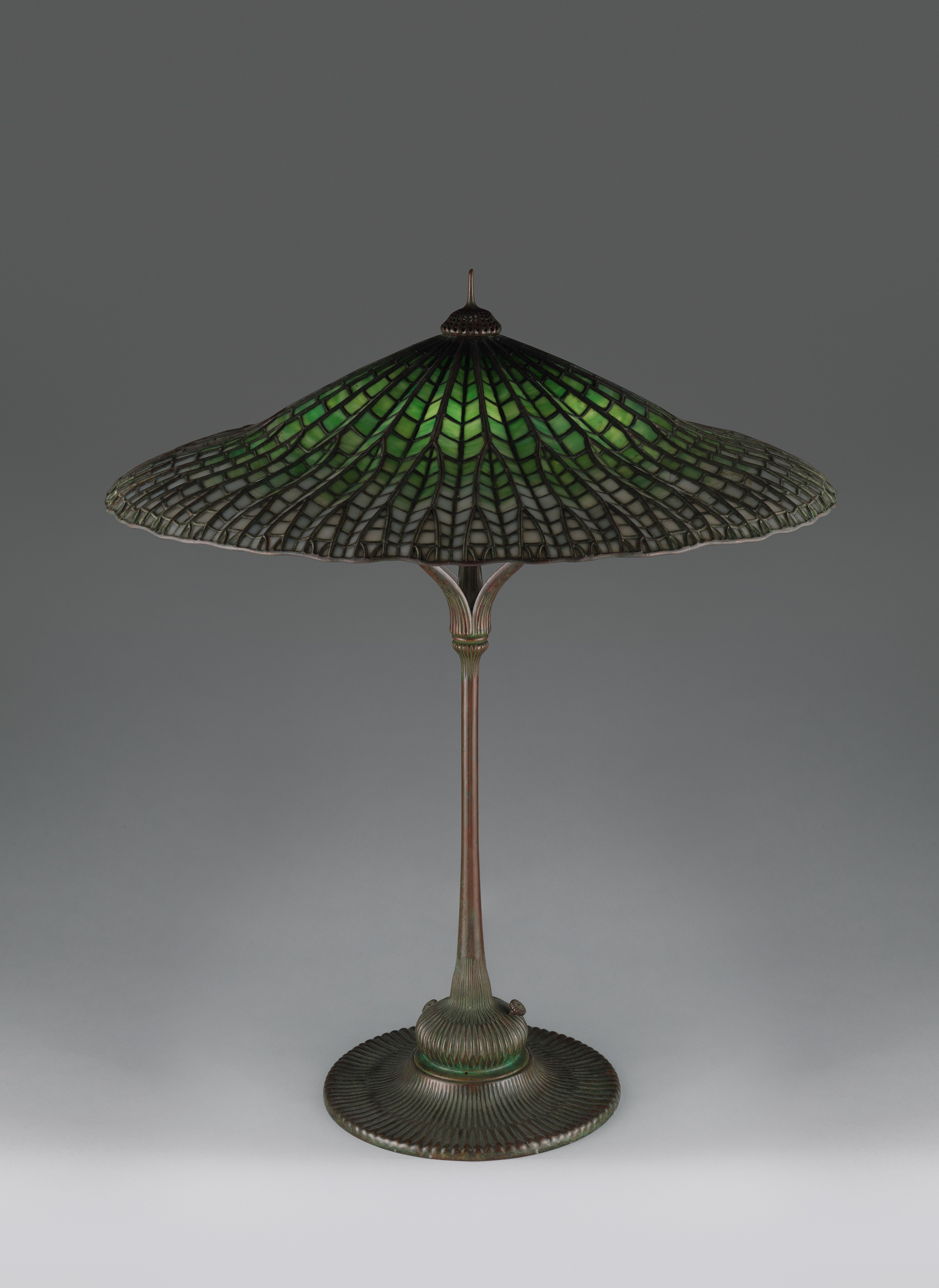
Lotus pagoda table lamp circa 1900–15

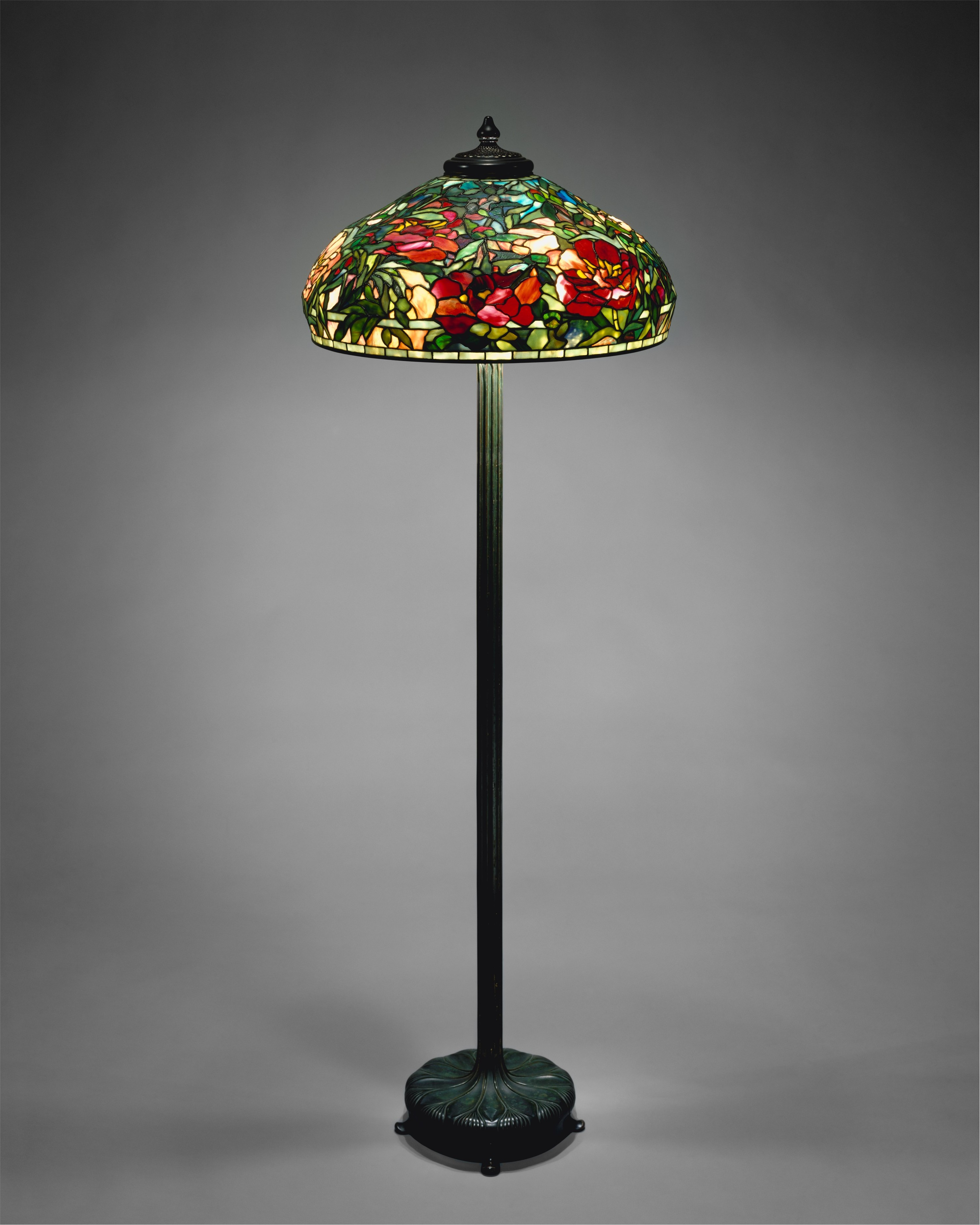
Peony floor lamp circa 1904–15

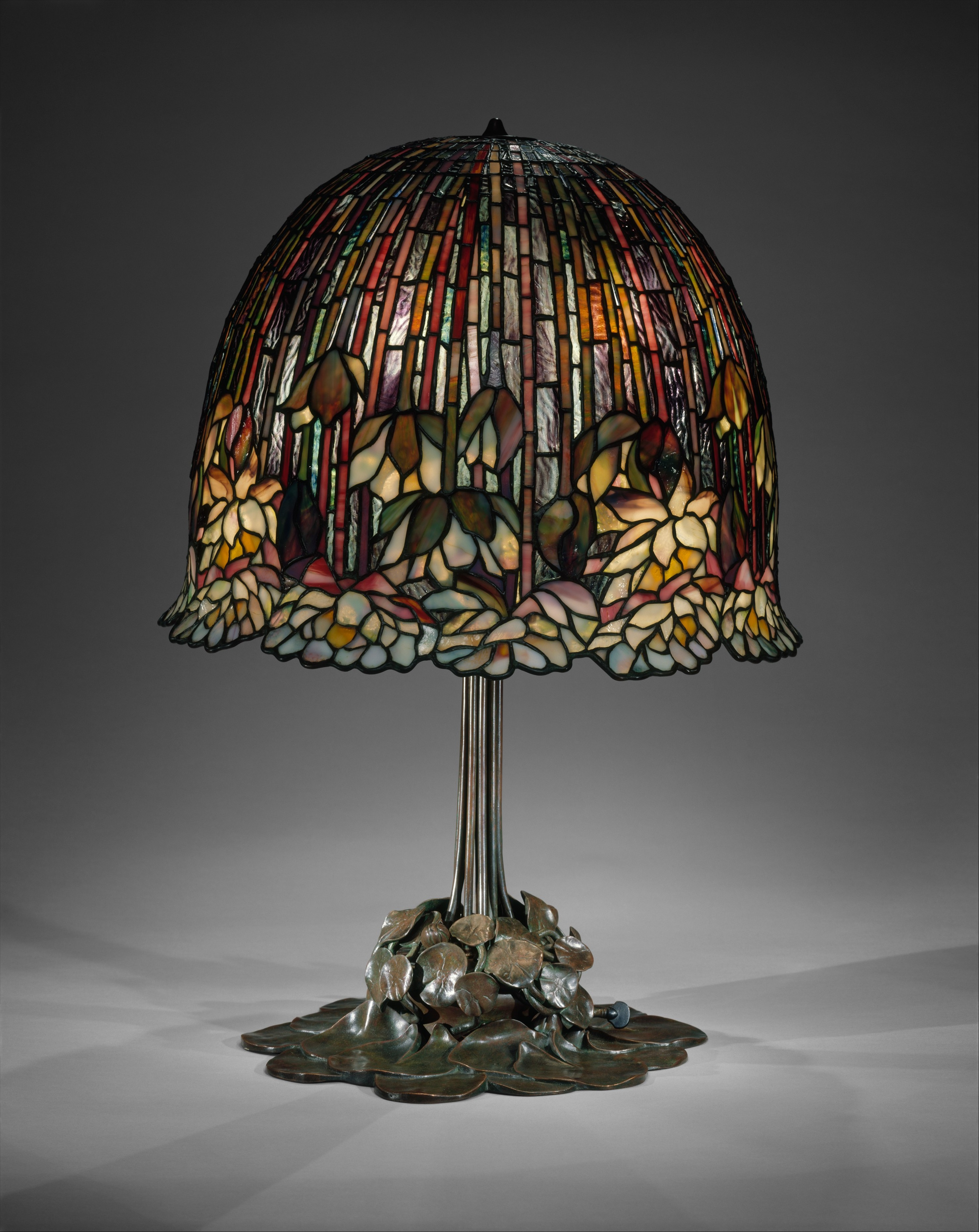
Water lily table lamp circa 1904–15

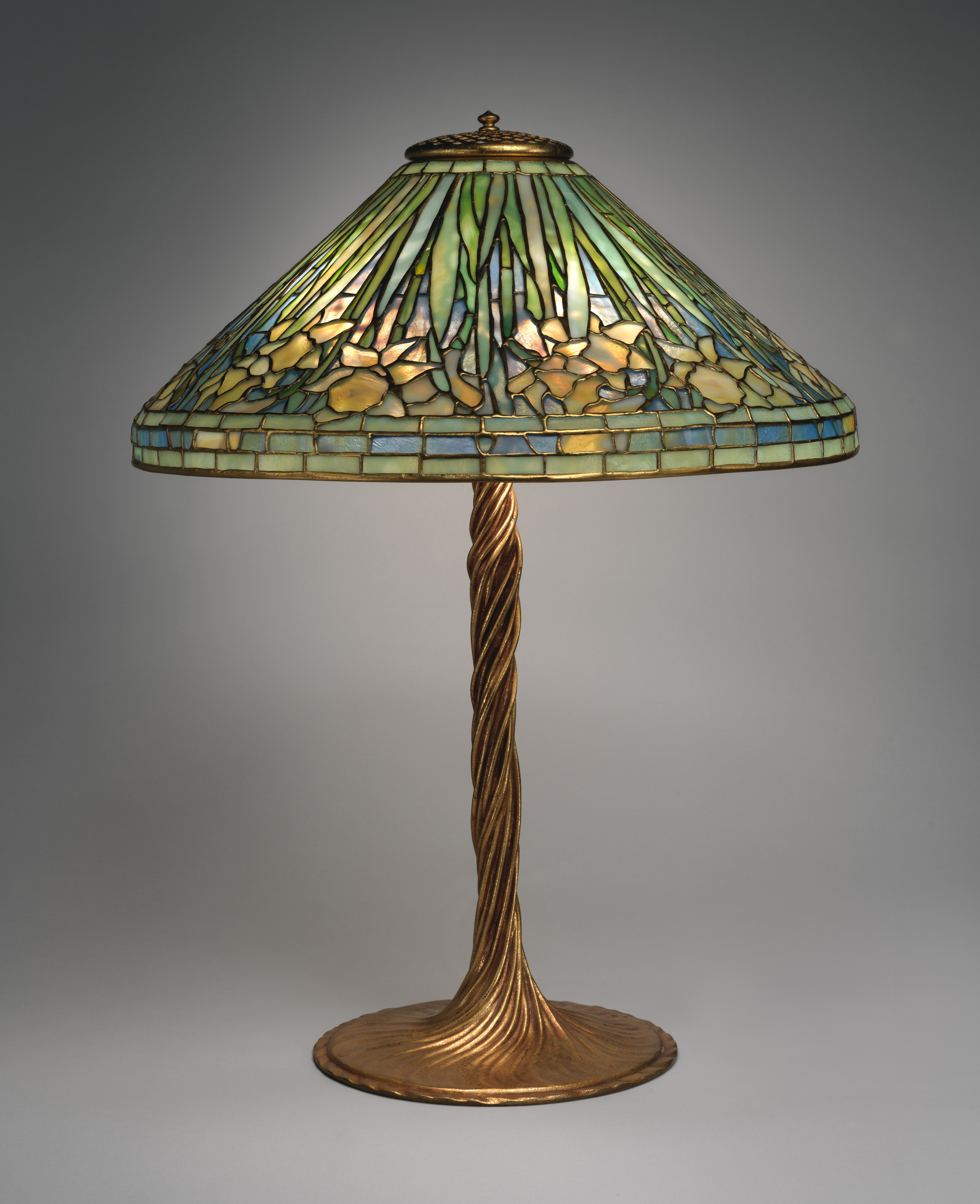
Daffodil table lamp circa 1904–24

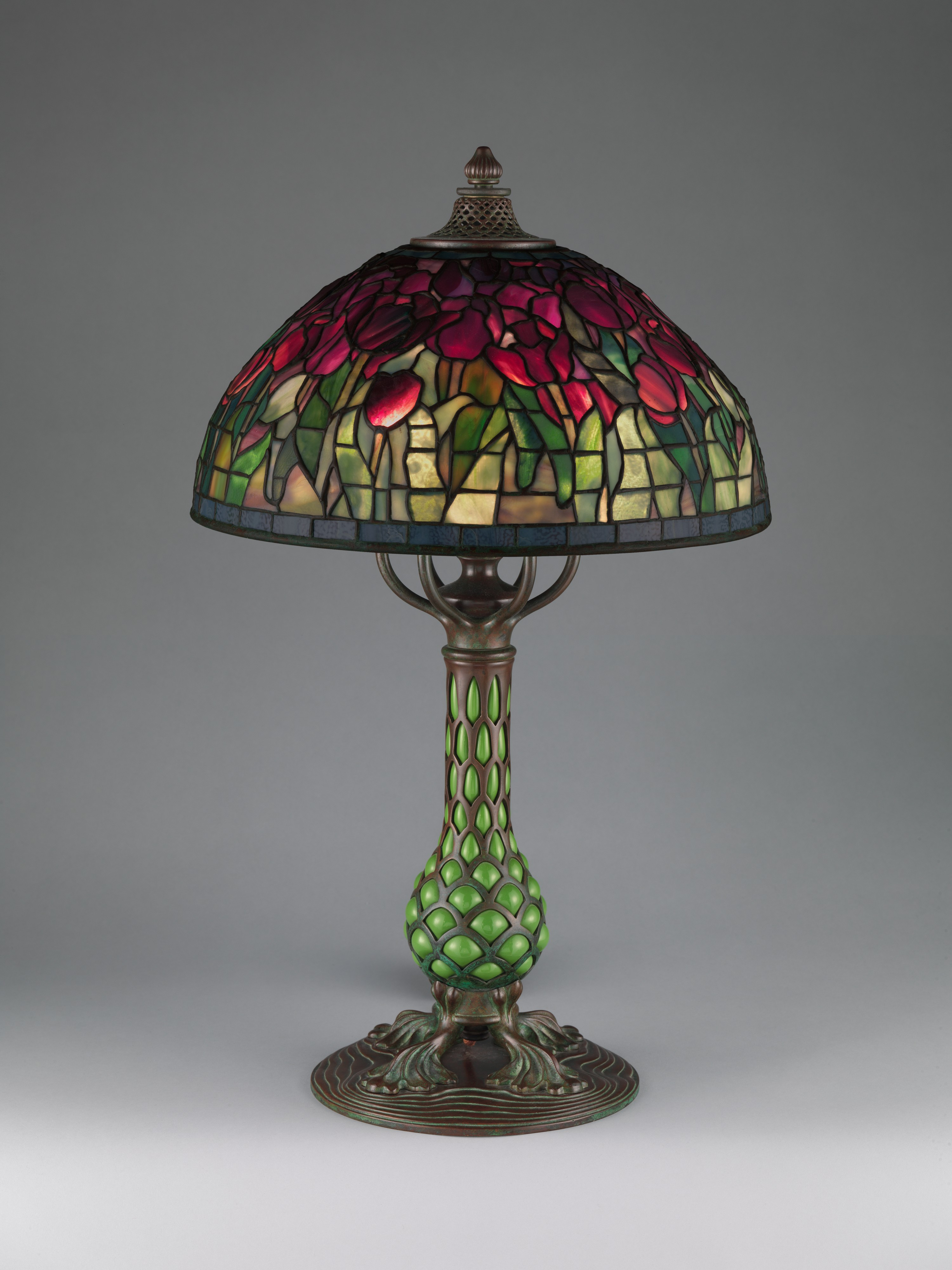
Tulip table lamp circa 1907–12

== Tiffany-style lamps ==
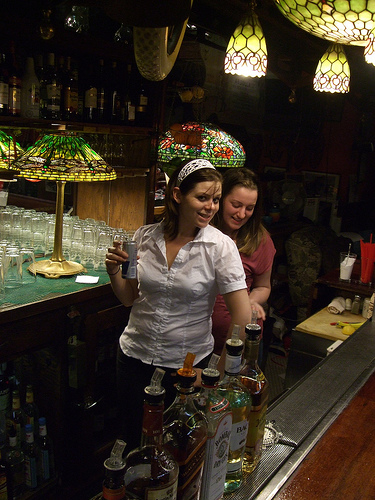
Bartenders at Eddie Rickenbackers fern bar in San Francisco in 2008, with real Tiffany lamps behind the bar

In the 1970s and 1980s, fern bars featured replica Tiffany lamps and other decor inspired by the Gilded Age as part of an upscale atmosphere. Also in the 1980s, the casual restaurant chains TGI Fridays and Ruby Tuesday had kitschy decor with many antiques and Tiffany-style lamps. The restaurant aesthetics were meant to be nostalgic and comfortable, like a grandmother's house. The 1999 comedy film Office Space featured a restaurant that parodied these restaurants, including its own Tiffany-style lamps. For decades, Pizza Hut restaurants had custom Tiffany-style pendant lamp shades with Pizza Hut branding. However, in the 2000s and 2010s many casual restaurants pared down their interior design for a more modern look, including removing Tiffany-style lamps.

In the 2020s, replica Tiffany lamps are seen by some as a fashionable part of home decor, aligning with nostalgic grandmillennial style. The television series The Gilded Age has helped inspire interest in decor from this era. A few tattoo artists specialize in tattoos inspired by Tiffany lamps.

Producers of Tiffany-inspired lamps include Meyda Lighting in Yorkville, New York, and Dale Tiffany.

== See also ==
- Roman Bronze Works
- General Bronze Corporation
