= Martin Eidelberg =

American art historian

- Born: Martin P. Eidelberg; January 30, 1941 (age 85); New York City, New York, United States
- Education: Columbia University; Princeton University
- Occupations: Art historian Curator
- Employer: Rutgers University
- Known for: Scholarship on Tiffany glass, American ceramic art, and French art, particularly Jean-Antoine Watteau

Martin P. Eidelberg (born January 30, 1941) is an American professor emeritus of art history at Rutgers University and an expert on ceramics and Tiffany glass. He is noted for discovering that many floral Tiffany lamp designs were not personally made by Louis Comfort Tiffany, but by an underpaid and unrecognized woman designer named Clara Driscoll.

== Career ==
A native of New York, Eidelberg attended Columbia University, where he graduated cum laude in 1961. He then attended Princeton University, where he studied art history. He received his Ph.D. in 1965 with a thesis titled "Watteau’s Drawings, Their Use and Significance".

He taught at Rutgers University from 1964 until his retirement in 2002.

Eidelberg found a series of letters that Clara Driscoll had written to her mother and sisters, which led to new research about the famous Tiffany lamps. Eidelberg was quoted in 2007 in The New York Times as saying "I think Tiffany would have died" if information had leaked out that Driscoll was the real designer of the famous lamps. Eidelberg's discovery led to an exhibition at the New-York Historical Society, which garnered intense media attention. The evidence arrived at the conclusion that Driscoll was the secret creative force behind design of the famous Tiffany lamps. The letters ultimately offered a new inside view of the workings of the studios.

Driscoll had been paid only $35 per week which was "good money" at the turn of the century, but small compared to the value of the lamps today. The Driscoll letters revealed the "inner workings of Tiffany Studios" and exposed more about the practice of gender segregation at the Tiffany firm. Relations between the unionized men and the women were "not always friendly. Women had to leave if they married and company literature refused to acknowledge designers other than Tiffany himself played a role in the artistic glasswork. Eidelberg's detective work led to a well-publicized exhibit called A New Light on Tiffany which revealed "a new understanding of the techniques and procedures used to produce the extraordinary objects that made Tiffany such an exalted name in American design."

In 1987, Eidelberg wrote what one reviewer called a "handsome, graphically arresting catalogue" entitled From Our Native Clay which traces the history of the art-pottery movement.

In 1989, he curated a show on George E. Ohr, a "wizard at the potter's wheel who made witty, frequently erotic paper-thin vessels in Biloxi, Miss."

He studied Antoine Watteau and eighteenth-century French painting. He has also written about artisans such as William H. Grueby, Artus van Briggle, Adelaide Alsop Robineau, S. Bing, and Edward Colonna. Eidelberg is a Professor Emeritus of Art History at Rutgers University.

In 2010, he co-curated the exhibition "Die Jugend der Moderne-Jugendstil und Art Nouveau aus Muenchner Privatbesitz" in the Museum Villa Stuck in Munich, Germany.

== Works ==
- The Arts and Crafts Movement in America, 1876-1916
- Masterworks of Louis Comfort Tiffany (1989)
- Behind the Scenes of Tiffany Glassmaking (2001)
- The Lamps of Louis C. Tiffany (2005)
- A New light on Tiffany, Clara Driscoll and the Tiffany Girls (2007)
- Tiffany Favrile Glass and the Quest of Beauty (2007)
