= Clara Driscoll (glass designer) =

American glass artist (1861–1944)

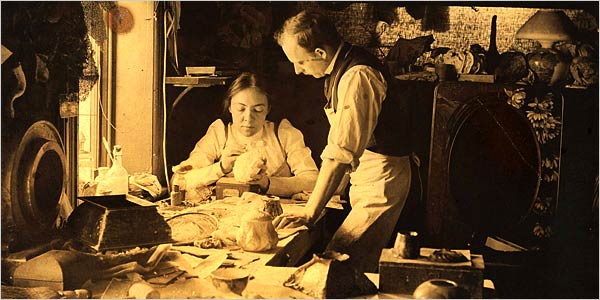
Clara Driscoll in a workroom with Joseph Briggs, a longtime manager at Tiffany Studios (1901)

Clara Driscoll (December 15, 1861 – November 6, 1944) of Tallmadge, Ohio, was head of the Tiffany Studios Women's Glass Cutting Department (the "Tiffany Girls"), in New York City. Using patterns created from the original designs, these women selected and cut the glass to be used in the famous lamps. Driscoll designed more than thirty Tiffany lamps produced by Tiffany Studios, among them the Wisteria, Dragonfly, Peony, and from all accounts her first — the Daffodil.

== Biography ==
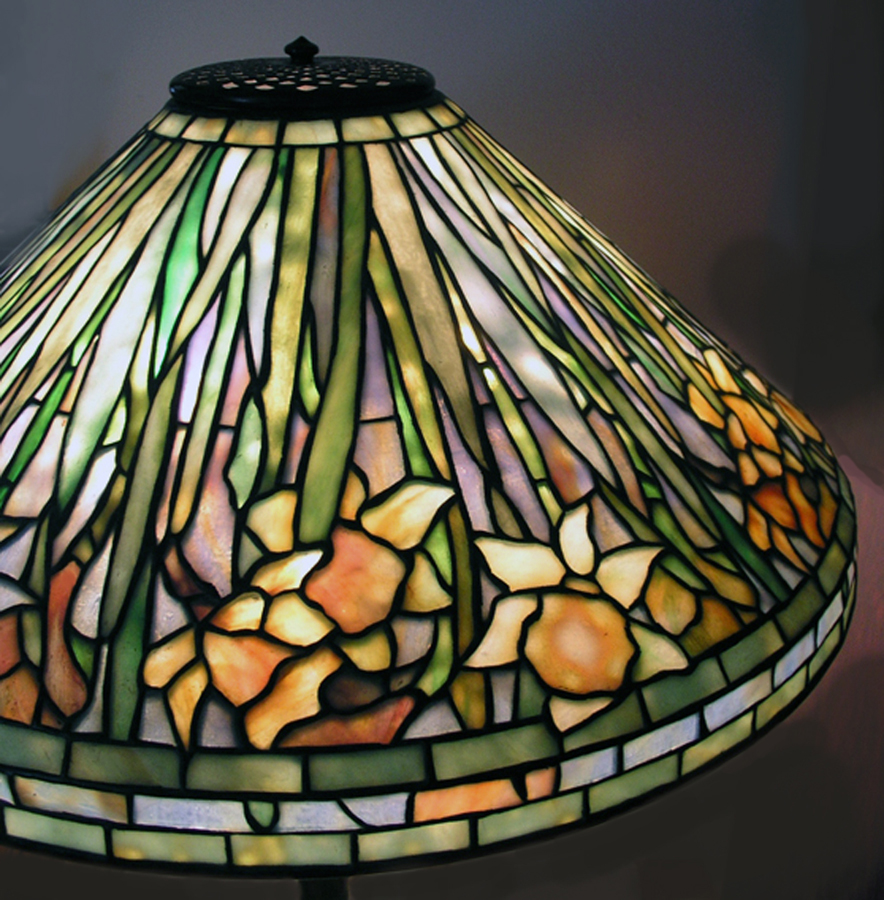
A Tiffany Studios daffodil leaded glass table lamp (shade shown), designed by Driscoll

Clara Driscoll was born Clara Pierce Wolcott on December 15, 1861, the eldest daughter of Elizur V. Wolcott and Fannie Pierce. She lost her father at the age of 12. Unusual for that time, she, along with her equally bright and motivated three younger sisters, was encouraged to pursue a higher education. Clara showed a flair for art, and after attending the Western Reserve School of Design for Women (now the Cleveland Institute of Art) and working for a local furniture maker, she moved to New York and enrolled at the then new Metropolitan Museum Art School.

Driscoll's artistic potential was apparent and she was hired by Louis Comfort Tiffany to work at Tiffany Glass Company (later known as Tiffany Studios) in 1888. She worked there off and on for more than 20 years, designing lamps and fancy goods as well as supervising the Women's Glass Cutting Department. Engaged or married women were not allowed to work at the company, so Driscoll had to leave because of her marriage in 1889. After Driscoll's first husband Francis Driscoll died in 1892, she resumed working for Tiffany. She became engaged again in 1896-1897, to Edwin Waldo, but he disappeared and no marriage occurred. She remained at Tiffany Studios until her marriage to Edward A. Booth in 1909.

While employed with Tiffany, Driscoll worked closely with a number of other "Tiffany Girls" including Alice Carmen Gouvy and Lillian Palmié.

== Letters and works ==
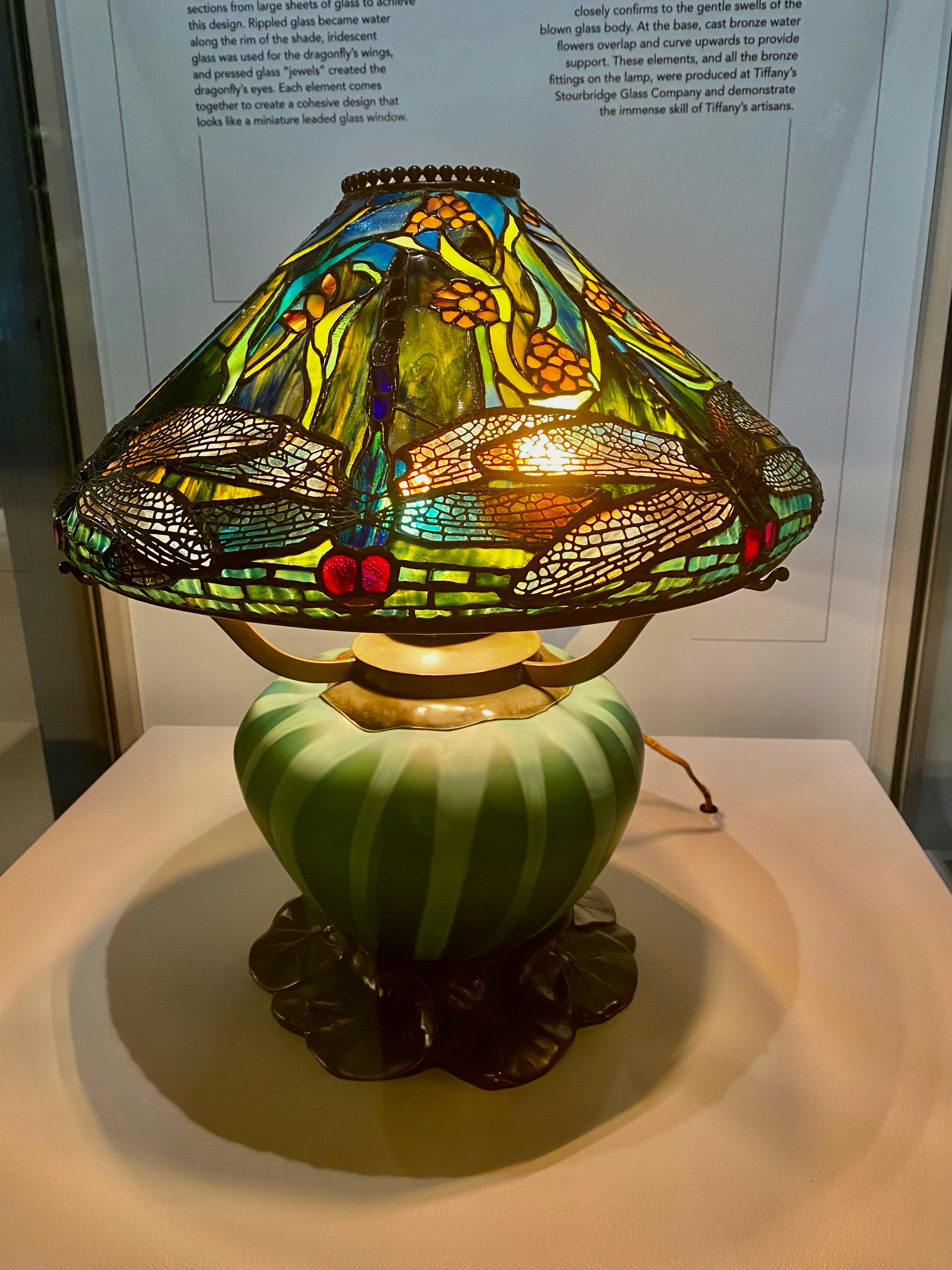
Dragonfly table lamp c. 1899, designed by Driscoll

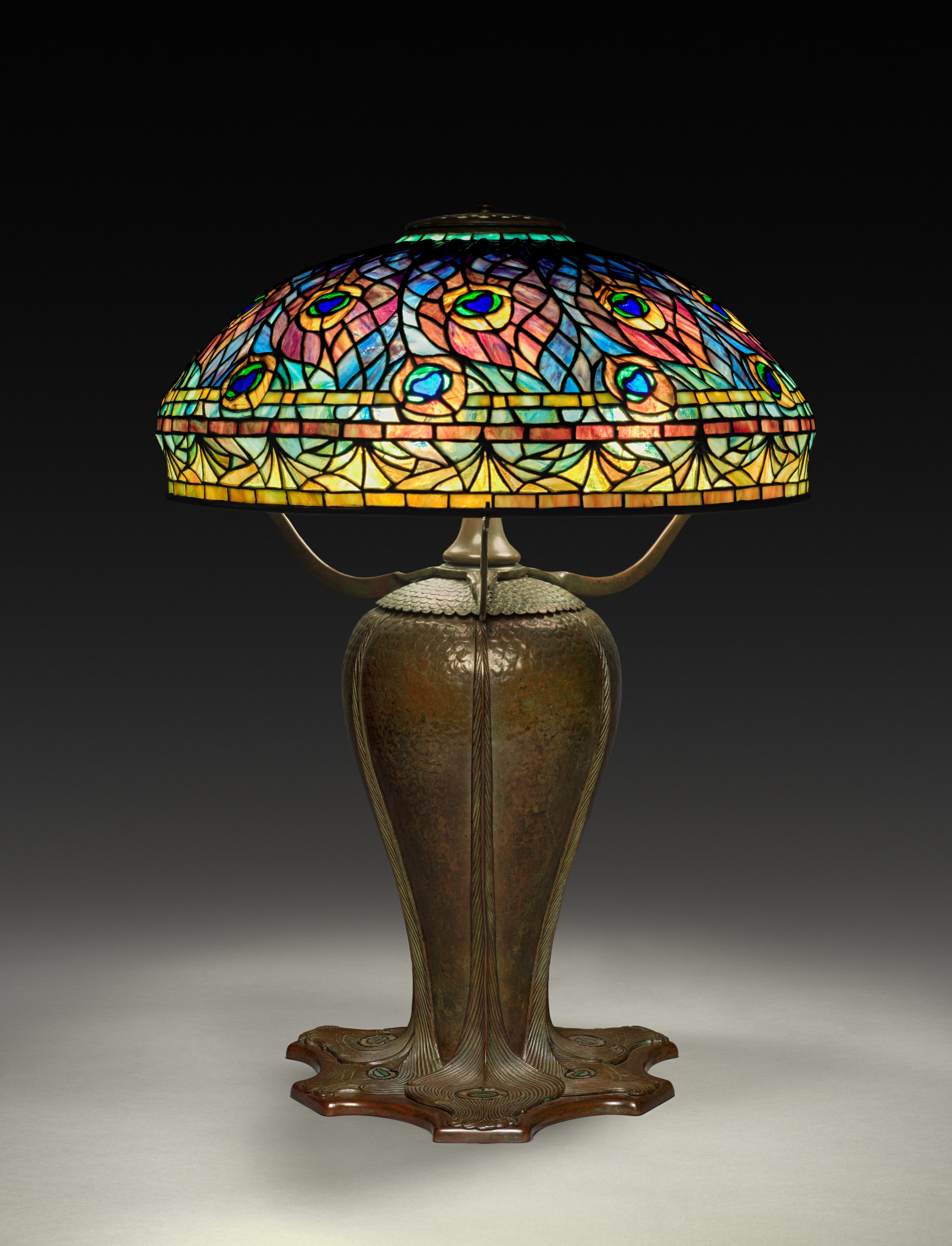
Peacock table lamp, circa 1902, likely designed by Driscoll

Through the combined efforts of Martin Eidelberg (professor emeritus of art history at Rutgers University), Nina Gray (another independent scholar and former curator at the New-York Historical Society), and Margaret K. Hofer (curator of decorative arts, New-York Historical Society), the involvement of Clara Driscoll and other "Tiffany Girls" in designing Tiffany lamps was widely publicized. However, a book published in 2002 entitled Tiffany Desk Treasures, by George A. Kemeny and Donald Miller, had already named Clara Driscoll as the designer of Tiffany's signature Dragonfly lampshade, as well as a significant contributor to Tiffany Glass—four years before Eidelberg and Gray went public with their discovery in 2006. The book also cited Driscoll as being one of the highest-paid women of her time, earning $10,000 per year.

While doing research for a book on Tiffany at the Queens Historical Society, Gray found the historically valuable letters written by Driscoll to her mother and sisters during the time she was employed at Tiffany. The New York Times quoted Gray as saying: "They brought out two books and several boxes, all letters, and I think the first thing I read was about how she had designed a daffodil lamp. And I started squealing. At the top it said something like 'Noon at Tiffany's,' so it was during her lunch hour. What do you do with something like that?" Martin Eidelberg had independently seen the correspondence when he was approached by a descendant of Clara Driscoll after a lecture. The two historians compared notes after they crossed paths at Kent State University, where they were both tracking down more of Driscoll's correspondence. Their conclusion was beyond doubt. It was Clara Driscoll and the "Tiffany Girls" who had created many of the Tiffany lamps originally attributed to Louis Comfort Tiffany and his staff of male designers.

The New-York Historical Society's exhibit "A New Light on Tiffany: Clara Driscoll and the Tiffany Girls" (November 27, 2006) showcasing the work of Driscoll (and her "girls") was the result of the investigative efforts of Eidelberg, Gray and Hofer. The New York Times on February 25, 2007, reported: "As the exhibition was being installed, some of these little metal silhouettes used to make a gorgeous daffodil lamp shade were still jumbled in a box on a storage table. Meaningless on their own, when put in order they bring to life an exquisite object, just as the show itself, a puzzle now assembled, illuminates the talented women who had long stood in the shadow of a celebrated man." Eidelberg, Gray and Hofer's exhibition catalog, A New Light on Tiffany: Clara Driscoll and the Tiffany Girls, was published in 2007.

Driscoll was a title character of Susan Vreeland's 2011 novel, Clara and Mr. Tiffany.

== See also ==
- Alice Carmen Gouvy
- Tiffany glass
- Tiffany lamp
