= Alice Carmen Gouvy =

American designer (d. 1924)

- Born: c.1870-75 Cleveland, Ohio
- Died: 27 March 1924
- Education: Cleveland School of Art, Art Students League
- Known for: Glass, Enamel, Watercolor
- Movement: Arts and Crafts, Art Nouveau

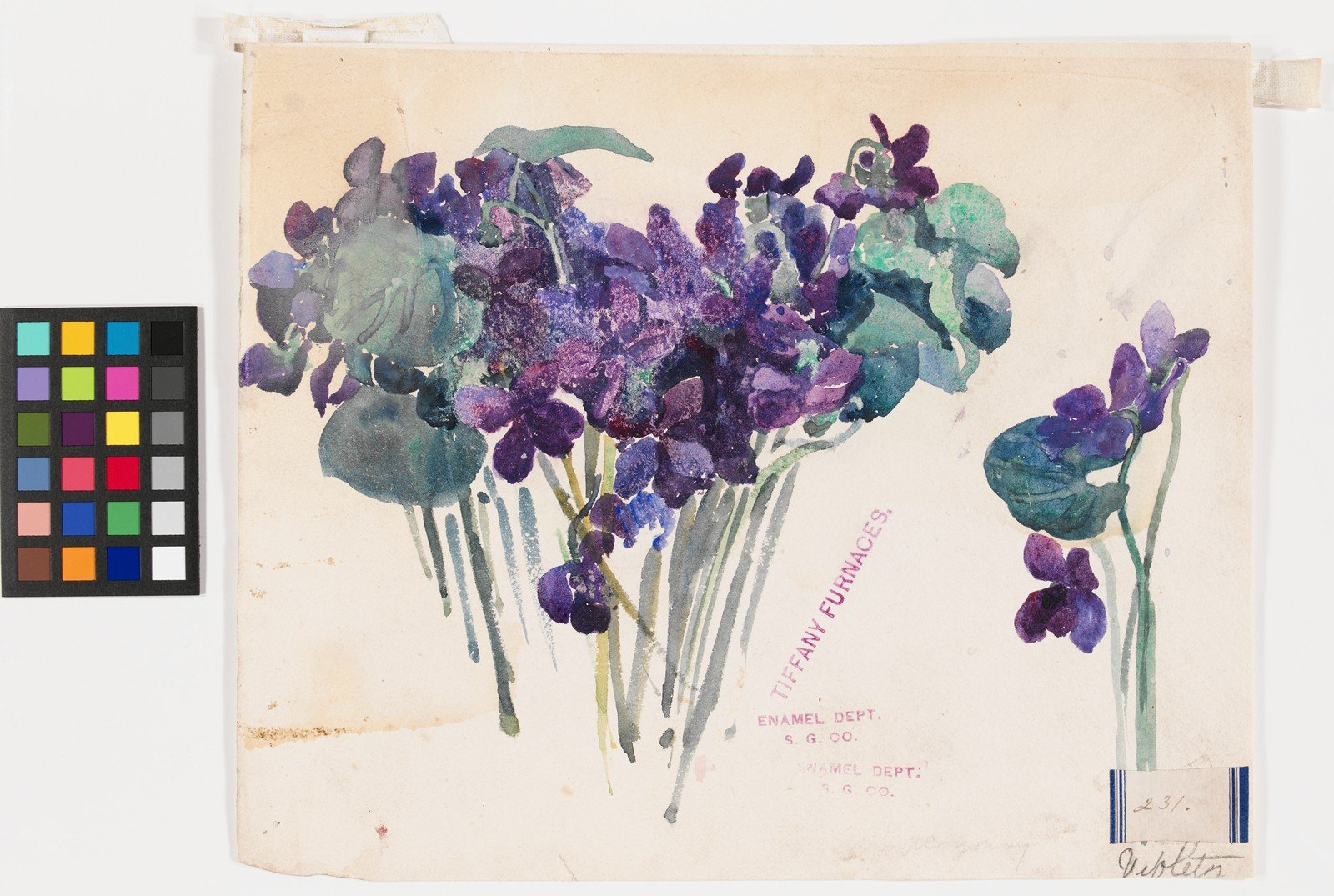
Violets Alice Carmen Gouvy for Tiffany Studios, 1898-1902

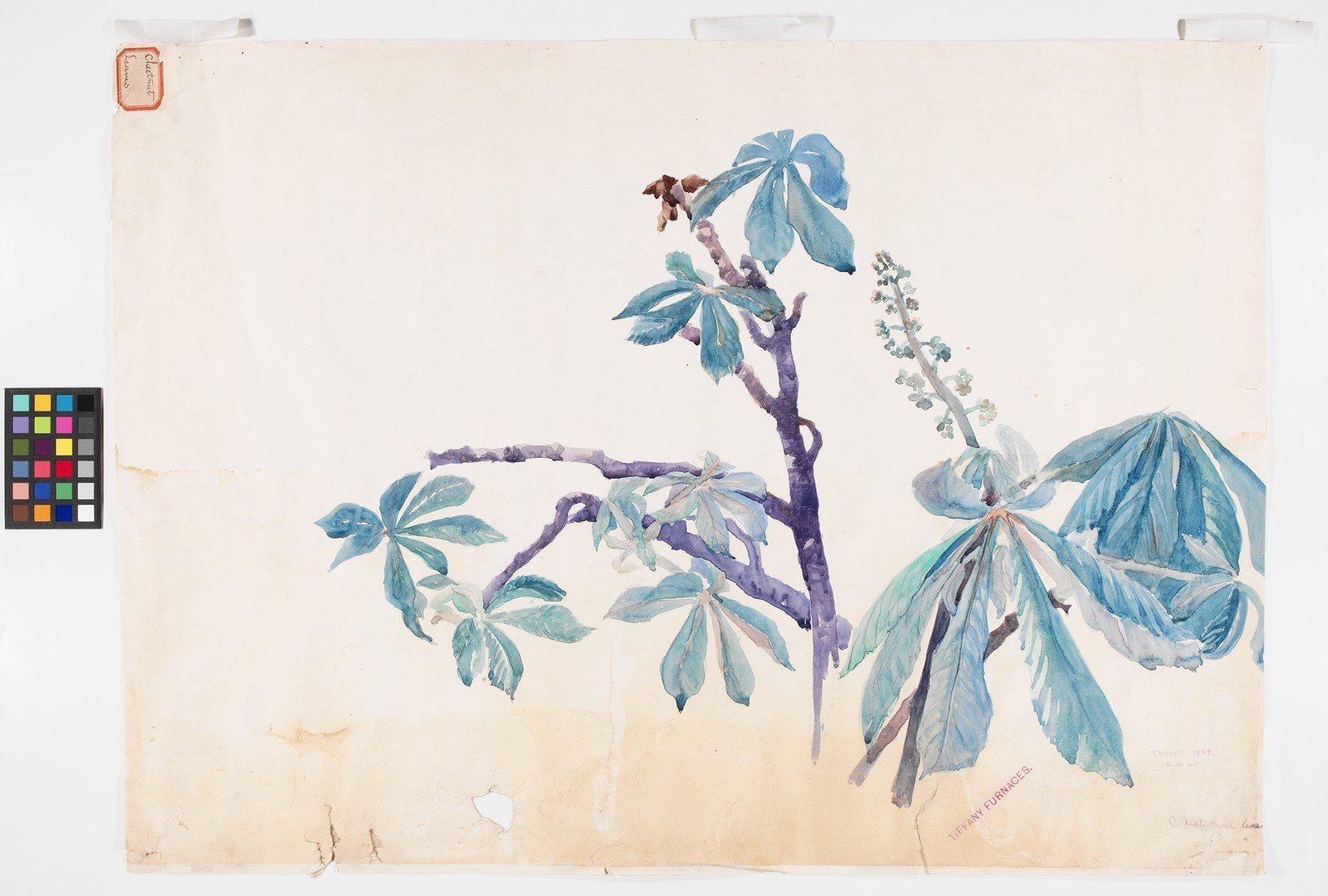
Chestnut leaves by Alice Carmen Gouvy for Tiffany Studios, 1898-1902

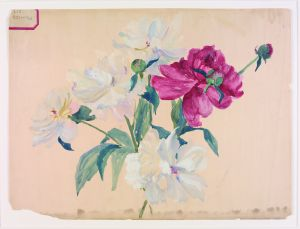
Peonies 177 by Alice Carmen Gouvy for Tiffany Studios, 1902

Alice Carmen Gouvy (c.1870-75 - March 27, 1924) was a designer at Tiffany Studios and worked closely with Clara Driscoll, the head of the Women's Glass Cutting Department.

== Early life and education ==
Born in Cleveland, Alice Carmen Gouvy was the daughter of Charles P. And Helen L. Gouvy. She graduated from the Cleveland School of Art in 1894. After moving to New York, she shared an apartment with Tiffany Studios designer Clara Driscoll. She studied at the Art Students League from 1896 to 1898. In 1898, she began working at Tiffany studios. She became Driscoll's most trusted assistant, and remained a close friend. The two shared a summer cottage at Point Pleasant, New Jersey.

== Career ==
Gouvy began working at Tiffany Studios in the fall of 1898. That year, Louis C. Tiffany undertook his first experiments with enameling on metals at the Stourbridge Glass Co. facility. Tiffany hired additional staff to create chemicals for the new department. Gouvy was hired to work on formulas and new designs. The department was originally set up in a small laboratory in Tiffany's mansion at 72nd Street and Madison Avenue, and moved to the glass shop at Corona in 1903. By 1900, Gouvy also worked in the Tiffany Studios pottery department and designed bronze objects. In early 1907, Gouvy left Tiffany Studios and returned to Cleveland to work as a schoolteacher while caring for her mother.

== Work ==
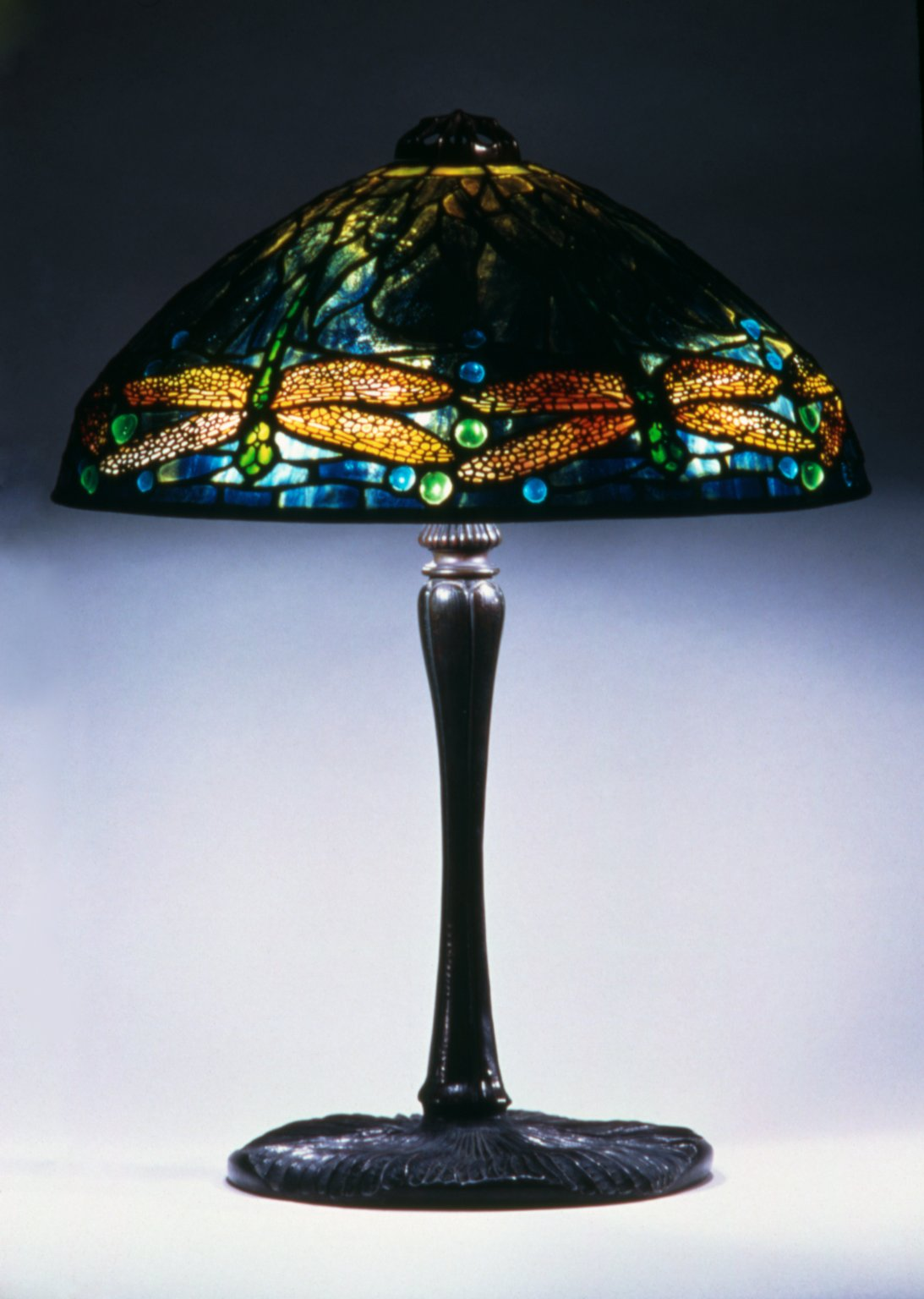
Dragonfly Lamp, Tiffany Studios

The works of Tiffany's artists were rarely identified by name. Gouvy is known to have helped Clara Driscoll and Agnes Northrop to design some of Tiffany's iconic pieces, including the Flying Fish shade, the Deep Sea base, and the Dragonfly lamp. Her sketches are also known to have inspired Tiffany blown glass vases with petal shapes and motifs reminiscent of peonies and marigolds. Many of her works, including Dandelion Plant 95, are inspired by nature.

=== Major exhibitions ===
Eight watercolor sketches from Tiffany Furnaces around 1902, painstakingly restored, revealed the signatures of Alice Gouvy and Lillian Palmié. They became the basis for an exhibit at the Rakow Research Library of the Corning Museum of Glass, Tiffany Treasures: Design Drawings by Alice Gouvy and Lillian Palmié, held November 1, 2009 to April 30, 2010. Gouvy's drawings have been described as "lively plant portraits that could be translated to a three-dimensional medium."

Works by Gouvy were also included in the New York Historical Society's traveling exhibition A New Light on Tiffany: Clara Driscoll and the Tiffany Girls which appeared in Munich, Germany and Albuquerque, New Mexico in 2010–2011.

=== Public collections ===
Her works are included in collections such as the Corning Museum of Glass, the Charles Hosmer Morse Museum of American Art and the Chrysler Museum of Art. Ephemera relating to her work is held in the Art and Artist Files collection at the Smithsonian Libraries.

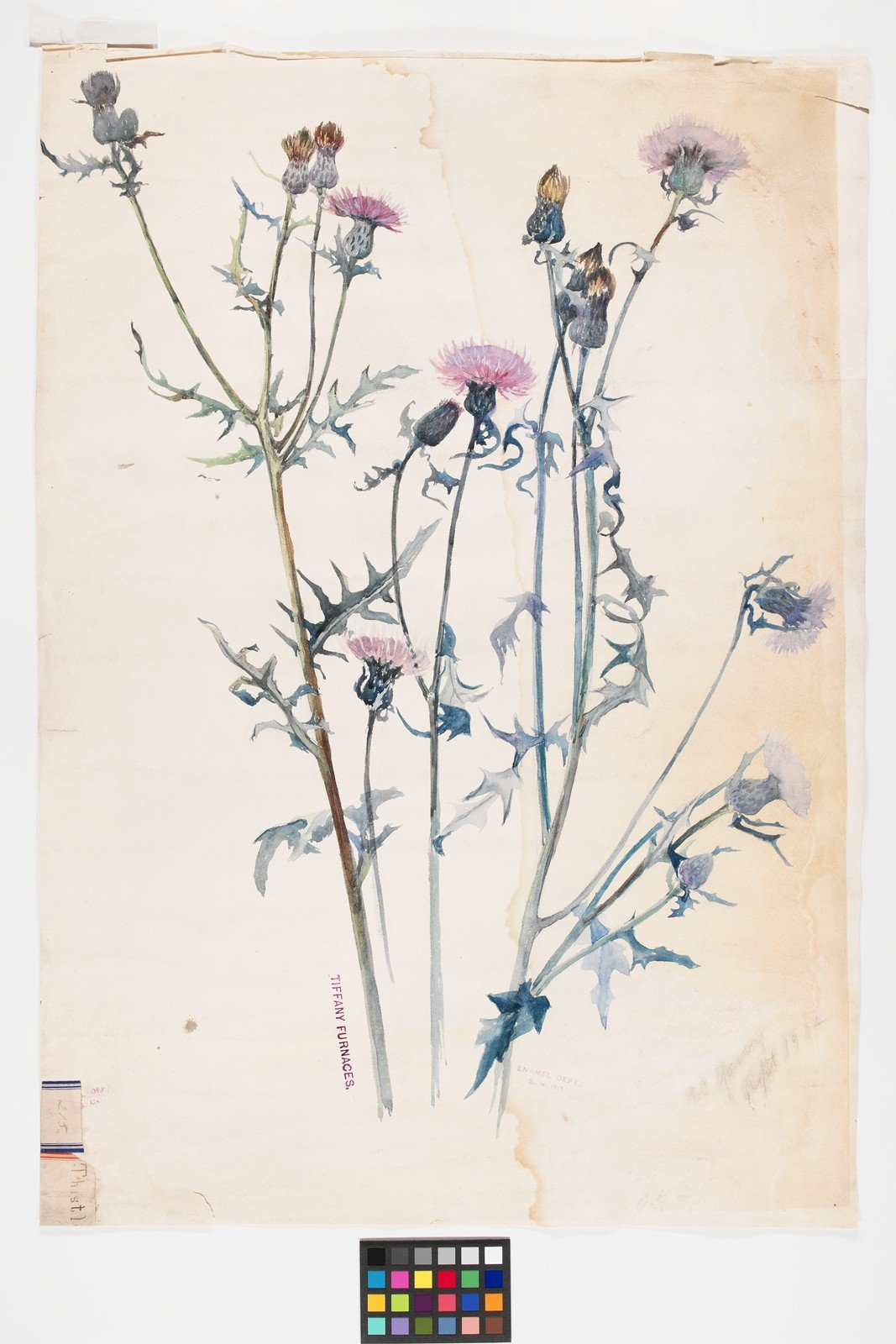
Thistle, Alice Carmen Gouvy for Tiffany Studios, 1902

== See also ==
- Clara Driscoll
- Tiffany glass
