= Handel Company =

American lamp maker (1885–1936)

- Founded: 1885
- Defunct: 1936
- Headquarters: Meriden, Connecticut, United States
- Area served: Predominantly the United States
- Key people: P.J. Handel
- Products: lamps, glass objects

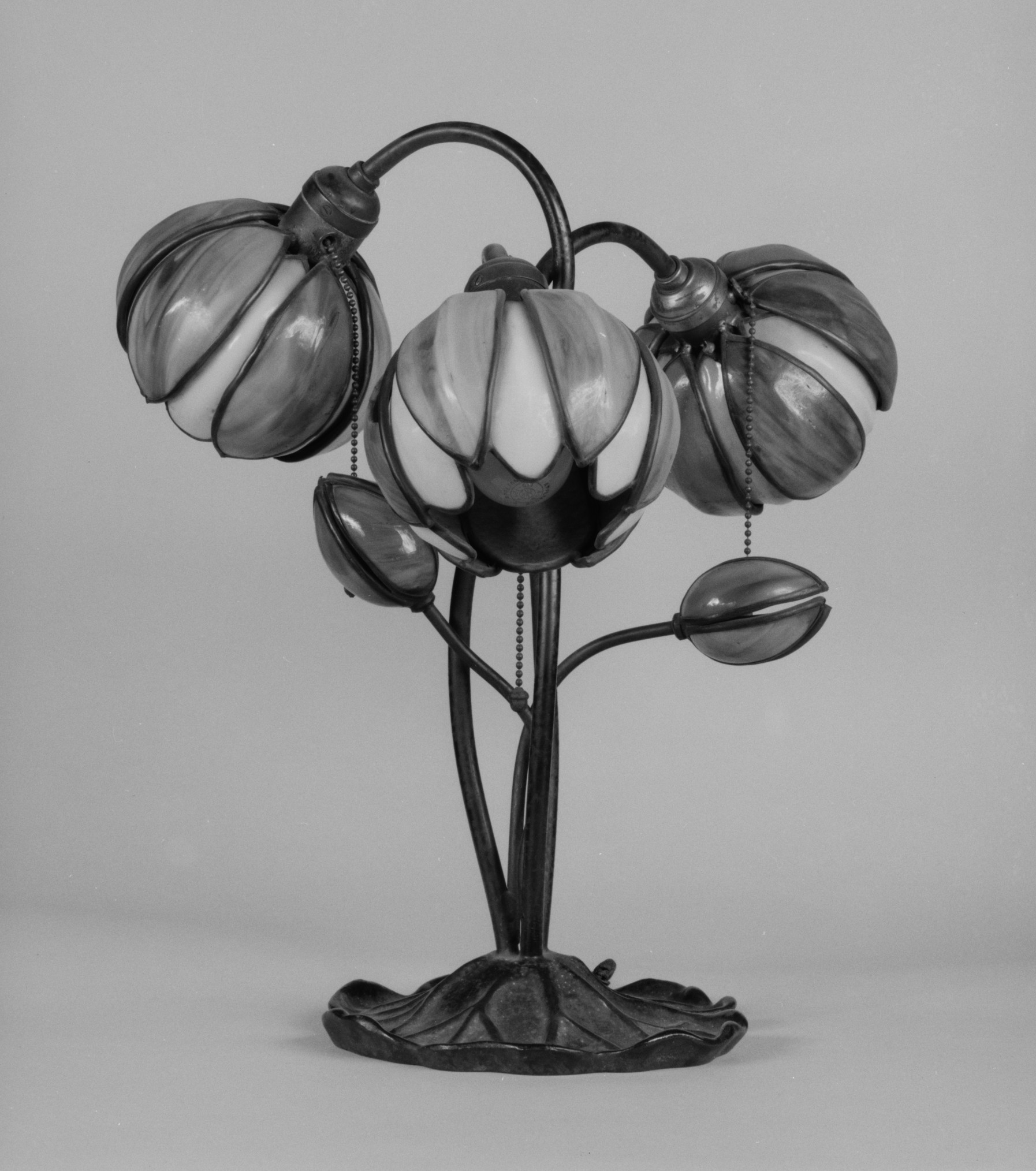
Handel Company lamp design (1900–1930) at the Metropolitan Museum of Art

The Handel Company, or P. J. Handel Company, was a manufacturer of lamps and decorated glassware in Meriden, Connecticut. Adolph Eydam and Philip Handel formed the Eydam and Handel Company in 1885 and employed local artists in their factory. Handel bought out Eydam in 1892 or 1893. The company closed in 1936.

== History ==
The Handel Company was incorporated in 1903. As of about 1911, P. J. Handel was president and treasurer of the business. In Meriden Illustrated (1911): "[The company has] obtained [a] national reputation for the artistic and the high quality of their product. A number of patents are controlled which makes their business a very successful one. There is a force of 125 people skilled in the various branches and steadily engaged."

The Handel Company maintained a showroom in New York City at the corner of West Broadway and Murray St. with dedicated sales agents for the entire United States. The production location was in Meriden on East Main Street, just east of Broad Street. In 1914, Philip J. Handel died, after which his wife Fannie took over operations.

Some of Handel's work was similar to Tiffany lamps, which were popular at the time.

== Books and collections ==
Over the years, the following books have focused on the designs of Handel lamps: Joanne Grant's The painted lamps of Handel (c. 1978); De Falco, Hibel & Hibel's Handel lamps: Painted shades and glassware (1986); Carole Hibel's The Handel lamps book (1999); and Robert DeFalco's Metal overlays by Handel (c. 2000). Handel Company lamps were also included in Martin May's Great art glass lamps: Tiffany, Duffner & Kimberly, Pairpoint, and Handel.

As of 2016, lamp designs by the Handel Company are in the following museum collections: Brooklyn Museum; Corning Museum of Glass; Museum of American Glass in Millville, NJ; Tucson Museum of Art; and the Virginia Museum of Fine Arts. Over the years, Handel lamps have been exhibited in the 1889 Delavan Opera House exposition in Meriden and the 1915 Industrial art exhibition at the National Museum (Smithsonian) in Washington, DC. Handel lamps have been shown and assessed on the Antiques Roadshow TV program.

In 2008, a Handel Company "fine and rare elk lamp" (c. 1917) was sold at Sotheby's in New York for US$85,000 in its "20th century design" sale.
